= 103.1 FM =

FM radio frequency

The following radio stations broadcast on FM frequency 103.1 MHz:

== Argentina ==
- Ambrosetti in Ambrosetti, Santa Fe
- Atlántica in Monte Hermoso, Buenos Aires
- Ciudad in Marcos Juárez, Córdoba
- Uno in Buenos Aires
- 221 radio in La Plata, Buenos Aires
- Litoral in Paraná, Entre Ríos
- LRH354 Norte in Castelli, Chaco
- LRV384 Sol in Armstrong, Santa Fe
- Radiocanal in Córdoba
- Radio 2 in Mendoza
- Radio María in General San Martín, Chaco
- Radio María in Serrezuela, Córdoba
- Vivencias in Sancti Spiritu, Santa Fe
- Radio Popular Che Guevara in Rosario, Santa Fe

== Australia ==
- 5EBI in Adelaide, South Australia
- ABC Classic in Tamworth, New South Wales
- 4TSV in Townsville, Queensland
- Radio National in Rockhampton, Queensland
- Rhema FM in Grafton, New South Wales
- 3BBA in Ballarat, Victoria

== Canada (Channel 276) ==
- CBEF-1-FM in Leamington, Ontario
- CBFZ-FM in Temiscaming, Quebec
- CBH-FM-2 in Mulgrave, Nova Scotia
- CBMH-FM in Schefferville, Quebec
- CBSI-FM-20 in Riviere-St-Paul, Quebec
- CBUF-FM-10 in Whistler, British Columbia
- CFHK-FM in St. Thomas, Ontario
- CFMF-FM in Fermont, Quebec
- CFMX-FM in Cobourg, Ontario
- CFSW-FM in Chaplin, Saskatchewan
- CFXL-FM in Calgary, Alberta
- CFYX-FM-3 in Riviere-du-Loup, Quebec
- CHAW-FM in Little Current, Ontario
- CHHO-FM in Louiseville, Quebec
- CHTT-FM in Victoria, British Columbia
- CIAU-FM in Radisson, Quebec
- CJBB-FM in Englehart, Ontario
- CJFW-FM in Terrace, British Columbia
- CJKC-FM in Kamloops, British Columbia
- CJMC-FM-3 in Les Mechins, Quebec
- CJMC-FM-6 in Cloridorme, Quebec
- CJMC-FM-8 in Murdochville, Quebec
- CJMO-FM in Moncton, New Brunswick
- CKBS-FM in Nakusp, British Columbia
- CKMM-FM in Winnipeg, Manitoba
- CKOD-FM in Valleyfield, Quebec
- CKQQ-FM in Kelowna, British Columbia
- VF2152 in McBride, British Columbia
- VF2240 in Uranium City, Saskatchewan
- VF2426 in Wynyard, Saskatchewan

== China ==
- CNR The Voice of China in Wenzhou
- Chaozhou Drama Radio in Chaozhou

== Indonesia ==
- Gen FM in Surabaya, East Java
- OZ Radio in Bandung

== Mexico ==
- XHACS-FM in Playa del Carmen, Quintana Roo
- XHAGS-FM in Acapulco, Guerrero
- XHEPO-FM in San Luis Potosí, San Luis Potosí
- XHFQ-FM in Cananea, Sonora
- XHJTF-FM in La Cruz, Jalisco
- XHKD-FM in Ciudad Acuña, Coahuila
- XHMDR-FM in Ciudad Madero, Tamaulipas
- XHPBPE-FM in Pedro Escobedo, Querétaro
- XHPYM-FM in Mérida, Yucatán
- XHSIBT-FM in San Andrés Tziróndaro, Quiroga Municipality, Michoacán
- XHUAT-FM in Santa María Huatulco, Oaxaca
- XHWQ-FM in Monclova, Coahuila
- XHXF-FM in León, Guanajuato
- XHZMA-FM in Zamora, Michoacán

== Magyarország ==
- Rádió 1 Győr

== Philippines ==
- DZNL in San Fernando City, Pampanga
- DZRR in Baguio City
- DWYO in Puerto Princesa City
- DWCO in Candelaria, Quezon
- DWKM in Naga City
- DYMG in Bacolod City
- DYTG in Tacloban City
- DYSC in Sogod
- DYZT in Ubay, Bohol
- DXIL in Iligan City
- DXFQ in General Santos City
- DXGO in Kidapawan City
- DXKO in Digos City
- DXPA in Nabunturan, Davao del Oro
- DXBW in Mati City
- DXPY in Pagadian City
- DXAM-FM in Butuan City

== Portugal ==
- TSF Rádio Notícias in Caldas da Rainha, Leiria

== United Kingdom ==
- Central FM in the Forth Valley, Scotland
- Downtown Radio in Newry
- Greatest Hits Radio Scottish Borders & North Northumberland in Peebles
- Hits Radio Black Country & Shropshire in Shropshire
- Heart South in West Kent
- 3TFM in Saltcoats, Scotland

== United States (Channel 276) ==
- KAAT in Oakhurst, California
- KACP in Pahrump, Nevada
- KBIE in Auburn, Nebraska
- KCDA in Post Falls, Idaho
- KCDX in Florence, Arizona
- KDAA in Rolla, Missouri
- KDLD in Santa Monica, California
- KDLE in Newport Beach, California
- KDMG in Burlington, Iowa
- KDMM in Parker Strip, Arizona
- KDRP-LP in Dripping Springs, Texas
- KEDJ in Jerome, Idaho
- KEEP in Bandera, Texas
- KEKS in Olpe, Kansas
- KFFA-FM in Helena, Arkansas
- KFIL-FM in Chatfield, Minnesota
- KFWA in Weldona, Colorado
- KGAY-FM in Palm Desert, California
- KHAM in Britt, Iowa
- KHFZ in Pittsburg, Texas
- KHQT in Las Cruces, New Mexico
- KHRD in Weaverville, California
- KIPW-LP in Salinas, California
- KJHF in Kualapuu, Hawaii
- KKCN in Ballinger, Texas
- KKCY in Colusa, California
- KKJK in Ravenna, Nebraska
- KLO-FM in Coalville, Utah
- KLUN in Paso Robles, California
- KMUL in Muleshoe, Texas
- KMXS in Anchorage, Alaska
- KMZM in Madison, South Dakota
- KNNW in Columbia, Louisiana
- KOFM in Enid, Oklahoma
- KPAI-LP in Paisley, Oregon
- KPAS in Fabens, Texas
- KRSB-FM in Roseburg, Oregon
- KRVO in Columbia Falls, Montana
- KRVX in Wimbledon, North Dakota
- KSBZ in Sitka, Alaska
- KSCW-LP in Sun City West, Arizona
- KSHK in Hanamaulu, Hawaii
- KSPN in Aspen, Colorado
- KSRY in Tehachapi, California
- KSSM in Copperas Cove, Texas
- KTJT-LP in Davenport, Iowa
- KURR in Hildale, Utah
- KUTZ-LP in Sacramento, California
- KVBL in Union, Oregon
- KVCM in Helena, Montana
- KVJM in Hearne, Texas
- KVWC-FM in Vernon, Texas
- KWLA in Anacoco, Louisiana
- KXSA-FM in Dermott, Arkansas
- KXVV in Victorville, California
- KXWY in Hudson, Wyoming
- KYDT in Sundance, Wyoming
- KYKV in Ellensburg, Washington
- KYMJ-LP in Carroll, Iowa
- KZKV in Karnes City, Texas
- KZSM-LP in San Marcos, Texas
- WAFY in Middletown, Maryland
- WAKO in Lawrenceville, Illinois
- WAUJ-LP in Laurel, Mississippi
- WCIK in Avoca, New York
- WCSJ in Morris, Illinois
- WDBG in Dexter, Georgia
- WEMV-LP in Vandalia, Illinois
- WEOM-LP in Thomasville, North Carolina
- WEUP in Moulton, Alabama
- WFEC-LP in Winston-Salem, North Carolina
- WFKZ in Plantation Key, Florida
- WFXA in Augusta, Georgia
- WFYY in Windermere, Florida
- WGBF in Henderson, Kentucky
- WGDN in Gladwin, Michigan
- WGFB in Rockton, Illinois
- WGY-FM in Albany, New York
- WHBR in Parkersburg, West Virginia
- WHME (FM) in South Bend, Indiana
- WHQA in Honea Path, South Carolina
- WIKQ in Tusculum, Tennessee
- WILK in Avoca, Pennsylvania
- WIRK in Indiantown, Florida
- WJGK in Newburgh, New York
- WJLJ in Etowah, Tennessee
- WJMA in Culpeper, Virginia
- WJSS-LP in Wilmington, North Carolina
- WJYI in Tifton, Georgia
- WKVE in Waynesburg, Pennsylvania
- WKZS in Covington, Indiana
- WLHC in Robbins, North Carolina
- WLQC in Sharpsburg, North Carolina
- WLXC in Columbia, South Carolina
- WMXX-FM in Jackson, Tennessee
- WNDH in Napoleon, Ohio
- WNHZ-LP in Littleton, New Hampshire
- WNMQ in Columbus, Mississippi
- WOGB in Reedsville, Wisconsin
- WOSM (FM) in Ocean Springs, Mississippi
- WOWY in State College, Pennsylvania
- WPKE in Coal Run, Kentucky
- WPNA-FM in Niles, Illinois
- WQFX in Russell, Pennsylvania
- WQNU in Lyndon, Kentucky
- WQUS in Lapeer, Michigan
- WRAC (FM) in West Union, Ohio
- WRHS in Grasonville, Maryland
- WRON in Lewisburg, West Virginia
- WSYN in Surfside Beach, South Carolina
- WTOJ in Carthage, New York
- WUAG in Greensboro, North Carolina
- WUGR-LP in Miaramar, Florida
- WVLP-LP in Valparaiso, Indiana
- WVSC in Port Royal, South Carolina
- WVUV-FM in Fagaitua, American Samoa
- WWLA in Johnstown, Ohio
- WWLT in Manchester, Kentucky
- WWOF in Tallahassee, Florida
- WWWF-FM in Bay Shore, New York
- WXEC-LP in Eureka, Illinois
- WZLB in Valparaiso, Florida
- WZKC in Royalton, Vermont
- WZLO in Dover-Foxcroft, Maine
- WZOZ in Oneonta, New York

== Vietnam ==
- Tay Ninh Radio in Tay Ninh Province
