= XHITO-FM =

Radio station in Irapuato, Guanajuato, Mexico

- Irapuato, Guanajuato; Mexico
- Frequency: 106.3 MHz
- Branding: Radio Lobo

Programming
- Format: Regional Mexican

Ownership
- Owner: Grupo RADAR; (Radio XHITO Irapuato, S. de R.L. de C.V. (pending sale to Corporación Bajío Comunicaciones))
- Operator: Corporación Bajío Comunicaciones
- Sister stations: XHJTA-FM, XHXV-FM, XHSJI-FM, XHCEL-FM, XHY-FM, XHQRO-FM, XHJHS-FM, XHRE-FM

History
- First air date: October 22, 1993 (concession)
- Call sign meaning: IrapuaTO

Technical information
- ERP: 7.5 kW

XHITO-FM is a radio station on 106.3 FM in Irapuato, Guanajuato. It is currently operated by Corporación Bajío Comunicaciones and carries a Regional Mexican format known as Radio Lobo.

== History ==
XHITO received its concession in October 1993. It was owned by José Trinidad Rubio Barba. Grupo ACIR acquired the concession in 1996.

ACIR left the group in Irapuato along with XHJTA-FM on December 31, 2025. In February 2026, XHITO adopted the Radio Lobo Regional Mexican format.
