= 920 AM =

AM radio frequency

The following radio stations broadcast on AM frequency 920 kHz: 920 AM is a Regional broadcast frequency.

== Canada ==
Call sign	City of license	Daytime power (kW)	Nighttime power (kW)	Transmitter coordinates
CBKG	Granisle, British Columbia	0.04	0.04	54.881389°N 126.201667°W
CBWF	Mackenzie, British Columbia	0.04	0.04	55.331111°N 123.095833°W
CFRY	Portage la Prairie, Manitoba	25	15	49.9692°N 98.3742°W
CKNX	Wingham, Ontario	10	1	43.8431°N 81.3478°W

== Mexico ==
- XELCM-AM in Lázaro Cárdenas, Michoacán
- XELE-AM in Tampico, Tamaulipas
- XELT-AM in Huentitan el Bajo (Guadalajara), Jalisco
- XERE-AM in Ojo Seco, Guanajuato
- XESTRC-AM in Tenabo, Campeche
- XEZAR-AM in San Bernardino Tlaxcalancingo, Puebla

== Paraguay ==
- ZP1 at Asunción.

== United States ==
Call sign	City of license	Facility ID	Class	Daytime power (kW)	Nighttime power (kW)	Unlimited power (kW)	Transmitter coordinates
KDHL	Faribault, Minnesota	54634	B	3.3	1		44.263056°N 93.274722°W
KGTK	Olympia, Washington	47567	D	3	0.007		47.062222°N 122.830278°W
KIHM	Reno, Nevada	53707	B	4.8	0.85		39.513889°N 119.714444°W
KKGX	Palm Springs, California	67355	B	5	1		33.858056°N 116.494167°W
KKLS	Rapid City, South Dakota	61320	D	5	0.111		44.061944°N 103.175556°W
KLMR	Lamar, Colorado	174	B	5	0.5		38.114722°N 102.621111°W
KQBU	El Paso, Texas	67065	B	1	0.36		31.735833°N 106.373333°W
KRLV	Las Vegas, Nevada	38448	B	5	0.5		36.190278°N 115.176389°W
KSHO	Lebanon, Oregon	18038	B			1	44.573611°N 122.918056°W
KSRM	Soldotna, Alaska	35635	B			5	60.513611°N 151.188611°W
KSVA	Albuquerque, New Mexico	11230	B	1	0.13		35.132222°N 106.621667°W
KVEC	San Luis Obispo, California	10870	B	1	0.5		35.299444°N 120.673333°W
KVEL	Vernal, Utah	2934	B	5	1		40.491667°N 109.529167°W
KVIN	Ceres, California	12062	B	0.5	2.5		37.596944°N 121.070833°W (daytime); 37.631944°N 120.751667°W (nighttime)
KWAD	Wadena, Minnesota	28649	B	1	1		46.370278°N 95.153889°W
KWUL	St. Louis, Missouri	49042	B	0.45	0.5		38.759167°N 90.05°W
KWYS	West Yellowstone, Montana	24434	D	1	0.038		44.648889°N 111.097222°W
KXLY	Spokane, Washington	61947	B	25	5.4		47.608611°N 117.373611°W
KYFR	Shenandoah, Iowa	20806	B	5	2.5		40.622778°N 95.245°W
KYST	Texas City, Texas	27298	B	5	1		29.4175°N 94.936667°W
WBAA	West Lafayette, Indiana	53946	B	5	1		40.341389°N 86.883611°W
WBOX	Bogalusa, Louisiana	6317	D	1			30.841389°N 89.835°W
WDMC	Melbourne, Florida	68615	B	8	4		28.120833°N 80.72°W (daytime); 28.120833°N 80.719444°W (nighttime)
WGHQ	Kingston, New York	27396	D	1	0.035		41.886944°N 73.971389°W
WGKA	Atlanta, Georgia	65976	B	14	0.49		33.809722°N 84.356389°W
WGOL	Russellville, Alabama	60506	D	1	0.04		34.513889°N 87.715278°W
WHJD	Hazlehurst, Georgia	30660	D	0.5	0.035		31.854167°N 82.566667°W
WHJJ	Providence, Rhode Island	37234	B	5	5		41.781389°N 71.331944°W
WKVA	Lewistown, Pennsylvania	9948	B	1	0.5		40.579167°N 77.571667°W
WLIV	Livingston, Tennessee	70520	D	1	0.038		36.374444°N 85.305556°W
WMNI	Columbus, Ohio	49110	B	1	0.5		39.892222°N 83.0475°W
WMOK	Metropolis, Illinois	73275	B	1	0.75		37.153333°N 88.709167°W (daytime); 37.148889°N 88.636111°W (nighttime)
WMPL	Hancock, Michigan	13868	D	1	0.206		47.101389°N 88.590556°W
WNJE	Trenton, New Jersey	25011	B	1.4	1		40.255278°N 74.862222°W
WOKY	Milwaukee, Wisconsin	63917	B	5	1		42.975556°N 88.065556°W
WPCM	Burlington-Graham, North Carolina	9082	D	5	0.055		36.097222°N 79.484167°W
WPTL	Canton, North Carolina	60572	D	0.5	0.038		35.520833°N 82.806667°W
WTCW	Whitesburg, Kentucky	64431	D	4.2	0.043		37.146111°N 82.766944°W
WURA	Quantico, Virginia	160224	B	7	0.97		38.568056°N 77.338889°W
WXKD	Brantley, Alabama	40900	D	0.45			31.707222°N 86.22°W
WZST	Fairmont, West Virginia	21171	D	5	0.2		39.4675°N 80.205556°W
