= WOBG (AM) =

Radio station in Clarksburg, West Virginia (1937–2009)

- Clarksburg, West Virginia; United States
- Broadcast area: Clarksburg, West Virginia; Harrison County, West Virginia
- Frequency: 1400 kHz
- Branding: Memories 1400

Programming
- Format: Adult standards

Ownership
- Owner: Burbach Broadcasting Co.; (Burbach of DE, LLC)
- Sister stations: WGIE, WGYE, WHTI, WXKX

History
- First air date: April 21, 1937
- Last air date: December 17, 2009
- Former call signs: WEXP (1936, CP); WBLK (1936–1957); WBOY (1957–1976); WBBN (1976–1980); WPQZ (1980–1985); WKKW (1985–1987); WPQZ (1987–1989)
- Call sign meaning: "Oldies But Goodies"

Technical information
- Class: C
- Power: 1,000 Watts day and night

WOBG was an adult standards formatted broadcast radio station licensed to Clarksburg, West Virginia, serving Clarksburg and Harrison County in West Virginia. WOBG was owned and operated by Burbach Broadcasting Company.

== History ==
WBLK went on the air on April 21, 1937. It was owned by the Exponent Company of Clarksburg and began its operations on 1370 kHz as a daytime-only station. Within months of signing on, however, the Federal Communications Commission approved the station's request to go unlimited time, saying that any interference to station WPAY would not be sufficient to deny the application. The station's base in the Robinson Grand Theater was devastated by a $350,000 fire on May 31, 1939; alert staffers saved equipment and transcriptions, and the station was back on the air within 45 minutes, using emergency studios at its transmitter site, to report news of the blaze, which endangered 20 firefighters.

WBLK was sold in 1941, days after moving to 1400 kHz in the wake of NARBA, to the Charleston Broadcasting Company. Sales to the News Publishing Company (in 1947) and the Ohio Valley Broadcasting Corporation (in 1951) followed, as did a venture into television. In 1952, WBLK filed for channel 12 in Clarksburg, seeking to trade on the TV first call rights it held from its NBC radio affiliation. Two issues delayed the application—and the television station—for years. The first was a challenge by the publisher of Clarksburg's two daily newspapers, saying that Ohio Valley's ownership of the TV station would result in a monopoly; this led to the United States Court of Appeals for the Fourth Circuit overturning the FCC's grant. The newspapers withdrew their obligations in 1957, while the FCC ruled that new owners WSTV, Inc.—owners of WSTV radio and television in Steubenville, Ohio—could set up the station in Clarksburg because there was minimal overlap between the two cities. WBLK became WBOY in 1957, call letters that the new WBOY-TV would also adopt before its sign-on in 1958.

The Rust Craft station group held on to WBOY radio and television through 1976, when it sold the two to separate buyers. The WBBN Broadcasting Company, headed by Lee Dixon, acquired the radio station for $90,000; the TV station kept the WBOY designation, and the radio station became WBBN, retaining the middle-of-the-road music format and NBC affiliation of WBOY. The format survived another call letter change when Allegheny Broadcasting bought the station in 1980 and renamed it WPQZ. Allegheny did not hold on long, selling WPQZ for $128,000 two years later to the Gilcom Corporation of West Virginia, making it a sister to stations in Weirton and Altoona, Pennsylvania. Gilcom sold WPQZ to Radio Two, owner of Clarksburg FM station WKKW, for $387,500 just 14 months later. Between 1985 and January 1987—when Radio Two's sister company Radio One sold off the FM—the two stations formed a simulcast, with the AM adopting the WKKW call letters and its country music format.

On May 5, 1989, WPQZ became WOBG, part of a year of major changes that included a format flip to oldies and the station's sale for $100,000 to Hilber Corporation, owned by Robert Steinhilber. Later in 1990, Hilber bought the station's second FM partner, new station WXKI in Salem, which became WOBG-FM after having signed on December 31, 1989. Hilber sold both stations to Burbach Broadcasting for nearly $625,000 in 1998; the sale price included the assumption of almost $265,000 in debt.

Ultimately, aging equipment sealed WOBG's fate in 2009, by which time the station was broadcasting adult standards music. In asking for authority to remain silent with the FCC, Burbach informed the commission that WOBG went off the air on December 17 of that year due to a series of fatal failures of its transmitter. The station never returned to the air, with its license expiring as a matter of law on December 18, 2010.
