= Build with America =

Build With America
- Genre: Home improvement Radio Show
- Running time: 1 hour
- Country of origin: United States
- Language: English
- Home station: Genesis Communications Network
- Created by: "The Cajun Contractor" Michael King (radio host)
- Website: Build With America
- Podcast

Build With America is a national radio program and campaign. This program features American-made home construction and home improvement products. The expressed intention of this program is to inform the consumer of American-made home construction and home improvement products, and to increase the consumer's purchases of these products. The creation of this program was inspired by the Bozeman, Montana home that was built with 100% American-made home construction and home improvement products.

== Host ==
"The Cajun Contractor" Michael King is the host of Home Talk USA. He is the co-creator of Home Talk USA and is a licensed contractor in the New Orleans, LA area. He hosts with his signature opening "Yaahee! I am the originator not the duplicator. Please do not except no substitutions. I was green before green was even cool".

"The Cajun Contractor" Michael King is considered to be the most recognizable name in all of Home Improvement Radio, according to DAR.FM.
