= XHXF-FM =

Radio station in León, Guanajuato

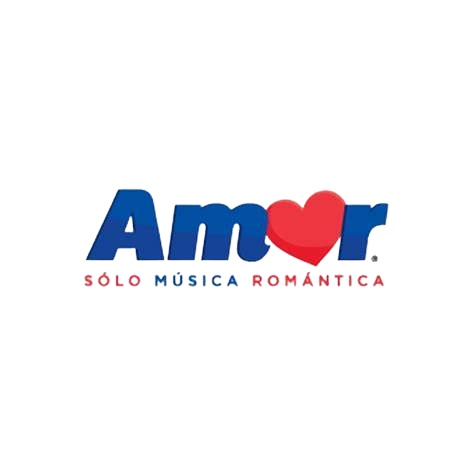

León, Guanajuato; Mexico
- Frequency: 103.1 FM
- Branding: Amor

Programming
- Format: Romantic

Ownership
- Owner: Grupo ACIR; (Radio XHXF, S. de R.L. de C.V.)
- Sister stations: XHPQ-FM, XHJTA-FM, XHITO-FM

History
- First air date: April 15, 1964 (concession)
- Former call signs: XEXF-AM
- Former frequencies: 1140 kHz

Technical information
- Class: B1
- ERP: 15 kW
- HAAT: −88.6 meters (−291 ft)
- Transmitter coordinates: 21°06′00.2″N 101°38′25.8″W

Links
- Website: 103.1 MIX León Website

XHXF-FM is a radio station on 103.1 FM in León, Guanajuato. XHXF is owned by Grupo ACIR and carries its Amor romantic format.

== History ==
XHXF began as XEXF-AM 1140. It received its first concession on April 15, 1964, and operated as a daytimer owned by Gustavo Montes Robles and transmitting from Romita. In 1977, Montes Robles sold XEXF to Radio Bajío, S.A., and in the 2000s, under ACIR, it began broadcasting at night.

XEXF migrated to FM after being authorized to do so in 2011.
