= WBKE =

WBKE may refer to:

- WBKE-FM, a radio station (89.5 FM) licensed to serve North Manchester, Indiana, United States, which operated from 1968 to 2016
- WRLF (AM), a radio station (1490 AM) licensed to serve Fairmont, West Virginia, United States, which held the call sign WBKE from 2018 to 2025 and in 2026
- Telupid Airport, in Telupid, Sabah, Malaysia (ICAO code WBKE)
