= WXKX =

Coordinates: 39°17′27″N 80°18′56″W

Clarksburg, West Virginia; United States
- Broadcast area: Harrison County, West Virginia
- Frequency: 1340 kHz
- Branding: News/Talk 1340

Programming
- Format: Defunct (was News/talk)

Ownership
- Owner: Burbach Broadcasting Co.
- Sister stations: WGIE, WGYE, WHTI

History
- First air date: 1946
- Last air date: 2023
- Former call signs: WHAR (1946–2001)

Technical information
- Licensing authority: FCC
- Facility ID: 67102
- Class: C
- Power: 1,000 watts day and night

Links
- Public license information: Public file; LMS
- Website: newstalk1340.net

WXKX was a radio station in Clarksburg, West Virginia, United States. WXKX broadcast from 1946 to 2023 and was last owned and operated by Burbach Broadcasting Co.

The station closed in August 2023, with owner Burbach Broadcasting telling the Federal Communications Commission that "expenses of operation as well as repairs and maintenance are no longer economically feasible". Burbach surrendered the station's license to the FCC on August 15, 2023, and it was cancelled on September 8.
