= WZST =

WZST may refer to:

- WZST (AM), a radio station (920 AM) licensed to Fairmont, West Virginia, United States
- WZST-FM, a radio station (100.9 FM) licensed to Westover, West Virginia
- WLND, a radio station (98.1 FM) licensed to Signal Mountain, Tennessee, United States, which held the call sign WZST from 1994 to 1998
- WBKY, a radio station (95.9 FM) licensed to Stoughton, Wisconsin, United States, which held the call sign WZST from 1992 to 1994
- WJJX, a radio station (102.7 FM) licensed to Appomattox, Virginia, United States, which held the call sign WZST from 1989 to 1992
- WQBQ, a radio station (1410 AM) licensed to Leesburg, Florida, United States, which held the call sign WZST from 1966 to 1985
