= WRLF =

WRLF may refer to:

- WRLF (AM), a radio station (1490 AM) licensed to Fairmont, West Virginia, United States
- WRLF-FM, a radio station (94.3 FM) licensed to Fairmont, West Virginia
- the ICAO code for Nunukan Airport
