= WGYE =

Simulcasting WZST Fairmont
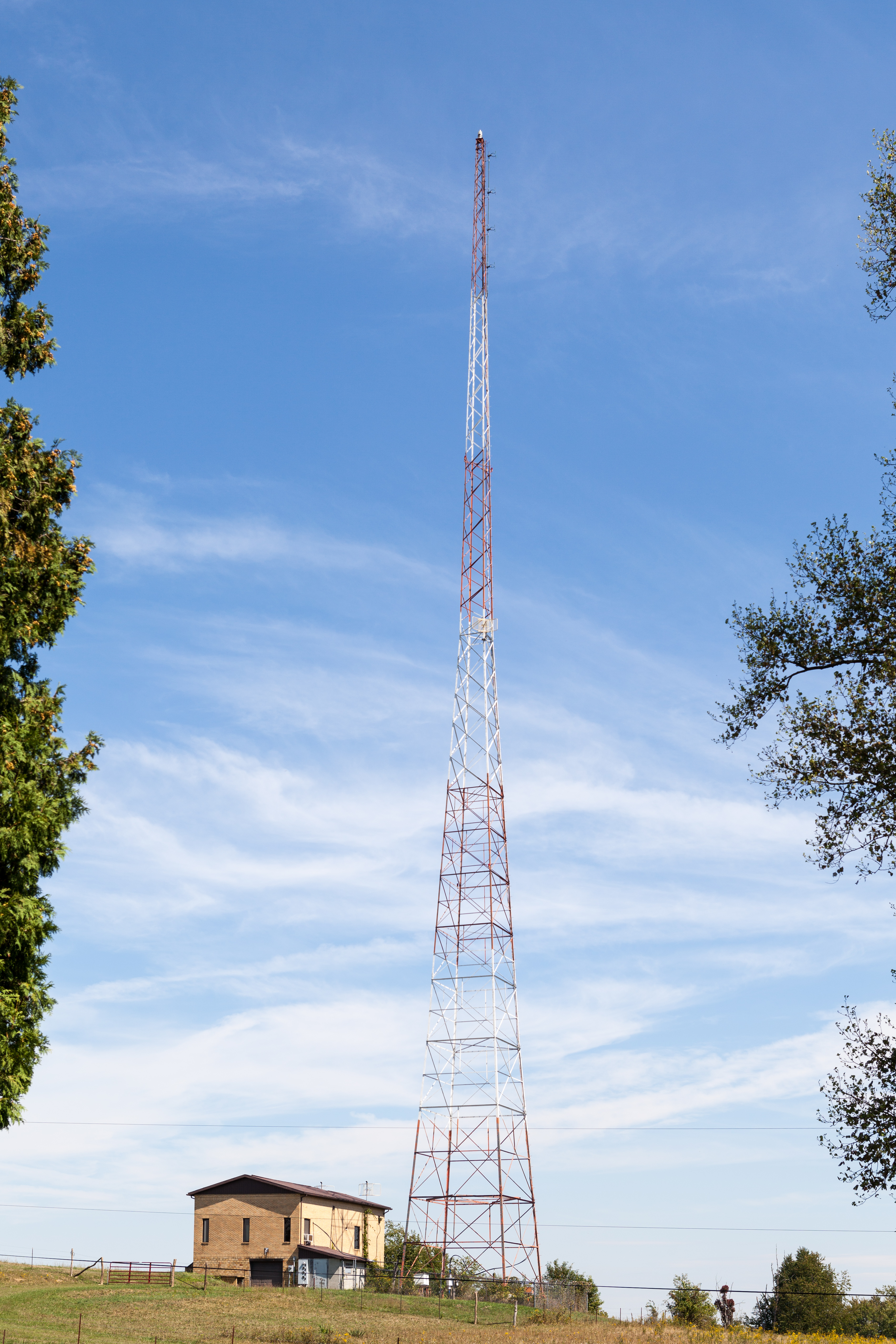
- Tower on Tower Hill Road, Fairmont, West Virginia, seen from the adjacent Grove Cemetery
- Mannington, West Virginia; United States
- Broadcast area: North-Central West Virginia
- Frequency: 102.7 MHz
- Branding: The Torch

Programming
- Format: Defunct ( was Conservative talk)
- Affiliations: Genesis Communications Network; Townhall News; Westwood One

Ownership
- Owner: John Fredricks; (Disruptor Radio LLC)
- Sister stations: WHTI; WZST-FM; WZST; WRLF; WRLF-FM

History
- First air date: 1992 (as WTUS)
- Last air date: 2026
- Former call signs: WTUS (1989–2001)
- Call sign meaning: play on "Froggy" (former format)

Technical information
- Licensing authority: FCC
- Facility ID: 32202
- Class: A
- ERP: 3,200 watts
- HAAT: 138 meters (453 ft)
- Transmitter coordinates: 39°28′3″N 80°12′20″W

Links
- Public license information: Public file; LMS
- Webcast: Listen live
- Website: www.wvthetorch.com

WGYE (102.7 FM) was a conservative talk formatted broadcast radio station licensed to Mannington, West Virginia, serving North-Central West Virginia. WGYE was last owned and operated by John Fredricks' Disruptor Radio LLC.

== History ==
This radio station first began as WTUS, and was assigned that call sign on October 31, 1989, more than a year after the construction permit was first granted in May 1988. However, the permit was sold to Joseph Donald Powers and partner Al Sergi in 1991 for $23,000.

Powers and Sergi finally brought the station on the air in the fall of 1992, with the moniker "Today's U.S. Country", maintaining studios and offices along Locust Avenue in neighboring Fairmont, where the station remains today.

Powers and Sergi sold WTUS in the late 1990s to Pittsburgh-based Burbach Broadcasting. Sergi today owns WSGB in Sutton, West Virginia, and three other area stations.

The station had a country format for its entire existence until it was sold to LHTC Media effective September 1, 2023; on September 11, the station flipped to contemporary hit radio, assuming the format of WHTI, as "Hot 102.7".

On February 5, 2024, WGYE changed its format to a simulcast of conservative talk-formatted WMMN (920 AM), branded as "The Torch".

== Translator ==
WGYE also simulcasts on a 250-watt translator station W237FP which transmits on 95.3 MHz. W237FP is licensed to and serves Morgantown, West Virginia.
