= WOBG =

WOBG may refer to:

- WOBG (AM), a defunct radio station (1400 AM), formerly licensed to Clarksburg, West Virginia
- WHTI, a radio station (105.7 FM), licensed to Salem, West Virginia, which held the call sign WOBG-FM from 1990 to 2018
- WYYC, a radio station (1250 AM), licensed to York, Pennsylvania, which held the call sign WOBG from 1985 to 1988
- SS Shawnee, a passenger ship which held the call sign WOBG from 1934 to 1949
