= XHPQ-FM =

Radio station in León, Guanajuato, Mexico

- León, Guanajuato; Mexico
- Frequency: 97.5 MHz
- Branding: Match FM

Programming
- Format: Hot adult contemporary

Ownership
- Owner: Grupo ACIR; (Radio XHPQ León, S. de R. L. de C. V.)
- Sister stations: XHXF-FM, XHJTA-FM, XHITO-FM

History
- First air date: November 12, 1980 (concession)

Technical information
- Class: B
- ERP: 31.54 kW
- HAAT: −42.2 meters (−138 ft)
- Transmitter coordinates: 21°06′00″N 101°38′26″W

Links
- Website: matchmx.fm

XHPQ-FM is a radio station on 97.5 FM in León, Guanajuato. XHPQ is owned by Grupo ACIR and carries its Match FM hot adult contemporary format.

== History ==
XHPQ received its concession on November 12, 1980. It was owned by Juan Baptista Campo Rodríguez. ACIR acquired the concession in 2000. The station was an adult contemporary outlet known as Stereo Nova, and later Stereo Amistad, before becoming a pop station as Digital 97.5 in the 1990s.

=== Match ===
On December 25, 2019, Disney and ACIR announced they were mutually ending their relationship, which had covered twelve Mexican cities. Ten of the twelve Radio Disney stations, including XHPQ, were transitioned to ACIR's replacement pop format, Match.
