= 1300 AM =

AM radio frequency

The following radio stations broadcast on AM frequency 1300 kHz: The Federal Communications Commission classifies 1300 AM as a Regional broadcast frequency. See List of broadcast station classes.

== Argentina ==
- LRA5 Nacional in Rosario
- Plus in Lanus, Buenos Aires
- La Salada in Lomas de Zamora, Buenos Aires

== Mexico ==
- XEAWL-AM in Jacala, Hidalgo
- XECPAD-AM in Xalapa Veracruz
- XEP-AM in Cd. Juárez, Chihuahua
- XEXV-AM in Arroyo Seco, Guanajuato
- XEXW-AM in Nogales, Sonora

== United States ==
| Call sign | City of license | Facility ID | Class | Daytime power (kW) | Nighttime power (kW) | Unlimited power (kW) | Transmitter coordinates |
|---|---|---|---|---|---|---|---|
| KAKC | Tulsa, Oklahoma | 11939 | B | 5 | 1 | | 35.994444°N 95.8575°W |
| KAZN | Pasadena, California | 51426 | B | 23 | 4.2 | | 34.118889°N 118.081667°W |
| KBRL | McCook, Nebraska | 57516 | D | 5 | 0.136 | | 40.191944°N 100.651667°W |
| KCMY | Carson City, Nevada | 40801 | D | 5 | 0.12 | | 39.166111°N 119.725833°W |
| KCSF | Colorado Springs, Colorado | 62039 | B | 5 | 1 | | 38.812778°N 104.814167°W |
| KDSO | Phoenix, Oregon | 17468 | B | 20 | 5 | | 42.295556°N 122.804167°W |
| KGLO | Mason City, Iowa | 30114 | B | 5 | 5 | | 43.053611°N 93.204722°W |
| KHTW | Lumberton, Texas | 31108 | D | 1.7 | 0.02 | | 30.232222°N 94.211389°W |
| KKOL | Seattle, Washington | 20355 | B | 50 | 3.2 | | 47.655278°N 122.518333°W |
| KKUB | Brownfield, Texas | 7331 | D | 1 | 0.12 | | 33.180278°N 102.246944°W |
| KLAR | Laredo, Texas | 14656 | D | 1 | 0.08 | | 27.529167°N 99.520833°W |
| KLER | Orofino, Idaho | 9886 | B | 5 | 1 | | 46.478056°N 116.242778°W |
| KMMO | Marshall, Missouri | 43228 | D | 1 | 0.068 | | 39.134167°N 93.221944°W |
| KOLY | Mobridge, South Dakota | 43330 | B | 5 | 0.111 | | 45.535278°N 100.345833°W |
| KPMI | Bemidji, Minnesota | 160495 | B | 2.5 | 0.6 | | 47.442222°N 94.865833°W |
| KPMO | Mendocino, California | 31596 | D | 5 | 0.077 | | 39.3425°N 123.780833°W |
| KROP | Brawley, California | 63470 | B | 1 | 0.475 | | 33.011111°N 115.521111°W |
| KSMD | Searcy, Arkansas | 11743 | D | 5 | | | 35.2575°N 91.730278°W |
| KSYB | Shreveport, Louisiana | 49016 | D | 5 | 0.03 | | 32.53°N 93.804444°W |
| KTDS | The Dalles, Oregon | 49857 | D | 1 | 0.013 | | 45.581667°N 121.131389°W |
| KVET | Austin, Texas | 35850 | B | 5 | 1 | | 30.375°N 97.716111°W |
| KWRU | Fresno, California | 65774 | B | 5 | 1 | | 36.770556°N 119.75°W |
| WAVZ | New Haven, Connecticut | 11920 | B | 1 | 1 | | 41.287778°N 72.946667°W |
| WBSA | Boaz, Alabama | 71098 | D | 1 | 0.037 | | 34.213889°N 86.152778°W |
| WBZQ | Huntington, Indiana | 72788 | D | 0.5 | 0.019 | | 40.875278°N 85.474167°W |
| WCKI | Greer, South Carolina | 60503 | D | 1 | 0.094 | | 34.9275°N 82.261667°W |
| WFFG | Marathon, Florida | 65664 | B | | | 2.5 | 24.691111°N 81.108333°W |
| WFRX | West Frankfort, Illinois | 53979 | D | 1 | 0.06 | | 37.884444°N 88.928889°W |
| WGDJ | Rensselaer, New York | 40768 | B | 10 | 8 | | 42.589722°N 73.743611°W |
| WJBB | Winder, Georgia | 63385 | D | 0.65 | 0.05 | | 33.927778°N 83.726944°W |
| WJDA | Quincy, Massachusetts | 61159 | D | 1 | 0.072 | | 42.259722°N 70.976667°W |
| WJMO | Cleveland, Ohio | 41389 | B | | | 5 | 41.341111°N 81.741667°W |
| WJYP | St. Albans, West Virginia | 73176 | D | 1 | 0.049 | | 38.395278°N 81.85°W |
| WJZ | Baltimore, Maryland | 28636 | B | 5 | 5 | | 39.333333°N 76.770278°W |
| WKCY | Harrisonburg, Virginia | 41815 | D | 6.4 | 0.005 | | 38.463889°N 78.806944°W |
| WKQK | Cocoa Beach, Florida | 55005 | B | 5 | 1 | | 28.343889°N 80.768333°W |
| WLMZ | West Hazleton, Pennsylvania | 22667 | B | 5 | 0.5 | | 40.940556°N 76.001944°W |
| WLNC | Laurinburg, North Carolina | 22191 | D | 0.5 | 0.074 | | 34.783333°N 79.439444°W |
| WLXG | Lexington, Kentucky | 36114 | B | 2.5 | 1 | | 38.097222°N 84.529167°W |
| WMTM | Moultrie, Georgia | 12382 | D | 5 | 0.06 | | 31.17°N 83.747222°W |
| WMTN | Morristown, Tennessee | 22338 | D | 5 | 0.096 | | 36.204167°N 83.3325°W |
| WNEA | Newnan, Georgia | 73317 | D | 1 | 0.05 | | 33.375278°N 84.785556°W |
| WNQM | Nashville, Tennessee | 73349 | B | 50 | 5 | | 36.208333°N 86.893889°W |
| WOAD | Jackson, Mississippi | 50404 | B | 3.6 | 0.73 | | 32.386667°N 90.163056°W |
| WOOD | Grand Rapids, Michigan | 73604 | B | 20 | 20 | | 42.756111°N 85.656667°W |
| WOSW | Fulton, New York | 52370 | D | 1 | 0.04 | | 43.294722°N 76.443056°W |
| WPDX | Morgantown, West Virginia | 3 | D | 2.5 | 0.044 | | 39.627778°N 79.969722°W |
| WPNH | Plymouth, New Hampshire | 52128 | D | 5 | 0.082 | | 43.775556°N 71.705556°W |
| WQBN | Temple Terrace, Florida | 74155 | D | 5 | 0.16 | | 27.9475°N 82.395833°W |
| WQPM | Princeton, Minnesota | 59618 | D | 1 | 0.083 | | 45.552778°N 93.581667°W |
| WRDZ | La Grange, Illinois | 28309 | B | 4.5 | 4 | | 41.674722°N 87.7625°W |
| WSSG | Goldsboro, North Carolina | 14390 | D | 1 | 0.049 | | 35.402222°N 78.022222°W |
| WSYD | Mount Airy, North Carolina | 64066 | B | 5 | 1 | | 36.503333°N 80.593056°W |
| WTIL | Mayaguez, Puerto Rico | 40780 | B | 5 | 0.8 | | 18.183333°N 67.167778°W |
| WTLS | Tallassee, Alabama | 48011 | D | 1.2 | 0.018 | | 32.510833°N 85.8925°W |
| WWCH | Clarion, Pennsylvania | 11662 | D | 0.85 | 0.028 | | 41.199167°N 79.356944°W |
| WXRL | Lancaster, New York | 17068 | B | 5 | 2.5 | | 42.8825°N 78.631389°W |
