= Wura =

Wura may refer to:

- Wura, Queensland, a locality in the Rockhampton Region, Australia
- WURA, a Tejano broadcast radio station licensed to Quantico, Virginia, serving Metro Washington
- Wura (TV series), a 2023 Nigerian telenovela
- Wura-Natasha Ogunji (born 1970) is an artist and performer based in Lagos
