= KSPN =

KSPN may refer to:

- KSPN (AM), a radio station (710 AM) licensed to Los Angeles, California, United States
- KSPN-FM, a radio station (103.1 FM) licensed to Aspen, Colorado, United States
- KSPN 2, a cable television station on Saipan, Northern Mariana Islands, United States
