= WCIS =

WCIS may refer to:

- WCIS (AM), a radio station (760 AM) licensed to serve Morganton, North Carolina, United States
- WCIS-FM, a radio station (105.1 FM) licensed to serve Deruyter, New York, United States
- Wellington College International Shanghai
