= WTCS =

WTCS may refer to:

- WTCS-LP, a low-power radio station (91.9 FM) licensed to serve Chattanooga, Tennessee, United States; see List of radio stations in Tennessee
- WRLF (AM), a radio station (1490 AM) licensed to serve Fairmont, West Virginia, United States, which held the call sign WTCS until 2018
- Western Technical-Commercial School, a high school in Toronto, Ontario, Canada
- Wisconsin Technical College System, a system of 16 public technical colleges administered by the state of Wisconsin, United States
- World Triathlon Championship Series, a series of elite level triathlon races.
