= Radio Nacional del Paraguay =

Paraguayan radio broadcaster

Radio Nacional del Paraguay (National Radio of Paraguay) is the public radio broadcaster of Paraguay. It is a division of the Ministry of Information Technologies and Communication (Ministerio de Tecnologías de la Información y Comunicación) alongside national public TV channel Paraguay TV. Programs are in Spanish and in the Guarani language.

In Asunción, it has two stations, the 100,000-watt 920 AM (call sign ZP1) and ZPV1 on 95.1 FM, with separate programming. RNP also operates services in Pilar (ZP12, 700 AM) and San Pedro de Ycuamandiyú (105.9 FM).

== History ==
RNP was established on 2 September 1942. It came to occupy a major role in the military dictatorship of Alfredo Stroessner; Judith María Vera, who served as director general of RNP in the late 2000s, called it "an efficient tool of disinformation". It was known for the program La voz del coloradismo and also originated the other two daily required broadcasts of all radio stations as cadenas nacionales.

By the mid-2000s, the shortwave service had been discontinued.

In 2001, the Paraguayan government took over the Pilar station, which had previously been the private Radio Carlos Antonio López; it became a budget item in 2004. A 2005 column in ABC Color argued that the ownership of the Pilar and Asunción AM stations was illegal, given that law reserved for the government one national AM frequency and FM frequencies in each department. The San Pedro FM outlet began broadcasting on 8 August 2013.
