= KMET (AM) =

Coordinates: 33°55′49.1″N 116°55′23.1″W

- Banning, California; United States
- Broadcast area: Riverside—San Bernardino, California
- Frequency: 1490 kHz
- Branding: Smart Talk 1490 AM

Programming
- Format: Talk
- Affiliations: ABC News Radio; Genesis Communications Network; USA Radio Network; Westwood One; Los Angeles Angels; Los Angeles Clippers; Los Angeles Lakers; Los Angeles Rams

Ownership
- Owner: Christopher Miller; (KMET, LLC)

History
- First air date: 1981
- Former call signs: KGUD (1981–1987)
- Call sign meaning: The Inland Empire metropolitan area

Technical information
- Licensing authority: FCC
- Facility ID: 55239
- Class: C
- Power: 1,000 watts unlimited
- Translator: 98.1 K251CC (Beaumont)

Links
- Public license information: Public file; LMS
- Webcast: Listen live
- Website: www.kmet1490am.com

KMET (1490 kHz) is a commercial AM radio station that is licensed to Banning, California, and serves the eastern part of the Riverside—San Bernardino area. The station is owned by Christopher Miller, through licensee KMET, LLC, and broadcasts a talk radio format.

== Programming ==
KMET is an ABC radio affiliate and airs syndicated talk programming from hosts such as Clark Howard, Dave Ramsey, Tyler Jorgenson, and Kevin McCullough, as well as sports coverage. Local on-air talent includes Brett Malak, Aaron Michael Sanchez, Paul Amadeus Lane, and Mitch McClellan.

KMET sports programming includes Los Angeles Rams and Los Angeles Lakers games. From 2011 through the end of the 2016–2017 NHL season, KMET was the Inland Empire radio affiliate of the Los Angeles Kings.

== History ==
The station was first licensed in 1981 as KGUD. It served as a replacement for KPAS, which operated from 1948 to 1972.

On March 1, 1987, KGUD adopted the KMET call letters to represent the Riverside—San Bernardino metropolitan area and Hemet, a community south of Banning. KMET aired a middle of the road format branded "The Mighty Met" in honor of the defunct Los Angeles rock station that previously held the KMET call letters (94.7 FM, now KTWV).

Prior to July 2007, KMET aired a smooth jazz music format branded as "Your Smooth Oasis". Before that, formats included country music in 1995 and all-sports.
