= XHXV-FM =

Radio station in Tierra Blanca–León, Guanajuato, Mexico

XHXV-FM/XEXV-AM
- León-Arroyo Seco-Tierra Blanca, Guanajuato; Mexico
- Frequency: 88.9 FM / 1300 AM
- Branding: Radar

Programming
- Format: Pop

Ownership
- Owner: Grupo Radiorama; (León Radio XV, S.A. de C.V.)
- Operator: Corporación Bajío Comunicaciones
- Sister stations: XHJTA-FM, XHITO-FM

History
- First air date: May 12, 1972 (concession); 1994 (FM)

Technical information
- Class: B1
- Power: 10 kW day/0.75 kW night
- ERP: 10 kW
- HAAT: −63.1 meters (−207 ft) (FM)
- Transmitter coordinates: 21.122734°N 101.691599°W (FM); 20.988543°N 101.809834°W (AM)

Links
- Webcast: Listen live
- Website: www.radarfmleon.mx

XHXV-FM 88.9/XEXV-AM 1300 is a combo radio station based in León, Guanajuato, with FM transmitter in León, AM transmitter in Arroyo Seco, and listed location of Tierra Blanca. It is owned by Grupo Radiorama.

== History ==
XEXV received its concession on May 12, 1972. It was owned by Jaime Robledo Romero, who would later become Engineering Director of the Cámara Nacional de la Industria de Radio y Televisión (CIRT). The original station concession specified a location in San Francisco del Rincón. By the 1990s, it was an AM-FM combo owned by Fomento Radiofónico del Centro, which sold the station to Radiodifusoras Capital in 2006. In 2008, Capital sold XEXV/XHXV to Grupo Radiodigital Siglo XXI, a predecessor to Grupo Radio México and in turn Grupo Radio Centro.

The station was known as La Z with a Regional Mexican format until January 2022, when the station changed names and owners and became known as La Nueva. It then switched to pop in September 2022 when Corporación Bajío Comunicaciones leased the frequency and installed its Radar brand, heard on XHQRO-FM in the Querétaro market.
