= Televisión y Radio de Campeche =

Public broadcaster of the Mexican state of Campeche

XHCCA-TDT
San Francisco de Campeche; Mexico
- Channels: Digital: 30 (UHF); Virtual: 4
- Branding: Televisión y Radio de Campeche; TRC

Programming
- Affiliations: Canal 44 de Guadalajara; Canal Once; DW

Ownership
- Owner: Gobierno del Estado de Campeche

History
- Founded: Early 1980s
- First air date: October 31, 1988
- Former call signs: XHCCA-TV (1985-2015)
- Former channel numbers: 4 (analog, 1985-2015); 30 (virtual, 2015-16)
- Former affiliations: CORTV
- Call sign meaning: Campeche Campeche

Technical information
- Licensing authority: CRT
- ERP: 10 kW

Links
- Website: TRC

Televisión y Radio de Campeche (TRC) is the state broadcaster of the Mexican state of Campeche, It also airs programming from Canal 44 de Guadalajara, Canal Once and DW.

TRC operates two radio stations, one FM and one AM, as "TRC Radio"; XHRTC-FM 89.3 in San Francisco de Campeche and XESTRC-AM 920 in Tenabo, as well as the television station of San Francisco de Campeche.

== History ==
The first public broadcaster in Campeche began in the early 1980s during the government of Alfonso Millán Luna, producing local opt-out programming for Televisión de la República Mexicana. When TRM became part of Imevisión in 1985, the broadcaster moved to new facilities and changed its name to COCATEC, becoming officially incorporated on October 31, 1988. In 1989, XETEB signed on as part of a partnership between the state government and the Instituto Mexicano de la Radio, which would last until 2004. In 1997, COCATEC became TRC.

Long plagued by deteriorating equipment, a lack of financial attention and outmoded facilities, TRC has been hard-pressed to meet deadlines related to the digital television transition as well as to change its AM radio station to the FM band. In 2015, the station accomplished both, signing an accord with the SPR to share transmission infrastructure, thereby allowing it to begin digital broadcasts, and receiving a public concession to build a new FM station. The STRC-TRC's FM station began broadcasting in 2022.
