= WVHF =

WVHF could mean:

- 1140 WVHF (AM) Kentwood, Michigan — formerly WJNZ from 2003 to 2010
- 92.7 WGIE Clarksburg, West Virginia — was WVHF-FM until 2001
