= WCDV =

WCDV may refer to:

- WCDV-FM, a radio station (90.1 FM) licensed to serve Trout Run, Pennsylvania, United States
- WCDV-LP, a low-power radio station (89.3 FM) licensed to serve Lynn, Massachusetts, United States; see List of radio stations in Massachusetts
- WCIN, a radio station (88.3 FM) licensed to serve Bath, New York, United States, which held the call sign WCDV-FM in 2022
- WRQQ, a radio station (103.3 FM) licensed to serve Hammond, Louisiana, United States, which held the call sign WCDV from 2005 to 2012
- WKZS, a radio station (103.3 FM) licensed to serve Thomasboro, Illinois, United States, which held the call sign WCDV from 1985 to 1998
