= WNMP =

WNMP may refer to:

- WCGO, an American radio station broadcasting with the call sign WNMP until 1970
- WNMP (FM), a radio station (88.5 FM) licensed to serve Marlinton, West Virginia, United States
