= WLHC =

- Robbins, North Carolina; United States
- Broadcast area: Sanford, Asheboro, Raleigh Metro Area
- Frequency: 103.1 MHz
- Branding: Life 103.1

Programming
- Format: Adult Standards/MOR

Ownership
- Owner: Woolstone Corporation
- Sister stations: WLQC

History
- First air date: 2003
- Call sign meaning: Life in the Heart of Carolina

Technical information
- Licensing authority: FCC
- Facility ID: 85995
- Class: A
- ERP: 6,000 watts
- HAAT: 100 meters
- Transmitter coordinates: 35°26′33.00″N 79°26′37.00″W
- Repeaters: 103.1 FM (WLQC, Sharpsburg)

Links
- Public license information: Public file; LMS
- Webcast: Listen Live
- Website: life1031.com

WLHC (103.1 FM) is a radio station broadcasting an Adult Standards/MOR format. Licensed to Robbins, North Carolina, United States. The station is currently owned by Woolstone Corporation.

In addition, WLHC also broadcasts two locally produced bluegrass shows (The Hometown Festival and Bluegrass Saturday Night,) a syndicated bluegrass show (Into the Blue) and a syndicated Americana show (The Folksampler.) Sunday morning, listeners will hear inspirational music from 6 a.m. to 12 p.m.

In the past, it has featured programming from Citadel's Timeless radio network until it ceased operations in February 2010. As of right now, the Oldies/Standards format is provided locally.

WLHC Life 103.1 won the 2013 Radio Station of the Year Award (Non-Metro) by the North Carolina Association of Broadcasters at their meeting in Greensboro in June 2013. President Alan Button gave high praise to his employees for a job well done, including Steve Koranda, who died from cancer in July 2012. "The Koranda Standard" is a phrase used at the station to honor Steve's work quality and integrity.

== Signal Coverage ==
WLHC's signal primarily covers the Sandhills region of North Carolina, mainly Lee, Moore, Chatham, Randolph, Montgomery, Richmond, Hoke, and Harnett Counties. WLHC also reaches the western portions of Wake and Cumberland counties (including Fort Bragg), albeit at a lower-grade signal. WLHC also has a presence on the internet, streaming its signal live via Microsoft Silverlight.
