= XEP-AM =

Radio station in Ciudad Juárez, Chihuahua

- Ciudad Juárez, Chihuahua; Mexico
- Frequency: 1300 AM
- Branding: Radio Mexicana Nuestras Noticias

Programming
- Format: Regional Mexican, News/talk

Ownership
- Owner: Grupo Radiorama; (Fantástico Radio Trece, S.A.)

History
- First air date: 1936

Technical information
- Licensing authority: CRT
- Class: B
- Power: 38,000 watts days 200 watts nights

Links
- Webcast: Listen live
- Website: radiorama.mx

XEP-AM is a talk radio station in Ciudad Juárez, Chihuahua, Mexico. Broadcasting on 1300 AM, XEP is known as Radio Mexicana Nuestras Noticias and is owned by Grupo Radiorama.

== History ==
Logo as "Radio 13"

XEP's concession history begins in 1936 with the award of XEP, originally on 1160 kHz, to Esteban Parra. The station was sold to its current concessionaire in the 1980s. For a time in the 2000s and 2010s, it was run by Grupo Radio México.

Despite the similar name of the station and its format, Radio 13 in Juárez was never related to Radio Trece XEDA-AM in Mexico City, which was owned by Radio S.A.
