= XHFQ-FM =

IMER radio station in Cananea, Sonora

- Cananea, Sonora; Mexico
- Frequency: 103.1 FM (HD Radio)
- Branding: La FQ

Programming
- Format: Public radio

Ownership
- Owner: Instituto Mexicano de la Radio

History
- First air date: 1937
- Former frequencies: 980 kHz (until 2013)

Technical information
- Licensing authority: CRT
- Class: B
- ERP: 10 kWs
- HAAT: 94.3 m (309 ft)
- Transmitter coordinates: 30°59′04″N 110°17′36″W

Links
- Webcast: XHFQ-FM
- Website: http://www.imer.mx/lafq/

XHFQ-FM is a Mexican radio station in Cananea, Sonora. Broadcasting on 103.1 FM, XHFQ is owned by the Instituto Mexicano de la Radio and broadcasts a varied music format under the name "La FQ".

XHFQ-FM broadcasts in HD.

== History ==
XHFQ began on AM as XEFQ-AM on 980 kHz. The first transmissions were made using homemade equipment in 1937, and on April 20 of that year, the Secretariat of Communications and Public Works awarded a concession to Pedro López Díaz for a 500-watt AM radio station.

In 1985, the Cananea Mining Company, then a state-owned enterprise, reached a deal with IMER, handing over operations of XEFQ to the institute. That year, the station suffered two explosive attacks, the cause of which was never determined.

On March 25, 1988, IMER contracted with Nafinsa to buy XEFQ and the subsidiary that owned it, Voz e Imagen de Cananea, outright. IMER covers the 347.3 million peso cost with advertising sales to Nafinsa. This came at the same time that Cananea Mining Company was to be privatized, which caused the Secretary of Mines and State-owned Industries to propose and approve the transfer. However, legal confusion dogged the station. López Díaz remained the concessionaire in SCT records for years, even though he died in 1990. Even worse, during an August 1989 miner's strike, the Mexican Army seized XEFQ for several days. On top of the legal and political situation, the station's facilities were deteriorating. IMER solved that problem by putting into place a new, 2.5 kW transmitter, but IMER had trouble getting the SCT to approve the power increase from 1 kW.

Logo before moving to 103.1

In 2001, IMER built a new building to house XEFQ's administrative offices.

In September 2013, XEFQ migrated from AM to FM on 103.1 MHz, changing callsigns to XHFQ-FM.
