= XHQTO-FM =

Radio station in Querétaro, Querétaro, Mexico

- Querétaro, Querétaro; Mexico
- Frequency: 97.9 MHz
- Branding: Match FM

Programming
- Format: Hot adult contemporary

Ownership
- Owner: Grupo ACIR; (Radio XHQTO Querétaro, S. de R. L. de C. V.)

History
- First air date: November 1994 (concession)
- Call sign meaning: Querétaro

Technical information
- Class: C1
- ERP: 100 kW
- HAAT: 78.50 meters (257.5 ft)
- Transmitter coordinates: 20°36′20.8″N 100°22′08.5″W

Links
- Webcast: XHQTO-FM
- Website: matchmx.fm

XHQTO-FM is a radio station on 97.9 FM in Querétaro. The station is owned by Grupo ACIR and airs the company's Match format of hot adult contemporary in English.

== History ==
The station's concession was awarded in November 1994 to Aurora Ricco Pérez. The concession was sold to ACIR in 1998. Azul 97 (1994-2000'S) MIX FM (2000'S-2013) Radio Felicidad (2013–2017) After carrying its Radio Felicidad oldies format, Amor moved from XHJHS-FM 101.1 to XHQTO in August 2017. This lasted until the end of September 2022, when ACIR dropped the format in Querétaro.

On November 28 it was officially launched as Match FM.
