= KPAS =

Radio station in Fabens, Texas

- Fabens, Texas; United States
- Frequency: 103.1 MHz
- Branding: Inspirational Gospel Radio

Programming
- Format: Christian radio

Ownership
- Owner: Algie A. Felder

History
- First air date: 1979
- Last air date: June 2023
- Former call signs: KLMF-FM (1979–1982)

Technical information
- Licensing authority: FCC
- Facility ID: 976
- Class: A
- ERP: 3,000 watts
- HAAT: 91 meters (299 ft)
- Transmitter coordinates: 31°35′42.4″N 106°11′59.9″W

Links
- Public license information: Public file; LMS

KPAS (103.1 FM) was a radio station broadcasting a Christian radio music format. Licensed to Fabens, Texas, United States. The station was last owned by Algie A. Felder. It went on the air in 1979 as KLMF-FM, became KPAS in 1982, and ceased operations after losing its transmitter in a 2023 lightning strike.

== History ==
The station was assigned the call letters KLMF-FM on July 30, 1979. On July 7, 1982, the station changed its call sign to KPAS.

KPAS went silent in June 2023, after the station's transmitter was destroyed by a lightning strike. It never returned to the air; the Federal Communications Commission (FCC) canceled its license in November 2024.

== History of call letters ==
The call letters KPAS previously belonged to an AM station in Banning, California, which began broadcasting November 9, 1949.

In September 1953, the FCC authorized assignment of the license of KPAS of Banning, California, from Byron-Wood Motors to Henry Chester Darwin, for $6,100.
