= WXDB-LP =

- Charleston, West Virginia; United States
- Broadcast area: Metro Charleston
- Frequency: 95.7 MHz

Ownership
- Owner: Roots Town Radio, Inc.

History
- First air date: September 6, 2014
- Last air date: October 20, 2014

Technical information
- Facility ID: 192983
- Class: L1
- ERP: 17 watts
- HAAT: 72 meters (236 ft)
- Transmitter coordinates: 38°22′34.0″N 81°39′24.0″W

WXDB-LP (95.7 FM) was an Americana and Adult Album Alternative music formatted broadcast radio station licensed to Charleston, West Virginia and served Metro Charleston. WXDB-LP was owned and operated by Roots Town Radio, Inc.

== History ==
The station's short history began on February 18, 2014 when Roots Town Radio, Inc. filed the initial paperwork for a Low-Power FM radio station. The station was part of the Federal Communications Commission "LPFM filing window" in October 2013.

On February 21, Roots Town Radio began raising funds to construct the station through crowdfunding website Indiegogo. The company also received a $9,000 grant from the Greater Kanawha Valley Foundation.

The call sign WXDB-LP was issued for the station on February 25, 2014. WXDB-LP was originally to begin broadcasting on August 25, but instead launched on September 6, 2014.

On October 20, 2014, WXDB-LP fell silent as owner Roots Town Radio, Inc. requested the station's construction permit and call sign be cancelled. A message on the station's website stated the station was "off the air for good" and thanked the public for their support.

Dysfunction within the station's leadership led to the station's demise. Roots Town Radio President Dawn Warner and Vice President/Station Manager Burr Beard wrestled for control of the station in the weeks leading up to the station falling silent. On-Air volunteers called the station a "toxic environment".

Former volunteer DJs of WXDB-LP have agreed to join another Low-Power FM station once it launches.
