= WCIS (AM) =

- Morganton, North Carolina; United States
- Frequency: 760 kHz

Programming
- Format: Southern gospel music

Ownership
- Owner: WFM Incorporated

History
- First air date: March 1988
- Call sign meaning: "Western Carolina Inspiration Station"

Technical information
- Licensing authority: FCC
- Facility ID: 70623
- Class: D
- Power: 3,500 watts daytime only
- Transmitter coordinates: 35°47′40″N 81°43′12″W

Links
- Public license information: Public file; LMS
- Webcast: Listen live
- Website: www.wcisradio.com

WCIS (760 kHz) is an AM radio station broadcasting a southern gospel music format. Licensed to Morganton, North Carolina, United States, it serves the Morganton area. The station is owned by WFM Incorporated.

== History ==
In December 1985, the Federal Communications Commission (FCC) granted a license to American Beacon Broadcasting, majority owned by Ernie Penley, Jr., station manager of WPTL in Canton, North Carolina. Sherrill Greene of Glen Alpine was the other owner. The plan was to play contemporary Christian music by such artists as Amy Grant and Sandi Patti, with a target audience of 25 to 45.

WCIS did not sign on until March 1988, and the format changed to southern gospel in January 1989. Many listeners were over 50.

On February 1, 2008, the station's building was destroyed by fire. John Whisnant, Jr., who had won the Southern Gospel DJ of the Year award three times, said he believed the fire was intentionally set to cover up a burglary. WCIS returned to the air on March 1 with automation and a backup transmitter, with plans to begin live broadcasts eventually. A new studio was planned on Highway 126. WMIT sent its chief engineer to get the station running again, and station employees were helping with construction of the new studio.
