= WQAB =

Radio station in Philippi, West Virginia (1975–2019)

Coordinates: 39.165°N 80.049°W

Philippi, West Virginia; United States
- Broadcast area: Philippi, West Virginia; Grafton, West Virginia
- Frequency: 91.3 MHz

Programming
- Format: Defunct (formerly public radio)

Ownership
- Owner: West Virginia Educational Broadcasting Authority

History
- First air date: 1975
- Last air date: June 4, 2019
- Call sign meaning: Alderson-Broaddus

Technical information
- Licensing authority: FCC
- Class: B1
- ERP: 7,200 watts
- HAAT: 55 meters (180 ft)

Links
- Public license information: Public file; LMS

WQAB was a Public Radio-formatted broadcast radio station licensed to Philippi, West Virginia, serving the Philippi/Grafton area.

WQAB signed on in 1975 as the student radio station of Alderson-Broaddus College; in its last incarnation it had an adult contemporary format. West Virginia Public Broadcasting purchased WQAB from the college for $30,000 in February 2017 and converted it to a repeater of its statewide network.

WQAB's license was surrendered to the Federal Communications Commission (FCC) and cancelled on June 4, 2019.
