= XHUAT-FM =

Radio station in Santa María Huatulco, Oaxaca

Santa María Huatulco, Oaxaca; Mexico
- Frequency: 103.1 FM
- Branding: Estéreo Huatulco

Programming
- Format: Full-service

Ownership
- Owner: Grupo Oro Esmeralda; (Casio Carlos Enrique Narváez y Lidolf)

History
- First air date: April 1, 1992 (concession)
- Call sign meaning: "Huatulco"

Technical information
- ERP: 2.9 kW

Links
- Website: Estéreo Huatulco

XHUAT-FM is a radio station on 103.1 FM in Santa María Huatulco, Oaxaca. It is owned by Grupo Oro Esmeralda and carries a full-service format.

== History ==
XHUAT received its concession on April 1, 1992. The concessionaire is a broadcast lawyer associated most closely with Radiorama.
