= WDUQ =

WDUQ may refer to:

- WDUQ-LP, a radio station (94.1 FM) licensed to Benwood, West Virginia, United States.
- WESA (FM), a radio station (90.5 FM) licensed to Pittsburgh, Pennsylvania, United States, which held the call sign WDUQ from December 1949 to September 2011.
