= WKVA =

Coordinates: 40°34′45″N 77°34′18″W

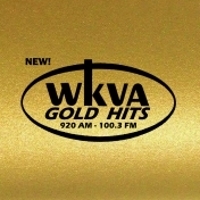
- Lewistown, Pennsylvania; United States
- Broadcast area: Mifflin County
- Frequency: 920 kHz
- Branding: Gold Hits WKVA

Programming
- Format: Gold-based Soft AC
- Affiliations: Premiere Networks; Westwood One

Ownership
- Owner: WVNW, Inc.

History
- First air date: December 4, 1949; 76 years ago

Technical information
- Licensing authority: FCC
- Facility ID: 9948
- Class: B
- Power: 1,000 watts day 500 watts night
- Translator: 100.3 W262DO (Lewistown)

Links
- Public license information: Public file; LMS
- Webcast: Listen Live
- Website: goldhitswkva.com

WKVA (920 AM) is a commercial radio station in Lewistown, Pennsylvania, serving Mifflin County. The station is owned by WVNW, Inc. It airs a gold-based soft adult contemporary radio format. Nationally syndicated radio shows heard weekdays on WKVA include Bob and Sheri in morning drive time and the call-in and request show Delilah each evening. Weekend syndicated shows include classic American Top 40 with Casey Kasem. The studios are on North Logan Boulevard in Burnham.

By day, WKVA is powered at 1,000 watts non-directional. But to protect other stations on 920 AM from interference, it reduces power at night to 500 watts and uses a directional antenna. Programming is also heard on 250-watt FM translator W262DO at 100.3 MHz.

== History ==
=== Early years ===
WKVA signed on the air on December 4, 1949. It was powered at 1,000 watts but was a daytimer. It broadcast during daylight hours only, from an omni-directional tower at its transmitter site south of Juniata Terrace. In the early 1960s, WKVA applied for, and was granted, nighttime authority with a directional pattern at 500 watts and consequently constructed two additional towers to accommodate the change.

Under the leadership of Robert Wilson, WKVA was home to a middle of the road (MOR) format for much of its history, with local news and sports. Announcers such as Fran Fisher, and Kerby Confer, 'cut their teeth' in the radio business at the controls of WKVA. The station later switched to country music.

=== Country, Oldies, Soft AC ===
By the early 1990s, Wilson could no longer compete with FM country stations in the area, as music programming gradually left the AM dial. He eventually sold the station to the owners of a new competing FM country station, WVNW, Harry and Anna Hain. The Hain Family had FM stations WVNW and WCHX in their portfolio of broadcast properties, and WKVA made a logical addition. WKVA then shifted to an oldies sound, adding Motorola's C-QUAM AM stereo system in the mid 90s.

On October 15, 2018, WKVA largely removed 1960s titles from its playlist, making the transition from oldies to classic hits. It was branded as "Big 100.3" (now simulcast on FM translator W262DO 100.3 FM Lewistown).

On January 1, 2020, WKVA ended its classic hits format. It switched to gold-based soft adult contemporary, branded as "Gold Hits WKVA 920 AM and 100.3 FM".
