= XHWQ-FM =

Radio station in Monclova, Coahuila, Mexico

Monclova, Coahuila; Mexico
- Frequency: 103.1 FM
- Branding: La Súper Estación

Programming
- Format: Full-service, grupera

Ownership
- Owner: Radio Triunfadora de Coahuila, S.A. de C.V.

History
- First air date: August 6, 1958 (concession)

Technical information
- ERP: 25 kW
- Transmitter coordinates: 26°55′04.6″N 101°24′33.39″W

Links
- Website: xhwq1031fm.radio12345.com

XHWQ-FM is a radio station on 103.1 FM in Monclova, Coahuila, Mexico. It is known as La Súper Estación.

== History ==
XEWQ-AM 1330 received its concession on August 6, 1958. It was owned by José Boone Menchaca and broadcast for many years with 1,000 watts day and 250 watts night. In the 1990s, it raised its daytime power to 4,000 watts. In October 2011, XEWQ was cleared for AM-FM migration.
