= Home Talk USA (radio) =

- Genre: Home improvement Radio Show
- Running time: 3 Hours
- Country of origin: United States
- Language: English
- Hosted by: Michael King "The Cajun Contractor"
- Website: Home Talk USA
- Podcast: Podcast

Home Talk USA is a weekly, nationally syndicated, home improvement, self-help education, information, and consumer protection radio program. The program is hosted by a licensed general contractor, Michael King "the Cajun Contractor". Home Talk USA is broadcast by 150 radio affiliates in all 50 states.

== Format ==
Home Talk USA is a Q&A format show. Each week there is a different home industry expert from the manufacturer, inventor, or distributor for a company that discusses all the issues and products for the home for about 2 minutes and then there is a 5 minute commercial.

== Host ==
"The Cajun Contractor" Michael King is the host and co-creator of Home Talk USA. He is a licensed contractor in the New Orleans, Louisiana area. His signature opening is "Yaahee! I am the originator not the duplicator. Please do not accept no substitutions. I was green before green was even cool". King is considered as the most recognizable name in all of Home Improvement Radio, according to DAR.FM.

== Audience demographics ==
The audience of Home Talk USA is 63.5% female and 36.5% male, ranging from average Do-it-Yourselfers to professional contractors, and handymen. 94% of Home Talk USA listeners are homeowners and the average listener has an income of $50,000 and up, and is between 28 and 55 years old. Home Talk USA reaches an estimated 5.1 million listeners per week with the majority of listeners coming from radio and podcasts.

== Availability ==
Home Talk USA is broadcast in at least one radio station in each of the 50 states, and in 47 countries around the globe. It is syndicated to radio stations around the United states through Business Talk Radio Network, Lifestyle Talk Radio Network, Genesis Communications Network, and Americas Talk Radio Network. Home Talk USA, through the Genesis Communications Network, is distributed on more than 1000 radio stations nationwide. The Podcast is also available on demand at the Home Talk USA website.

== Book ==
King co-wrote the book I Will Not Get Taken By a Home Improvement Contractor, with Home Talk Executive Producer Michael-St-Anthony Melancon, published in 2007 by Judy G. Publishing. The book is a guide to hiring a contractor for home improvement or new construction projects.

== Websites ==
The main website www.hometalkusa.com is an extension of the show and serves as an informational content website. This website offers home improvement tips, advice, and the ability to listen to Home Talk USA "On Demand" as a podcast. It also has information about future guests and topics of the show.

The website www.thehandycity.com is an e-commerce home hardware store for Home Talk USA.
