= WLQC =

Simulcasting WLHC Robbins
- Sharpsburg, North Carolina; United States
- Broadcast area: Raleigh Metro Area, Rocky Mount & Surrounding Area
- Frequency: 103.1 MHz
- Branding: Life 103.1

Programming
- Format: Adult Standards/MOR

Ownership
- Owner: (Pinestone Media Corporation)
- Sister stations: WLHC

History
- First air date: 2010

Technical information
- Licensing authority: FCC
- Facility ID: 170946
- Class: A
- ERP: 4,400 watts
- HAAT: 117 meters
- Transmitter coordinates: 35°58′40″N 77°57′0″W

Links
- Public license information: Public file; LMS
- Webcast: Listen Live
- Website: life1031fm.com

WLQC (103.1 FM) is a radio station broadcasting an adult standards/MOR format, licensed to Sharpsburg, North Carolina. It airs the same programming as WLHC, Robbins, North Carolina.
