= XHLCM-FM =

Radio station in Lázaro Cárdenas, Michoacán

- Lázaro Cárdenas, Michoacán; Mexico
- Frequency: 95.7 FM
- Branding: La Poderosa

Programming
- Format: Regional Mexican

Ownership
- Owner: Grupo Radiorama; (XELCM-AM, S.A. de C.V.)
- Operator: Grupo AS Comunicación
- Sister stations: XHCCBD-FM

History
- First air date: February 24, 1993 (concession)
- Call sign meaning: Lázaro Cárdenas Michoacán

Technical information
- ERP: 25 kW
- Transmitter coordinates: 18°00′11″N 102°14′38″W

Links
- Webcast: XHLCM

XHLCM-FM is a radio station on 95.7 FM located in Lázaro Cárdenas, Michoacán. It is owned by Grupo Radiorama and carries the La Poderosa Regional Mexican format.

== History ==
XELCM-AM on 920 AM received its concession on February 24, 1993. It has always been owned by Radiorama since it was launched. In 2010, it was disbanded and merged with XHLCM-FM.
