= ZPV1 =

Paraguayan radio station

Radio Nacional del Paraguay (ZPV1)
Asunción; Paraguay
- Broadcast area: Asunción capital region
- Frequency: 95.1 MHz

Programming
- Languages: Spanish, Guarani
- Format: Public radio

Ownership
- Owner: Government of Paraguay; (Estado Paraguayo)
- Sister stations: ZP1

History
- Call sign meaning: Sequentially issued

Technical information
- Licensing authority: CONATEL
- ERP: 100,000 watts

Links
- Webcast: ZPV1 live stream

ZPV1 is the FM station of Paraguay's state broadcaster, Radio Nacional del Paraguay. It transmits on 95.1 MHz with an effective radiated power of 100,000 watts. It is the sister station to AM station ZP1, but airs different programming. ZPV1 airs a public radio format in the Spanish & Guarani languages.
