= XHJTF-FM =

Radio station in Zacoalco de Torres, Jalisco

- La Cruz, Zacoalco de Torres, Jalisco; Mexico
- Frequency: 103.1 FM
- Branding: La Tremenda

Programming
- Format: Grupera

Ownership
- Owner: Grupo Radiofónico ZER; (Rodrigo Rodríguez Reyes)

History
- First air date: October 22, 1970 (concession)
- Call sign meaning: José Toscano Figueroa

Technical information
- Licensing authority: CRT
- Class: A
- ERP: 3 kW
- HAAT: −198.61 m (−651.6 ft)
- Transmitter coordinates: 20°14′55.03″N 103°35′29.61″W

Links
- Website: grupozer.net/radios.php?estacion=22

XHJTF-FM is a radio station on 103.1 FM in Zacoalco de Torres, Jalisco. It is owned by Grupo Radiofónico ZER and carries its La Tremenda grupera format.

== History ==
XEJTF-AM 1450 received its concession on October 22, 1970. The 250-watt station was owned by and named for José Toscano Figueroa. Toscano Figueroa went on to become the municipal president of Zacoalco de Torres from 1974 to 1976.

The station ramped up its power to 500 watts sometime in the 1970s or early 1980s before moving to 1170 kHz and 1 kW power in the 1990s. In 2006, Toscano Figueroa sold the station to Nancy Hoyos Salgado. In 2014, ZER acquired the station in the person of vice president Rodrigo Rodríguez Reyes.

XEJTF was authorized for AM-FM migration in 2012.
