= KYKV =

K-Love radio station in Selah–Yakima, Washington

- Selah, Washington; United States
- Broadcast area: Yakima, Washington
- Frequency: 103.1 MHz (HD Radio)
- Branding: K-Love

Programming
- Format: Contemporary Christian
- Subchannels: HD2: Air1; HD3: Radio Nueva Vida
- Affiliations: K-Love

Ownership
- Owner: Educational Media Foundation

History
- First air date: 1983 (as KQBE)
- Former call signs: KQBE (1983–2008)

Technical information
- Licensing authority: FCC
- Facility ID: 52035
- Class: C2
- ERP: 5,400 watts
- HAAT: 435 meters
- Transmitter coordinates: 46°38′27.00″N 120°23′46.00″W

Links
- Public license information: Public file; LMS
- Webcast: Listen Live
- Website: klove.com

KYKV (103.1 FM) is a radio station broadcasting a Contemporary Christian format. Licensed to Selah, Washington, United States, the station serves Yakima and Kittitas Counties from a transmitter northeast of Terrace Heights. The station is currently owned by Educational Media Foundation. Prior to the K-LOVE format, it aired Top 40 music and targeted Ellensburg listeners as KQBE.
