= KLAR =

Coordinates: 27°31′46″N 99°31′16″W

- Laredo, Texas; United States
- Broadcast area: Laredo, Texas; Nuevo Laredo, Tamaulipas
- Frequency: 1300 kHz
- Branding: Radio Poder

Programming
- Format: Spanish Christian

Ownership
- Owner: Faith and Power Communications, Inc.

History
- Former call signs: KGNS (1961–1969)
- Call sign meaning: K LARedo

Technical information
- Licensing authority: FCC
- Class: D
- Power: 1,000 watts (day); 80 watts (night)
- Translator: K226CZ (93.1 MHz) Laredo (CP)

Links
- Public license information: Public file; LMS
- Website: www.radiopoder1300.com

KLAR (1300 AM, "Radio Poder") is a radio station that serves the Laredo, Texas, United States and Nuevo Laredo, Tamaulipas, Mexico border area. It broadcasts a Spanish-language religious format.

== History ==
1300 AM received its FCC license on September 7, 1961, as KGNS. KGNS was owned by the Southwestern Operating Company and broadcast during the day only with 500 watts; it took its call sign from KGNS-TV channel 8, which had adopted it several years earlier. In 1964, KGNS powered up to 1,000 watts, and in 1967, it began nighttime broadcasts. The station was sold twice in the early 1970s, not long after changing its call letters to KLAR. For most of the 1970s, KLAR was an English language Top 40 station.

In June 1995, Crystal Media Inc. sold KLAR to Faith and Power Communications Inc., a Laredo-based non-profit organization headed by pastor Héctor Manuel Patiño.
