= ZP1 (AM) =

Paraguayan radio station

Radio Nacional del Paraguay (ZP1)
Asunción; Paraguay
- Broadcast area: Capital area
- Frequency: 920 kHz

Programming
- Languages: Spanish, Guarani
- Format: Public radio

Ownership
- Owner: Government of Paraguay; (ESTADO PARAGUAYO)
- Sister stations: ZPV1

History
- Call sign meaning: Sequentially issued

Technical information
- Licensing authority: CONATEL
- Facility ID: 100415
- Class: A
- Power: 100,000 watts (day & night)
- Transmitter coordinates: 25°16′S 57°38′W

Links
- Webcast: ZP1 live stream
- Website: Radio Nacional del Paraguay official website

ZP1 is an AM radio station owned by Paraguay's state broadcaster, Radio Nacional del Paraguay. ZP1 transmits on 920 kHz with a transmitter power output of 100,000 watts. Airing a public radio format, programs are in Spanish and in the Guarani languages. It is owned with FM sister station ZPV1, but the stations air different programming.
