= XHMDR-FM =

Imagen Radio station in Tampico, Tamaulipas, Mexico

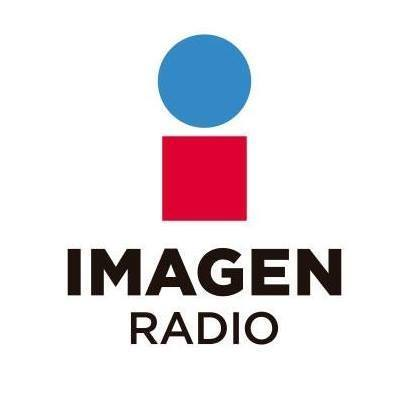
- Ciudad Madero, Tamaulipas; Mexico
- Broadcast area: Tampico
- Frequency: 103.1 MHz
- RDS: IMAGEN
- Branding: Imagen Radio

Programming
- Format: News/talk and English classic hits

Ownership
- Owner: Grupo Imagen; (GIM Televisión Nacional, S.A. de C.V.)

History
- First air date: October 2, 1990 (concession)
- Call sign meaning: Ciudad Madero

Technical information
- Licensing authority: CRT
- Class: B
- ERP: 50,000 watts
- HAAT: 52.7 m (173 ft)
- Transmitter coordinates: 22°16′10.0″N 97°52′27.6″W

Links
- Webcast: Listen live
- Website: imagentam.mx

XHMDR-FM is a radio station in Ciudad Madero, Tamaulipas, Mexico. It is an owned-and-operated station of Grupo Imagen and carries its Imagen Radio Spanish-language News/Talk and English classic hits programming.

== History ==
XHMDR received its concession on October 2, 1990. It was owned by Enrique Regules Uriegas for Multimedios Radio. XHMDR's first format was "Estéreo Recuerdo", which broadcast contemporary music in Spanish and later became "Stereo Hits", a pop format in Spanish. Imagen acquired XHMDR in 2006 and changed to news/talk programming.
