= XHJHS-FM =

Radio station in Querétaro

- Querétaro, Querétaro; Mexico
- Frequency: 101.1 FM
- Branding: Stereo Cristal

Programming
- Format: Spanish adult hits

Ownership
- Owner: Corporación Bajío Comunicaciones; (Radio XHJHS, S.A. de C.V.)
- Sister stations: XHQRO-FM

History
- First air date: May 26, 1988 (concession)
- Call sign meaning: José Horacio Septién

Technical information
- Class: B
- ERP: 46.9 kW
- HAAT: 45.83 meters (150.4 ft)
- Transmitter coordinates: 20°36′22.3″N 100°22′08.3″W

Links
- Website: www.stereocristal.mx

XHJHS-FM is a radio station on 101.1 FM in Querétaro, Querétaro, known as Stereo Cristal, carrying a Spanish adult oldies format.

== History ==
XHJHS received its concession on January 14, 1988. The original concessionaire was José Horacio Septién under the name Radio XHJHS, S.A. de C.V. The station was operated by ACIR for most of its history and was known as "Stereo Cristal" with a romantic format. In 1996, the station changed to Regional Mexican music as "Bonita 101.1". The format lasted until 2003, when XHJHS took on Grupo ACIR's Amor romantic format.

In 2017, Amor was moved to another ACIR station XHQTO-FM 97.9, and XHJHS was relaunched as Stereo Cristal under the control of Corporación Bajío Comunicaciones as its second Querétaro-market station after XHQRO-FM.

Horacio Septién had also obtained the concessions for XEFL-XHFL in León, Guanajuato and for a station in Ciudad del Carmen, Campeche, which was never built.
