= WFEC-LP =

- Winston-Salem, North Carolina; United States
- Frequency: 103.1 MHz

Programming
- Format: Spanish Religious

Ownership
- Owner: Iglesia Bautista El Camino

History
- First air date: 2004

Technical information
- Licensing authority: FCC
- Class: L1
- ERP: 100 watts
- HAAT: 14.4 meters (47 feet)
- Transmitter coordinates: 36°10′27″N 80°17′40″W

Links
- Public license information: LMS

WFEC-LP (103.1 FM) is a radio station licensed to Winston-Salem, North Carolina, United States, it serves the Piedmont Triad area. The station is currently owned by Iglesia Bautista El Camino. It airs a Spanish language Religious radio format.

The station was assigned the WFEC-LP call letters by the Federal Communications Commission on April 8, 2004.
