= KPAI-LP =

- Paisley, Oregon; United States
- Frequency: 103.1 MHz

Ownership
- Owner: Paisley High School

Technical information
- Licensing authority: FCC
- Facility ID: 133953
- Class: L1
- ERP: 80 watts
- HAAT: −78.4 meters (−257 ft)
- Transmitter coordinates: 42°41′39″N 120°32′23″W

Links
- Public license information: LMS

KPAI-LP (103.1 FM) is a low-power radio station licensed to Paisley, Oregon, United States. The station is currently owned by Paisley High School.
