= Allegheny Mountain Radio =

- United States
- Broadcast area: Virginia (limited); West Virginia (limited)
- Frequency: see § Stations
- Branding: Allegheny Mountain Radio

Programming
- Format: Full-service and free-form
- Affiliations: NPR; PRX; Virginia News Network; West Virginia MetroNews

Ownership
- Owner: Pocahontas Communications Cooperative Corporation

History
- First air date: June 1981

Links
- Webcast: Listen live
- Website: alleghenymountainradio.org

Allegheny Mountain Radio or AMR is a network of full-service, free-form-formatted community radio stations broadcasting to portions of West Virginia and Virginia in the United States. The stations serve Pocahontas County, West Virginia as well as Bath County, Virginia and Highland County, Virginia.

This network is unique in that these are the only radio stations broadcasting from the three counties. The area sits within the National Radio Quiet Zone (NRQZ), which surrounds the Green Bank Radio Telescope in Green Bank, West Virginia. Due to the NRQZ and surrounding mountainous terrain, few out-of-area radio signals penetrate these counties.

All stations in the network are owned and operated by Pocahontas Communications Cooperative Corporation.

== History ==
Pocahontas Communications Cooperative Corporation was formed in April 1979 as a non-profit organization to operate the community radio stations for educational and charitable purposes. Financial support for AMR comes from individual donations, underwriting from businesses and grants. As of 2025, approximately 2/3 of its funding comes from the Corporation for Public Broadcasting.

Radio transmission operations began in June 1981. WVMR 1370 is the only radio station operating within the inner core of the Radio Quiet Zone. WVMR is also the only AM station in the Pocahontas Communications Cooperative Corporation network.

In a span of three years, AMR's other stations went on the air. In May 1995, the Monterey, Virginia-based WVLS launched, followed by WCHG from Hot Springs, Virginia in June 1995, and the translator FM station W278AL from Durbin, West Virginia in July 1998.

During a "filing window" for applications for non-commercial educational FM stations, in 2007 and 2008, the Pocahontas Communications Cooperative Corporation applied for construction permits for stations in Marlinton, Hillsboro, and Franklin, West Virginia. WVMR-FM was constructed and began test transmissions on October 6, 2010, with full operation beginning on October 26, 2010. WNMP was constructed and began test transmissions on September 27, 2011, with full operation beginning on September 30, 2011. Due to a lack of funding, and a lack of interest on the part of public that was to be served, WVPC was not constructed. Its construction permit was allowed to expire on December 18, 2010.

== Stations ==
| Call sign | Frequency | City of license | FID | Power (W) | ERP (W) | HAAT | Class | Transmitter coordinates | FCC info |
|---|---|---|---|---|---|---|---|---|---|
| WVMR | 1370 AM | Frost, WV | 52867 | 5,000 (days only) | — | — | D | 38°17′25.0″N 79°55′52.0″W | Public file; LMS |
| WVLS | 89.7 FM | Monterey, VA | 52866 | — | 360 | 445 m (1,460 ft) | B1 | 38°20′39.4″N 79°35′46.1″W | Public file; LMS |
| WCHG | 107.1 FM | Hot Springs, VA | 52868 | — | 160 | 429 m (1,407 ft) | A | 38°1′53.4″N 79°46′51.1″W | Public file; LMS |
| WVMR-FM | 91.9 FM | Hillsboro, WV | 122123 | — | 550 | −10.7 m (−35 ft) | A | 38°11′30.4″N 80°11′43.2″W | Public file; LMS |
| WNMP | 88.5 FM | Marlinton, WV | 175012 | — | 1,000 | −65.9 m (−216 ft) | A | 38°13′40.4″N 80°4′39.2″W | Public file; LMS |
| WDMT | 106.3 FM | Marlinton, WV | 191497 | — | 60 | 334 m (1,096 ft) | A | 38°14′5″N 80°9′20.2″W | Public file; LMS |

Broadcast translator for WVLS
| Call sign | Frequency | City of license | FID | ERP (W) | HAAT | Class | Transmitter coordinates | FCC info |
|---|---|---|---|---|---|---|---|---|
| W278AL | 103.5 FM | Durbin, WV | 85043 | 50 | −128 m (−420 ft) | D | 38°33′4.4″N 79°50′6.2″W | LMS |

'"`UNIQ--templatestyles-0000004C-QINU`"'
- Signal contours for Allegheny Mountain Radio
- '"`UNIQ--templatestyles-00000048-QINU`"''"`UNIQ--templatestyles-0000004B-QINU`"'
  - '"`UNIQ--templatestyles-00000049-QINU`"'
    Daytime groundwave 2 mV/m signal for WVMR
  - '"`UNIQ--templatestyles-0000004A-QINU`"'
    FM stations/translator grade A 60 dBu signals

== Music programming ==
Allegheny Mountain Radio (AMR) has no set format, unlike most other radio stations in the United States.

Music heard on the Allegheny Mountain Radio (AMR) stations varies from country music to rock music, and from contemporary hit radio to adult standards. News broadcasts are updated throughout the day from a team of AMR reporters. During the high-school football season, local football games are broadcast as well. Allegheny Mountain Radio also broadcasts informational programming such as the local "Book Talk", which comes from the McClintic Public Library in Marlinton, West Virginia.

In the late night hours, WVMR-FM, WCHG, WVLS, WNMP, WDMT, and W278AL simulcast classical music-formatted radio station WCPE.

== Air shifts ==
Most shifts are from one to two hours long, with the exception of the weekday morning and afternoon shows (Morning Drive and Traffic Jam) which run for, respectively, four and three hours.

The one- and two-hour shifts are hosted by volunteers who are on the air only on certain days, while some DJs broadcast Monday through Friday.

== Public service education projects ==
Pocahontas County Communications serves the public and uses the radio station as an expression of the public's needs. A recent project returned G.D. McNeil's "The Last Forest: Tales of the Allegheny Woods" back into print and created radio plays from several short stories within the collection. Currently, Allegheny Mountain Radio offers a free multi-disciplinary curriculum The Last Forest for students 6–10, but it is seeing use in college-level applications.

== See also ==
- List of community radio stations in the United States
