= Michael King (radio host) =

- Presenting career
- Show: Home Talk USA (radio)
- Network: Business Talk Radio Network Genesis Communications Network
- Country: United States
- Website: Home Talk USA

Michael King, nicknamed "The Cajun Contractor", is the host and co-creator of the American nationally syndicated weekly radio program Home Talk USA. Home Talk USA first aired in New Orleans, Louisiana on January 24, 2004. His show has 3.3 million listeners worldwide.

== Book ==
King co-wrote the book I Will Not Get Taken By a Home Improvement Contractor, with Home Talk Executive Producer Michael-St-Anthony Melancon, published in 2007 by Judy G. Publishing. The book is a guide to hiring a contractor for home improvement or new construction projects.
