= XHY-FM =

Radio station in Celaya, Guanajuato, Mexico

- Celaya, Guanajuato; Mexico
- Frequency: 96.7 (MHz)
- Branding: Stereo Cristal

Programming
- Format: Romántic

Ownership
- Owner: Grupo Radar; (XHEY, S.A. de C.V.)
- Sister stations: XHCEL-FM, XHRE-FM, XHQRO-FM

History
- First air date: July 28, 1952 (concession)

Technical information
- ERP: 6 kW
- Transmitter coordinates: 20°30′57″N 100°45′54″W

Links
- Webcast: Listen live
- Website: stereocristal.mx

XHY-FM is a radio station on 96.7 FM in Celaya, Guanajuato, Mexico. It is owned by Corporación Bajío Comunicaciones and known as Stereo Cristal with a Romantic format.

== History ==
XEY-AM received its concession on July 28, 1952. It was owned by Dolores Suárez de Zamarroni and broadcast on 1360 kHz. After being sold to XEY Radio Celaya, S.A., the station was bought and operated by Grupo ACIR and then Corporación Bajío Comunicaciones.

In 2011, XEY was authorized to migrate to FM.

In 2012, Radiorama bought XEY/XHY; however, the company did not get the concession in its name until 2015, and when it did, it transferred it to a concessionaire using the wrong calls. After five years, CBC took over operations of XHY again and instituted its Radio Lobo grupera format, similar to but not simulcast with XESAG-AM 1040.

In February 2024, XHY changed to Stereo Crystal after Radio Lobo moved to XHRE-FM/XERE-AM 88.1/920.
