= XHJTA-FM =

Radio station in Irapuato, Guanajuato, Mexico

- Irapuato, Guanajuato; Mexico
- Frequency: 94.3 MHz
- Branding: Radar

Programming
- Format: Spanish & English Pop (CHR)

Ownership
- Owner: Grupo ACIR; (Radio XHJTA, S. de R. L. de C. V. (pending sale to Corporación Bajío Comunicaciones))
- Operator: Corporación Bajío Comunicaciones
- Sister stations: XHITO-FM, XHXV-FM

History
- First air date: January 25, 1980 (concession)

Technical information
- Class: B1
- ERP: 25.08 kW

Links
- Webcast: Listen live

XHJTA-FM is a radio station on 94.3 FM in Irapuato, Guanajuato, Mexico. It is currently operated by Corporación Bajío Comunicaciones and carries a pop format known as Radar.

== History ==
XHJTA received its concession on October 14, 1976. It was originally owned by Armando Cardoña Muñoz.

In 2015, operation passed from Radio Integral to Radio XHJTA when ACIR opted to create 34 new limited liability holding companies for most of its stations.

ACIR left the group in Irapuato along with XHITO-FM on December 31, 2025. In February 2026, Corporación Bajío took over the station and adopted the Radar pop music brand based on XHQRO-FM 107.5 in Querétaro and XHXV-FM 88.9 in León.
