= KKCY =

- Colusa, California; United States
- Broadcast area: Yuba City-Marysville-Colusa-Oroville
- Frequency: 103.1 MHz (HD Radio)
- Branding: 103.1 KKCY

Programming
- Format: Country
- Subchannels: HD2: Oldies "95.5 YTO"
- Affiliations: Westwood One

Ownership
- Owner: Results Radio of Chico Licensee, LLC

History
- First air date: 1989
- Former call signs: KKLU (1989–1990)
- Former frequencies: 96.5 MHz (1989–1990)

Technical information
- Licensing authority: FCC
- Facility ID: 52507
- Class: A
- ERP: 135 watts
- HAAT: 599 meters (1,965 ft)
- Transmitter coordinates: 39°12′21″N 121°49′11″W
- Translator: HD2: 95.5 K238AV (Yuba City)

Links
- Public license information: Public file; LMS
- Website: www.kkcy.com; 955yto.com (HD2)

KKCY (103.1 FM) is a radio station broadcasting a country music format. Licensed to Colusa, California, United States, the station serves the Yuba City-Marysville area. The station is currently owned by Results Radio of Chico Licensee, LLC and features programming from Westwood One . The KKCY morning team of Dave & Briggs has anchored the station since 2003.

== History ==
The station went on the air as KKLU at 96.5 MHz on 1989-06-05, from its co-located studio and transmitter site in downtown Colusa. In January 1990, KKLU changed frequency to 103.1 and later that year, significantly increased coverage (now heard from Chico to Sacramento), when it began transmitting from the Sutter Buttes. On 1990-09-08, the station changed its call sign to the current KKCY.

Previous logo

== KKCY-HD2 ==
KKCY’s sister station 95.5 YTO broadcasts on the KKCY HD2 subchannel and is rebroadcast on translator K238AV at 95.5 FM.

On November 4, 2024, KKCY-HD2 changed their format from top 40/CHR to oldies, branded as "95.5 YTO".
