= XHCEL-FM =

Radio station in Celaya, Guanajuato, Mexico

- Praderas de la Soledad/Celaya, Guanajuato; Mexico
- Broadcast area: Celaya
- Frequency: 103.7 FM
- Branding: El y Ella

Programming
- Format: Pop

Ownership
- Owner: Corporación Bajío Comunicaciones; (Radio XECEL, S.A. de C.V.)
- Sister stations: XHRE-FM, XHY-FM, XHQRO-FM

History
- First air date: March 13, 1987 (concession)
- Call sign meaning: CELaya

Technical information
- ERP: 6 kW
- Transmitter coordinates: 20°30′12.1″N 100°55′21.9″W

Links
- Webcast: Listen live
- Website: elyella.mx

XHCEL-FM is a radio station on 103.7 FM in Celaya, Guanajuato, Mexico. XHCEL is owned by Corporación Bajío Comunicaciones and carries a pop format known as El y Ella.

== History ==
30th anniversary logo

XECEL-AM received its concession on March 13, 1987, broadcasting with 100 watts on 950 kHz. It launched that year with the Radio Fiesta name. XECEL was owned by Enrique Bernal y Servín, who had the year before built the first FM station in Celaya, XHCGT-FM 107.5 (now XHQRO-FM). XECEL was approved to migrate to FM in 2011.

The El y Ella format has bounced around several stations that were at one point or another part of CBC. It was originally on XHCGT until what was then known as Corporación Celaya Comunicaciones opted to move all of XHCGT except its transmitter to Santiago de Querétaro. It was also on XHY-FM 96.7 until CBC leased its operation to Radiorama.
