= WBKE-FM =

Radio station at Manchester University in North Manchester, Indiana (1968–2016)

North Manchester, Indiana; United States
- Frequency: 89.5 (MHz)

Programming
- Format: Defunct (formerly college radio)
- Affiliations: National Public Radio

Ownership
- Owner: Manchester University, Indiana; (Manchester College)

History
- First air date: September 25, 1947 (as carrier current WMIB); 1968 (license, as WBKE-FM)
- Last air date: June 24, 2016
- Call sign meaning: Brent Barkman, David Kistler, Mike Emrick (former station managers)

Technical information
- Licensing authority: FCC
- Facility ID: 39776
- Class: A
- ERP: 3 kilowatts horizontal
- HAAT: 24 meters (79 ft)
- Transmitter coordinates: 41°0′40″N 85°45′45″W

Links
- Public license information: Public file; LMS

WBKE-FM (89.5 FM) was a college radio station in North Manchester, Indiana. It featured a local college student view on music. It held two event during the year, Fuze fest and Chet fest. The station showed a variety of student DJs from different parts of the world.

WBKE-FM started broadcasting on September 25, 1947. It started as WMIB and was used to broadcast news and sporting events. Its first sports broadcast was December 18, 1947, in a game between Manchester and Ball State. It was broadcast from Muncie, as a basketball game. The radio station continued as WMIB until the 1967–68 school year, when the station went to Federal Communications Commission (FCC) licensing and the call letters were switched to WBKE-FM after the last names of three former station managers.

WBKE-FM held the event Fuze Fest during the fall semester. This event featured local music or a cultural event featuring music. Past Fuze fest have been a showing of the Wizard of Oz, and the band Trackless. Fuze fest 2013 was a concert with the headliners O'Sister Brother.

Chet fest was the big event for the radio station. It was held in spring semester and it was a concert with a big band. It was combined with battle of the bands, where the winner would be able to open for the headliner for chet fest. Past headliners for chet fest include The Dead Records, Stoke 9, The Knux, and recently Junior doctor. A concert was not done for 2014 due to changes in the station.

Manchester University surrendered the station's license to the FCC on June 20, 2016; in its notification, the university said that WBKE-FM would shut down on June 24. The station's license was cancelled on June 27, 2016.

== Notable alumni ==
Mike Emrick
