= XHRE-FM (Guanajuato) =

Radio station in Celaya, Guanajuato, Mexico

XHRE-FM/XERE-AM
- Celaya, Guanajuato; Mexico
- Frequency: 88.1 FM / 920 AM
- Branding: Radio Lobo

Programming
- Format: Regional Mexican

Ownership
- Owner: Grupo Radar; (CBC Televisión del Centro, S.A. de C.V.)
- Sister stations: XHCEL-FM, XHY-FM, XHQRO-FM

History
- First air date: September 19, 1968

Technical information
- Class: B
- Power: 5 kW day 1 kW night
- ERP: 10 kW
- Transmitter coordinates: 20°23′20.8″N 100°47′49.3″W

Links
- Webcast: radiolobobajio.mx
- Website: Listen live

XHRE-FM/XERE-AM is a combo radio station in Celaya, Guanajuato. Owned by Grupo Radar, XHRE/XERE broadcasts on 88.1 FM and 920 AM and carries a Radio Lobo Regional Mexican format.

== History ==
Rafael Sandoval Aguilar built and signed on XERE-AM at 1290 kHz from Salvatierra on September 19, 1968. Broadcasting with 250 watts, XERE was the first station in Salvatierra, joined less than two years later by a competitor, XEFAC-AM on 1380 kHz. In the 1970s and 1980s, it increased its power, and in 1994, it received its FM combo station; by this time, XERE had been moved from Salvatierra to Celaya. The station was sold to Grupo ACIR not long after.

In February 2024, XHRE abandoned the La Comadre format and changed to Radio Lobo (which moved from XHY-FM 96.7), under the administration of Grupo Radar.
