= WBSA =

- Boaz, Alabama; United States
- Broadcast area: Boaz, Alabama
- Frequency: 1300 kHz

Programming
- Format: Christian and southern gospel

Ownership
- Owner: Watkins Broadcasting, Inc.

History
- First air date: October 1, 1959
- Former call signs: WAVC (1959–1961)
- Call sign meaning: Boaz, Alabama

Technical information
- Licensing authority: FCC
- Facility ID: 71098
- Class: D
- Power: 1,000 watts (day); 37 watts (night)
- Transmitter coordinates: 34°12′50″N 86°09′10″W

Links
- Public license information: Public file; LMS
- Webcast: Listen live
- Website: Facebook page

WBSA (1300 AM, "Total Christian Radio") is a radio station licensed to serve Boaz, Alabama, USA. The station is owned by Watkins Broadcasting, Inc. It broadcasts a Christian radio format featuring Southern Gospel music. WBSA is the only radio station licensed to Boaz by the Federal Communications Commission. WBSA plays southern gospel and bluegrass gospel music. It also has on-air devotions.

On-air personalities include Dale Johnson, Chris Watkins, James Cornelius and Beecher Hyde. WBSA carries the weekly football games of the Boaz High School Pirates.

== History ==
The station began regular broadcasting on October 1, 1959, as WAVC. Owned by Ken Sparks and Albert Vearl Cicero (for whom the station was named), WAVC played a mix of popular music, rock'n'roll and easy listening. In 1961, WAVC was bought by L.D. Bentley and Glenn Cornelius (as Radio Sand Mountain, Inc.) and the callsign was changed to the current WBSA. Cornelius operated WBSA until 1982 when it was purchased by Bill Huber and Lawrence Kennamer (as Sand Mountain Advertising, Inc.). The new owners changed the format to Southern Gospel music. In October 1994, the station was purchased by Reverend Roger Watkins, a Baptist minister and evangelist, as Watkins Broadcasting, Inc.

The station acquired an FM translator during the first AM revitalization window in 2016. That station went on the air in late May 2016 on 93.5 MHz.

== Translator ==
| Call sign | Frequency | City of license | FID | ERP (W) | Class | FCC info |
|---|---|---|---|---|---|---|
| W228DD | 93.5 FM | Boaz, Alabama | 157020 | 250 | D | LMS |
