= KVBL =

Coordinates: 45°18′33″N 117°43′54″W

- Union, Oregon; United States
- Broadcast area: La Grande, Oregon
- Frequency: 103.1 MHz

Programming
- Format: Talk radio

Ownership
- Owner: Randy and Debra McKone; (KJDY, LLC)
- Sister stations: KCMB

Technical information
- Licensing authority: FCC
- Facility ID: 189562
- Class: C2
- ERP: 950 watts
- HAAT: 768 meters (2,520 ft)

Links
- Public license information: Public file; LMS
- Webcast: Listen live
- Website: myeasternoregon.com

KVBL (103.1 FM) is a radio station licensed to Union, Oregon. The station broadcasts a talk radio format and is owned by Randy and Debra McKone, through licensee KJDY, LLC.
