= WDBG =

- Dexter, Georgia; United States
- Frequency: 103.1 MHz
- Branding: Big 103.1 FM

Programming
- Format: Classic hits

Ownership
- Owner: radioJones, LLC

Technical information
- Licensing authority: FCC
- Facility ID: 183372
- Class: A
- ERP: 6,000 watts
- HAAT: 60 metres (200 ft)
- Transmitter coordinates: 32°31′25″N 82°56′51″W

Links
- Public license information: Public file; LMS
- Webcast: Listen Live

WDBG (103.1 FM) is a radio station licensed to serve the community of Dexter, Georgia. The station is owned by radioJones, LLC, and airs a classic hits format.

The station was assigned the WDBG call letters by the Federal Communications Commission on July 4, 2011.
