= WEOM-LP =

- Thomasville, North Carolina; United States
- Frequency: 103.1 MHz
- Branding: Miracle 103.1

Programming
- Format: Gospel

Ownership
- Owner: World Evangelistic Outreach Ministries, Inc.

History
- Former call signs: WEOM-LP (2003–2013); WTZO-LP (2013–2015)

Technical information
- Licensing authority: FCC
- Facility ID: 135688
- Class: L1
- ERP: 100 watts
- HAAT: 6.9 meters (23 feet)
- Transmitter coordinates: 35°56′34″N 80°06′51″W

Links
- Public license information: LMS

WEOM-LP (103.1 FM, "Miracle 103.1") is a radio station licensed to Thomasville, North Carolina, United States, and serving the Piedmont Triad area. The station is currently owned by World Evangelistic Outreach Ministries, Inc. It airs a Gospel music format.

The station was assigned the WEOM-LP call letters by the Federal Communications Commission on March 28, 2003. The station changed its call sign to WTZO-LP on September 1, 2013, and back to WEOM-LP on August 1, 2015.
