= WZST-FM =

Coordinates: 39.546°N 79.933°W

Simulcasting WZST Fairmont
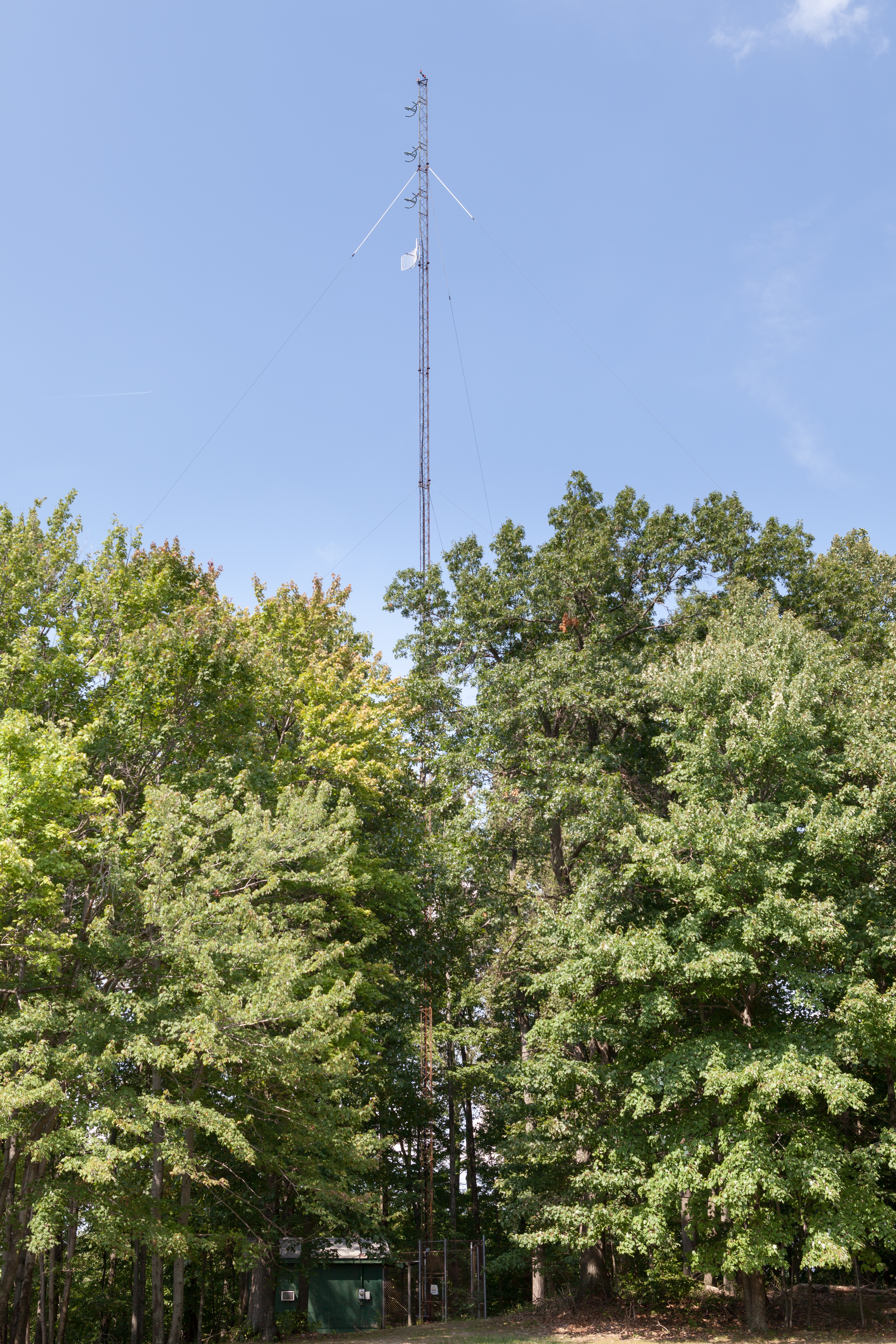
- WZST-FM antenna
- Westover, West Virginia; United States
- Broadcast area: Morgantown–Fairmont, West Virginia
- Frequency: 100.9 MHz
- Branding: The Torch

Programming
- Format: Conservative talk
- Affiliations: Genesis Communications Network; Townhall News; Westwood One; Pittsburgh Steelers; Pittsburgh Penguins

Ownership
- Owner: John Fredricks; (Disruptor Radio LLC)
- Sister stations: WZST; WRLF-FM; WRLF; WHTI

History
- First air date: 1983
- Former call signs: WJCF (1981–1986); WMQC (1986–1998); WZST (1998–2026)
- Call sign meaning: "Star" (former format)

Technical information
- Licensing authority: FCC
- Facility ID: 68305
- Class: A
- ERP: 3,000 watts
- HAAT: 81 meters (266 ft)
- Translator: 95.3 W237FP (Morgantown)

Links
- Public license information: Public file; LMS
- Webcast: Listen live
- Website: www.wvthetorch.com

WZST-FM (100.9 FM, "The Torch") is a conservative talk formatted broadcast radio station licensed to Westover, West Virginia, serving the Morgantown–Fairmont area. WZST is owned and operated by John Fredricks, through licensee Disruptor Radio LLC.

== History ==
In the 1990s, the station was adult contemporary formatted known as "Mix 100.9" WMQC. WMQC simulcast (to better serve Clarksburg) with former sister station WPDX-FM, which was known as "Mix 104.9", prior to becoming a classic country station.

WZST branded itself as Star 100.9 featuring a country music format before switching to adult contemporary as "Variety 101" in June 2008.

On December 22, 2016, LHTC Media announced that following the end of its Christmas music stint on December 26, WZST would flip to variety hits, using the small market Jack FM network, as "100.9 Jack FM". WZST retained its West Virginia Mountaineers broadcasts, including football, men's and women's basketball, and baseball.

On January 6, 2025, WZST replaced the adult hits format with a simulcast of conservative talk-formatted WMMN (920 AM) in Fairmont, branded as "The Torch". On April 15, 2026, the station added the "-FM" suffix to allow WMMN to become WZST.

On July 1, 2026 it was announced that WZST had lost its flagship rights to the West Virginia Mountaineers broadcasts as they will return to the original flagship stations WVAQ-FM and WAJR-AM in Morgantown beginning with the 2026-27 football season.
