= XESTRC-AM =

Public radio station in Tenabo, Campeche

- Tenabo, Campeche; Mexico
- Frequency: 920 AM
- Branding: Voces Campeche

Programming
- Format: Public radio

Ownership
- Owner: Government of the State of Campeche; (Sistema de Televisión y Radio de Campeche)

History
- Former call signs: XETEB-AM (1986–2016)
- Call sign meaning: Sistema de Televisión y Radio de Campeche

Technical information
- Facility ID: 101750 (FCC)
- Class: B
- Power: 1.0 kWs daytime 0.5 kW (500 watts) nighttime
- Transmitter coordinates: 20°01′52″N 90°14′19″W

Links
- Webcast: Listen live
- Website: vocescampeche.com.mx

XESTRC-AM is a Mexican public radio station owned by the government of the state of Campeche, located in southeast Mexico. The station broadcasts on 920 AM.

It was founded in 1986 as XETEB-AM, a partnership station with the Instituto Mexicano de la Radio. IMER shed the station in 2005.

A discontinuous permit history required a new concession to be issued for XETEB in 2016, at which time the callsign was changed to XESTRC-AM.
