= KPAS (California) =

Radio station in California

KPAS (1490 AM) was a radio station licensed to Banning, California. It was established on November 9, 1949.

In September 1953, the Federal Communications Commission (FCC) authorized assignment of the KPAS license from Byron-Wood Motors to Henry Chester Darwin, for $6,100.

KPAS was shut down on April 21, 1972, with its license deleted on November 27. Frederick R. Cote subsequently applied for a new station using the KPAS facilities, which was licensed in 1981 as KGUD (now KMET).
