= WRLF-FM =

Simulcasting WZST Fairmont
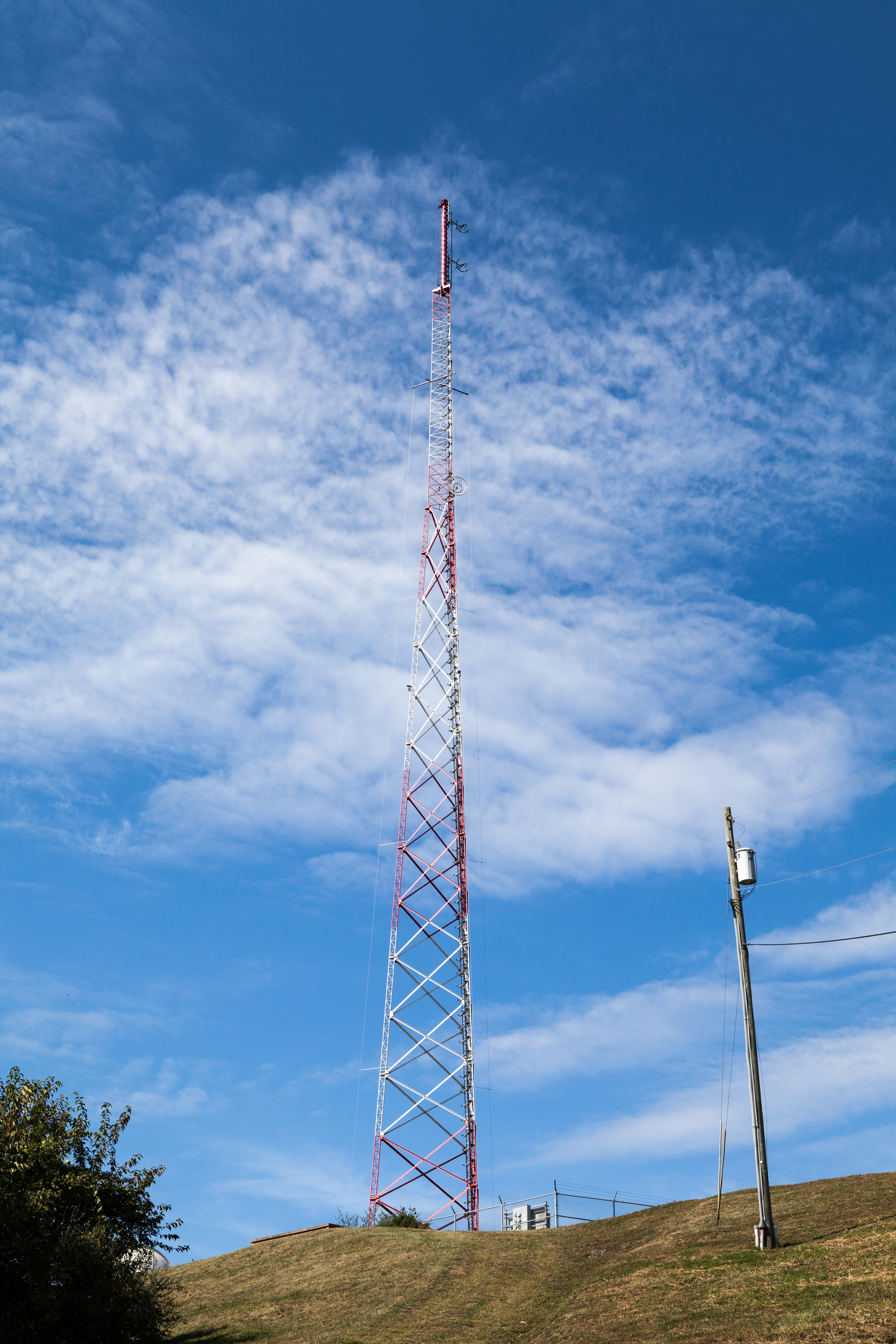
- Tower on Leonard Avenue
- Fairmont, West Virginia; United States
- Broadcast area: North-Central West Virginia
- Frequency: 94.3 MHz
- Branding: The Torch

Programming
- Format: Conservative talk
- Affiliations: Genesis Communications Network; Townhall News; Westwood One; Pittsburgh Steelers; Pittsburgh Penguins

Ownership
- Owner: John Fredricks; (Disruptor Radio LLC)
- Sister stations: WZST; WRLF; WZST-FM; WHTI

History
- First air date: 1989
- Call sign meaning: Rosemary L. Fantasia

Technical information
- Licensing authority: FCC
- Facility ID: 20460
- Class: A
- ERP: 3,600 watts
- HAAT: 76 meters (249 ft)
- Transmitter coordinates: 39°28′19″N 80°08′26″W

Links
- Public license information: Public file; LMS
- Webcast: Listen live
- Website: www.wvthetorch.com

WRLF-FM (94.3 FM, "The Torch") is a conservative talk formatted broadcast radio station licensed to Fairmont, West Virginia, serving the North-Central West Virginia area. WRLF-FM is owned and operated by John Fredricks , through licensee Disruptor Radio LLC.

== History ==
On August 17, 2020, WRLF changed its format from mainstream rock to a simulcast of sports-formatted WMMN (920 AM), branded as "The Ticket". In late June 2021, WRLF dropped the WMMN simulcast and returned to mainstream rock, under the same "94 Rock" branding as had been used prior to the simulcast.

On January 6, 2025, WRLF ended the mainstream rock format and returned to simulcasting WMMN, now a conservative talk station branded as "The Torch". The "-FM" suffix was added on April 15, 2026, allowing sister station WBKE to become WRLF.
