= KSPN-FM =

Coordinates: 39.226°N 106.834°W

- Aspen, Colorado; United States
- Broadcast area: Aspen, Colorado
- Frequency: 103.1 (MHz)
- Branding: FM 103.1 KSPN

Programming
- Format: Adult album alternative

Ownership
- Owner: Patricia MacDonald Garber and Peter Benedetti; (AlwaysMountainTime, LLC)

History
- First air date: 1970
- Call sign meaning: Aspen

Technical information
- Licensing authority: FCC
- Facility ID: 43884
- Class: A
- ERP: 3,000 watts
- HAAT: −26 meters (−85 ft)

Links
- Public license information: Public file; LMS
- Webcast: Listen live
- Website: www.kspnradio.com

KSPN-FM is an adult album alternative (AAA) radio station. It is owned by Patricia MacDonald Garber and Peter Benedetti through licensee AlwaysMountainTime, LLC. The station broadcasts at 103.1 MHz FM in the Aspen, Colorado, area.

KSPN-FM was first licensed May 18, 1970, and is a heritage station in the Roaring Fork Valley. KSPN covers community and national events in the area, as well as sports.

KSPN-FM is rebroadcast on translators in the following Colorado communities:

- K247AD 97.3 MHz in Carbondale
- K252CU 98.3 MHz in Redstone
- K261AK 100.1 MHz in Basalt
