= Sharpsburg, North Carolina =

- Town
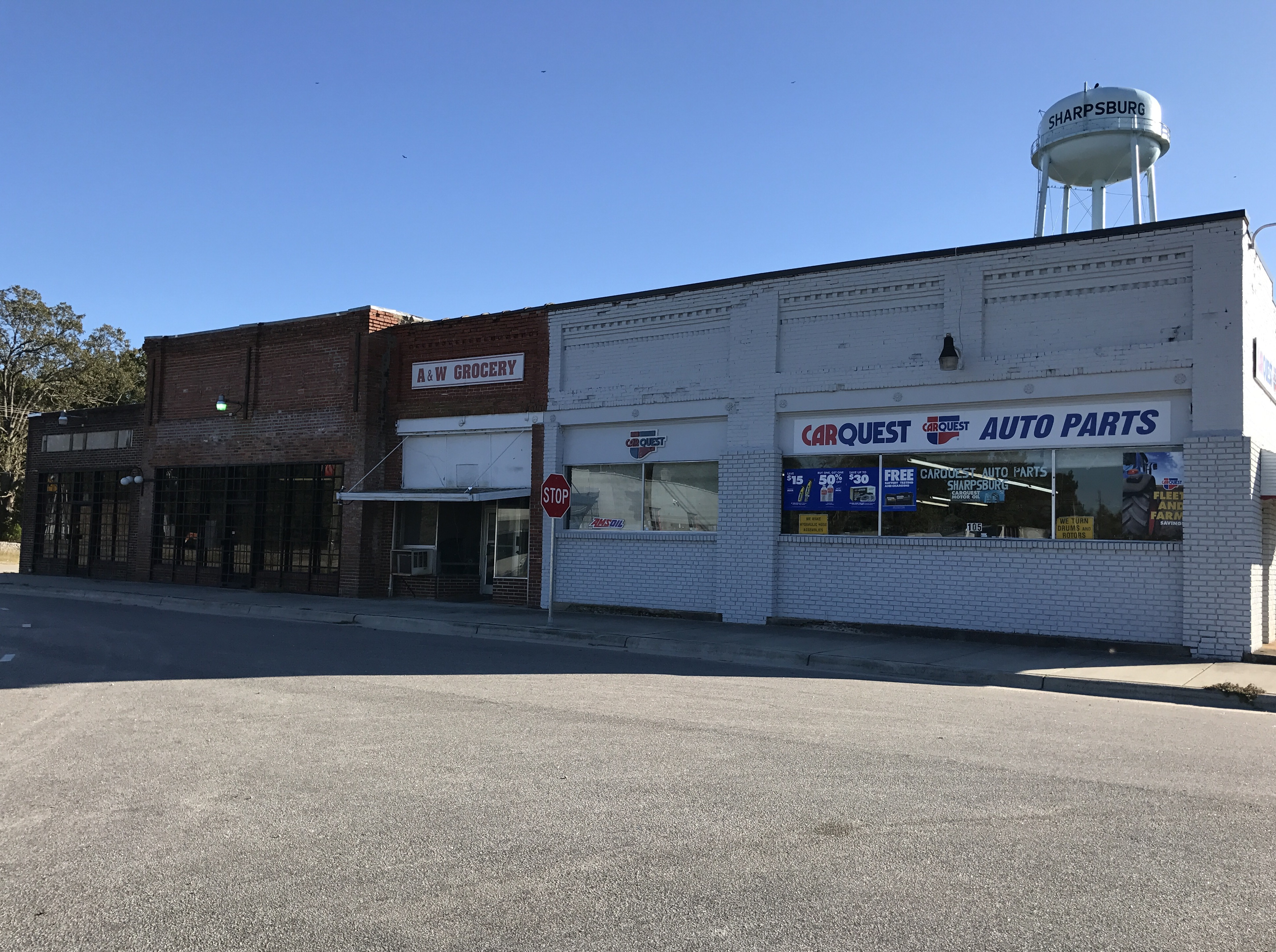
- Cluster of buildings in Sharpsburg's business district
- Motto: "Tri-County Hospitality!"
- Location in Nash County and the state of North Carolina.
- Coordinates: 35°51′59″N 77°49′51″W
- Country: United States
- State: North Carolina
- Counties: Edgecombe, Nash, Wilson

Area
  - Total: 0.99 sq mi (2.57 km^{2})
  - Land: 0.99 sq mi (2.57 km^{2})
  - Water: 0 sq mi (0.00 km^{2})
- Elevation: 138 ft (42 m)

Population (2020)
  - Total: 1,697
  - Density: 1,711.2/sq mi (660.69/km^{2})
- Time zone: UTC-5 (Eastern (EST))
  - Summer (DST): UTC-4 (EDT)
- ZIP code: 27878
- Area code: 252
- FIPS code: 37-61060
- GNIS feature ID: 2407324
- Website: www.sharpsburgnc.com

Sharpsburg is a town in Edgecombe, Nash, and Wilson counties, North Carolina, United States. It is part of the Rocky Mount, North Carolina Metropolitan Statistical Area. As of the 2020 census, Sharpsburg had a population of 1,697.

== Geography ==
Sharpsburg is located in the northern corner of Wilson County and the southwestern corner of Edgecombe County, and near the southeastern corner of Nash County. U.S. Route 301 passes through the center of town. Downtown Rocky Mount is 6 miles (10 km) to the north, and Wilson is 12 miles (19 km) to the south.

According to the United States Census Bureau, Sharpsburg has a total area of 1.0 square mile (2.6 km^{2}), all land.

== Demographics ==
Historical population
| Census | Pop. | Note | %± |
|---|---|---|---|
| 1910 | 121 | | — |
| 1920 | 334 | | 176.0% |
| 1930 | 275 | | −17.7% |
| 1940 | 345 | | 25.5% |
| 1950 | 415 | | 20.3% |
| 1960 | 490 | | 18.1% |
| 1970 | 789 | | 61.0% |
| 1980 | 997 | | 26.4% |
| 1990 | 1,536 | | 54.1% |
| 2000 | 2,421 | | 57.6% |
| 2010 | 2,024 | | −16.4% |
| 2020 | 1,697 | | −16.2% |
U.S. Decennial Census

=== Racial and ethnic composition ===
Sharpsburg town, North Carolina – Racial and ethnic composition Note: the US Census treats Hispanic/Latino as an ethnic category. This table excludes Latinos from the racial categories and assigns them to a separate category. Hispanics/Latinos may be of any race.
| Race / Ethnicity (NH = Non-Hispanic) | Pop 2000 | Pop 2010 | Pop 2020 | % 2000 | % 2010 | % 2020 |
|---|---|---|---|---|---|---|
| White alone (NH) | 929 | 736 | 526 | 38.37% | 36.36% | 31.00% |
| Black or African American alone (NH) | 1,413 | 1,187 | 1,047 | 58.36% | 58.65% | 61.70% |
| Native American or Alaska Native alone (NH) | 5 | 2 | 5 | 0.21% | 0.10% | 0.29% |
| Asian alone (NH) | 2 | 12 | 0 | 0.08% | 0.59% | 0.00% |
| Native Hawaiian or Pacific Islander alone (NH) | 2 | 0 | 0 | 0.08% | 0.00% | 0.00% |
| Other race alone (NH) | 1 | 4 | 12 | 0.04% | 0.20% | 0.71% |
| Mixed race or Multiracial (NH) | 22 | 32 | 58 | 0.91% | 1.58% | 3.42% |
| Hispanic or Latino (any race) | 47 | 51 | 49 | 1.94% | 2.52% | 2.89% |
| Total | 2,421 | 2,024 | 1,697 | 100.00% | 100.00% | 100.00% |

=== 2020 census ===
As of the 2020 United States census, there were 1,697 people, 916 households, and 581 families residing in the town.

=== 2000 census ===
As of the census of 2000, there were 2,421 people, 884 households, and 649 families residing in the town. The population density was 2,646.7 inhabitants per square mile (1,021.9/km^{2}). There were 994 housing units at an average density of 1,086.7 per square mile (419.6/km^{2}). The racial makeup of the town was 39.45% White, 58.65% African American, 0.21% Native American, 0.08% Asian, 0.08% Pacific Islander, 0.54% from other races, and 0.99% from two or more races. Hispanic or Latino of any race were 1.94% of the population.

There were 884 households, out of which 43.2% had children under the age of 18 living with them, 41.2% were married couples living together, 27.0% had a female householder with no husband present, and 26.5% were non-families. 22.2% of all households were made up of individuals, and 5.2% had someone living alone who was 65 years of age or older. The average household size was 2.74 and the average family size was 3.19.

In the town, the population was spread out, with 34.6% under the age of 18, 10.1% from 18 to 24, 32.1% from 25 to 44, 17.3% from 45 to 64, and 6.0% who were 65 years of age or older. The median age was 28 years. For every 100 females, there were 87.2 males. For every 100 females age 18 and over, there were 77.3 males.

The median income for a household in the town was $27,908, and the median income for a family was $30,192. Males had a median income of $26,818 versus $21,422 for females. The per capita income for the town was $12,603. About 19.5% of families and 22.5% of the population were below the poverty line, including 28.4% of those under age 18 and 24.7% of those age 65 or over.
