= WURA =

- Quantico, Virginia; United States
- Broadcast area: Washington metropolitan area
- Frequency: 920 kHz
- Branding: Radio Unida 920

Programming
- Language: Spanish
- Format: Tejano music

Ownership
- Owner: WASP Productions; (Amin Segundo)

Technical information
- Licensing authority: FCC
- Facility ID: 160224
- Class: B
- Power: 7,000 watts day 970 watts night
- Transmitter coordinates: 38°34′5.0″N 77°20′20.0″W
- Translator: 98.1 W251CH (Manassas)

Links
- Public license information: Public file; LMS
- Webcast: Listen live
- Website: www.unida920.com

WURA is a Tejano music broadcast radio station licensed to Quantico, Virginia, serving Metro Washington. WURA is owned and operated by Amin Segundo's WASP Productions.

== Broadcast launch ==
On December 13, 2009, WURA launched broadcasting Christmas music. In January 2010, it converted to a full-time Tejano music format.

== Sales ==
According to radio information website VARTV.com, "WURA is in the process of changing hands from Prince William Broadcasting to Capital Broadcasting VA, LLC. Prince William Broadcasting (which is made up of five partner companies, Dale City Broadcasting 25.5%; Cleo Broadcasting 15%; Bay Broadcasting, Lexington Park Broadcasting and Moonglow Broadcasting each 11.33%.) is selling the station for $205,584."

Effective April 12, 2023, Capital Broadcasting sold WURA, sister station WPWC, and translator W251CH to Amin Segundo for $950,000.
