= WZST (AM) =

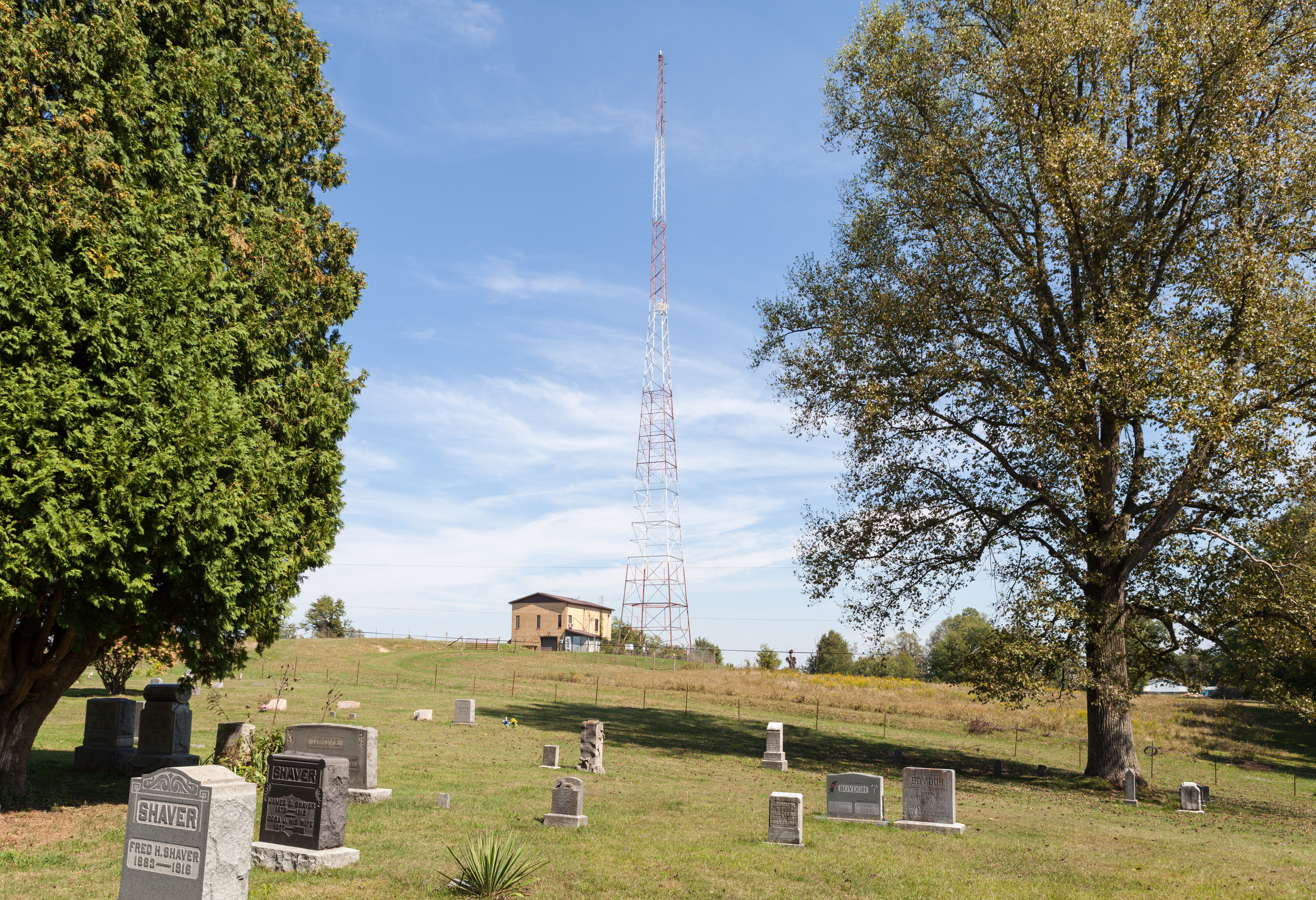
- Tower on Tower Hill Road, Fairmont, West Virginia, seen from the adjacent Grove Cemetery
- Fairmont, West Virginia; United States
- Broadcast area: North-Central West Virginia
- Frequency: 920 kHz
- Branding: The Torch

Programming
- Format: Conservative talk
- Affiliations: Genesis Communications Network; Townhall News; Westwood One; Pittsburgh Steelers; Pittsburgh Penguins

Ownership
- Owner: John Fredricks; (Disruptor Radio LLC)
- Sister stations: WRLF-FM; WRLF; WZST-FM; WHTI

History
- First air date: 1928
- Former call signs: WMMN (1928–2026)
- Call sign meaning: "Star" (former branding of WZST-FM)

Technical information
- Licensing authority: FCC
- Facility ID: 21171
- Class: D
- Power: 5,000 watts day; 200 watts night
- Transmitter coordinates: 39°28′3″N 80°12′20″W
- Translator: 95.7 W239CM (Morgantown)
- Repeaters: 94.3 WRLF-FM (Fairmont); 100.9 WZST-FM (Westover); 105.7 WHTI (Salem); 1490 WRLF (Fairmont)

Links
- Public license information: Public file; LMS
- Webcast: Listen live
- Website: www.wvthetorch.com

WZST (920 AM) is a conservative talk formatted broadcast radio station licensed to Fairmont, West Virginia, serving North-Central West Virginia. WZST is owned and operated by John Fredricks, through licensee Disruptor Radio LLC.

== History ==
On November 1, 1935, WMMN joined the CBS Radio Network. At that time, the station was licensed to A.M. Rowe Inc., with George B. Storer the chief stockholder. It operated on 890 kHz with power of 500 watts daytime and 250 watts at night. The WMMN call sign referred to Matthew Mansfield Neely, a former governor of West Virginia.

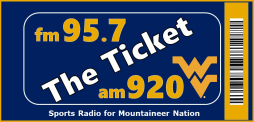
Logo as "The Ticket"

On February 5, 2024, WMMN changed its format from sports to conservative talk, branded as "The Torch". The call sign was changed to WZST on April 15, 2026.
