= WHTI =

Coordinates: 39.318°N 80.438°W

Simulcast of WZST Fairmont
- Salem, West Virginia; United States
- Broadcast area: Clarksburg, West Virginia; Fairmont, West Virginia
- Frequency: 105.7 MHz
- Branding: The Torch

Programming
- Format: Conservative talk
- Affiliations: Genesis Communications Network; Townhall News; Westwood One; Pittsburgh Steelers Radio Network; Pittsburgh Penguins Radio Network

Ownership
- Owner: John Fredricks; (Disruptor Radio LLC)
- Sister stations: WZST-FM; WRLF-FM; WRLF; WZST-FM

History
- First air date: 1990 (as WOBG)
- Former call signs: WXKI (1989–1990); WOBG-FM (1990–2018)
- Call sign meaning: "Hot" (former branding)

Technical information
- Licensing authority: FCC
- Facility ID: 58621
- Class: A
- ERP: 1,950 watts
- HAAT: 177 meters (581 ft)

Links
- Public license information: Public file; LMS
- Webcast: Listen live
- Website: www.wvthetorch.com

WHTI (105.7 FM) is a radio station licensed to Salem, West Virginia, serving the Clarksburg/Fairmont area. WHTI is owned and operated by John Fredricks' Disruptor Radio LLC.

== History ==
WOBG-FM debuted in 1990 as "Oldies But Goodies", playing hits from the late 1950s through the late 1970s. The station featured live, local DJs (“Doctor” Dan Terango hosting mornings, Don Niles with the afternoon drive) until 1995, when it switched to a syndicated oldies format.

WOBG-FM broadcast an active rock format until January 22, 2018, when the station changed its call sign to WHTI and began stunting with the sound of crickets. On January 25, 2018, WHTI launched a top 40 (CHR) format, branded as "Hot 105.7". Following its sale to LHTC Media in September 2023, the station began simulcasting WZST's format under the Jack FM brand, with the "Hot" format moving to WGYE.

On February 5, 2024, WHTI changed its format from a simulcast of WZST to a simulcast of conservative talk-formatted WMMN (920 AM), branded as "The Torch".
