= WKZS =

- Covington, Indiana; United States
- Broadcast area: Danville, Illinois
- Frequency: 103.1 MHz
- Branding: Kiss Country

Programming
- Format: Country
- Affiliations: Dial Global

Ownership
- Owner: Benton-Weatherford Broadcasting, Inc., of Indiana

Technical information
- Licensing authority: FCC
- Facility ID: 4807
- Class: A
- ERP: 3,000 watts
- HAAT: 91.0 meters (298.6 ft)
- Transmitter coordinates: 40°8′46.00″N 87°27′15.00″W

Links
- Public license information: Public file; LMS
- Webcast: Listen live
- Website: kisscountryradio.com

WKZS (103.1 FM, "Kiss Country") is a radio station broadcasting a country music format. Licensed to Covington, Indiana, United States, the station serves the immediate Danville, Illinois area. The station also maintains a sales office in Champaign, Illinois. The station is currently owned by Benton-Weatherford Broadcasting, Inc., of Indiana and features programming from Dial Global's Hot Country format.

In 2012, the station obtained a construction permit from the FCC to relocate its city of license to Thomasboro, Illinois, and to move to 103.3 MHz. This would have moved the station into the Champaign-Urbana radio market, but the station owners were unable to complete the move. In 2015, Benton-Weatherford applied for another construction permit, explaining they had not been able to complete WKZS' move to Thomasboro due to health and technical challenges. The construction permit was granted, but expired in 2018, with the new Thomasboro station still unbuilt. The station remains licensed to Covington as of April 2020.
