= WPTL =

- Canton, North Carolina; United States
- Frequency: 920 kHz
- Branding: WPTL 101.7 FM & 920 AM

Programming
- Format: Classic country

Ownership
- Owner: Skycountry Broadcasting

Technical information
- Licensing authority: FCC
- Class: D
- Power: 500 watts day 38 watts night
- Transmitter coordinates: 35°31′15″N 82°48′24″W
- Translator: 101.7 W269DK (Canton)

Links
- Public license information: Public file; LMS
- Website: wptlradio.net

WPTL (920 AM) is a radio station broadcasting a classic country music format from Local Radio Networks. WPTL is licensed to Canton, North Carolina, United States. The station is currently owned by Skycountry Broadcasting. WPTL went on the air in 1963. Bill Reck owned the station since 1978 and retired on November 12, 2020. Bill's daughter - Terryll Evans is the current owner and is following in her father's footsteps.

WPTL has aired the football games of Pisgah High School since 1992, when WWIT dropped them. The station also airs Pisgah basketball, softball and baseball.

John Anderson is the weekday morning host. The former host was Frank Byrd.

On February 7, 2018, WPTL added an FM signal at 101.7, broadcasting from Chambers Mountain, giving the station better coverage of all of Haywood County, especially at night.
