= WGIE =

- Clarksburg, West Virginia; United States
- Broadcast area: Harrison County, West Virginia
- Frequency: 92.7 MHz
- Branding: True Oldies 92.7 WGIE

Programming
- Format: Oldies
- Affiliations: The True Oldies Channel

Ownership
- Owner: Tom Susman; (Vandalia Media Partners 2 LLC)

History
- First air date: 1975; 51 years ago
- Former call signs: WVHF-FM (1978–2001); WCMX-FM (2001–2002)
- Call sign meaning: play on "Froggy" (former branding)

Technical information
- Licensing authority: FCC
- Facility ID: 67103
- Class: A
- ERP: 620 watts
- HAAT: 204 meters (669 ft)
- Transmitter coordinates: 39°17′27.0″N 80°18′56.0″W

Links
- Public license information: Public file; LMS
- Webcast: Listen live
- Website: wgie927.com

WGIE (92.7 FM) is an oldies-formatted broadcast radio station licensed to Clarksburg, West Virginia, serving Clarksburg and Harrison County, West Virginia. WGIE is owned and operated by Vandalia Media.

== History ==
WGIE was formerly known as WVHF, which went by the name "V93" in the late 1980s and early 1990s, during which time it was a rock station. Prior to that time, it was known as WVHF "Stereo 93", which had an adult contemporary format. The station was assigned the WGIE call sign by the Federal Communications Commission on September 27, 2002. WGIE joined the Froggy Country Network in September 2002. The Froggy Country Network, at its peak, covered 11 counties in Northern West Virginia.

The station was sold to Vandalia Media in September 2023 for $100,000. The sale closed on November 28, and the station then went silent; former simulcast sister WGYE had itself dropped the format back in September, effectively ending the "Froggy Country Network". On February 8, 2024, the station finally came back to air as a member of The True Oldies Channel network as "True Oldies 92.7 WGIE".
