= WRLF (AM) =

Coordinates: 39°28′19″N 80°08′26″W

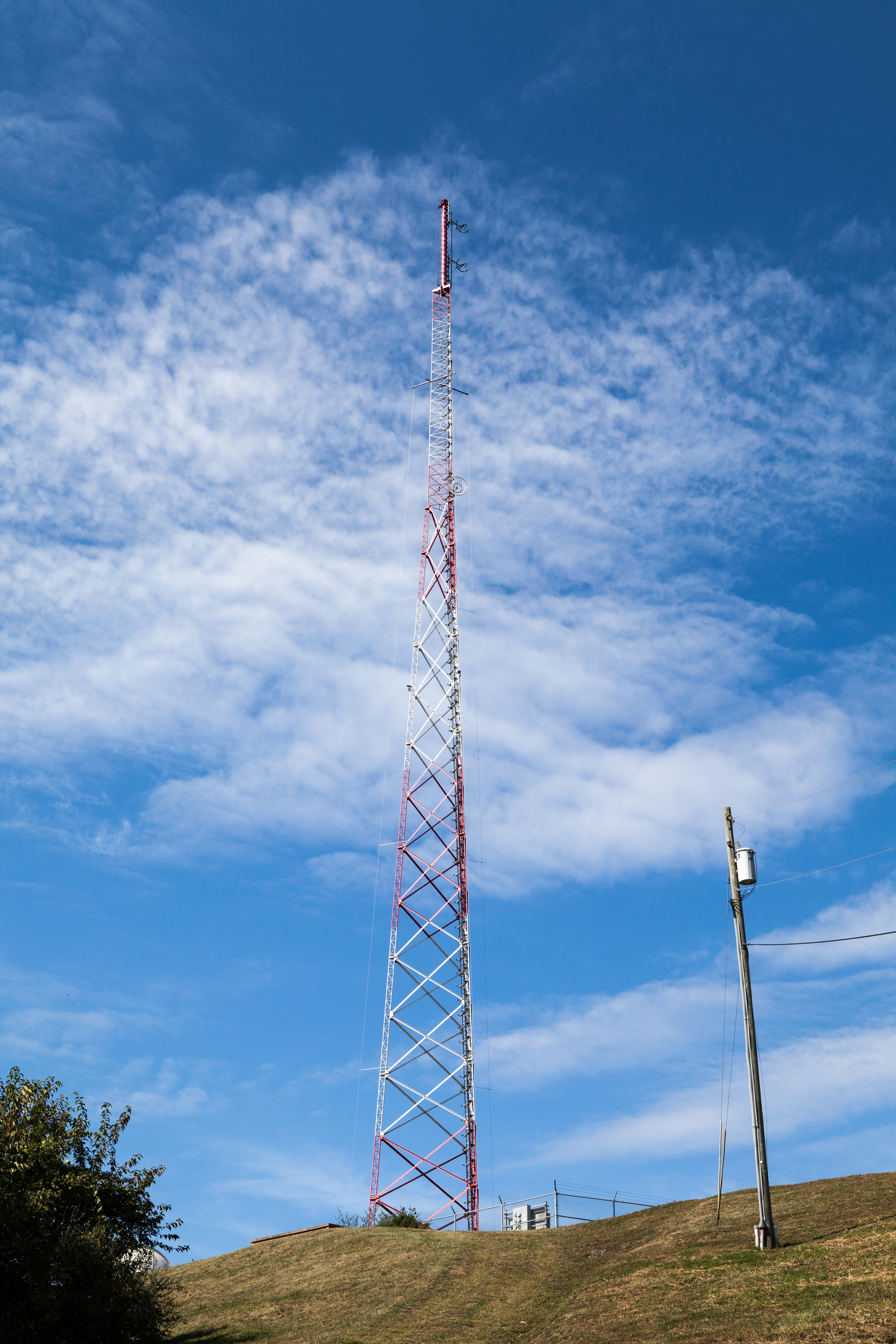
- Tower on Leonard Avenue
- Fairmont, West Virginia; United States
- Broadcast area: Fairmont, West Virginia; Grafton, West Virginia
- Frequency: 1490 kHz
- Branding: The Torch

Programming
- Format: Conservative talk
- Affiliations: Genesis Communications Network; Townhall News; Westwood One; Pittsburgh Steelers; Pittsburgh Penguins

Ownership
- Owner: John Fredricks; (Disruptor Radio LLC)
- Sister stations: WZST-FM; WZST; WRLF-FM; WHTI

History
- First air date: 1948 (as WTCS)
- Former call signs: WTCS (1948–2018); WBKE (2018–2025); WVRM (2025–2026); WBKE (2026)
- Call sign meaning: Rosemary L. Fantasia (derived from WRLF-FM)

Technical information
- Licensing authority: FCC
- Facility ID: 20461
- Class: C
- Power: 1,000 watts unlimited
- Translator: 98.3 W252EF (Morgantown)

Links
- Public license information: Public file; LMS
- Webcast: Listen live
- Website: www.wvthetorch.com

WRLF (1490 kHz, "WRLF Sports 94.3") is a conservative talk formatted broadcast radio station licensed to Fairmont, West Virginia, serving the Fairmont/Grafton area. WRLF is owned and operated by Disruptor Radio, LLC.

== History ==
As WTCS, the station previously aired Laura Ingraham, The Dana Show, Michael Savage, Mark Levin, Joe Pags, and Red Eye Radio.

On August 6, 2018, WBKE changed its format from news/talk to country, branded as "98.3 Blake FM" in reflection of its simulcast on FM translator W252EF (98.3 MHz) in Morgantown, West Virginia. On June 25, 2019, the station switched to classic hits, as "Buzz 98.3".

On January 6, 2025, WBKE dropped the classic its format for a simulcast of conservative talk-formatted WMMN (920 AM), branded as "The Torch". The call sign was changed to WVRM on August 3, 2025, as the station began to simulcast a sports radio format with WRLF (94.3 FM) that included The Dan Patrick Show and Fox Sports Radio, while retaining the John Fredericks Radio Show in the morning. The WBKE call sign returned on February 25, 2026; it then became WRLF on April 15, 2026.
