= XHQRO-FM =

Radio station in Cortázar, Guanajuato–Querétaro

- Cortázar, Guanajuato; Mexico
- Broadcast area: Celaya, Guanajuato and Querétaro, Querétaro
- Frequency: 107.5 MHz
- Branding: Radar 107.5

Programming
- Format: Pop

Ownership
- Owner: Corporación Bajío Comunicaciones; (Radiodifusoras Unidas del Bajío, S.A. de C.V.)
- Sister stations: XHJHS-FM (Querétaro), XHCEL-FM, XHRE-FM, XHY-FM (Celaya)

History
- First air date: March 20, 1986 (concession)
- Former call signs: XHCGT-FM (1986–2011)
- Call sign meaning: "Querétaro"

Technical information
- Class: C1
- ERP: 48 kW
- Transmitter coordinates: 20°25′16.7″N 100°53′43.0″W

Links
- Website: radarfm.mx

XHQRO-FM is a radio station on 107.5 FM in Cortázar, Guanajuato, Mexico, serving Celaya and Querétaro, Querétaro with a transmitter atop Cerro La Minilla in Guanajuato. XHQRO is owned by Corporación Bajío Comunicaciones and carries a pop format known as Radar 107.5.

== History ==
XHQRO received its concession on March 20, 1986, signing on the very next day. It was known as XHCGT-FM and was the first FM station in Celaya.

In 2011, XHCGT was approved for a callsign change to XHQRO-FM, reflecting CBC's desire to use XHQRO as a move-in into the Querétaro radio market without relocating its transmitter. The station operates from studios in Querétaro and puts on live musical events there.
