= Genesis Communications Network =

Former American radio network

- Website type: Radio network
- Available in: English
- Dissolved: May 5, 2024; 2 years ago
- Owners: Ted Anderson, Genesis Communications Network Inc.
- Website: www.GCNlive.com
- Launched: 1998; 28 years ago
- Current status: Defunct

The Genesis Communications Network, often referred to as GCN, was a radio network that operated from 1998 to 2024, owned by Ted Anderson. The network, at its peak, produced 45 shows, distributed on more than 780 radio stations nationwide. The network was known for talk programming; Alex Jones was its most prominent syndicated personality.

== History and programming ==
Ted Anderson is the owner of Genesis Communications Network. Anderson created the network in 1998 as a way to promote his company, Midas Resources, a precious metals firm. As of September 11, 2015, Anderson's bullion coin representative registration, No. 40389579, was revoked. Further, Anderson was prohibited from being an owner, officer, member, or shareholder of any entity that holds a bullion coin dealer registration in the State of Minnesota for two years.

Based in Minnesota, the network carries "a lot of conspiracy talk radio". "By far the biggest star" on the network is Alex Jones, a conspiracy theorist who became one of Genesis Communications Network's first personalities in 1999, after Jones was fired by an Austin radio station. Jones promoted the 9/11 truth movement and claimed that the Boston Marathon bombing, Washington Navy Yard shooting, and other events "are actually 'false flag' operations" by the U.S. government "or evil 'globalist' forces planning to take over the world." Jones' syndication with the network allowed him to reach a much larger audience; "[a]lmost overnight, he was on a hundred stations."

On April 19, 2024, Genesis announced that it would be shutting down on May 5.

== Legal issues ==
In May 2018, Genesis Communications Network and Midas Resources were named in a defamation lawsuit brought against Alex Jones and his syndicators. The suit was brought by the families of six victims killed in the Sandy Hook Elementary School shooting and an FBI agent who was at the scene. In July 2022, Genesis was dropped as a defendant, with one of the plaintiff's lawyers stating that having Genesis involved at trial would have distracted from the main target: Mr. Jones and his media organization.

== Shows and personalities ==
The network's shows include:

- The Alex Jones Show. Hosted by radio personality Alex Jones. As of September 2020, Jones' show aired on 73 affiliate stations
- Daliah Wachs
- On Air With Doug, Jen and Victoria - GCN is one of two networks that distributes Doug Stephan's morning program, carrying it via relay from USA Radio Network. Upon the network's shutdown, Stephan plans on reducing the program to weekends only and moving to Talk Media Network and United Stations Radio Networks.
- Home Talk USA with "The Cajun Contractor" Michael King
- Free Talk Live
- Science Fantastic - Science show hosted by Dr. Michio Kaku

Brokered programming, some for alternative medical products, fills out the rest of the schedules.

Jeff Rense was carried by Genesis Communications Network after the Premiere Radio Networks dropped the show in the late 1990s. GCN took over distribution at that time, and carried the show through August 2009, at which point Rense pulled the show from the network, after he accused fellow Jones of terrorizing his family.

Psychologist Joy Browne hosted her nationally syndicated program on the network in the last few years before her death.
