= List of FM radio stations in the United States by call sign (initial letters WK–WM) =

This is a list of FM radio stations in the United States having call signs beginning with the letters WK through WM. Low-power FM radio stations, those with designations such as WKBR-LP, have not been included in this list.

== WK-- ==
Callsign	Frequency	City of license
WKAA	99.5 FM	Willacoochee, Georgia
WKAD	93.7 FM	Harrietta, Michigan
WKAI	100.1 FM	Macomb, Illinois
WKAK	104.5 FM	Albany, Georgia
WKAO	91.1 FM	Ashland, Kentucky
WKAQ-FM	104.7 FM	San Juan, Puerto Rico
WKAR-FM	90.5 FM	East Lansing, Michigan
WKAY	105.3 FM	Knoxville, Illinois
WKBB	100.9 FM	Mantee, Mississippi
WKBC-FM	97.3 FM	North Wilkesboro, North Carolina
WKBE	100.3 FM	Warrensburg, New York
WKBH-FM	102.7 FM	Onalaska, Wisconsin
WKBI-FM	93.9 FM	St. Marys, Pennsylvania
WKBP	95.9 FM	Benton, Pennsylvania
WKBQ	93.5 FM	Covington, Tennessee
WKBU	95.7 FM	New Orleans, Louisiana
WKBX	106.3 FM	Kingsland, Georgia
WKCA	97.7 FM	Salt Lick, Kentucky
WKCB-FM	107.1 FM	Hindman, Kentucky
WKCD	90.3 FM	Cedarville, Ohio
WKCH	106.5 FM	Whitewater, Wisconsin
WKCI-FM	101.3 FM	Hamden, Connecticut
WKCJ	93.3 FM	White Sulphur Springs, West Virginia
WKCL	91.5 FM	Ladson, South Carolina
WKCN	99.3 FM	Fort Benning South, Georgia
WKCO	91.9 FM	Gambier, Ohio
WKCQ	98.1 FM	Saginaw, Michigan
WKCR-FM	89.9 FM	New York City
WKCS	91.1 FM	Knoxville, Tennessee
WKCX	89.1 FM	Crittenden, Kentucky
WKCY-FM	104.3 FM	Harrisonburg, Virginia
WKDB	95.3 FM	Laurel, Delaware
WKDD	98.1 FM	Munroe Falls, Ohio
WKDE-FM	105.5 FM	Altavista, Virginia
WKDF	103.3 FM	Nashville, Tennessee
WKDJ-FM	96.5 FM	Clarksdale, Mississippi
WKDL	104.9 FM	Brockport, New York
WKDO-FM	98.7 FM	Liberty, Kentucky
WKDP-FM	99.5 FM	Corbin, Kentucky
WKDQ	99.5 FM	Henderson, Kentucky
WKDS	89.9 FM	Kalamazoo, Michigan
WKDU	91.7 FM	Philadelphia
WKDZ-FM	106.5 FM	Cadiz, Kentucky
WKEA-FM	98.3 FM	Scottsboro, Alabama
WKEB	99.3 FM	Medford, Wisconsin
WKEE-FM	100.5 FM	Huntington, West Virginia
WKEK	89.1 FM	Gunflint Lake, Minnesota
WKEL	88.1 FM	Webster, New York
WKEN	88.5 FM	Kenton, Ohio
WKER-FM	91.1 FM	McCormick, South Carolina
WKES	91.1 FM	Lakeland, Florida
WKET	98.3 FM	Kettering, Ohio
WKEU-FM	88.9 FM	The Rock, Georgia
WKEY-FM	93.7 FM	Key West, Florida
WKEZ-FM	96.9 FM	Tavernier, Florida
WKFA	89.3 FM	St. Catherine, Florida
WKFC	101.9 FM	North Corbin, Kentucky
WKFF	102.1 FM	Sardis, Mississippi
WKFM	96.1 FM	Huron, Ohio
WKFR-FM	103.3 FM	Battle Creek, Michigan
WKFS	107.1 FM	Milford, Ohio
WKFT	101.3 FM	Strattanville, Pennsylvania
WKFV	107.3 FM	Clinton, North Carolina
WKFX	99.1 FM	Rice Lake, Wisconsin
WKFY	98.7 FM	East Harwich, Massachusetts
WKGA	97.5 FM	Goodwater, Alabama
WKGB-FM	92.5 FM	Conklin, New York
WKGC-FM	90.7 FM	Panama City, Florida
WKGG	90.9 FM	Bolton
WKGL-FM	96.7 FM	Loves Park, Illinois
WKGO	88.1 FM	Murrysville, Pennsylvania
WKGR	98.7 FM	Wellington, Florida
WKGS	106.7 FM	Irondequoit, New York
WKGV	104.1 FM	Swansboro, North Carolina
WKHC	97.1 FM	Hatteras, North Carolina
WKHF	93.7 FM	Lynchburg, Virginia
WKHG	104.9 FM	Leitchfield, Kentucky
WKHI	94.9 FM	Newark, Maryland
WKHJ	104.5 FM	Mountain Lake Park, Maryland
WKHK	95.3 FM	Colonial Heights, Virginia
WKHL	92.1 FM	Palmyra, Pennsylvania
WKHM-FM	105.3 FM	Brooklyn, Michigan
WKHQ-FM	105.9 FM	Charlevoix, Michigan
WKHR	91.5 FM	Bainbridge, Ohio
WKHS	90.5 FM	Worton, Maryland
WKHT	104.5 FM	Knoxville, Tennessee
WKHW	88.5 FM	Halifax, Pennsylvania
WKHX-FM	101.5 FM	Marietta, Georgia
WKHY	93.5 FM	Lafayette, Indiana
WKIB	96.5 FM	Anna, Illinois
WKID	95.9 FM	Vevay, Indiana
WKIH	90.3 FM	Twin City, Georgia
WKIK	102.9 FM	California, Maryland
WKIM	98.9 FM	Munford, Tennessee
WKIO	105.5 FM	Monticello, Illinois
WKIS	99.9 FM	Boca Raton, Florida
WKIT	100.3 FM	Brewer, Maine
WKIV	88.1 FM	Westerly, Rhode Island
WKIW	88.3 FM	Ironwood, Michigan
WKIX-FM	102.9 FM	Raleigh, North Carolina
WKJA	91.9 FM	Brunswick, Ohio
WKJC	104.7 FM	Tawas City, Michigan
WKJD	90.3 FM	Columbus, Indiana
WKJL	88.1 FM	Clarksburg, West Virginia
WKJM	99.3 FM	Petersburg, Virginia
WKJN	104.9 FM	Centreville, Mississippi
WKJO	102.3 FM	Smithfield, North Carolina
WKJQ-FM	97.3 FM	Parsons, Tennessee
WKJS	105.7 FM	Richmond, Virginia
WKJT	102.3 FM	Teutopolis, Illinois
WKJX	96.7 FM	Elizabeth City, North Carolina
WKJY	98.3 FM	Hempstead, New York
WKJZ	94.9 FM	Hillman, Michigan
WKKB	100.3 FM	Middletown, Rhode Island
WKKC	89.3 FM	Chicago
WKKF	102.3 FM	Ballston Spa, New York
WKKG	101.5 FM	Columbus, Indiana
WKKI	94.3 FM	Celina, Ohio
WKKJ	94.3 FM	Chillicothe, Ohio
WKKL	90.7 FM	West Barnstable, Massachusetts
WKKM	89.7 FM	Speaker Township, Michigan
WKKN	101.9 FM	Westminster, Vermont
WKKO	99.9 FM	Toledo, Ohio
WKKQ	96.1 FM	Barbourville, Kentucky
WKKR	97.7 FM	Auburn, Alabama
WKKS-FM	104.9 FM	Vanceburg, Kentucky
WKKT	96.9 FM	Statesville, North Carolina
WKKV-FM	100.7 FM	Racine, Wisconsin
WKKW	97.9 FM	Fairmont, West Virginia
WKKY	104.7 FM	Geneva, Ohio
WKKZ	92.7 FM	Dublin, Georgia
WKLA-FM	96.3 FM	Ludington, Michigan
WKLB-FM	102.5 FM	Waltham, Massachusetts
WKLC-FM	105.1 FM	St. Albans, West Virginia
WKLG	102.1 FM	Rock Harbor, Florida
WKLH	96.5 FM	Milwaukee, Wisconsin
WKLI-FM	100.9 FM	Albany, New York
WKLK-FM	96.5 FM	Cloquet, Minnesota
WKLL	94.9 FM	Frankfort, New York
WKLM	95.3 FM	Millersburg, Ohio
WKLN	102.3 FM	Wilmington, Ohio
WKLO	96.9 FM	Hardinsburg, Indiana
WKLQ	94.5 FM	Holland, Michigan
WKLR	96.5 FM	Fort Gregg-Adams, Virginia
WKLS	105.9 FM	Southside, Alabama
WKLT	97.5 FM	Kalkaska, Michigan
WKLU	101.9 FM	Brownsburg, Indiana
WKLV-FM	93.5 FM	Butler, Alabama
WKLW-FM	94.7 FM	Paintsville, Kentucky
WKLX	100.7 FM	Brownsville, Kentucky
WKLZ	105.9 FM	Syracuse, New York
WKMD	90.9 FM	Madisonville, Kentucky
WKMH	102.5 FM	Hudson, Michigan
WKMJ-FM	93.5 FM	Hancock, Michigan
WKMK	106.3 FM	Eatontown, New Jersey
WKML	95.7 FM	Lumberton, North Carolina
WKMM	96.7 FM	Kingwood, West Virginia
WKMO-FM	101.5 FM	Vine Grove, Kentucky
WKMS-FM	91.3 FM	Murray, Kentucky
WKMT	89.5 FM	Fulton, Kentucky
WKMV	88.3 FM	Muncie, Indiana
WKMW	88.7 FM	Americus, Georgia
WKMX	106.7 FM	Enterprise, Alabama
WKMY	99.9 FM	Athol, Massachusetts
WKMZ	103.3 FM	Salem, West Virginia
WKNA	98.3 FM	Logan, Ohio
WKNC-FM	88.1 FM	Raleigh, North Carolina
WKNE	103.7 FM	Keene, New Hampshire
WKNG-FM	89.1 FM	Heflin, Alabama
WKNH	91.3 FM	Keene, New Hampshire
WKNJ-FM	90.3 FM	Union Township, New Jersey
WKNK	103.5 FM	Callaway, Florida
WKNL	100.9 FM	New London, Connecticut
WKNN-FM	99.1 FM	Pascagoula, Mississippi
WKNO-FM	91.1 FM	Memphis, Tennessee
WKNP	90.1 FM	Jackson, Tennessee
WKNS	90.3 FM	Kinston, North Carolina
WKNU	106.3 FM	Brewton, Alabama
WKNZ	88.7 FM	Harrington, Delaware
WKOA	105.3 FM	Lafayette, Indiana
WKOE	106.3 FM	North Cape May, New Jersey
WKOL	105.1 FM	Plattsburgh, New York
WKOM	101.7 FM	Columbia, Tennessee
WKOR-FM	94.9 FM	Columbus, Mississippi
WKOS	104.9 FM	Kingsport, Tennessee
WKOV-FM	96.7 FM	Oak Hill, Ohio
WKOY-FM	100.9 FM	Princeton, West Virginia
WKOZ-FM	98.3 FM	Carthage, Mississippi
WKPA	107.9 FM	Port Matilda, Pennsylvania
WKPB	89.5 FM	Henderson, Kentucky
WKPE-FM	103.9 FM	South Yarmouth, Massachusetts
WKPK	88.3 FM	Michigamme, Michigan
WKPL	92.1 FM	Ellwood City, Pennsylvania
WKPO	105.9 FM	Soldiers Grove, Wisconsin
WKPQ	105.3 FM	Hornell, New York
WKPS	90.7 FM	State College, Pennsylvania
WKPW	90.7 FM	Knightstown, Indiana
WKPX	88.5 FM	Sunrise, Florida
WKQB	102.9 FM	Pocahontas, West Virginia
WKQC	104.7 FM	Charlotte, North Carolina
WKQI	95.5 FM	Detroit, Michigan
WKQL	103.3 FM	Brookville, Pennsylvania
WKQQ	100.1 FM	Winchester, Kentucky
WKQR	92.7 FM	Mullens, West Virginia
WKQS-FM	101.9 FM	Negaunee, Michigan
WKQV	105.5 FM	Cowen, West Virginia
WKQX	101.1 FM	Chicago
WKQY	100.1 FM	Tazewell, Virginia
WKQZ	93.3 FM	Midland, Michigan
WKRA-FM	92.7 FM	Holly Springs, Mississippi
WKRB	90.3 FM	Brooklyn, New York
WKRE	88.1 FM	Argo, Alabama
WKRF	107.9 FM	Tobyhanna, Pennsylvania
WKRH	106.5 FM	Fair Haven, New York
WKRJ	91.5 FM	New Philadelphia, Ohio
WKRK-FM	92.3 FM	Cleveland Heights, Ohio
WKRL-FM	100.9 FM	North Syracuse, New York
WKRO-FM	93.1 FM	Port Orange, Florida
WKRP-FM	97.7 FM	Mason, Ohio
WKRQ	101.9 FM	Cincinnati
WKRR	92.3 FM	Asheboro, North Carolina
WKRT	89.3 FM	Richmond, Indiana
WKRU	106.7 FM	Allouez, Wisconsin
WKRV	107.1 FM	Vandalia, Illinois
WKRW	89.3 FM	Wooster, Ohio
WKRX	96.7 FM	Roxboro, North Carolina
WKRY	88.1 FM	Versailles, Indiana
WKRZ	98.5 FM	Freeland, Pennsylvania
WKSB	102.7 FM	Williamsport, Pennsylvania
WKSC-FM	103.5 FM	Chicago
WKSD	99.7 FM	Paulding, Ohio
WKSE	98.5 FM	Niagara Falls, New York
WKSF	99.9 FM	Old Fort, North Carolina
WKSG	98.3 FM	Garrison, Kentucky
WKSI-FM	98.3 FM	Stephens City, Virginia
WKSJ-FM	94.9 FM	Mobile, Alabama
WKSK-FM	101.9 FM	South Hill, Virginia
WKSL	97.9 FM	Neptune Beach, Florida
WKSM	99.5 FM	Fort Walton Beach, Florida
WKSO	97.3 FM	Natchez, Mississippi
WKSP	96.3 FM	Aiken, South Carolina
WKSQ	94.5 FM	Ellsworth, Maine
WKSS	95.7 FM	Hartford-Meriden, Connecticut
WKST-FM	96.1 FM	Pittsburgh, Pennsylvania
WKSU	89.7 FM	Kent, Ohio
WKSV	89.1 FM	Thompson, Ohio
WKSW	98.5 FM	Cookeville, Tennessee
WKSZ	95.9 FM	De Pere, Wisconsin
WKTG	93.9 FM	Madisonville, Kentucky
WKTH	88.5 FM	Tullahoma, Tennessee
WKTI	94.5 FM	Milwaukee, Wisconsin
WKTJ-FM	99.3 FM	Farmington, Maine
WKTK	98.5 FM	Crystal River, Florida
WKTL	90.7 FM	Struthers, Ohio
WKTM	106.1 FM	Soperton, Georgia
WKTN	95.3 FM	Kenton, Ohio
WKTO	88.9 FM	Edgewater, Florida
WKTQ	92.3 FM	Oakland, Maryland
WKTS	90.1 FM	Kingston, Tennessee
WKTT	97.5 FM	Salisbury, Maryland
WKTU	103.5 FM	Lake Success, New York
WKTZ-FM	95.9 FM	Loch Lynn Heights, Maryland
WKUA	88.5 FM	Moundville, Alabama
WKUB	105.1 FM	Blackshear, Georgia
WKUE	90.9 FM	Elizabethtown, Kentucky
WKUL	92.1 FM	Cullman, Alabama
WKUZ	95.9 FM	Wabash, Indiana
WKVB	107.3 FM	Westborough, Massachusetts
WKVC	88.9 FM	North Myrtle Beach, South Carolina
WKVE	103.1 FM	Mount Pleasant, Pennsylvania
WKVF	94.9 FM	Bartlett, Tennessee
WKVG	94.5 FM	Greenville, South Carolina
WKVH	91.9 FM	Monticello, Florida
WKVI-FM	99.3 FM	Knox, Indiana
WKVJ	89.7 FM	Dannemora, New York
WKVK	106.7 FM	Semora, North Carolina
WKVL	104.9 FM	La Follette, Tennessee
WKVN	95.3 FM	Morganfield, Kentucky
WKVO	89.9 FM	Georgetown, Kentucky
WKVP	106.9 FM	Camden, New Jersey
WKVR	102.5 FM	Baltimore, Ohio
WKVS	103.3 FM	Lenoir, North Carolina
WKVT-FM	92.7 FM	Brattleboro, Vermont
WKVU	107.3 FM	Utica, New York
WKVV	97.3 FM	Gardendale, Alabama
WKVW	93.3 FM	Marmet, West Virginia
WKVY	88.1 FM	Somerset, Kentucky
WKVZ	98.7 FM	Holmes Beach, Florida
WKWC	90.3 FM	Owensboro, Kentucky
WKWI	101.7 FM	Kilmarnock, Virginia
WKWJ	91.9 FM	Key West, Florida
WKWK-FM	97.3 FM	Wheeling, West Virginia
WKWM	91.5 FM	Marathon, Florida
WKWO	90.9 FM	Wooster, Ohio
WKWP	88.1 FM	Williamsport, Pennsylvania
WKWR	89.9 FM	Key West, Florida
WKWS	96.1 FM	Charleston, West Virginia
WKWV	90.1 FM	Watertown, New York
WKWX	93.5 FM	Savannah, Tennessee
WKWY	102.7 FM	Tompkinsville, Kentucky
WKWZ	88.5 FM	Syosset, New York
WKXA-FM	100.5 FM	Findlay, Ohio
WKXB	99.9 FM	Boiling Spring Lakes, North Carolina
WKXC-FM	99.5 FM	Aiken, South Carolina
WKXD-FM	106.9 FM	Monterey, Tennessee
WKXG	92.7 FM	Moorhead, Mississippi
WKXH	105.5 FM	St. Johnsbury, Vermont
WKXI-FM	107.5 FM	Magee, Mississippi
WKXJ	103.7 FM	Walden, Tennessee
WKXK	96.7 FM	Pine Hill, Alabama
WKXM-FM	97.7 FM	Winfield, Alabama
WKXN	95.7 FM	Fort Deposit, Alabama
WKXP	94.3 FM	Kingston, New York
WKXQ	92.5 FM	Rushville, Illinois
WKXS-FM	94.5 FM	Leland, North Carolina
WKXU	102.5 FM	Hillsborough, North Carolina
WKXW	101.5 FM	Trenton, New Jersey
WKXX	102.9 FM	Attalla, Alabama
WKXY	92.1 FM	Merigold, Mississippi
WKXZ	93.9 FM	Norwich, New York
WKYA	105.5 FM	Greenville, Kentucky
WKYB	107.5 FM	Perryville, Kentucky
WKYE	96.5 FM	Johnstown, Pennsylvania
WKYF	92.1 FM	Fredonia, Kentucky
WKYG	89.1 FM	Murray, Kentucky
WKYL	102.1 FM	Lawrenceburg, Kentucky
WKYM	101.7 FM	Monticello, Kentucky
WKYN	107.7 FM	Mount Sterling, Kentucky
WKYP	90.1 FM	Ledbetter, Kentucky
WKYQ	93.3 FM	Paducah, Kentucky
WKYR-FM	107.9 FM	Burkesville, Kentucky
WKYS	93.9 FM	Washington, D.C.
WKYU-FM	88.9 FM	Bowling Green, Kentucky
WKYV	100.3 FM	Petersburg, Virginia
WKYX-FM	94.3 FM	Golconda, Illinois
WKYZ	101.3 FM	Key Colony Beach, Florida
WKZA	106.9 FM	Lakewood, New York
WKZB	97.9 FM	Newton, Mississippi
WKZC	94.9 FM	Scottville, Michigan
WKZE-FM	98.1 FM	Salisbury, Connecticut
WKZF	102.3 FM	Morton, Illinois
WKZJ	92.7 FM	Eufaula, Alabama
WKZL	107.5 FM	Winston-Salem, North Carolina
WKZM	104.3 FM	Sarasota, Florida
WKZP	95.9 FM	West Ocean City, Maryland
WKZQ-FM	96.1 FM	Forestbrook, South Carolina
WKZR	102.3 FM	Milledgeville, Georgia
WKZS	103.1 FM	Covington, Indiana
WKZU	104.9 FM	Iuka, Mississippi
WKZV	102.1 FM	Tybee Island, Georgia
WKZW	94.3 FM	Sandersville, Mississippi
WKZX-FM	93.5 FM	Lenoir City, Tennessee
WKZY	92.9 FM	Chilton, Wisconsin
WKZZ	92.5 FM	Tifton, Georgia

== WL-- ==
Callsign	Frequency	City of license
WLAB	88.3 FM	Fort Wayne, Indiana
WLAI	107.1 FM	Wilmore, Kentucky
WLAN-FM	96.9 FM	Lancaster, Pennsylvania
WLAU	99.3 FM	Heidelberg, Mississippi
WLAV-FM	96.9 FM	Grand Rapids, Michigan
WLAW-FM	97.5 FM	Whitehall, Michigan
WLAY-FM	100.1 FM	Littleville, Alabama
WLAZ	89.1 FM	Kissimmee, Florida
WLBC-FM	104.1 FM	Muncie, Indiana
WLBF	89.1 FM	Montgomery, Alabama
WLBL-FM	91.9 FM	Wausau, Wisconsin
WLBS	91.7 FM	Bristol, Pennsylvania
WLBW	92.1 FM	Fenwick Island, Delaware
WLCA	89.9 FM	Godfrey, Illinois
WLCH-FM	91.3 FM	Lancaster, Pennsylvania
WLCL	93.9 FM	Sellersburg, Indiana
WLCN	96.3 FM	Atlanta, Illinois
WLCS	98.3 FM	North Muskegon, Michigan
WLCT	102.1 FM	Lafayette, Tennessee
WLCU	88.7 FM	Campbellsville, Kentucky
WLCW	100.1 FM	West Salem, Wisconsin
WLCY	106.3 FM	Blairsville, Pennsylvania
WLCZ	98.7 FM	Lincolnton, Georgia
WLDB	93.3 FM	Milwaukee, Wisconsin
WLDE	101.7 FM	Fort Wayne, Indiana
WLDI	95.5 FM	Fort Pierce, Florida
WLDN	98.7 FM	Ludington, Michigan
WLDQ	102.5 FM	Dothan, Alabama
WLDR-FM	101.9 FM	Traverse City, Michigan
WLDV	107.9 FM	Frederiksted, United States Virgin Islands
WLDW	105.5 FM	Salisbury, Maryland
WLEE-FM	95.1 FM	Sherman, Mississippi
WLEL	94.3 FM	Ellaville, Georgia
WLEN	103.9 FM	Adrian, Michigan
WLER-FM	97.7 FM	Butler, Pennsylvania
WLEV	100.7 FM	Allentown, Pennsylvania
WLEW-FM	102.1 FM	Bad Axe, Michigan
WLEY-FM	107.9 FM	Aurora, Illinois
WLEZ	99.3 FM	Lebanon Junction, Kentucky
WLFA	91.3 FM	Asheville, North Carolina
WLFC	88.3 FM	North Baltimore, Ohio
WLFE	90.9 FM	Cutler Bay, Florida
WLFF	106.5 FM	Georgetown, South Carolina
WLFH	88.9 FM	Claxton, Georgia
WLFJ-FM	89.3 FM	Greenville, South Carolina
WLFK	95.3 FM	Gouverneur, New York
WLFM	103.9 FM	Lawrenceburg, Tennessee
WLFN	88.9 FM	Flint, Michigan
WLFP	99.7 FM	Memphis, Tennessee
WLFR	91.7 FM	Pomona, New Jersey
WLFS	91.9 FM	Port Wentworth, Georgia
WLFV	98.9 FM	Midlothian, Virginia
WLFW	92.7 FM	Johnston, South Carolina
WLFX	106.7 FM	Berea, Kentucky
WLFZ	101.9 FM	Springfield, Illinois
WLGA	90.5 FM	Columbus, Georgia
WLGC-FM	105.7 FM	Greenup, Kentucky
WLGD	107.7 FM	Dallas, Pennsylvania
WLGE	106.9 FM	Baileys Harbor, Wisconsin
WLGF	107.1 FM	Gulfport, Mississippi
WLGH	88.1 FM	Leroy Township, Michigan
WLGI	90.9 FM	Hemingway, South Carolina
WLGK	94.7 FM	New Albany, Indiana
WLGP	100.3 FM	Harkers Island, North Carolina
WLGQ	91.5 FM	Gadsden, Alabama
WLGR	93.5 FM	Warrensburg, New York
WLGU	90.7 FM	Lancaster, New York
WLGV	90.9 FM	Gloversville, New York
WLGW	100.5 FM	Glade Spring, Virginia
WLGX	106.9 FM	Bedford, Virginia
WLGY	105.5 FM	Pennington Gap, Virginia
WLGZ-FM	102.7 FM	Webster, New York
WLHC	103.1 FM	Robbins, North Carolina
WLHE	88.7 FM	Cadiz, Kentucky
WLHH	104.9 FM	Ridgeland, South Carolina
WLHI	90.3 FM	Schnecksville, Pennsylvania
WLHK	97.1 FM	Shelbyville, Indiana
WLHM	102.3 FM	Logansport, Indiana
WLHR-FM	92.1 FM	Lavonia, Georgia
WLHS	89.9 FM	West Chester, Ohio
WLHT-FM	95.7 FM	Grand Rapids, Michigan
WLHV	88.1 FM	Annandale-on-Hudson, New York
WLHW	91.5 FM	Casey, Illinois
WLIC	97.1 FM	Frostburg, Maryland
WLIF	101.9 FM	Baltimore, Maryland
WLIH	107.1 FM	Whitneyville, Pennsylvania
WLIN-FM	101.1 FM	Durant, Mississippi
WLIR-FM	107.1 FM	Hampton Bays, New York
WLIT-FM	93.9 FM	Chicago
WLIW-FM	88.3 FM	Southampton, New York
WLJA-FM	93.5 FM	Ellijay, Georgia
WLJC	102.1 FM	Beattyville, Kentucky
WLJD	107.9 FM	Charlevoix, Michigan
WLJE	105.5 FM	Valparaiso, Indiana
WLJH	90.7 FM	Glens Falls, New York
WLJI	98.3 FM	Summerton, South Carolina
WLJK	89.1 FM	Aiken, South Carolina
WLJN-FM	89.9 FM	Traverse City, Michigan
WLJP	89.3 FM	Monroe, New York
WLJR	88.5 FM	Birmingham, Alabama
WLJS-FM	91.9 FM	Jacksonville, Alabama
WLJV	89.5 FM	Spotsylvania, Virginia
WLJW-FM	95.9 FM	Fife Lake, Michigan
WLKA	88.3 FM	Tafton, Pennsylvania
WLKB	89.1 FM	Bay City, Michigan
WLKC	105.7 FM	Campton, New Hampshire
WLKE	93.5 FM	Gallitzin, Pennsylvania
WLKG	96.1 FM	Lake Geneva, Wisconsin
WLKH	97.7 FM	Somerset, Pennsylvania
WLKI	100.3 FM	Angola, Indiana
WLKJ	105.7 FM	Portage, Pennsylvania
WLKK	107.7 FM	Wethersfield Township, New York
WLKL	89.9 FM	Mattoon, Illinois
WLKM-FM	95.9 FM	Three Rivers, Michigan
WLKN	98.1 FM	Cleveland, Wisconsin
WLKO	102.9 FM	Hickory, North Carolina
WLKP	91.9 FM	Belpre, Ohio
WLKQ-FM	102.3 FM	Buford, Georgia
WLKR-FM	95.3 FM	Norwalk, Ohio
WLKS-FM	102.9 FM	West Liberty, Kentucky
WLKT	104.5 FM	Lexington-Fayette, Kentucky
WLKU	98.9 FM	Rock Island, Illinois
WLKV	90.7 FM	Ripley, West Virginia
WLKW	95.3 FM	Celoron, New York
WLKX-FM	95.9 FM	Forest Lake, Minnesota
WLKZ	104.9 FM	Wolfeboro, New Hampshire
WLLD	94.1 FM	Lakeland, Florida
WLLE	102.1 FM	Mayfield, Kentucky
WLLF	96.7 FM	Mercer, Pennsylvania
WLLG	99.3 FM	Lowville, New York
WLLI	102.3 FM	Munfordville, Kentucky
WLLK-FM	102.3 FM	Somerset, Kentucky
WLLM-FM	90.1 FM	Carlinville, Illinois
WLLR-FM	103.7 FM	Davenport, Iowa
WLLS	99.3 FM	Beulah, Michigan
WLLT	94.3 FM	Polo, Illinois
WLLW	101.7 FM	Geneva, New York
WLLX	97.5 FM	Lawrenceburg, Tennessee
WLLY-FM	99.5 FM	Palm Beach Gardens, Florida
WLLZ	106.7 FM	Detroit, Michigan
WLMD	104.7 FM	Bushnell, Illinois
WLME	102.7 FM	Lewisport, Kentucky
WLMG	101.9 FM	New Orleans, Louisiana
WLMI	92.9 FM	Grand Ledge, Michigan
WLML-FM	100.3 FM	Lake Park, Florida
WLMN	89.7 FM	Manistee, Michigan
WLMU	91.3 FM	Harrogate, Tennessee
WLMW	90.7 FM	Manchester, New Hampshire
WLMZ-FM	102.3 FM	Pittston, Pennsylvania
WLND	98.1 FM	Signal Mountain, Tennessee
WLNF	90.9 FM	Rapids, New York
WLNG	92.1 FM	Sag Harbor, New York
WLNH-FM	98.3 FM	Laconia, New Hampshire
WLNI	105.9 FM	Lynchburg, Virginia
WLNJ	91.7 FM	Lakehurst, New Jersey
WLNK-FM	100.9 FM	Indian Trail, North Carolina
WLNQ	104.7 FM	White Pine, Tennessee
WLNX	88.9 FM	Lincoln, Illinois
WLNZ	89.7 FM	Lansing, Michigan
WLOF	101.7 FM	Elma, New York
WLOL-FM	89.7 FM	Star City, West Virginia
WLOM	90.5 FM	Somers Point, New Jersey
WLOQ	96.3 FM	Oil City, Pennsylvania
WLOV-FM	99.5 FM	Daytona Beach Shores, Florida
WLPE	91.7 FM	Augusta, Georgia
WLPF	98.5 FM	Ocilla, Georgia
WLPG	91.7 FM	Florence, South Carolina
WLPR-FM	89.1 FM	Lowell, Indiana
WLPS-FM	89.5 FM	Lumberton, North Carolina
WLPT	88.3 FM	Jesup, Georgia
WLPW	105.5 FM	Lake Placid, New York
WLQB	93.5 FM	Ocean Isle Beach, North Carolina
WLQC	103.1 FM	Sharpsburg, North Carolina
WLQI	97.7 FM	Rensselaer, Indiana
WLQK	95.9 FM	Livingston, Tennessee
WLQM-FM	101.7 FM	Franklin, Virginia
WLQQ	106.7 FM	West Lafayette, Indiana
WLRA	88.1 FM	Lockport, Illinois
WLRB	102.7 FM	Ocean City, New Jersey
WLRD	96.9 FM	Willard, Ohio
WLRF	107.1 FM	Greenville, Pennsylvania
WLRH	89.3 FM	Huntsville, Alabama
WLRJ	104.7 FM	Greenville, Mississippi
WLRK	91.5 FM	Greenville, Mississippi
WLRN-FM	91.3 FM	Miami, Florida
WLRQ-FM	99.3 FM	Cocoa, Florida
WLRR	100.7 FM	Milledgeville, Georgia
WLRW	94.5 FM	Champaign, Illinois
WLRX	106.1 FM	Vinton, Virginia
WLRY	88.9 FM	Rushville, Ohio
WLS-FM	94.7 FM	Chicago
WLSB	98.5 FM	Augusta, Illinois
WLSE	103.3 FM	Canton, Illinois
WLSF	88.3 FM	Starke, Florida
WLSK	100.9 FM	Lebanon, Kentucky
WLSM-FM	107.1 FM	Louisville, Mississippi
WLSN	89.7 FM	Grand Marais, Minnesota
WLSR	92.7 FM	Galesburg, Illinois
WLST	95.1 FM	Marinette, Wisconsin
WLSU	88.9 FM	La Crosse, Wisconsin
WLSW	103.9 FM	Scottdale, Pennsylvania
WLTB	101.7 FM	Johnson City, New York
WLTC	103.7 FM	Cusseta, Georgia
WLTE	95.5 FM	Powdersville, South Carolina
WLTF	97.5 FM	Martinsburg, West Virginia
WLTJ	92.9 FM	Pittsburgh, Pennsylvania
WLTK	103.3 FM	New Market, Virginia
WLTL	88.1 FM	La Grange, Illinois
WLTN-FM	96.7 FM	Lisbon, New Hampshire
WLTO	102.5 FM	Nicholasville, Kentucky
WLTR	91.3 FM	Columbia, South Carolina
WLTS	103.3 FM	Greer, South Carolina
WLTU	92.1 FM	Manitowoc, Wisconsin
WLTW	106.7 FM	New York City
WLTY	96.7 FM	Cayce, South Carolina
WLUB	105.7 FM	Augusta, Georgia
WLUJ	89.7 FM	Springfield, Illinois
WLUM-FM	102.1 FM	Milwaukee, Wisconsin
WLUN	100.9 FM	Pinconning, Michigan
WLUP	105.3 FM	Cambridge, Minnesota
WLUR	91.5 FM	Lexington, Virginia
WLUS-FM	98.3 FM	Clarksville, Virginia
WLUW	88.7 FM	Chicago
WLUZ	88.5 FM	Levittown, Puerto Rico
WLVB	93.9 FM	Morrisville, Vermont
WLVE	105.3 FM	Mukwonago, Wisconsin
WLVF-FM	90.3 FM	Haines City, Florida
WLVG	105.1 FM	Clermont, Georgia
WLVH	101.1 FM	Hardeeville, South Carolina
WLVK	105.5 FM	Fort Knox, Kentucky
WLVM	98.3 FM	Chickasaw, Alabama
WLVN	101.3 FM	Grenada, Mississippi
WLVO (FM)	95.5 FM	Providence, Rhode Island
WLVQ	96.3 FM	Columbus, Ohio
WLVR-FM	91.3 FM	Bethlehem, Pennsylvania
WLVS-FM	106.5 FM	Clifton, Tennessee
WLVU	97.1 FM	Belle Meade, Tennessee
WLVV	88.3 FM	Midland, Maryland
WLVW	107.3 FM	Washington, District of Columbia
WLVX	100.7 FM	Westminster, Maryland
WLVZ	107.1 FM	Collins, Mississippi
WLWF	96.5 FM	Marseilles, Illinois
WLWI-FM	92.3 FM	Montgomery, Alabama
WLWJ	88.1 FM	Petersburg, Illinois
WLWX	88.1 FM	Wheaton, Illinois
WLXA	98.3 FM	Loretto, Tennessee
WLXB	98.9 FM	Bethel, North Carolina
WLXC	103.1 FM	Columbia, South Carolina
WLXD	104.5 FM	State College, Mississippi
WLXF	105.5 FM	Macon, Georgia
WLXJ	88.9 FM	Battle Ground, Indiana
WLXK	88.3 FM	Boiling Springs, North Carolina
WLXO	105.5 FM	Mount Sterling, Kentucky
WLXP	88.1 FM	Savannah, Georgia
WLXQ	99.1 FM	Greensboro, Alabama
WLXR	96.1 FM	Tomah, Wisconsin
WLXT	96.3 FM	Petoskey, Michigan
WLXV	96.7 FM	Cadillac, Michigan
WLXW	89.7 FM	Waynesboro, Mississippi
WLXX	101.5 FM	Richmond, Kentucky
WLXZ	90.3 FM	Pinehurst, North Carolina
WLYB	96.3 FM	Livingston, Alabama
WLYD	93.5 FM	Chandler, Indiana
WLYE-FM	94.1 FM	Glasgow, Kentucky
WLYF	101.5 FM	Miami, Florida
WLYG	88.3 FM	Jasper, Georgia
WLYH-FM	103.9 FM	Big Island, Virginia
WLYJ	98.9 FM	Quitman, Mississippi
WLYK	102.7 FM	Cape Vincent, New York
WLYU	100.9 FM	Lyons, Georgia
WLYY	90.7 FM	Louisville, Mississippi
WLZA	96.1 FM	Eupora, Mississippi
WLZK	94.1 FM	Paris, Tennessee
WLZL	107.9 FM	College Park, Maryland
WLZN	92.3 FM	Macon, Georgia
WLZT	94.1 FM	Worthington, Indiana
WLZV	94.3 FM	Buckland, Virginia
WLZW	98.7 FM	Utica, New York
WLZX-FM	99.3 FM	Northampton, Massachusetts
WLZZ	104.5 FM	Montpelier, Ohio

== WM-- ==
Callsign	Frequency	City of license
WMAB-FM	89.9 FM	Mississippi State, Mississippi
WMAD	96.3 FM	Cross Plains, Wisconsin
WMAE-FM	89.5 FM	Booneville, Mississippi
WMAG	99.5 FM	High Point, North Carolina
WMAH-FM	90.3 FM	Biloxi, Mississippi
WMAL-FM	105.9 FM	Woodbridge, Virginia
WMAN-FM	98.3 FM	Fredericktown, Ohio
WMAO-FM	90.9 FM	Greenwood, Mississippi
WMAS-FM	94.7 FM	Enfield, Connecticut
WMAU-FM	88.9 FM	Bude, Mississippi
WMAV-FM	90.3 FM	Oxford, Mississippi
WMAW-FM	88.1 FM	Meridian, Mississippi
WMAX-FM	96.1 FM	Holland, Michigan
WMAY-FM	92.7 FM	Taylorville, Illinois
WMBI-FM	90.1 FM	Chicago
WMBJ	88.3 FM	Murrells Inlet, South Carolina
WMBL	88.1 FM	Mitchell, Indiana
WMBR	88.1 FM	Cambridge, Massachusetts
WMBU	89.1 FM	Forest, Mississippi
WMBV	91.9 FM	Dixons Mills, Alabama
WMBW	88.9 FM	Chattanooga, Tennessee
WMBX	102.3 FM	Jensen Beach, Florida
WMBZ	92.5 FM	West Bend, Wisconsin
WMCD	106.5 FM	Rocky Ford, Georgia
WMCE-FM	88.5 FM	Erie, Pennsylvania
WMCG	104.9 FM	Milan, Georgia
WMCI	101.3 FM	Mattoon, Illinois
WMCM	103.3 FM	Rockland, Maine
WMCN	91.7 FM	St. Paul, Minnesota
WMCO	90.7 FM	New Concord, Ohio
WMCQ	91.7 FM	Muskegon, Michigan
WMCV	96.3 FM	Farmersburg, Indiana
WMCX	88.9 FM	West Long Branch, New Jersey
WMDC	98.7 FM	Mayville, Wisconsin
WMDH-FM	102.5 FM	New Castle, Indiana
WMDJ-FM	100.1 FM	Allen, Kentucky
WMDM	97.7 FM	Lexington Park, Maryland
WMDR-FM	88.9 FM	Oakland, Maine
WMEA	90.1 FM	Portland, Maine
WMEB-FM	91.9 FM	Orono, Maine
WMED	89.7 FM	Calais, Maine
WMEE	97.3 FM	Fort Wayne, Indiana
WMEF	106.5 FM	Fort Kent, Maine
WMEG	106.9 FM	Guayama, Puerto Rico
WMEH	90.9 FM	Bangor, Maine
WMEK	88.1 FM	Kennebunkport, Maine
WMEM	106.1 FM	Presque Isle, Maine
WMEP	90.5 FM	Camden, Maine
WMEQ-FM	92.1 FM	Menomonie, Wisconsin
WMEV-FM	93.9 FM	Marion, Virginia
WMEW	91.3 FM	Waterville, Maine
WMEY	88.1 FM	Bowdoin, Maine
WMEZ	94.1 FM	Pensacola, Florida
WMFC	99.3 FM	Monroeville, Alabama
WMFE-FM	90.7 FM	Orlando, Florida
WMFG-FM	106.3 FM	Hibbing, Minnesota
WMFL	88.5 FM	Florida City, Florida
WMFM	107.9 FM	Key West, Florida
WMFO	91.5 FM	Medford, Massachusetts
WMFQ	92.9 FM	Ocala, Florida
WMFS-FM	92.9 FM	Bartlett, Tennessee
WMFT	88.9 FM	Tuscaloosa, Alabama
WMFU	90.1 FM	Mount Hope, New York
WMFV	89.5 FM	Cedar Creek, Florida
WMGA	97.9 FM	Kenova, West Virginia
WMGB	95.1 FM	Montezuma, Georgia
WMGC-FM	105.1 FM	Detroit, Michigan
WMGF	107.7 FM	Mount Dora, Florida
WMGH-FM	105.5 FM	Tamaqua, Pennsylvania
WMGI	100.7 FM	Terre Haute, Indiana
WMGK	102.9 FM	Philadelphia
WMGL	101.7 FM	Ravenel, South Carolina
WMGM	103.7 FM	Atlantic City, New Jersey
WMGN	98.1 FM	Madison, Wisconsin
WMGP	98.1 FM	Hogansville, Georgia
WMGQ	98.3 FM	New Brunswick, New Jersey
WMGS	92.9 FM	Wilkes-Barre, Pennsylvania
WMGU	106.9 FM	Southern Pines, North Carolina
WMGV	103.3 FM	Newport, North Carolina
WMGX	93.1 FM	Portland, Maine
WMGZ	97.7 FM	Eatonton, Georgia
WMHB	89.7 FM	Waterville, Maine
WMHC	91.5 FM	South Hadley, Massachusetts
WMHH	96.7 FM	Clifton Park, New York
WMHI	94.7 FM	Cape Vincent, New York
WMHK	89.7 FM	Columbia, South Carolina
WMHN	89.3 FM	Webster, New York
WMHQ	90.1 FM	Malone, New York
WMHR	102.9 FM	Syracuse, New York
WMHS	88.1 FM	Pike Creek, Delaware
WMHT-FM	89.1 FM	Schenectady, New York
WMHU	91.1 FM	Cold Brook, New York
WMHW-FM	91.5 FM	Mt. Pleasant, Michigan
WMHX	105.1 FM	Waunakee, Wisconsin
WMHY	88.5 FM	Richfield Springs, New York
WMIA-FM	93.9 FM	Miami Beach, Florida
WMIB	103.5 FM	Fort Lauderdale, Florida
WMIE-FM	91.5 FM	Cocoa, Florida
WMIH	89.5 FM	Geneva, Ohio
WMIK-FM	92.7 FM	Middlesboro, Kentucky
WMIL-FM	106.1 FM	Waukesha, Wisconsin
WMIM	98.3 FM	Luna Pier, Michigan
WMIO	102.3 FM	Cabo Rojo, Puerto Rico
WMIS-FM	92.1 FM	Blackduck, Minnesota
WMIT	106.9 FM	Black Mountain, North Carolina
WMIX-FM	94.1 FM	Mount Vernon, Illinois
WMJB	95.3 FM	Valley, Alabama
WMJC	91.9 FM	Richland, Michigan
WMJD	100.7 FM	Grundy, Virginia
WMJI	105.7 FM	Cleveland, Ohio
WMJJ	96.5 FM	Birmingham, Alabama
WMJK	100.9 FM	Clyde, Ohio
WMJL-FM	102.7 FM	Marion, Kentucky
WMJM	101.3 FM	Jeffersontown, Kentucky
WMJO	97.3 FM	Essexville, Michigan
WMJT	96.7 FM	McMillan, Michigan
WMJU	104.3 FM	Bude, Mississippi
WMJV	99.5 FM	Grifton, North Carolina
WMJW	107.5 FM	Rosedale, Mississippi
WMJX	106.7 FM	Boston, Massachusetts
WMJY	93.7 FM	Biloxi, Mississippi
WMJZ-FM	101.5 FM	Gaylord, Michigan
WMKB	102.9 FM	Earlville, Illinois
WMKC	102.9 FM	Indian River, Michigan
WMKD	105.5 FM	Pickford, Michigan
WMKJ	88.1 FM	Tavernier, Florida
WMKL	91.9 FM	Hammocks, Florida
WMKO	91.7 FM	Marco, Florida
WMKR	94.3 FM	Pana, Illinois
WMKS	100.3 FM	High Point, North Carolina
WMKV	89.3 FM	Reading, Ohio
WMKW	89.3 FM	Crossville, Tennessee
WMKX	105.5 FM	Brookville, Pennsylvania
WMKY	90.3 FM	Morehead, Kentucky
WMKZ	93.1 FM	Monticello, Kentucky
WMLE	94.1 FM	Germantown, Tennessee
WMLG	89.9 FM	Guayanilla, Puerto Rico
WMLJ	90.5 FM	Summersville, West Virginia
WMLL	96.5 FM	Bedford, New Hampshire
WMLN-FM	91.5 FM	Milton, Massachusetts
WMLQ	97.7 FM	Manistee, Michigan
WMLS	88.7 FM	Grand Marais, Minnesota
WMLU	91.3 FM	Farmville, Virginia
WMLV	89.7 FM	Miami, Florida
WMLX	103.3 FM	St. Marys, Ohio
WMMA-FM	93.9 FM	Nekoosa, Wisconsin
WMMC	105.9 FM	Marshall, Illinois
WMME-FM	92.3 FM	Augusta, Maine
WMMG-FM	93.5 FM	Brandenburg, Kentucky
WMMH	91.9 FM	Houtzdale, Pennsylvania
WMMJ	102.3 FM	Bethesda, Maryland
WMMM-FM	105.5 FM	Verona, Wisconsin
WMMO	98.9 FM	Orlando, Florida
WMMQ	94.9 FM	East Lansing, Michigan
WMMR	93.3 FM	Philadelphia
WMMS	100.7 FM	Cleveland, Ohio
WMMT	88.7 FM	Whitesburg, Kentucky
WMMX	107.7 FM	Dayton, Ohio
WMMY	106.1 FM	Jefferson, North Carolina
WMMZ	103.5 FM	Berwick, Pennsylvania
WMNA-FM	106.3 FM	Gretna, Virginia
WMNC-FM	92.1 FM	Morganton, North Carolina
WMNF	88.5 FM	Tampa, Florida
WMNG	104.9 FM	Christiansted, Virgin Islands
WMNP	99.3 FM	Block Island, Rhode Island
WMNR	88.1 FM	Monroe, Connecticut
WMNV	104.1 FM	Rupert, Vermont
WMNX	97.3 FM	Wilmington, North Carolina
WMOC	88.7 FM	Lumber City, Georgia
WMOD	96.7 FM	Bolivar, Tennessee
WMOI	97.7 FM	Monmouth, Illinois
WMOM	102.7 FM	Pentwater, Michigan
WMOO	92.1 FM	Derby Center, Vermont
WMOQ	92.3 FM	Bostwick, Georgia
WMOR-FM	106.1 FM	Morehead, Kentucky
WMOS	102.3 FM	Stonington, Connecticut
WMOT	89.5 FM	Murfreesboro, Tennessee
WMOV-FM	107.7 FM	Norfolk, Virginia
WMOZ	106.9 FM	Moose Lake, Minnesota
WMPA	93.1 FM	Ferrysburg, Michigan
WMPG	90.9 FM	Gorham, Maine
WMPH	91.7 FM	Wilmington, Delaware
WMPI	105.3 FM	Scottsburg, Indiana
WMPK	93.5 FM	Summit, Mississippi
WMPN-FM	91.3 FM	Jackson, Mississippi
WMPR	90.1 FM	Jackson, Mississippi
WMPZ	93.5 FM	Harrison, Tennessee
WMQA-FM	95.9 FM	Minocqua, Wisconsin
WMQR	96.1 FM	Broadway, Virginia
WMQS	88.5 FM	Murphy, North Carolina
WMQT	107.7 FM	Ishpeming, Michigan
WMQZ	104.1 FM	Colchester, Illinois
WMRA	90.7 FM	Harrisonburg, Virginia
WMRF-FM	95.7 FM	Lewistown, Pennsylvania
WMRG	93.5 FM	Morgan, Georgia
WMRK-FM	107.9 FM	Shorter, Alabama
WMRL	89.9 FM	Lexington, Virginia
WMRN-FM	106.9 FM	Marion, Ohio
WMRQ-FM	104.1 FM	Waterbury, Connecticut
WMRR	101.7 FM	Muskegon Heights, Michigan
WMRS	107.7 FM	Monticello, Indiana
WMRT	88.3 FM	Marietta, Ohio
WMRX-FM	97.7 FM	Beaverton, Michigan
WMRY	103.5 FM	Crozet, Virginia
WMRZ	98.1 FM	Dawson, Georgia
WMSB	88.9 FM	Byhalia, Mississippi
WMSC	90.3 FM	Upper Montclair, New Jersey
WMSD	90.9 FM	Rose Township, Michigan
WMSE	91.7 FM	Milwaukee, Wisconsin
WMSH	90.3 FM	Sparta, Illinois
WMSI-FM	102.9 FM	Jackson, Mississippi
WMSJ	89.3 FM	Freeport, Maine
WMSK-FM	101.3 FM	Sturgis, Kentucky
WMSL	88.9 FM	Athens, Georgia
WMSR-FM	94.9 FM	Collinwood, Tennessee
WMSS	91.1 FM	Middletown, Pennsylvania
WMSU	92.1 FM	Starkville, Mississippi
WMSV	91.1 FM	Starkville, Mississippi
WMTB-FM	89.9 FM	Emmitsburg, Maryland
WMTC-FM	99.9 FM	Vancleve, Kentucky
WMTD-FM	102.3 FM	Hinton, West Virginia
WMTE-FM	101.5 FM	Manistee, Michigan
WMTH	90.5 FM	Park Ridge, Illinois
WMTK	106.3 FM	Littleton, New Hampshire
WMTM-FM	93.9 FM	Moultrie, Georgia
WMTQ	88.1 FM	Elmira, New York
WMTR-FM	96.1 FM	Archbold, Ohio
WMTS-FM	88.3 FM	Murfreesboro, Tennessee
WMTT-FM	94.7 FM	Tioga, Pennsylvania
WMTU-FM	91.9 FM	Houghton, Michigan
WMTX	100.7 FM	Tampa, Florida
WMTY-FM	98.3 FM	Sweetwater, Tennessee
WMUA	91.1 FM	Amherst, Massachusetts
WMUB	88.5 FM	Oxford, Ohio
WMUC-FM	90.5 FM	College Park, Maryland
WMUD	101.5 FM	Brandon, Vermont
WMUH	91.7 FM	Allentown, Pennsylvania
WMUK	102.1 FM	Kalamazoo, Michigan
WMUL	88.1 FM	Huntington, West Virginia
WMUM-FM	89.7 FM	Cochran, Georgia
WMUS	107.9 FM	Muskegon, Michigan
WMUV	100.7 FM	Brunswick, Georgia
WMUW	88.5 FM	Columbus, Mississippi
WMUZ-FM	103.5 FM	Detroit, Michigan
WMVA	88.9 FM	Painter, Virginia
WMVE	90.1 FM	Chase City, Virginia
WMVI	106.7 FM	Mount Vernon, Indiana
WMVL	101.7 FM	Linesville, Pennsylvania
WMVM	90.7 FM	Goodman, Wisconsin
WMVN	100.3 FM	Sylvan Beach, New York
WMVQ	90.5 FM	Fenner, New York
WMVR-FM	105.5 FM	Sidney, Ohio
WMVV	90.7 FM	Griffin, Georgia
WMVW	91.7 FM	Peachtree City, Georgia
WMVY	88.7 FM	Edgartown, Massachusetts
WMWA	96.5 FM	Malone, New York
WMWK	88.1 FM	Milwaukee, Wisconsin
WMWM	91.7 FM	Salem, Massachusetts
WMWV	93.5 FM	Conway, New Hampshire
WMWX	88.9 FM	Miamitown, Ohio
WMXA	96.7 FM	Opelika, Alabama
WMXC	99.9 FM	Mobile, Alabama
WMXD	92.3 FM	Detroit, Michigan
WMXE	100.9 FM	South Charleston, West Virginia
WMXH-FM	105.7 FM	Luray, Virginia
WMXI	98.1 FM	Ellisville, Mississippi
WMXJ	102.7 FM	Pompano Beach, Florida
WMXK	94.1 FM	Morristown, Tennessee
WMXL	94.5 FM	Lexington, Kentucky
WMXM	88.9 FM	Lake Forest, Illinois
WMXN-FM	101.7 FM	Stevenson, Alabama
WMXO	101.5 FM	Olean, New York
WMXQ	93.5 FM	Hartford City, Indiana
WMXS	103.3 FM	Montgomery, Alabama
WMXT	102.1 FM	Pamplico, South Carolina
WMXU	106.1 FM	Starkville, Mississippi
WMXV	101.5 FM	St. Joseph, Tennessee
WMXW	103.3 FM	Vestal, New York
WMXX-FM	103.1 FM	Jackson, Tennessee
WMXY	98.9 FM	Youngstown, Ohio
WMXZ	95.9 FM	Isle of Palms, South Carolina
WMYB	92.1 FM	Myrtle Beach, South Carolina
WMYE	91.9 FM	Fort Myers, Florida
WMYI	102.5 FM	Hendersonville, North Carolina
WMYJ-FM	88.9 FM	Oolitic, Indiana
WMYK	98.5 FM	Peru, Indiana
WMYL	96.7 FM	Halls Crossroads, Tennessee
WMYP	98.3 FM	Frederiksted, Virgin Islands
WMYQ	93.1 FM	Shaw, Mississippi
WMYX-FM	99.1 FM	Milwaukee, Wisconsin
WMYY	97.3 FM	Schoharie, New York
WMYZ	88.7 FM	The Villages, Florida
WMZQ-FM	98.7 FM	Washington, D.C.

== See also ==
- North American call sign
