= 95.9 FM =

FM radio frequency

The following radio stations broadcast on FM frequency 95.9 MHz:

== Argentina ==
- 95.9 Armstrong in Armstrong, Santa Fe
- Blue in Concordia, Entre Ríos
- Caldén in Las Lajas, Neuquén
- Capricornio in Ibarreta, Formosa
- Cielo in Paraná, Entre Ríos
- Del Sol in Formosa
- El Rayo in Viedma, Rio Negro
- Fortaleza in Iguazú, Misiones
- Lider in Quilino, Córdoba
- LRL315 in Buenos Aires
- LRP888 in Pilar, Santa Fe
- Luz in Río Grande, Tierra del Fuego
- Más in Santa Fe de la Vera Cruz, Santa Fe
- Máxima in Rosario, Santa Fe
- Play FM Radio in Córdoba
- Premier in La Leonesa, Chaco
- Radio María in América, Buenos Aires
- Radio María in Azul, Buenos Aires
- Radio María in Chivilcoy, Buenos Aires
- Radio María in Rio Cuarto, Córdoba
- Universo in Vicuña Mackenna, Córdoba
- Vida Tango in Salta
- Vorterix in San Carlos de Bariloche, Río Negro

== Australia ==
- 1233 ABC Newcastle in Port Stephens
- ABC Western Plains in Dubbo, New South Wales
- Triple J in Bathurst, New South Wales
- 3CCS in Apollo Bay, Victoria
- Radio National in Gladstone, Queensland

== Brunei ==
- Pilihan FM (subsidiary of Radio Television Brunei)

== Canada (Channel 240) ==
- CBAF-FM-14 in Sydney, Nova Scotia
- CBMV-FM in Old Fort Bay, Quebec
- CBU-FM-3 in Pemberton, British Columbia
- CFLN-FM-1 in North West River, Newfoundland and Labrador
- CFOB-FM-1 in Atikokan, Ontario
- CFPL-FM in London, Ontario
- CHAP-FM in Chapleau, Ontario
- CHBB-FM in Norris Point, Newfoundland and Labrador
- CHFM-FM in Calgary, Alberta
- CHHI-FM in Miramichi, New Brunswick
- CIAM-FM-16 in Meander River, Alberta
- CIRX-FM-1 in Vanderhoof, British Columbia
- CJFM-FM in Montreal, Quebec
- CJKX-FM in Ajax, Ontario
- CJKX-FM-2 in Toronto, Ontario
- CJWF-FM in Windsor, Ontario
- CKBI-FM in La Ronge, Saskatchewan
- CKMY-FM in Grand Falls-Windsor, Newfoundland and Labrador
- CKSA-FM in Lloydminster, Alberta
- CKUW-FM in Winnipeg, Manitoba
- CKXX-FM-1 in Stephenville, Newfoundland and Labrador
- VF2394 in Moose Jaw, Saskatchewan
- VF2482 in Coal Valley Mine, Alberta
- VF2566 in Barriere, British Columbia

== China ==
- CNR The Voice of China in Ganzhou
- Qingyuan Traffic & Music Radio in Qingyuan

== Dominican Republic ==
- Clave 95.9 in Santiago de los caballeros

== Indonesia ==
- Smart FM in Jakarta, Indonesia
- El John FM in Palembang

== Ireland ==
- Clare FM in southeast Clare

== Lithuania ==
- Power Hit Radio in Vilnius

== Mexico ==
- XHABCJ-FM in Guadalajara, Jalisco
- XHAMB-FM in Tacámbaro, Michoacán
- XHCCAR-FM in Torreón, Coahuila
- XHCJU-FM in Jarretaderas, Nayarit
- XHCOP-FM in Cópala, Jalisco
- XHCSAL-FM in Valladolid, Yucatán
- XHGTO-FM in Guanajuato, Guanajuato
- XHJIQ-FM in Jiquilpan, Michoacán
- XHLIB-FM in Libres, Puebla
- XHPAL-FM in La Paz, Baja California Sur
- XHPBSD-FM in Barrio San Diego (Tlaxiaco), Oaxaca
- XHSCAR-FM in Cadereyta de Montes, Querétaro
- XHVUC-FM in Villa Unión, Coahuila
- XHWD-FM in Ciudad Miguel Alemán, Tamaulipas

== Nigeria ==
- Cool FM 95.9 in Port Harcourt

== Netherlands ==
- SLAM! in the Randstad

== Philippines ==
- DWBG in Baguio City
- DWAL in Batangas City
- DZRB in Naga City
- DYME in Masbate City
- DYJA in Culasi, Antique
- DYIF-FM in Bacolod City
- DYAA in Ubay
- DXPQ in Butuan City

== South Africa ==
- Radio Helderberg in Cape Town
- Kaya FM in Johannesburg

== South Korea ==
- MBC Standard FM in Seoul Metropolitan Area

== United Kingdom ==
- Andover Radio in Andover, Hampshire
- BBC Radio Humberside

== United States (Channel 240) ==
- KBCK in Columbia Falls, Montana
- KBOU in Tok, Alaska
- KBRA in Freer, Texas
- KBYN in Arnold, California
- KCHA in Charles City, Iowa
- KCKH in Mansfield, Missouri
- KCKL in Malakoff, Texas
- KCOB in Newton, Iowa
- KCSC-FM in Woodward, Oklahoma
- KFDG-LP in Las Vegas, Nevada
- KFSH in La Mirada, California
- KFWR in Jacksboro, Texas
- KGVM in Bozeman, Montana
- KHMC in Goliad, Texas
- KIDN-FM in Hayden, Colorado
- KILR in Estherville, Iowa
- KJJZ in Indian Wells, California
- KKBD in Sallisaw, Oklahoma
- KKBL in Monett, Missouri
- KKET in Allakaket, Alaska
- KKFD-FM in Fairfield, Iowa
- KKHI in Kaunakakai, Hawaii
- KKIT in Taos, New Mexico
- KKLD in Cottonwood, Arizona
- KLZX in Weston, Idaho
- KMAR in Winnsboro, Louisiana
- KMPN in Burnet, Texas
- KNIL-LP in Creighton, Nebraska
- KNLF in Quincy, California
- KOCP in Camarillo, California
- KPCN-LP in Woodburn, Oregon
- KPVS in Hilo, Hawaii
- KPWW in Hooks, Texas
- KQCL in Faribault, Minnesota
- KQPZ in Lewistown, Montana
- KRFF-LP in Moorhead, Minnesota
- KRSH in Healdsburg, California
- KRSL-FM in Russell, Kansas
- KRSX in Goldendale, Washington
- KSCH in Sulphur Springs, Texas
- KSLN-LP in Sullivan, Missouri
- KSOK in Winfield, Kansas
- KSRF in Poipu, Hawaii
- KSSR-FM in Santa Rosa, New Mexico
- KTIL-FM in Bay City, Oregon
- KUKY in Wellton, Arizona
- KUUZ in Lake Village, Arkansas
- KWHF in Harrisburg, Arkansas
- KWHK in Hutchinson, Kansas
- KXLR in Fairbanks, Alaska
- KXRG-LP in Honolulu, Hawaii
- KXXZ in Barstow, California
- KYLS-FM in Ironton, Missouri
- KZHK in Saint George, Utah
- KZHM in Alamogordo, New Mexico
- KZLG in Mansura, Louisiana
- KZML in Quincy, Washington
- KZZI in Belle Fourche, South Dakota
- WAKZ in Sharpsville, Pennsylvania
- WAPQ-LP in Avon Park, Florida
- WATD in Marshfield, Massachusetts
- WBBN in Taylorsville, Mississippi
- WBEC in Pittsfield, Massachusetts
- WBKY in Portage, Wisconsin
- WCNA in Potts Camp, Mississippi
- WCQL in Queensbury, New York
- WCRI-FM in Block Island, Rhode Island
- WCVP in Robbinsville, North Carolina
- WDQN-FM in Duquoin, Illinois
- WEBG in Mina, New York
- WEFM (FM) in Michigan City, Indiana
- WERV in Aurora, Illinois
- WEZC in Clinton, Illinois
- WFDM in Franklin, Indiana
- WFOG-LP in Hillsville, Virginia
- WFTM in Maysville, Kentucky
- WGKY in Wickliffe, Kentucky
- WGRL-LP in Saint Cloud, Florida
- WGRQ in Fairview Beach, Virginia
- WHLR in Seelyville, Indiana
- WICC-FM in Southport, Connecticut
- WICL in Williamsport, Maryland
- WIQI in Watseka, Illinois
- WJIH-LP in Oneonta, New York
- WJKW (FM) in Athens, Ohio
- WJRN-LP in Summerfield, Florida
- WKBP in Benton, Pennsylvania
- WKID in Vevay, Indiana
- WKRI-LP in Richmond, Kentucky
- WKSZ in De Pere, Wisconsin
- WKTZ-FM in Loch Lynn Heights, Maryland
- WKUZ in Wabash, Indiana
- WKZP in West Ocean City, Maryland
- WLJW-FM in Fife Lake, Michigan
- WLKM in Three Rivers, Michigan
- WLKX-FM in Forest Lake, Minnesota
- WLQK in Livingston, Tennessee
- WMQA in Minocqua, Wisconsin
- WMSZ-LP in Hartsville, South Carolina
- WMXZ in Isle of Palms, South Carolina
- WNJI-LP in Kearny, New Jersey
- WNLF in Macomb, Illinois
- WNPQ in New Philadelphia, Ohio
- WOLG in Carlinville, Illinois
- WOPT-LP in Waynesville, North Carolina
- WOVU-LP in Cleveland, Ohio
- WOXI-LP in Oxford, Alabama
- WPEI in Saco, Maine
- WPLS-LP in Greenville, South Carolina
- WPNC-FM in Plymouth, North Carolina
- WQQP in Sykesville, Pennsylvania
- WQZY in Dublin, Georgia
- WRAT in Point Pleasant, New Jersey
- WRBA in Springfield, Florida
- WRJB in Camden, Tennessee
- WROK-FM in Sebastian, Florida
- WRZK in Colonial Heights, Tennessee
- WSTG in Princeton, West Virginia
- WTGZ in Tuskegee, Alabama
- WTWX in Guntersville, Alabama
- WULC-LP in Hendersonville, North Carolina
- WVFV-LP in Roanoke Rapids, North Carolina
- WVOS in Liberty, New York
- WWIN in Glen Burnie, Maryland
- WWWI in Pillager, Minnesota
- WYNE-LP in Wayne, New Jersey
- WYNT in Caledonia, Ohio
- WZYE-LP in Maplewood, New Jersey
