= WKXM =

WKXM may refer to:

- WKXM-FM, a radio station (97.7 FM) licensed to Winfield, Alabama, United States
- WKXM (AM), a defunct radio station (1300 AM) formerly licensed to Winfield, Alabama
