= WFOG =

WFOG may refer to:

- WFOG-LP, a low power radio station (95.9 FM) licensed to Hillsville, Virginia
- WDRE (AM), a radio station (1570 AM) licensed to Riverhead, New York, which used the WFOG call sign from 1999 to 2001, and again in 2024
- WTWV-FM, a radio station (92.9 FM) licensed to Suffolk, Virginia, which used the WFOG call sign from 1970 to 1999, and again from 2003 to 2005
