= WKRI =

WKRI may refer to:

- WKRI-LP, a low-power radio station (95.9 FM) licensed to serve Richmond, Kentucky, United States
- WHRT-FM, a radio station (91.9 FM) licensed to sere Cokesbury, South Carolina, United States, which held the call sign WKRI from 2008 to 2014
- WWRI, a radio station (1450 AM) licensed to serve West Warwick, Rhode Island, United States, licensed as WKRI from 1973 to 1995
- WKRK-FM, a radio station (92.3 FM) licensed to serve Cleveland Heights, Ohio, United States, licensed as WKRI from May to October 2007
