= WFPA =

WFPA may refer to:

- WFPA (AM), a radio station (1400 AM) licensed to Fort Payne, Alabama, United States
- WFPA-CD, a television station (channel 35, virtual 28) licensed to Philadelphia, Pennsylvania, United States
