= WFBA (disambiguation) =

WFBA is a radio station (90.5 FM) licensed to Kulpmont, Pennsylvania.

WKFX may also refer to:

- WPLS-LP, a radio station (95.9 FM) licensed to Greenville, South Carolina, which held the call sign WFBA in the 1960s
- WLRP, a radio station (1460 AM) licensed to San Sebastián, Puerto Rico, which held the call sign WFBA from 1965 to 1982
- WMYM, a radio station (990 AM) licensed to Kendall, Florida, which held the call sign WKFX from 1997 to 1999
- WGSX, a radio station (104.3 FM) licensed to Lynn Haven, Florida, which held the call sign WFBA from July to August 2011
