= WLSW =

WLSW may refer to:

- WLSW (FM), a radio station (103.1 FM) licensed to serve Scottdale, Pennsylvania, United States
- WLDW, a radio station (105.5 FM) licensed to serve Salisbury, Maryland, United States, which held the call sign WLSW from 2019 to 2024
