= WIKI (FM) =

- Carrollton, Kentucky; United States
- Broadcast area: Madison, Indiana
- Frequency: 95.3 MHz
- Branding: WIKI Country

Programming
- Format: Country music
- Affiliations: Fox News Radio

Ownership
- Owner: Wagon Wheel Broadcasting, LLC
- Sister stations: WSCH

History
- First air date: April 1968
- Former call signs: WVCM (1968–1980)

Technical information
- Licensing authority: FCC
- Facility ID: 72388
- Class: A
- ERP: 1,800 watts
- HAAT: 129.0 meters (423.2 ft)
- Transmitter coordinates: 38°39′58″N 85°16′51″W

Links
- Public license information: Public file; LMS
- Webcast: Listen live
- Website: 953wiki.com

WIKI (95.3 FM) is a country music–formatted radio station licensed to Carrollton, Kentucky, United States, serving Madison, Indiana. The station is currently owned by Wagon Wheel Broadcasting, LLC. WIKI maintains studios on Clifty Drive in northern Madison, while its transmitter is located along Culls Ridge Road in rural eastern Trimble County, Kentucky west of Carrollton.

== History ==
WIKI went on-the-air in April 1968 under the call letters WVCM (Welcome Voice of Country Music). The station was launched by a group of local investors under the leadership of Dwight Moreillon and Charlie Cutler. WVCM would gain a sister station in 1974 when two would sign-on another station in nearby Vevay, Indiana: WKID (95.9 FM). The two are no longer co-owned.

In 1979, WVCM was purchased by Robert Doan, who took the station off-air and worked on technical upgrades. The next year, the station re-launched as WIKI with an adult contemporary format. George Freeman would purchase the station in 1984, flipping the station back to country music. In 1993, WIKI changed frequencies to 95.3 MHz after its ownership got the allotment relocated from Falmouth, Kentucky.

Previous logo
