= WGES =

WGES may refer to:

- WGES (AM), a radio station (680 AM) licensed to St. Petersburg, Florida, United States
- WGES-FM, a radio station (90.9 FM) licensed to Key Largo, Florida, United States
