= Power Hit Radio =

Power Hit Radio may refer to:

- Power Hit Radio (Estonia)
- Power Hit Radio (Lithuania)
- Power Hit Radio (Norway)
- Power Hit Radio (Sweden)
