= KUKY =

Radio station in Wellton, Arizona, United States

- Wellton, Arizona; United States
- Broadcast area: Yuma, Arizona
- Frequency: 95.9 MHz
- Branding: Radio Amigo

Programming
- Format: Regional Mexican

Ownership
- Owner: Hispanic Target Media, Inc.

History
- First air date: 2009

Technical information
- Licensing authority: FCC
- Facility ID: 162388
- Class: C3
- ERP: 1,600 watts
- HAAT: 385 meters (1,263 ft)
- Transmitter coordinates: 32°40′22″N 114°20′11″W

Links
- Public license information: Public file; LMS
- Website: amigo959fm.com

KUKY (95.9 FM) is a Spanish language radio station licensed to Wellton, Arizona. The station airs a Regional Mexican format, and is owned by Hispanic Target Media, Inc.
