= WFPA (AM) =

Radio station in Fort Payne, Alabama

- Fort Payne, Alabama; United States
- Broadcast area: NE Alabama, NW Georgia, and SW Tennessee
- Frequency: 1400 kHz
- Branding: NewsTalk 1400 WFPA

Programming
- Format: News/talk
- Affiliations: Fox News Radio; Talk Radio Network

Ownership
- Owner: Southern Torch Media
- Sister stations: WKEA-FM; WMXN-FM

History
- First air date: January 8, 1950
- Last air date: August 7, 2023
- Former call signs: WFPA (1950–1997); WMXN (1997–1999); WDLL (1999–2002)
- Call sign meaning: Fort Payne, Alabama

Technical information
- Facility ID: 33782
- Class: C
- Power: 1,000 watts (unlimited)
- Transmitter coordinates: 34°26′22.3″N 85°42′10.9″W
- Translator: (93.9 MHz) W230CX (Fort Payne)

WFPA (1400 AM, "NewsTalk 1400") was a radio station in Fort Payne, Alabama. The station, which broadcast from 1950 to 2023, was owned and operated by Southern Torch Media, located in Rainsville, Alabama. It aired in a news/talk format.

== History ==
WFPA began broadcasting on January 8, 1950, as the first radio station in Fort Payne and DeKalb County. The owner was James Louis Killian. Killian sold WFPA to its general manager, George A. Gothberg, Jr., for $15,000 two years later; Gothberg, a resident of Cleveland, began operating the station 24 hours, unusual for that time in such a small market. In 1953, WFPA dropped its commercial programming for several hours in order to hold a fundraiser to buy the Fort Payne Fire Department a resuscitator. The station was a country music outlet known as "Radio Ranch" and did not air newscasts, unusual in that era.

The station suffered the first serious challenge to its existence four years after signing on the air. In 1954, the Federal Communications Commission (FCC) advised Gothberg that the license renewal application would be designated for a hearing. An examiner recommended denial of the station's renewal in 1955 because Gothberg had failed to disclose to the FCC that his father had provided some of the funds to buy WFPA. Gothberg appealed, and the commission found that the inconsistencies between his statements to the FCC and to a divorce court did not disqualify him, renewing the license. WFPA's religious director, the Rev. C. E. Dean, suffered a fatal heart attack on the air while hosting his program in 1959.

In 1962, Gothberg sold WFPA to clothing store owner Robert H. Johnson for $33,000. Two years later, Johnson was approved to increase WFPA's day power from 250 to 1,000 watts. Night power remained 250 watts. Johnson transferred the station in 1971 to WFPA, Inc., a corporation he owned; he would retain it until selling WFPA in 1979 to C. Albert Dick and his son James A. Dick of Chattanooga, Tennessee, for $360,000. Five years later, however, the Dicks went bankrupt and WFPA fell silent; as forgiveness for an unpaid note, Johnson, his wife Beatrice, and their daughter bought back the station. Robert Johnson died later that year, leaving the others to sell WFPA to the Fort Payne Broadcasting Company for $350,000 in 1985. In 1987, it was added to the Radio & Records adult contemporary reporting panel. The Watts family, owners of Fort Payne Broadcasting, sold the station to PEPA Communications in 1990 for $200,000; however, WFPA, now an oldies outlet, sold for just $34,650 four years later to KEA Radio.

In the late 1990s and early 2000s, WFPA changed its call letters twice, to WMXN in 1997 and WDLL in 1999 (after being sold to the Delgiorno Broadcasting Corporation), before returning to the original WFPA in 2002 in the wake of a $112,000 sale to DeKalb County Community Radio. WFPA would then be sold to J.A.R. Services in 2006 and to the Wallace Broadcasting Corporation in 2010.

On October 18, 2019, while WFPA was in the middle of its local morning show, it was served with an eviction notice by its landlord for failing to pay rent. Less than six hours later, the WFPA broadcast tower had been dismantled. Southern Torch, the owner of two radio stations in nearby Scottsboro and Stevenson, filed to buy WFPA from Wallace in 2020; at that time, the station was operating from a temporary longwire antenna. Southern Torch took WFPA silent on August 7, 2023, noting the considerable costs involved in restoring licensed operation and opting to "conserve economic resources" instead of continuing the longwire antenna. It never returned to the air; Southern Torch surrendered the license on October 25, 2024, shortly after the FCC had determined that the station had not returned to the air in a year and demanded proof of resumption of operations to avoid automatic license expiration. The FCC cancelled the WFPA license on November 4, 2024.

== Programming ==
WFPA primarily broadcast syndicated conservative talk programming from Fox News Radio and Talk Radio Network Hosts included Jerry Doyle, Michael Savage, Gary Sullivan, Brian Kilmeade, and Rusty Humphries. The station also broadcast Alabama Crimson Tide sports.
