= WKLG =

- Rock Harbor, Florida; United States
- Broadcast area: Florida Keys area
- Frequency: 102.1 MHz
- Branding: Star 102.1

Programming
- Format: Adult contemporary

Ownership
- Owner: WKLG, Inc.

History
- Call sign meaning: Key LarGo

Technical information
- Licensing authority: FCC
- Facility ID: 73177
- Class: C1
- ERP: 100,000 watts
- HAAT: 131 meters
- Transmitter coordinates: 25°5′29.00″N 80°26′37.00″W

Links
- Public license information: Public file; LMS

WKLG (102.1 FM, "Star 102.1") is a radio station broadcasting an adult contemporary music format. Licensed to Rock Harbor, Florida, the station serves the upper Florida Keys and southern Miami-Dade area. The station is currently owned by WKLG, Inc.
