= WSKX =

- Christiansted, U.S. Virgin Islands; United States
- Broadcast area: U.S. Virgin Islands
- Frequency: 90.7 MHz
- Branding: Tropix 90.7

Programming
- Format: Reggae/Soca

Ownership
- Owner: VI Radio, LLC; (Better Communication Group, Inc.)
- Sister stations: WVVI-FM; WVIQ; WJKC; WMYP; WMNG

History
- First air date: July 27, 2009
- Former call signs: WXZT (2009-2014)

Technical information
- Licensing authority: FCC
- Facility ID: 176578
- Class: B
- ERP: 10,000 watts
- HAAT: 238 meters
- Transmitter coordinates: 17°44′7″N 64°40′46″W

Links
- Public license information: Public file; LMS
- Webcast: Listen Live
- Website: www.viradio.com

WSKX (90.7 FM) is a radio station broadcasting a reggae and soca music format. Licensed to Christiansted, U.S. Virgin Islands, the station is currently owned by Better Communication Group.
