= WVVI-FM =

Radio station in Christiansted, U.S. Virgin Islands

- Christiansted, U.S. Virgin Islands; United States
- Frequency: 93.5 MHz
- Branding: Caribbean Country

Programming
- Format: Country
- Affiliations: CBS Radio News

Ownership
- Owner: Philip E. Kuhlman and Ellen N. Kuhlman, Joint Tenants (operated under a leasing agreement by JKC Communications); (RWave, Inc.)
- Sister stations: WJKC; WMYP; WVIQ; WSKX; WMNG

History
- First air date: July 19, 1988
- Former call signs: WAVI (1988-1999); WYAC (1999-2003); WYAC-FM (2003-2008)
- Call sign meaning: Voice of the Virgin; Islands

Technical information
- Licensing authority: FCC
- Facility ID: 62114
- Class: B1
- ERP: 9,600 Watts
- HAAT: 246 meters (808 feet)
- Transmitter coordinates: 17°43′53″N 64°41′17″W

Links
- Public license information: Public file; LMS
- Webcast: Listen Live

WVVI-FM (93.5 FM) is a radio station licensed to serve Christiansted, U.S. Virgin Islands. The station is owned by Philip E. Kuhlman and Ellen N. Kuhlman as joint tenants. The station is operated by JKC Communications under a leasing agreement. WVVI-FM has been airing the current country format since 2011.

== History ==
The station's former logo as WYAC

The Federal Communications Commission assigned WAVI as the call letters for this station on July 19, 1988. There were switched to WYAC on February 15, 1999 which they remained until WYAC signed on from San Juan, Puerto Rico, forcing a modification. The station operated under the WYAC-FM call letters from October 24, 2003 to October 13, 2008, when it changed to the current WVVI-FM.

== Ownership ==
In June 2004, Philip E. and Ellen N. Kuhlman acquired WYAC-FM from El Morro Broadcasting Inc. (Luis A. Mejia, president) for a reported sale price of $300,000.

In January 2007, Rain Broadcasting Inc. (Roger Morgan, president) announced it was buying WYAC-FM from Philip E. and Ellen N. Kuhlman for $375,000.

In December 2007, the FCC dismissed a bid by a coalition of Virgin Islands senators and citizens to deny the transfer of the WYAC-FM broadcasting license from its current owners, Philip and Ellen Kuhlman, to the station's lessee, Roger W. Morgan. The station has been leased by Morgan's company, Rain Broadcasting, Inc., for almost four years. However, the FCC ruled that the Kuhlmans had failed to properly monitor the management of the station under Morgan's lease. Under a consent decree, the Kuhlmans agreed to pay $15,000 and Morgan agreed to pay $8,000 to the U.S. government.
