= WVIQ =

- Christiansted, U.S. Virgin Islands; United States
- Broadcast area: St. Croix, St. Thomas, St. John, British Virgin Islands & eastern Puerto Rico
- Frequency: 99.5 MHz
- Branding: Sunny 99.5

Programming
- Format: Adult contemporary
- Affiliations: ABC Radio News

Ownership
- Owner: JKC Communications; (JKC Communications of the Virgin Islands, Inc.)
- Sister stations: WVVI-FM; WJKC; WMYP; WSKX; WMNG

History
- First air date: October 27, 1964
- Former call signs: WIVI-FM (1964-1987)
- Call sign meaning: "Virgin Islands Quality"

Technical information
- Licensing authority: FCC
- Facility ID: 74457
- Class: B
- ERP: 32,000 watts
- HAAT: 225 meters (738 ft)
- Transmitter coordinates: 17°44′7″N 64°40′46″W

Links
- Public license information: Public file; LMS
- Webcast: TuneIn (Primary); Aiir (Secondary)
- Website: http://www.viradio.com

WVIQ (99.5 FM) is a radio station licensed to serve Christiansted, U.S. Virgin Islands. The station is owned by JKC Communications of the Virgin Islands, Inc. It airs an adult contemporary music format.

This station was assigned the call sign WIVI-FM by the Federal Communications Commission on October 2, 1978, which it held until switching to the current WVIQ call letters on July 5, 1987.
