= WBUV =

- Moss Point, Mississippi; United States
- Broadcast area: Gulfport-Biloxi-Pascagoula
- Frequency: 104.9 MHz
- Branding: News Talk 104.9 FM

Programming
- Language: English
- Format: Conservative talk
- Affiliations: Fox News Radio; Fox Sports Radio; Premiere Networks; Westwood One

Ownership
- Owner: iHeartMedia, Inc.; (iHM Licenses, LLC)
- Sister stations: WKNN-FM, WMJY, WQYZ

History
- First air date: June 1, 1964
- Former call signs: WACY-FM (1964–1967); WCIS-FM (1967–1978); WKKY (1978–1991); WUNI (1991); WZBA (1991–1995); WYOK (1995–1999); WDWG (1999–2001); WBUB-FM (2001–2003)
- Call sign meaning: "Bubba"

Technical information
- Licensing authority: FCC
- Facility ID: 29687
- Class: C2
- ERP: 16,000 watts
- HAAT: 268 meters (879 ft)
- Transmitter coordinates: 30°29′09.70″N 88°42′53.10″W

Links
- Public license information: Public file; LMS
- Webcast: Listen live (via iHeartRadio)
- Website: newstalk1049.iheart.com

WBUV (104.9 FM, "News Radio 104.9 FM") is a commercial radio station licensed to Moss Point, Mississippi, United States, and serving the Gulfport–Biloxi-Pascagoula radio market. Owned by iHeartMedia, the station broadcasts a conservative talk format. The studios and offices are on DeBuys Road in Biloxi.

WBUV's transmitter is located off Mississippi State Highway 57 in Vancleave.

== History ==
The station first signed on the air on June 1, 1964. It was a country music station, WBUB, based in Mobile, Alabama. In 1998, the station was acquired by Clear Channel Communications (forerunner to today's iHeartMedia). Clear Channel moved the signal to the Biloxi-Gulfport-Pascagoula market.

It became WBUV, which started as an urban contemporary outlet known as "V104.9." The station played Hip Hop, R&B, and on Sundays, Urban Gospel. The station also hosted the nationally syndicated Doug Banks Morning Show and later the Russ Parr Morning Show. The station competed with WJZD (Gulfport, Mississippi) and WBLX (Mobile, Alabama) in the Alabama/Mississippi Gulf Coast's urban contemporary market.

Following Hurricane Katrina in 2005, the station began to broadcast 24-hour news and information to keep the community up-to-date on the storm recovery efforts. That prompted iHeartMedia to continue the talk format even after most communities had returned to normal. The station has risen to be one of the top-ranked stations along the Coast.

Since Hurricane Katrina, the station has undergone various talk show host changes. Kipp Gregory left the station in 2012 and moved to FM 103.1. He was replaced by Steve Taylor and Mike Mankiewicz. Shortly after Kipp left, the Michael Savage show, Clark Howard, and Todd Schnitt were removed from the lineup. New programs at the time were Sean Hannity and Andy Dean. The Andy Dean Show was removed after one year in 2014 and replaced with the Joe Pags show from 5-8 pm, followed by the 8-11 pm Mark Levin show introduced during the winter of 2014-15. Joe Pags last show on 104.9 was in July 2015 when it was replaced with the Megan McCain show.

In August 2018, Steve Taylor and Mike Mankiewicz departed the show for the station as the local Gulfcoast Morning Show came to an end. It replaced by Gordon Deal and America's First News. The station now has syndicated shows all day on weekdays, with local inserts of Gulf-area news and weather.

== Programming ==
WBUV's weekday schedule consists of nationally syndicated conservative talk shows. WBUV also carries Southern Miss Football and New Orleans Pelicans basketball.
