= XHWD-FM =

Radio station in Ciudad Miguel Alemán, Tamaulipas

- Ciudad Miguel Alemán, Tamaulipas; Mexico
- Frequency: 95.9 FM (HD Radio)
- Branding: La Pistolera

Programming
- Format: Regional Mexican

Ownership
- Owner: Radio Fronterizo El Heraldo, S.A. de C.V.
- Operator: Pistolera Promotions

History
- First air date: January 22, 1953 (concession)

Technical information
- Licensing authority: CRT
- Class: A
- ERP: 3 kW
- HAAT: 20.8 m (68 ft)

Links
- Website: lapistolera.com

XHWD-FM is a radio station on 95.9 FM located in Ciudad Miguel Alemán, Tamaulipas. It is owned by Radio Fronterizo El Heraldo and known as La Pistolera, which offers a Regional Mexican format.

== History ==
Logo as "Radio X"

XEWD-AM received its concession on January 22, 1953. Initially operating with 2,000 watts during the day, XEWD has never changed concessionaires in its history.

It migrated to FM as XHWD-FM 95.9 in 2019. At that time, the station was being operated by Grupo GAPE. In November 2019, La Pistolera, a Regional Mexican format that had originally been broadcasting from KRGX 95.1 across the border in Rio Grande City, Texas in the United States, was moved from KRGX to XHWD.
