= WLBW =

- Fenwick Island, Delaware; United States
- Broadcast area: Ocean City, Maryland
- Frequency: 92.1 MHz

Programming
- Format: Contemporary Christian
- Network: K-Love

Ownership
- Owner: Educational Media Foundation

History
- First air date: April 1, 1994
- Call sign meaning: Former simulcaster of WLVW in Salisbury, Maryland

Technical information
- Licensing authority: FCC
- Facility ID: 28170
- Class: A
- ERP: 3 kW
- HAAT: 143 m (469 ft)
- Transmitter coordinates: 38°25′20″N 75°8′23″W

Links
- Public license information: Public file; LMS

WLBW is a radio station in the Fenwick Island / Ocean City area of Delaware and Maryland and broadcasting at 92.1 MHz. The station plays a contemporary Christian music format as part of the K-Love network. The station is owned by the Educational Media Foundation.

== History ==
HVS Partners acquired the construction permit for WADD before it went to air, changed the call letters to WLBW, and signed the station on with an oldies format known as "The Wave" on April 1, 1994, simulcasting WLVW-FM in Salisbury, Maryland. The move allowed WLVW's oldies format to expand its reach. HVS Partners sold its stations in the Ocean City-Salisbury market to Cumulus Broadcasting in 1997—including WLBW, three additional FM outlets and an AM station—in a $9.2 million transaction; earlier in the year, Cumulus had entered into a local marketing agreement to run them.

Clear Channel Communications acquired WLBW, WLVW-FM, and the other Cumulus Ocean City stations in 2000, amid financial problems at Cumulus. Clear Channel would flip WLVW-FM to contemporary hit radio in 2004 as WDKZ, breaking the two-station simulcast, with WLBW retaining the oldies format. After a private equity buyout by Bain Capital in 2007, Clear Channel was required to spin off stations from a series of grandfathered clusters, including the Salisbury–Ocean City market, due to ownership limits; it chose to place WLBW and WDKZ in the Aloha Station Trust. The trust sold both stations to EMF in November 2010 for $400,000.
