= WJKC =

Radio station in Christiansted, U.S. Virgin Islands

- Christiansted; United States Virgin Islands
- Broadcast area: Charlotte Amalie
- Frequency: 95.1 MHz
- Branding: Isle 95

Programming
- Format: Urban contemporary/hip hop/reggae

Ownership
- Owner: JKC Communications; (Radio 95, Incorporated)
- Sister stations: WMNG, WMYP, WSKX, WVIQ, WVVI-FM

History
- First air date: October 12, 1983
- Call sign meaning: Jonathan K. Cohen (station owner)

Technical information
- Licensing authority: FCC
- Facility ID: 54468
- Class: B
- ERP: 50,000 watts
- HAAT: 241 meters (791 feet)
- Transmitter coordinates: 17°44′7″N 64°40′46″W

Links
- Public license information: Public file; LMS
- Webcast: Listen live
- Website: www.isle95.com

WJKC (95.1 FM) is a radio station licensed to serve Christiansted, U.S. Virgin Islands. The station is owned by Radio 95, Incorporated. It airs an urban contemporary/hip hop/reggae format.

WJKC's programming is simulcast on ZJKC-FM (90.9 FM) in the British Virgin Islands.

The station has been assigned the WJKC call letters by the Federal Communications Commission since October 12, 1983.

== Programming ==
Along with its usual music programming, one unusual feature of WJKC is a twice-weekly call-in program offering "free on-air psychic readings with Miss Lynn."
