= WQYZ =

Radio station in Biloxi, Mississippi

- Ocean Springs, Mississippi; United States
- Broadcast area: Biloxi–Gulfport, Mississippi
- Frequency: 92.5 MHz
- Branding: Rock 92.5

Programming
- Language: English
- Format: Classic rock

Ownership
- Owner: iHeartMedia, Inc.; (iHM Licenses, LLC)
- Sister stations: WBUV, WKNN-FM, WMJY

History
- First air date: September 1, 1992; 33 years ago
- Former call signs: WWXX (1992–1994); WXOR (1994–1998)

Technical information
- Licensing authority: FCC
- Facility ID: 24513
- Class: A
- ERP: 6,000 watts
- HAAT: 98 meters (322 feet)
- Transmitter coordinates: 30°27′09.70″N 88°51′21.10″W

Links
- Public license information: Public file; LMS
- Webcast: Listen live (via iHeartRadio)
- Website: 925rocks.iheart.com

WQYZ (92.5 MHz "Rock 92.5") is a commercial radio station licensed to Ocean Springs, Mississippi, and serving the Biloxi-Gulfport radio market. It airs a classic rock format and is owned by iHeartMedia, Inc. Core artists include AC/DC, Metallica, Pearl Jam and Van Halen. WQYZ is the Biloxi-Gulfport affiliate for Walton & Johnson, a syndicated morning show from sister station KPRC (AM) in Houston.

WQYZ has an effective radiated power (ERP) of 6,000 watts as a Class A FM station. Its transmitter is off Big Ridge Road in St. Martin, Mississippi, near Interstate 10.

== History ==
On September 1, 1992, the station signed on as WWXX. It was owned by Golden Gulf Coast Broadcasting with its studios and offices in Biloxi. It later switched to the call sign WXOR as a Contemporary Christian music station. In 1998, the call letters were changed to WQYZ with an urban adult contemporary format.

On October 25, 2017, at 7 pm, WQYZ dropped its urban AC format (branded as "92.5 The Beat") and began stunting as "Roulette Radio." On October 31, WQYZ flipped to classic rock, branded as "Rock 92.5". In 2022, WQYZ dropped Rover's Morning Glory for the Walton & Johnson morning show.
