= XHPAL-FM =

Radio station in La Paz, Baja California Sur, Mexico

- La Paz, Baja California Sur; Mexico
- Frequency: 95.9 MHz
- Branding: Digimix 95

Programming
- Format: Classic hits

Ownership
- Owner: Promomedios California; (José María Espinoza Piedrín)

History
- First air date: February 26, 1996 (concession)
- Call sign meaning: Anagram of La PAz

Technical information
- Licensing authority: CRT
- Class: B1
- ERP: 9.8 kW
- HAAT: 103.1 m (338 ft)
- Transmitter coordinates: 24°07′53″N 110°16′39″W

Links
- Webcast: Listen live
- Website: digimix95.com

XHPAL-FM is a radio station in La Paz, Baja California Sur, Mexico, broadcasting on the frequency of 95.9 MHz.
