= WMJY =

- Biloxi, Mississippi; United States
- Broadcast area: Gulfport-Biloxi-Pascagoula metropolitan area
- Frequency: 93.7 MHz
- Branding: Magic 93.7

Programming
- Language: English
- Format: Adult contemporary
- Affiliations: Premiere Networks

Ownership
- Owner: iHeartMedia, Inc.; (iHM Licenses, LLC)
- Sister stations: WBUV, WKNN-FM, WQYZ

History
- First air date: July 11, 1966
- Former call signs: WVMI-FM (1966–1969); WQID (1969–1994)
- Former frequencies: 106.3 MHz
- Call sign meaning: "Magic"

Technical information
- Licensing authority: FCC
- Facility ID: 61368
- Class: C
- ERP: 100,000 watts (horiz.); 98,300 watts (vert.)
- HAAT: 300 meters (980 ft)
- Transmitter coordinates: 30°29′09.70″N 88°42′53.10″W

Links
- Public license information: Public file; LMS
- Webcast: Listen live (via iHeartRadio)
- Website: magic937.iheart.com

WMJY (93.7 FM, "Magic 93.7") is a commercial radio station licensed to Biloxi, Mississippi, United States, and serving the Biloxi-Gulfport-Pascagoula market. The station is owned by iHeartMedia, Inc., and it broadcasts an adult contemporary format with studios are on Debuys Road in Biloxi.

WMJY's transmitter is located off Mississippi Highway 57 in Vancleave. The signal covers an area from Mobile in the east to the suburbs of New Orleans in the west.

== History ==
The station signed on the air on July 11, 1966. Its call sign was WVMI-FM and it was owned by New South Communications, along with WVMI 570 AM (now defunct). WVMI-FM's original frequency was 106.3 MHz, powered at 3,000 watts, a fraction of its current output. It later moved to 93.7 MHz, coupled with a power increase, allowing it to be heard across numerous Gulf Coast cities. Its call letters were changed to WQID.

In the 1970s and 80s, WQID was a popular Top 40 station, with a large following among youthful listeners. A series of ownership changes and format flips ensued and WQID found itself in a ratings slump in the early 1990s. Starr Broadcasting bought WQID along with AM sister station WVMI in 1994 and changed the FM station's format to Soft AC as WMJY, Magic 93.7. The station has been a long-time ratings leader with adults along the Gulf Coast.

Multi-Market Radio bought out Starr Broadcasting in 1994. Multi-Market Radio was acquired by Clear Channel Communications in 2001. In 2014, Clear Channel changed its name to iHeartMedia, the current owner.
