= WMVW =

Simulcasts WMVV Griffin
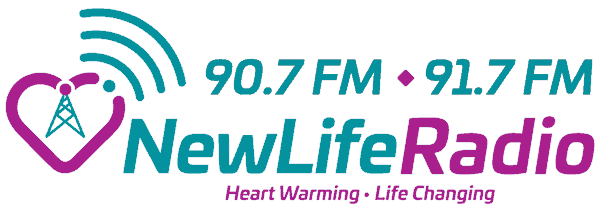
- Peachtree City, Georgia; United States
- Broadcast area: Atlanta metro area (south)
- Frequency: 91.7 MHz
- Branding: New Life FM

Programming
- Format: Christian talk and teaching
- Affiliations: SRN News

Ownership
- Owner: Life Radio Ministries
- Sister stations: WMVV

History
- First air date: 2010
- Call sign meaning: sister station to WMVV

Technical information
- Licensing authority: FCC
- Facility ID: 86333
- Class: C3
- ERP: 13,000 watts
- HAAT: 75 metres (246 feet)
- Transmitter coordinates: 33°14′39″N 84°25′49″W

Links
- Public license information: Public file; LMS
- Webcast: Listen Live
- Website: wmvv.com

WMVW (91.7 FM) is a non-commercial Christian radio station having Peachtree City, Georgia as its city of license. WMVW airs a format consisting of Christian talk and teaching programs as well as Christian music. Programs heard on WMVW include Running to Win with Erwin Lutzer, Turning Point with David Jeremiah, Focus On The Family, and Revive Our Hearts with Nancy DeMoss Wolgemuth.

The station came on the air in early 2010 as part of the American Family Radio network. It is a counterpart to WMVV FM 90.7 in nearby Griffin, Georgia, both of which are on the southern edge of metro Atlanta, and are part of its media market. The station's original application dates back to 1997, and its construction permit was finally issued a decade later in 2007, superseding two issued in 2005. It requested and received a modification of the permit in 2009, and in May 2010 requested and was finally issued its broadcast license.
