= Mars Hill Network =

Christian radio network in upstate New York

WMHR
Mars Hill Network Flagship Station
- Syracuse, New York; United States
- Broadcast area: Northern New York; Eastern Ontario
- Frequency: 102.9 MHz
- Branding: Mars Hill Network

Programming
- Format: Christian radio
- Network: SRN News
- Affiliations: Salem Radio Network; Moody Radio

Ownership
- Owner: Mars Hill Broadcasting Co. Inc.

History
- First air date: March 9, 1969
- Call sign meaning: "Mars Hill Radio"

Technical information
- Licensing authority: FCC
- Facility ID: 40432
- Class: B
- ERP: 20,000 watts
- HAAT: 239 meters (784 ft)
- Transmitter coordinates: 42°58′1.2″N 76°11′58.7″W
- Translator: See § Translators
- Repeater: See § Repeaters

Links
- Public license information: Public file; LMS
- Website: www.marshillnetwork.org

The Mars Hill Network is a network of Christian radio stations in Northern New York, also serving parts of Ontario and Quebec, Canada. The network features a mix of Christian talk and teaching shows and blocks of Christian music. It first began broadcasting on March 9, 1969.

Its flagship station is WMHR (102.9 FM) in Syracuse, New York. All stations are non-commercial and are listener-supported, seeking donations on the air and on its website. The studios and offices are on Makyers Road in Syracuse.

== Programming ==
The Mars Hill Network airs both local and national religious programs. Programs are hosted by James Dobson, Jim Daly, John MacArthur, Erwin Lutzer, Adrian Rogers, J. Vernon McGee, Alistair Begg and Charles Stanley. Updates are provided by SRN News.

== History ==
The first station, WMHR 102.9 FM in Syracuse, went on the air in 1969. In 1988, WMHN 89.3 FM in Webster, New York, began broadcasting as the network's second station. It serves the Rochester metropolitan area.

In 1991, a station near the Canada–United States border joined the network. WMHI 94.7 FM in Cape Vincent, New York, began serving Jefferson County, near Kingston, Ontario. WMHQ 90.1 FM in Malone, New York, signed on in 2003, serving Franklin County near the border of Quebec.

WMHU 91.1 FM, in Cold Brook, New York, signed on in 2011, serving Herkimer County. Two stations joined the network in 2019: WMHY 88.5 FM, in Richfield Springs, New York, serving Otsego County. WMHH 96.7 FM, in Clifton Park, New York, flipped from its previous format as an oldies station. It serves Albany and the Capital District.

In addition to full-power stations, the network is heard on more than a dozen low-power FM translator stations around New York State, including one on Eastern Long Island.

== Other stations ==
=== Repeaters ===
Call sign	Frequency	City of license	FID	Class	ERP (W)	Height (m (ft))	Transmitter coordinates
WMHI	94.7 FM	Cape Vincent, New York	40435	A	5,800	101 m (331 ft)	44°4′42.2″N 76°15′24.8″W
WMHH	96.7 FM	Clifton Park, New York	30571	A	4,700	100 m (330 ft)	42°52′44.3″N 73°51′45.4″W
WMHU	91.1 FM	Cold Brook, New York	174468	A	380	227 m (745 ft)	43°8′30.2″N 75°2′20.5″W
WMHQ	90.1 FM	Malone, New York	89863	A	2,700	108 m (354 ft)	44°49′41.2″N 74°22′41.6″W
WMHY	88.5 FM	Richfield Springs, New York	174409	A	610	116 m (381 ft)	42°55′11.2″N 74°57′0.5″W
WMHN	89.3 FM	Webster, New York	40430	A	1,000	44 m (144 ft)	43°13′45.2″N 77°26′50.9″W

All call sign meanings are a variation of "Mars Hill".

=== Translators ===
In addition to the main stations, there are 15 translators to relay the network's programming.

Call sign	Frequency	City of license	FID	FCC info	Notes
W241CM	96.1 FM	Cortland, New York	13971	LMS	Relays WMHR
W300DG	107.9 FM	Greece, New York	150710	LMS	Relays WMHN
W270DY	101.9 FM	Ithaca, New York	22657	LMS	Relays WMHR
W262AC	100.3 FM	Little Falls, New York	21520	LMS	Relays WMHU
W250AD	97.9 FM	Long Lake, New York	24615	LMS	Relays WMHQ
W220BO	91.9 FM	Lowville, New York	5525	LMS	Relays WMHR
W213AR	90.5 FM	Lyons Falls, New York	5523	LMS	Relays WMHR
W249AS	97.7 FM	Norwich, New York	8396	LMS	Relays WMHR
W263CE	100.5 FM	Ogdensburg, New York	150706	LMS	Relays WMHI
W290AN	105.9 FM	Ogdensburg, New York	24614	LMS	Relays WMHI
W213BL	90.5 FM	Oneonta, New York	121969	LMS	Relays WMHR
W202CI	88.3 FM	Richville, New York	24619	LMS	Relays WMHR
W215BT	90.9 FM	Riverhead, New York	92332	LMS	Relays WMHR
W270BX	101.9 FM	Rochester, New York	150636	LMS	Relays WMHN
W254CY	98.7 FM	Saranac Lake, New York	150703	LMS	Relays WMHQ

== See also ==
- 1969 in radio
