= WJRN-LP =

- Summerfield, Florida; United States
- Frequency: 95.9 MHz

Programming
- Language: Spanish
- Format: Spanish

Ownership
- Owner: Hispanic-Multicultural Broadcasting Association

Technical information
- Licensing authority: FCC
- Facility ID: 133510
- Class: L1
- ERP: 100 watts
- HAAT: 17.0 meters (55.8 ft)
- Transmitter coordinates: 29°0′45″N 82°7′31″W

Links
- Public license information: LMS

WJRN-LP (95.9 FM) is a radio station broadcasting a Spanish music format. Licensed to Summerfield, Florida, United States, the station is currently owned by the Hispanic-Multicultural Broadcasting Association.
