= KBYN =

- Arnold, California; United States
- Broadcast area: Modesto area
- Frequency: 95.9 MHz

Programming
- Format: Regional Mexican

Ownership
- Owner: La Favorita Radio Network, Inc.

History
- Former call signs: KAGV (1993–1994); DKBYN (1994–1995)

Technical information
- Licensing authority: FCC
- Facility ID: 15005
- Class: A
- ERP: 860 watts
- HAAT: 263.0 meters (862.9 ft)
- Transmitter coordinates: 38°22′40″N 120°11′33″W

Links
- Public license information: Public file; LMS
- Website: lafavorita.net

KBYN (95.9 FM) is a radio station broadcasting a Regional Mexican format. Licensed to Arnold, California, United States, the station serves the Modesto area. The station is currently owned by La Favorita Radio Network, Inc.

On December 30, 2014, KBYN was granted a Federal Communications Commission construction permit to move to a new transmitter site, change the community of license to City of Angels, California (aka Angels Camp), decrease the effective radiated power to 240 watts and increase the height above average terrain to 488 meters.

== History ==
The station went on the air as KAGV on 1993-12-17. on 1994-06-01, the station changed its call sign to DKBYN. In FCC nomenclature the "D" prefix indicates that the station callsign was deleted. Their license was reinstated on 1995-06-01 to the current KBYN.
