= KWHF =

Coordinates: 35.795°N 90.793°W

- Harrisburg, Arkansas; United States
- Broadcast area: Jonesboro, Arkansas
- Frequency: 95.9 MHz
- Branding: The Wolf

Programming
- Format: Classic Country
- Affiliations: ABC News Radio

Ownership
- Owner: East Arkansas Broadcasters

History
- First air date: 1999

Technical information
- Licensing authority: FCC
- Class: C2
- ERP: 34,000 watts
- HAAT: 149 meters

Links
- Public license information: Public file; LMS
- Website: 959thewolf.com

KWHF (95.9 FM) is a commercial radio station located in Harrisburg, Arkansas, broadcasting to the Jonesboro, Arkansas, area. KWHF airs a classic country music format branded as "The Wolf".

As of the 2007 academic year, KWHF is the flagship radio station of the Arkansas State Radio Network and airs Arkansas State University athletic events.
