= KKIT =

Radio station in Taos, New Mexico

- Taos, New Mexico; United States
- Frequency: 95.9 MHz
- Branding: The Mountain

Programming
- Format: Top 40/CHR

Ownership
- Owner: Lorene Cino Gonzalez and Christopher Munoz; (L.M.N.O.C. Broadcasting LLC)

History
- First air date: 2005

Technical information
- Licensing authority: FCC
- Facility ID: 164164
- Class: A
- ERP: 4,000 watts
- HAAT: −192 meters (−630 ft)
- Transmitter coordinates: 36°23′22″N 105°35′9″W

Links
- Public license information: Public file; LMS
- Website: www.lmnocbroadcasting.com

KKIT (95.9 FM) is a radio station broadcasting a Top 40/CHR music format. The station, located in Taos, New Mexico, is owned by L.M.N.O.C. Broadcasting LLC.
