= KNIL-LP =

- Creighton, Nebraska; United States
- Frequency: 95.9 MHz
- Branding: Creighton Community Radio

Programming
- Format: Community radio

Ownership
- Owner: St. Ludgerus Catholic Church

Technical information
- Licensing authority: FCC
- Facility ID: 195783
- Class: LP1
- ERP: 100 watts
- HAAT: 14 metres (46 ft)
- Transmitter coordinates: 42°28′13.5″N 97°54′29.7″W

Links
- Public license information: LMS
- Webcast: Listen live
- Website: www.creightonradio.com

KNIL-LP (95.9 FM, "Creighton Community Radio") is a radio station licensed to serve the community of Creighton, Nebraska. The station is owned by St. Ludgerus Catholic Church and airs a community radio format.

The station was assigned the KNIL-LP call letters by the Federal Communications Commission on April 9, 2014.
