= WNPQ =

Radio station in New Philadelphia, Ohio

Coordinates: 40.598°N 81.492°W

- New Philadelphia, Ohio; United States
- Broadcast area: Canton, Ohio
- Frequency: 95.9 MHz

Programming
- Format: Contemporary Christian
- Network: K-Love

Ownership
- Owner: Educational Media Foundation

History
- First air date: February 2, 1969; 57 years ago
- Call sign meaning: New Philadelphia Quakers (local high school nickname)

Technical information
- Facility ID: 68421
- Class: A
- ERP: 4,100 watts
- HAAT: 121 meters (397 ft)

Links
- Webcast: Listen Live
- Website: klove.com

WNPQ (95.9 FM) is a commercial radio station licensed to New Philadelphia, Ohio, United States, serving the Canton market. It airs the K-Love contemporary Christian format. Previous formats include rock music in the 1980s as "Quick 96", later Top 40 hits as "Hot 95.9" and Country as "Canton Country 95.9".

The station was the FM sister station of WBTC, started by James Natoli in the name of his company, Tuscarawas Broadcasting Co. Its transmitter is located near Strasburg, Ohio.

James Natoli, 98, died Thursday evening June 1, 2017 at the Park Village Southside retirement community in New Philadelphia, Ohio. Effective March 14, 2022, Tuscarawas Broadcasting sold WNPQ to Educational Media Foundation for $850,000.
