= WMXN-FM =

Radio station in Stevenson, Alabama

- Stevenson, Alabama; United States
- Broadcast area: Scottsboro; Ft. Payne, Alabama
- Frequency: 101.7 MHz
- Branding: 101.7 The Torch

Programming
- Format: Classic hits
- Affiliations: Westwood One; Fox News Radio

Ownership
- Owner: Southern Torch Media, Inc.; (Southern Torch, Inc.)
- Sister stations: WKEA-FM

History
- First air date: January 13, 1977 (as WVSV)
- Former call signs: WVSV (1977–1993); WKZA (1993–1995); WMXN (1995–1997)

Technical information
- Licensing authority: FCC
- Facility ID: 33780
- Class: A
- ERP: 2,300 watts
- HAAT: 165 meters (541 ft)
- Transmitter coordinates: 34°41′02″N 85°48′04″W

Links
- Public license information: Public file; LMS
- Webcast: Listen live
- Website: 1017thetorch.com

WMXN-FM (101.7 FM, "101.7 The Torch") is a radio station licensed to serve Stevenson, Alabama, United States. The station is owned by Southern Torch Media, Inc. Launched in 1977 as WVSV (the "Voice of Sequatchie Valley"), this station broadcasts primarily to Jackson and DeKalb counties. Coverage extends into eastern Madison (Huntsville), Marshall (Albertville/Guntersville) and Northern Etowah (Gadsden) counties in Alabama. Counties in Tennessee include Marion (Jasper/South Pittsburg) and Franklin (Winchester). Counties with coverage in Georgia include Dade (Trenton) and Walker (LaFayette) counties.

== Programming ==
WMXN-FM broadcasts a classic hits music format. The station airs the syndicated Rick and Bubba Show on weekday mornings with locally produced programming the rest of the day. Live announcers have mid-day and afternoon shows. News updates are sourced from Fox News Radio and Southern Torch newspaper staff.

== History ==
Owned by Lynn Limited, Inc., this station was launched as WVSV in 1977 with 940 watts of effective radiated power from an antenna 490 feet (150 m) in height above average terrain.

In September 1990, Lynn Limited, Inc., reached an agreement to sell this station to George Guess. The deal was approved by the Federal Communications Commission (FCC) on November 16, 1990, and the transaction was consummated on December 31, 1990. Under Guess' ownership, the station applied for and received new call letters WKZA from the FCC on June 1, 1993.

In December 1993, George Guess made a deal to sell this station to KEA Radio, Inc. The deal was approved by the FCC on January 25, 1994, and the transaction was consummated on March 19, 1994. The station received new callsign WMXN on April 21, 1995, then changed to WMXN-FM on May 23, 1997, when an AM sister station was moved to the WMXN call letters.

The station would go on to be a part of a landmark local radio deal that was started in February 2019 when The Southern Torch newspaper based in Rainsville, Alabama, decided to buy WMXN and sister station WKEA-FM to form Southern Torch Media, Inc. The purchase was consummated on April 1, 2019, at a price of $600,000. On January 20, 2020, WMXN rebranded as "101.7 The Torch".

== Ownership ==
Before selling WMXN-FM and licensee WKEA-FM in nearby Scottsboro, Alabama to Southern Torch. KEA Radio, Inc., itself has been owned in equal part by Ronald H. Livengood, Julia Diana Livengood, Olvie E. Sisk, and Ivous T. Sisk. Ronald H. Livengood is the ex-husband of Julia Diane Livengood. Olvie and Ivous Sisk, a married couple, together also own 100% Air South Radio, Inc., which holds the license for WFTA in Fulton, Mississippi, and 80% of Metro Radio, Inc., which holds the license for WLZA in Eupora, Mississippi. As an individual, Olvie E, Sisk holds the license for WCNA in Potts Camp, Mississippi.
