= KGVM =

Radio station in Bozeman, Montana

- Bozeman, Montana; United States
- Frequency: 95.9 MHz
- Branding: "KGVM 95.9"

Programming
- Format: Community radio
- Affiliations: National Federation of Community Broadcasters; Pacifica Radio Network

Ownership
- Owner: Gallatin Valley Community Radio

History
- First air date: May 11, 2018
- Call sign meaning: "Gallatin Valley Montana"

Technical information
- Licensing authority: FCC
- Facility ID: 184751
- Class: C3
- ERP: 3,600 watts
- HAAT: 238 metres (781 ft)
- Transmitter coordinates: 45°38′20″N 111°15′56″W

Links
- Public license information: Public file; LMS
- Webcast: Listen live
- Website: kgvm.org

KGVM (95.9 FM) is a radio station licensed to serve the community of Bozeman, Montana. The station is owned by Gallatin Valley Community Radio and airs a community radio format.

The station was assigned the KGVM call letters by the Federal Communications Commission on June 19, 2015. The station's first on-air broadcast was on May 11, 2018.

The station operates from the basement of the Gallatin Labor Temple in Bozeman.
