= WKXM (AM) =

Winfield, Alabama; United States
- Frequency: 1300 kHz

Programming
- Format: Defunct

Ownership
- Owner: Ad-Media Management Corp.
- Sister stations: WKXM-FM

History
- First air date: August 23, 1965
- Last air date: August 2, 2012
- Former call signs: WEZQ (1965-March 30, 1990); WXDX (March 30-July 1, 1990)

Technical information
- Facility ID: 434
- Class: D
- Power: 5,000 watts (day); 30 watts (night)
- Transmitter coordinates: 33°55′52″N 87°48′36″W

WKXM (1300 AM) was an American radio station licensed to serve the community of Winfield, Alabama. The station, established in 1965, was last owned by Ad-Media Management Corp. The station fell permanently silent on August 2, 2012.

== Programming ==
Before it fell silent, the station broadcast a sports/talk radio format as a full-time affiliate of ESPN Radio.

== History ==
This station signed on the air in 1965 as WEZQ broadcasting with 1,000 watts of power on 1300 kHz under the ownership of John D. Self. WEZQ aired a country & western music format from its 1965 sign-on into the 1980s.

In June 1989, John Self made a deal to sell this station to James Boyd Pate. The deal was approved by the FCC on August 3, 1989, and the transaction was consummated on November 3, 1989. In January 1990, James Boyd Pate applied to transfer the license for this station to Ad-Media Management Corporation, a company he controlled. The transfer was approved by the FCC on February 12, 1990. The new owner had the FCC change the station's assigned call letters to WXDX on March 30, 1990, as a complement to its under-construction FM sister station, then known as WXZX, but these would prove short lived as the station switched again to the current WKXM call letters on July 1, 1990. (Three months later, the FM sister station would switch its callsign to match as WKXM-FM.)

In November 1991, James Boyd Pate reached an agreement to sell Ad-Media Management Corporation, the licensee for WKXM, to Harper-Mainord Broadcasting. The deal was approved by the FCC on December 30, 1991, and the transaction was consummated on December 31, 1991.

In July 1995, Harper-Mainord Broadcasting made a deal to turn sole control of Ad-Media Management Corporation to Jack Mainord. The deal was approved by the FCC on September 29, 1995, and the transaction was consummated on November 1, 1995.

Jack Mainord died on April 21, 1998, so after routine legal issues were resolved an application was made in September 1998 to transfer control of WKXM licensee Ad-Media Management Corporation to Melba F. Mainord, the executrix of his estate. The deal was approved by the FCC on October 15, 1998.

In March 2000, Melba F. Mainord made a deal to sell Ad-Media Management Corporation to B. Maxine Harper. The deal was approved by the FCC on April 24, 2000, and the transaction was consummated on May 1, 2000.

== Falling silent ==
WKXM's broadcast facilities were struck by lightning on July 4, 2012, and the station began operating with reduced power on backup equipment. On August 1, 2012, the station's longtime broadcast engineer died unexpectedly and, lacking the equipment and personnel to continue operating, the station fell silent on August 2, 2012.

On November 22, 2012, the station applied for special temporary authority to remain silent while working with the insurance company to repair the damaged broadcast equipment. The FCC granted this authority on January 17, 2013. Under the terms of the Telecommunications Act of 1996, as a matter of law a radio station's broadcast license is subject to automatic forfeiture and cancellation if they fail to broadcast for one full year.

WKXM resumed operations on June 24, 2013, but fell silent again on June 27, 2013. The station once again applied to the FCC for authority to remain silent.

On September 9, 2014, the FCC notified Ad-Media Management Corp. that unless it could show that WKXM had broadcast between June 27, 2013, and June 28, 2014, that its license was cancelled. On October 17, 2014, Ad-Media Management Corp. replied that the "economic realities of operating the station [...] without an FM translator" and the costs to repair the station to full operating capacity prevented them from completing the repairs and returning to service. The FCC deleted the station's call sign on October 21, 2014.
