= WKUZ =

- Wabash, Indiana; United States
- Broadcast area: Logansport, Indiana; Kokomo, Indiana
- Frequency: 95.9 Megahertz
- Branding: 95.9 Kiss FM

Programming
- Format: Country music

Ownership
- Owner: Upper Wabash Broadcasting Corporation

History
- First air date: April 1, 1965

Technical information
- Licensing authority: FCC
- Facility ID: 69496
- Class: A
- ERP: 4.2 kilowatts
- HAAT: 120 meters (390 ft)
- Transmitter coordinates: type:city 40°41′54.00″N 85°45′3.00″W

Links
- Public license information: Public file; LMS
- Website: wkuz.org

WKUZ is an FM radio station broadcasting on a frequency of 95.9 Megahertz. WKUZ is licensed to the city of Wabash, Indiana and is owned by Upper Wabash Broadcasting Corporation.

The country format of WKUZ is known as 95.9 Kiss FM.
