= WMYP =

- Frederiksted, U.S. Virgin Islands; United States
- Frequency: 98.3 MHz
- Branding: Rumba 98.3

Programming
- Format: Spanish/Tropical/Variety

Ownership
- Owner: JKC Communications; (Amanda Friedman)
- Sister stations: WVVI-FM; WJKC; WSKX; WMNG; WVIQ

History
- First air date: April 27, 1998
- Former call signs: WPPD (1998-1999); WREY (March–December 1999)

Technical information
- Licensing authority: FCC
- Facility ID: 82199
- Class: A
- ERP: 1,900 watts
- HAAT: 279 meters (916 feet)
- Transmitter coordinates: 17°44′51″N 64°50′11″W

Links
- Public license information: Public file; LMS
- Webcast: Listen Live
- Website: WMYP Online

WMYP (98.3 FM) is a radio station licensed to serve Frederiksted, U.S. Virgin Islands. The station is owned by Amanda Friedman. It airs a Spanish/Tropical/Variety format.

The Federal Communications Commission assigned the WPPD call letters to this station on April 27, 1998. This call sign was short-lived as the station switched to WREY on March 1, 1999, then switched again to the current WMYP call letters on December 3, 1999.

== Ownership ==
In July 2006, Amanda Friedman agreed to buy WMYP from Juan Padin and Jose Martinez (dba J&J Broadcasters) for a reported $350,000. Friedman is the wife of Jonathan K. Cohen who owns several other radio stations in the U.S. Virgin Islands.
