= WMSZ-LP =

- Hartsville, South Carolina; United States
- Frequency: 95.9 MHz
- Branding: "Easy 95.9 Community Radio"

Programming
- Format: Easy Listening
- Affiliations: USA Radio Network

Ownership
- Owner: Lighthouse Gospel Network

History
- Former call signs: WLGN-LP (2002); WHEZ-LP (2002–2022)

Technical information
- Licensing authority: FCC
- Facility ID: 131603
- Class: L1
- ERP: 100 watts
- HAAT: 27.0 meters (88.6 ft)
- Transmitter coordinates: 34°23′5″N 80°11′30″W

Links
- Public license information: LMS

WMSZ-LP (95.9 FM, "Easy 95.9 Community Radio") is a low-power radio station broadcasting an easy listening music format. Licensed to Hartsville, South Carolina, United States, the station is currently owned by Lighthouse Gospel Network and features programming from USA Radio Network.
