= WYNE-LP =

Radio station in Wayne, New Jersey

- Wayne, New Jersey; United States
- Broadcast area: Passaic County area
- Frequency: 95.9 MHz
- Branding: WYNE

Programming
- Format: Christian Radio
- Affiliations: Salem Radio Network

Ownership
- Owner: Preakness Valley United Reformed Church

History
- First air date: September 19, 2016

Technical information
- Licensing authority: FCC
- Facility ID: 194694
- Class: L1
- ERP: 27 watts
- HAAT: 41 meters (135 ft)
- Transmitter coordinates: 40°59′47.00″N 74°16′49.00″W

Links
- Public license information: LMS
- Website: wynefm.org

WYNE-LP (95.9 FM) is a Christian radio station licensed to Wayne, New Jersey and serves the Passaic County area. Its broadcast license is held by Preakness Valley United Reformed Church. The station is part of the New York City radio market, serving primarily the western third of its more than 16 million listeners (Nielsen Company Metro 12+ Population) with a broadcast reaching those in Passaic, Bergen, Morris and Essex counties in New Jersey.

== History ==
This station received its original construction permit from the Federal Communications Commission on April 30, 2015. The new station was assigned the WYNE-LP call sign by the FCC on June 2, 2015. The station received its license to cover from the FCC on September 19, 2016.

== Programming ==
The station's programming consists of locally produced Christian teaching and news as well as a blend of traditional easy listening and adult contemporary Christian music combined with nationally syndicated Christian teaching and programs including Renewing Your Mind with R.C. Sproul, Truth for Life with Alistair Begg, Just Thinking and Let My People Think with Ravi Zacharias, The Bible Study Hour with James Montgomery Boice, Unlocking the Bible with Colin Smith, Conversations with Harry Reeder, Revive our Hearts with Nancy DeMoss Wolgemuth, Joni and Friends with Joni Eareckson Tada, The White Horse Inn with Michael Horton, Reflections on the Word with John Vance, Lamplighter Theatre, Sing for Joy, Songs in the Night with Irwin Lutzer, Money Wise with Howard Dayton and Steve Moore, The Public Square from the American Policy Roundtable, and The Colson Center's BreakPoint.
