= WMVV =

Radio station in Griffin, Georgia

Coordinates: 33°22′12″N 84°08′00″W

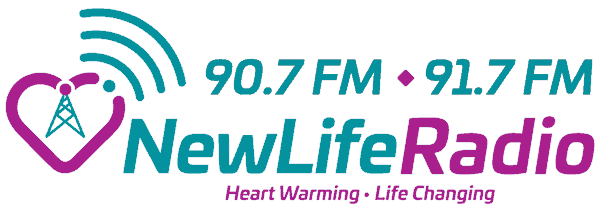
- Griffin, Georgia; United States
- Broadcast area: Atlanta metro area Griffin, Georgia; Covington, Georgia
- Frequency: 90.7 MHz
- Branding: New Life FM

Programming
- Format: Christian talk and teaching

Ownership
- Owner: Life Radio Ministries
- Sister stations: WMVW

History
- First air date: April 16, 1995

Technical information
- Licensing authority: FCC
- Facility ID: 46714
- Class: C2
- ERP: 18,000 watts
- HAAT: 144 metres (472 feet)

Links
- Public license information: Public file; LMS
- Webcast: Listen Live
- Website: wmvv.com

WMVV (90.7 FM) is a Christian radio station licensed to Griffin, Georgia, and serving the areas of Griffin, Forsyth, and Covington, as well as Southern and Eastern metro Atlanta. The station is owned by Life Radio Ministries. WMVV is simulcast on 91.7 WMVW in Peachtree City, Georgia.

WMVV airs a format consisting of Christian talk and teaching programs as well as Christian Music. Christian Talk and Teaching programs heard on WMVV include Running to Win with Erwin Lutzer, Turning Point with David Jeremiah, Focus On The Family, and Revive Our Hearts with Nancy DeMoss Wolgemuth.
