= WMNG =

- Christiansted, U.S. Virgin Islands; United States
- Frequency: 104.9 MHz
- Branding: 104.9 The Mongoose

Programming
- Format: Classic hits

Ownership
- Owner: Clara Communications Corporation
- Operator: JKC Communications
- Sister stations: WJKC, WMYP, WVVI-FM, WSKX, WVIQ

History
- First air date: 1997
- Former call signs: WAQW (1997, CP)

Technical information
- Licensing authority: FCC
- Facility ID: 81515
- Class: B
- ERP: 15,000 watts
- HAAT: 230 meters (750 ft)

Links
- Public license information: Public file; LMS
- Webcast: Listen live
- Website: viradio.com

WMNG (104.9 FM) is a radio station licensed to serve Christiansted, U.S. Virgin Islands. The station is owned by Clara Communications Corporation and operated by JKC Communications. It airs a classic hits music format.

The Federal Communications Commission assigned this station the call letters WAQW on February 7, 1997. This designation was short-lived as the station switched to the current WMNG call letters on September 26, 1997.

== Construction permit ==
WMNG is currently a class A station broadcasting with 15,000 watts of effective radiated power in a non-directional pattern from an antenna 213 meters above the average terrain.

The station originally broadcast with 6,000 watts of effective radiated power. On September 20, 2007 they had applied to become a more powerful class B station broadcasting with 30,000 watts of effective radiated power from a directional antenna 230 meters in height above average terrain. The proposed pattern would protect Puerto Rico from interference by this station's broadcast signal. A construction permit authorizing these changes was granted by the FCC on October 14, 2008.

By late 2011, the facility was broadcasting at 15,000 watts omnidirectional, instead of the applied-for power, as a compromise to ensure high signal performance, but to not interfere with Puerto Rican signals.
