= WKNN-FM =

- Pascagoula, Mississippi; United States
- Broadcast area: Biloxi-Gulfport-Pascagoula
- Frequency: 99.1 MHz
- Branding: K99 Country

Programming
- Language: English
- Format: Country
- Affiliations: Premiere Networks

Ownership
- Owner: iHeartMedia, Inc.; (iHM Licenses, LLC)
- Sister stations: WBUV, WMJY, WQYZ

History
- Former call signs: WPMO-FM (1986–1988); WKNN (1988–1989)
- Call sign meaning: WKNN relates to the station frequency-KNN-K99

Technical information
- Licensing authority: FCC
- Facility ID: 61367
- Class: C1
- ERP: 99,000 watts horizontal 97,300 watts vertical
- HAAT: 300 meters (984 feet)
- Transmitter coordinates: 30°29′09.70″N 88°42′53.10″W

Links
- Public license information: Public file; LMS
- Webcast: Listen Live
- Website: k99fm.iheart.com

WKNN-FM (99.1 MHz) is the heritage country radio station on the Mississippi Gulf Coast. Licensed to Pascagoula, Mississippi, United States, the station serves the Biloxi-Gulfport-Pascagoula area. The station is currently owned by iHeartMedia, Inc.

== History ==
Originally WPMO-FM prior to 1988 and owned by Starr Broadcasting (Peter Starr-Pres). This changed to WKNN-FM and the "K99-FM" moniker in 1988 under the direction of its then new general manager, Bob Lima (WQID/WVMI Biloxi, Mississippi). Lima transferred within the company to Daytona, Florida in 1992. Starr Broadcasting sold to Multi-Market Radio in 1994. A series of mergers including AM-FM and Capstar led to Clear Channel Communications acquiring the station in 2001. iHeartMedia, Inc. (formally Clear Channel Communications) currently owns and operates the station along with sister stations WMJY, WBUV and WQYZ
