= WKDS =

- Kalamazoo, Michigan; United States
- Frequency: 89.9 MHz
- Branding: Classical WMUK

Programming
- Format: Classical music

Ownership
- Owner: Kalamazoo Public Schools
- Operator: Western Michigan University
- Sister stations: WMUK

History
- First air date: February 14, 1983
- Former call signs: WSDK (1981–1982)
- Call sign meaning: Kalamazoo District Schools

Technical information
- Licensing authority: FCC
- Facility ID: 4198
- Class: A
- ERP: 140 watts
- HAAT: 38 meters
- Transmitter coordinates: 42.243°N 85.572°W

Links
- Public license information: Public file; LMS
- Webcast: Listen live
- Website: www.wmuk.org

WKDS (89.9 FM) is a radio station licensed to Kalamazoo, Michigan. The station is known as "Classical WMUK" and operated by Western Michigan University as a companion to its WMUK (102.1 FM).

== History ==
The station was run by high school students in the Kalamazoo Public Schools school district until a time brokerage agreement was signed with Western Michigan University on November 18, 2019. The frequency was used by WMU to separate its public WMUK (102.1 FM) into news/talk and classical music stations. In April, the Kalamazoo board of education, stating the station no longer was needed for educational purposes, approved its outright sale to WMU under a $125,000 agreement that also included a 24-month lease of the WKDS studios at Loy Norrix High School, while the district would receive underwriting time on WMUK and $20,000 to convert the school operation to an internet radio station.
