= Smart FM =

Indonesian radio station

- Indonesia
- Frequencies: See list

Programming
- Language: Indonesian
- Format: News/talk and business

Ownership
- Owner: KG Radio Network; Surya Citra Media

History
- First air date: May 20, 1996

Links
- Website: www.radiosmartfm.com

Smart FM is an Indonesian radio network that operates in ten major cities across the country, including Jakarta, Yogyakarta, Surabaya, Medan, Palembang, Pekanbaru, Banjarmasin, Balikpapan, Makassar and Manado. The network is known for its programming that focuses on business, economics, personal development, and inspirational talk shows, carrying the tagline "radio bisnis dan inspirasi" (business and inspiration radio).

== History ==
Smart FM began broadcasting in Manado on 20 May 1996, marking the start of what would become a national radio network. In its early years, the station operated with limited revenue and relied on long-term investment to sustain operations, though it gradually built a reputation through its focus on news, education, and business content. As the network grew, Smart FM extended its presence to additional cities.

By the early 2000s, Smart FM had established a growing network across several major urban centers. Expansion was accompanied by significant operational challenges, including high overhead costs, infrastructure maintenance, staffing, and the need for reliable broadcast facilities. Despite these obstacles, some stations achieved stronger commercial performance, especially in markets such as Makassar and Palembang, while others required longer periods of financial support before reaching stability. The network also emphasized maintaining editorial independence across its stations.

Smart FM strengthened its national presence when it opened its Jakarta station on 17 September 2002, which became the main center for the network's operations. On 15 October 2014, Smart FM was acquired by Kompas Gramedia. Since 2014, Smart FM also expanded to digital platforms such as online streaming and visual radio, allowing its programs to reach listeners beyond traditional FM broadcasts. As of 2019, the network covers Jakarta, Yogyakarta, Surabaya, Medan, Palembang, Pekanbaru, Banjarmasin, Balikpapan, Makassar and Manado.
