= KKBL =

Coordinates: 36°56′15″N 93°55′30″W

- Monett, Missouri; United States
- Frequency: 95.9 MHz
- Branding: The Blend

Programming
- Format: Adult hits

Ownership
- Owner: Eagle Broadcasting, Inc.

Technical information
- Licensing authority: FCC
- Facility ID: 43475
- Class: A
- ERP: 6,000 watts
- HAAT: 82 meters (269 ft)

Links
- Public license information: Public file; LMS
- Website: radiotalon.com/kkbl

KKBL (95.9 FM) is a radio station licensed to Monett, Missouri. The station broadcasts an adult hits format and is owned by Eagle Broadcasting, Inc.
