= WPNC-FM =

Adult contemporary radio station in Plymouth, North Carolina

- Plymouth, North Carolina; United States
- Broadcast area: Elizabeth City/Nags Head
- Frequency: 95.9 MHz
- Branding: Magic 95.9

Programming
- Format: Full service Adult contemporary
- Affiliations: ABC News Radio; Compass Media Networks; North Carolina News Network; Premiere Networks; WITN-TV

Ownership
- Owner: Durlyn Broadcasting

History
- First air date: December 1979 (as WKLX)
- Former call signs: WKLX (1979–1986)
- Call sign meaning: W Plymouth, North Carolina

Technical information
- Licensing authority: FCC
- Facility ID: 52737
- Class: A
- ERP: 2,600 watts
- HAAT: 101 meters
- Transmitter coordinates: 35°50′48″N 76°45′22″W

Links
- Public license information: Public file; LMS
- Webcast: Listen Live
- Website: magic959online.com

WPNC-FM (95.9 MHz) is a radio station broadcasting a Full-service adult contemporary format. Licensed to Plymouth, North Carolina, United States, it serves the Elizabeth City-Nags Head area. The station is licensed to Durlyn Broadcasting, which is 100% owned by William B. Cox III of Plymouth, North Carolina.

== History ==
From its sign-on in December 1979 to June 27, 1986, this station was WKLX. At one time, WPNC-FM aired a country music format, while co-owned WPNC was Contemporary Christian. In 1996 it became Magic 96. In April 2001, with a move to a new building, WPNC-FM became Magic 95.9, because so many vehicle radios display the exact frequency.

On April 7, 2017, the Federal Communications Commission revoked the license of WPNC-FM due to the non-payment of regulatory fees that had been past due since at least 2015. It is not known if the station remains on the air pending legal appeals, but the FCC revoked Durlyn's authority to continue broadcasting as of that date. By May 3, 2017, however, the station had its license reinstated, presumably due to paying the back debts.
