= KUUZ =

- Lake Village, Arkansas; United States
- Frequency: 95.9 MHz

Programming
- Format: Religious
- Affiliations: SonLife Radio Network

Ownership
- Owner: Family Worship Center Church, Inc.

Technical information
- Licensing authority: FCC
- Facility ID: 15961
- Class: C3
- ERP: 20,000 watts
- HAAT: 92.0 meters (301.8 ft)
- Transmitter coordinates: 33°20′7″N 91°7′33″W

Links
- Public license information: Public file; LMS
- Webcast: Listen live
- Website: http://sonlifetv.com

KUUZ (95.9 FM) is a radio station broadcasting a religious format, as an affiliate of SonLife Radio Network. Licensed to Lake Village, Arkansas, United States, the station is currently owned by Family Worship Center Church, Inc.
