= WMUK =

Public radio station in Kalamazoo, Michigan

- Kalamazoo, Michigan; United States
- Frequency: 102.1 MHz (HD Radio)
- Branding: Kalamazoo Public Radio

Programming
- Format: Public: News/Talk and Jazz
- Subchannels: HD2: Classical
- Affiliations: NPR

Ownership
- Owner: Western Michigan University

History
- First air date: January 15, 1951
- Former call signs: WMCR (1951–1961)
- Call sign meaning: Western Michigan University, Kalamazoo

Technical information
- Licensing authority: FCC
- Facility ID: 71874
- Class: B
- ERP: 50,000 watts
- HAAT: 149 meters
- Transmitter coordinates: 42.418°N 85.532°W

Links
- Public license information: Public file; LMS
- Webcast: Listen live
- Website: wmuk.org

WMUK (102.1 FM) is a non profit public radio station in Kalamazoo, Michigan. Owned and operated by Western Michigan University, WMUK broadcasts at an effective radiated power of 50,000 watts. WMUK is a charter member of both National Public Radio and the Michigan Public Radio Network. The station is also an affiliate of Public Radio International.

WMUK provides a mix of local and syndicated programming.

WMUK is one of the two local Kalamazoo radio stations broadcasting in HD Radio; the other is WKFR. It also operates an HD2 side channel with a classical music format as WMUK Classical, which is simulcast on Kalamazoo Public Schools-owned WKDS 89.9 FM.

WMUK Former Logo

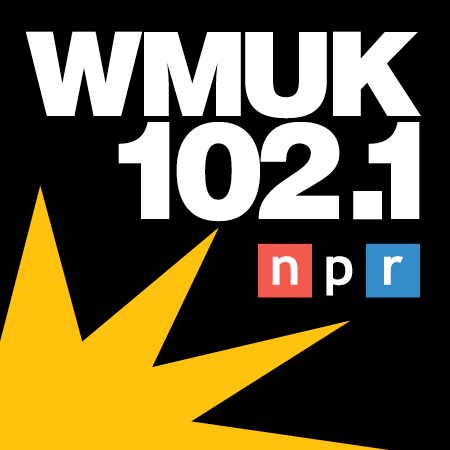
WMUK Previous Logo

In January 2020, WMUK eliminated classical music programming from its daytime schedule and became a full news/talk station during the day, with jazz continuing overnights. In addition to the already-running news programs Morning Edition, All Things Considered, As It Happens and Marketplace, WMUK added On Point, The Takeaway, 1A, Fresh Air and The Daily to its weekday schedule. Classical music programming moved to WMUK-HD2 and WKDS.

== See also ==
- Campus radio
- List of college radio stations in the United States
