= WLSE (FM) =

Radio station in Canton, Illinois

Coordinates: 40°29′44.0″N 89°57′10.0″W

- Canton, Illinois; United States
- Frequency: 103.3 MHz

Programming
- Language: English
- Format: Christian radio
- Affiliations: LifeTalk Radio

Ownership
- Owner: Lifestyle Education Academy International, Inc.

History
- First air date: December 20, 2013

Technical information
- Licensing authority: FCC
- Facility ID: 184672
- Class: A
- ERP: 5,700 watts
- HAAT: 102 meters (335 ft)
- Translator: 99.1 W256CH (Pekin)
- Repeater: 98.5 WLSB (Augusta)

Links
- Public license information: Public file; LMS
- Website: wlsefm.org

WLSE is a Christian radio station licensed to Canton, Illinois, broadcasting on 103.3 FM. It is owned by Lifestyle Education Academy International, Inc. WLSE airs programming from LifeTalk Radio, along with local talk and Christian contemporary music.

== History ==
The Federal Communications Commission allocated the empty frequency 103.3 MHz (channel 277A) to Canton, Illinois in August 2001 to make up for the empty 98.3 MHz (channel 252A) allocation being moved to Abingdon, Illinois.

WLSE received its broadcast license on December 12, 2013.

== Translators ==
WLSE is simulcast on WLSB in Augusta, Illinois, although being silent, and is also heard in Pekin, Illinois through a translator at 99.1 MHz. These translators were originally owned by the Illinois Association of Seventh-day Adventists, and were sold to LSE Broadcasting in 2017.

Call sign	Frequency	City of license	FID	ERP (W)	HAAT	FCC info
WLSB	98.5 FM	Augusta, Illinois	190445	100	22 m (72 ft)	LMS
W256CH	99.1 FM	Pekin, Illinois	141901	13	100 m (328 ft)	LMS
