= Power Hit Radio (Lithuania) =

Coordinates: 54.7074°N 25.2847°E

- Lithuania
- Broadcast area: Lithuania
- Frequencies: Vilnius 95.9 FM; Kaunas 91.0 FM; Klaipėda 96.7 FM; Šiauliai 89.7 FM; Panevėžys 87.9 FM; Telšiai 100.0 FM; Utena 93.9 FM; Alytus 88.3 FM; Marijampolė 87.6 FM; Anykščiai 99.9 FM; Tauragė 95.9 FM; Kėdainiai 96.9 FM; Mažeikiai 89.2 FM

Programming
- Format: CHR / dance / trance

Ownership
- Owner: Providence Equity Partners

Links
- Website: powerhitradio.tv3.lt

Previous logo

Power Hit Radio is a commercial radio station in Lithuania that plays dance music aimed at listeners aged around 15 to 35. "Power Hit Radio" started broadcasting in 2003. Transmitted through 9 transmitters throughout Lithuania. The "Power Hit Radio" program features a number of broadcasts, among which are: "Šok į kelnes" ("Get in the pants"), "Power hitai" ("Power hits"),"Power popietė" ("Power afternoon"), "Burbulas" ("Bubble") and the weekend's release "Power savaitgalis" ("Power Weekend"), In The Mix.

In 2019, Power Hit Radio was the most listened radio station among Vilnius youths. In 2022, radio station had €0.9 million in revenue.
