= WFOG-LP =

- Hillsville, Virginia; United States
- Broadcast area: Metro Hillsville
- Frequency: 95.9 MHz

Programming
- Format: Variety

Ownership
- Owner: Pink Doors Media

History
- First air date: July 20, 2015
- Former call signs: WXMM-LP (2014–2016)

Technical information
- Licensing authority: FCC
- Facility ID: 196248
- Class: L1
- Power: 21 watts
- HAAT: 65 meters (213 ft)
- Transmitter coordinates: 36°44′29.4″N 80°43′25.2″W

Links
- Public license information: LMS

WFOG-LP is a variety–formatted broadcast radio station licensed to and serving Hillsville, Virginia. WFOG-LP is owned and operated by Pink Doors Media.
