= WLFE =

Radio station in Cutler Bay, Florida

- Cutler Bay, Florida; United States
- Broadcast area: Miami-Dade County; upper Florida Keys
- Frequency: 90.9 MHz (HD Radio)
- Branding: Vida Unida 90.9 FM

Programming
- Format: Spanish language Contemporary Christian
- Subchannels: HD2: Christian adult contemporary "WayFM"; HD3: Contemporary worship music "Worship 24/7"; HD4: Christian radio "Moody Radio"

Ownership
- Owner: Hope Media Group

History
- First air date: 2004
- Former call signs: WGES (1995–2006); WGES-FM (2006–2010)
- Call sign meaning: "Life"

Technical information
- Licensing authority: FCC
- Facility ID: 76516
- Class: C1
- ERP: 100,000 watts
- HAAT: 72.0 meters (236.2 ft)
- Transmitter coordinates: 25°19′31.00″N 80°24′16.00″W

Links
- Public license information: Public file; LMS
- Webcast: Listen Live; Listen Live (HD2); Listen Live (HD3); Listen Live (HD4)
- Website: vidaunida.com wayfm.com (HD2) worship247.com (HD3) moodyradio.org (HD4)

WLFE (90.9 FM) is a radio station broadcasting a contemporary Christian format that launched on February 8, 2023. Licensed to Cutler Bay, Florida, United States, the station serves Miami-Dade County and the upper Florida Keys. The station is operated by Hope Media.

From March 1, 2010, until February 8, 2023, WLFE operated as "LifeFM", a Christian radio station made up of mostly messages from multiple pastors and teachers from all around the United States. Hope Media acquired WLFE on December 30, 2022, bringing its Spanish-language Christian format to the station.
