= WPLS-LP =

Radio station at Furman University in Greenville, South Carolina

Coordinates: 34.920°N 82.438°W

- Greenville, South Carolina; United States
- Branding: WPLS Radio

Programming
- Format: College/Variety

Ownership
- Owner: Furman University

History
- First air date: 1940
- Former call signs: WFRN, WFBA

Technical information
- Licensing authority: FCC
- Facility ID: 132033

Links
- Public license information: LMS

WPLS is a student-run radio station at Furman University in Greenville, South Carolina. The station features a variety of programming, much of which includes sports, classic rock, and independent music. WPLS broadcast on 95.9 FM until 2012, when the station dropped its FM license to offer streaming only services via its new website.

== History ==
Furman took to the airwaves in 1940 when alumnus and trustee Roger C. Peace provided the university with its first studio, which broadcast on 600 AM. In its early years, the station was run on carrier current, meaning it was a very low power AM station that did not require a U.S. Federal Communications Commission license and broadcast through the campus electrical system. During this time, programming was routinely interrupted by inclement weather.

In response to changes in students' listening habits, Furman founded a new station, the Furman Broadcasting Association, or WFBA, in 1965. According to legend, WFBA broadcast "Satisfaction" by the Rolling Stones to inaugurate their new studio because the other rock stations in Greenville had deemed the song too obscene for the air.

Within a year, the Student Broadcasting Association chose to rename the station, which became Furman Radio Network, or WFRN. In the following years, WFRN became increasingly popular among students because the larger rock station in Greenville turned its antennas towards downtown at night, making it impossible to listen from campus.

The Furman Radio Network reshaped itself in the late 1970s when a station manager began pushing for WFRN to become an educational FM station. He, along with Student Services, convinced the university to put $10,000 into building an improved station. Luckily for the station, the upgrade was approved in time to bypass an FCC deadline halting all such applications due to the belief that similar low-powered FM stations would be a detriment to broadcasting. Had the university abstained any longer, WFRN could have been effectively forced off the air by virtually any full-power station that wanted access to Furman's broadcasting frequency.

In 1980, the station officially made the switch to FM and became known as WPLS 96.5 FM and eventually WPLS 96.7 FM. The station found new success in the 1980s and 1990s, culminating in the purchase of a new antenna in the early 1990s that increased its broadcasting range to 15 miles, permitting WPLS programs to reach the greater Greenville community. The station offered syndicated programming as well as live sports coverage for Furman games. At this time, the station boasted over 100 members.

WPLS took a hit in 2002 when Clear Channel Radio's WPEK-FM, which broadcast at the same frequency, moved from Greenwood, SC to Greenville and temporarily forced the station off the air. Because WPEK was a commercial station with a range much larger than 15 miles, such a transition was legal at the time. A station advisor applied for an upgrade to a low-power FM station and WPLS resumed broadcasting as 95.9 FM in early 2004, beginning a two-year rebuilding stage.

The late 2000s were another transitive period for WPLS. The station underwent a year of radio silence during the 2008-09 academic year due to a severe lightning strike that disabled the station's transmitter, which was located on the football field and lacked a surge protector. During this time, WPLS relied entirely on online streaming and shared a succession of websites that failed to stay online for more than a year or two at a time. In 2009, the station purchased a new transmitter with a limited broadcasting range of about 5 miles and resumed broadcasting both online and over the air.

In 2012, the university granted WPLS a new studio as part of the Trone Student Center renovations. As part of the new studio, the station stopped broadcasting on FM, which had become difficult to manage and failed to consistently work even on Furman's own campus. At this time, WPLS transitioned fully to online streaming, coinciding with the launch of a new website. It continues to be a university/college station, also serving as a practice station for college students interested in media/broadcast/journalism.
