= WLKM-FM =

Coordinates: 41°55′41″N 85°38′18″W

- Three Rivers, Michigan; United States
- Broadcast area
- Frequency: 95.9 MHz
- Branding: The Mix

Programming
- Format: Adult contemporary

Ownership
- Owner: Impact Radio

History
- First air date: March 1975
- Call sign meaning: Welkome

Technical information
- Licensing authority: FCC
- Facility ID: 70461
- Class: A
- ERP: 3,600 watts
- HAAT: 129.6 meters

Links
- Public license information: Public file; LMS
- Webcast: Listen Live
- Website: wlkm.com

WLKM-FM is a radio station owned by Impact Radio and licensed to Three Rivers, Michigan. The featured music is adult contemporary. The format switched from classic hits on June 17, 2012, when the Dial Global Classic Hits format the station had been carrying was discontinued. Programming now comes from Westwood One's AC format. Prior to it being an adult contemporary formatted station, WLKM was formerly a top-40 station with an affiliate of Scott Shannon's Rockin' America Top 30 Countdown in the 1980s.

== Sources ==
- Michiguide.com - WLKM-FM History
