= WKXM-FM =

- Winfield, Alabama; United States
- Frequency: 97.7 MHz
- Branding: Gold 97.7

Programming
- Format: Oldies
- Affiliations: ABC Radio

Ownership
- Owner: Ad-Media Management Corp.
- Sister stations: WKXM

History
- First air date: 1991
- Former call signs: WXZX (3-10/1990)

Technical information
- Licensing authority: FCC
- Facility ID: 435
- Class: A
- ERP: 3,900 watts
- HAAT: 123 meters (404 feet)
- Transmitter coordinates: 34°01′53″N 87°48′06″W

Links
- Public license information: Public file; LMS

WKXM-FM (97.7 FM, "Gold 97.7") is a radio station licensed to serve Winfield, Alabama, United States. The station is owned by Ad-Media Management Corp.

WKXM-FM broadcasts an oldies music format which features programming from ABC Radio.

== History ==
This station received its original construction permit for a new FM radio station broadcasting with 3,000 watts of effective radiated power at 105.9 MHz from the Federal Communications Commission on February 22, 1990. The new station was assigned the call letters WXZX by the FCC on March 20, 1990. While still under construction, the station changed callsigns on October 1, 1990, to the current WKXM-FM as a complement to their AM sister station now known as WKXM. WKXM-FM received its license to cover from the FCC on May 1, 1992.

WKXM was formerly located at 105.9 FM but, for technical reasons that involved other radio stations, a 2004 frequency change was required.
