= WKRI-LP =

- Richmond, Kentucky; United States
- Broadcast area: Metro Richmond
- Frequency: 95.9 MHz
- Branding: FM95.9 WKRI

Programming
- Format: Classic Hits; Classic Top 40; Oldies

Ownership
- Owner: RichmondRadio, Inc.

History
- First air date: April 2016
- Call sign meaning: Kentucky Richmond

Technical information
- Licensing authority: FCC
- Facility ID: 196114
- Class: L1
- ERP: 100 watts
- HAAT: 30 meters (98 ft)
- Transmitter coordinates: 37°43′28.5″N 84°18′37.1″W

Links
- Public license information: LMS
- Webcast: Listen live

WKRI-LP is a Classic Hits, Classic Top 40 and Oldies formatted broadcast radio station licensed to and serving Richmond, Kentucky. WKRI-LP is owned and operated by RichmondRadio, Inc.
