= WKEA-FM =

Radio station in Fort Payne, Alabama

- Scottsboro, Alabama; United States
- Frequency: 98.3 MHz
- Branding: 98.3 Wild Country

Programming
- Format: Country
- Affiliations: Jones Radio Network, Fox News Radio

Ownership
- Owner: Southern Torch Media, Inc.; (Southern Torch, Inc.)
- Sister stations: WMXN-FM

History
- First air date: November 5, 1965
- Former call signs: WCNA (1965–1981)

Technical information
- Licensing authority: FCC
- Facility ID: 33781
- Class: C3
- ERP: 25,000 watts
- HAAT: 150 meters (492 feet)
- Transmitter coordinates: 34°32′00″N 85°55′20″W
- Translator: 105.7 W289BV (Scottsboro)

Links
- Public license information: Public file; LMS
- Webcast: Listen Live

WKEA-FM (98.3 FM, "98.3 Wild Country") is a radio station licensed to serve the community of Scottsboro, Alabama, United States. The station is owned by Southern Torch Media, Inc.

WKEA-FM broadcasts a country music format including programming from Jones Radio Network and Fox News Radio.

== History ==
Radio station WCNA-FM was founded in 1965 by Dr. Ralph Sheppard, a local dentist and owner of the Jackson County Advertiser, a weekly newspaper. The first FM radio station in Jackson County, Alabama, WCNA-FM began broadcasting a country music format on November 3, 1965. In 1971, Sheppard transferred the license to a company named Mellow Sound Broadcasting. The city of Scottsboro later honored Sheppard by declaring April 30, 2008, as "Dr. Ralph Sheppard Day" in honor of his many contributions to the community.

In July 1981, Mellow Sound Broadcasting, Inc., made a deal to sell this station to KEA Radio, Inc. The deal was approved by the FCC on September 28, 1981. The new owners had the FCC assign new call letters WKEA-FM on October 1, 1981.

In late August 2013, the station debuted a translator (W289BV) on 105.7 MHz, relaying WKEA. In a curious move, despite being a simulcast, the translator has its own branding, as "Lake 105.7".

On August 19, 2019, WKEA rebranded as "98.3 Wild Country". The station became part of a landmark local radio deal in February 2019 when The Southern Torch newspaper and website companies made a deal to buy the KEA Radio properties, WKEA, and sister station WMXN-FM 101.7 to start Southern Torch Media, Inc. The purchase was consummated on April 1, 2019, at a price of $600,000.
