= Rock Harbor, Florida =

- Unincorporated community
- Location within Florida Location within the United States
- Coordinates: 25.077°N 80.46°W
- Country: United States
- State: Florida
- County: Monroe
- Elevation: 9.8 ft (3 m)
- Time zone: UTC-5 (Eastern (EST))
  - Summer (DST): UTC-4 (EDT)

Rock Harbor is an unincorporated community in Monroe County, Florida, United States, located in the upper Florida Keys on Key Largo on US 1 (the Overseas Highway) northeast of Thompson and southwest of the census-designated place of Key Largo.

== Geography ==
Rock Harbor is located at 25.077°N 80.46°W at an elevation of 10 feet (3 m), relatively high for the Keys.
