= WLDW =

K-Love radio station in Salisbury, Maryland, United States

- Salisbury, Maryland; United States
- Frequency: 105.5 MHz

Programming
- Format: Contemporary Christian
- Network: K-Love

Ownership
- Owner: Educational Media Foundation

History
- First air date: July 25, 1982
- Former call signs: WKYZ (1982–1986); WLVW (1986–1989); WDVH (1989–1991); WLVW-FM (1991–2004); WDKZ (2004–2011); WLVW (2011–2019); WLSW (2019–2024)

Technical information
- Licensing authority: FCC
- Facility ID: 28167
- Class: A
- ERP: 2,100 watts
- HAAT: 117 meters (384 ft)
- Transmitter coordinates: 38°24′26.4″N 75°35′55.7″W

Links
- Public license information: Public file; LMS
- Webcast: Listen live
- Website: www.klove.com

WLDW (105.5 FM) is a radio station broadcasting a Christian music format. Licensed to Salisbury, Maryland, United States, the station is owned by Educational Media Foundation.
