= WKID =

Radio station in Vevay, Indiana

Coordinates: 38.837°N 85.030°W

- Vevay, Indiana; United States
- Broadcast area: Vevay, Indiana
- Frequency: 95.9 MHz
- Branding: Froggy 95.9

Programming
- Format: Country

Ownership
- Owner: WE Broadcasting

History
- Former call signs: WMGH (1974–1977); WAVV (1977–1984); WCVK (1984–1985)

Technical information
- Licensing authority: FCC
- Facility ID: 55249
- Class: A
- ERP: 2,800 watts
- HAAT: 94 meters (308 ft)

Links
- Public license information: Public file; LMS

WKID (95.9 FM "Froggy 95.9") is a radio station owned by WE Broadcasting in Vevay, Indiana. The station operates with 3,000 watts radiated power. Studios are located on Main Street in Vevay.
