= List of radio stations in Guanajuato =

This is a list of radio stations in the Mexican state of Guanajuato, which can be sorted by their call signs, frequencies, location, ownership, names, and programming formats.

Radio stations in Guanajuato
Call sign	Frequency	Location	Owner	Name	Format
XEGTO-AM (Note: Combo with XHGTO-FM 95.9)	590 AM	Guanajuato	XEGTO, S.A. de C.V.	Éxtasis Digital	English classic hits
XEEMM-AM	810 AM	Salamanca	Marco Antonio Héctor Contreras Santoscoy	Salmantina	
XECSCN-AM	840 AM	Celaya	Radio Lacustre, A.C.	—	—
XELNEP-AM	910 AM	León	Escápate al Paraíso, S.A. de C.V.	—	—
XERE-AM (Note: Combo with XHRE-FM 88.1)	920 AM	Celaya	Radio XHRE, S. de R.L. de C.V.	Radio Lobo	Regional Mexican
XECSEC-AM	1130 AM	San Miguel de Allende	Alejandro Sánchez Torres	—	—
XECSEG-AM	1160 AM	Acámbaro	Radio Lacustre, A.C.	—	—
XEZH-AM	1260 AM	Salamanca	Fomento Radiofónico del Bajío, S.A.	XEZH	News/talk
XECCBU-AM	1290 AM	Salvatierra	Radio Cañón, S.A. de C.V.	La Q	Spanish adult hits
XEXV-AM (Note: Combo of XHXV-FM 88.9)	1300 AM	Arroyo Seco	León Radio XV, S.A. de C.V.	Radar	Contemporary hit radio
XECSFC-AM	1370 AM	Dolores Hidalgo Cuna de la Independencia Nacional	Radio Lacustre, A.C.	—	—
XECCBX-AM	1470 AM	Pozo de Parras	Radio Cañón, S.A. de C.V.	—	—
XEFL-AM (Note: Combo of XHFL-FM 90.7)	1500 AM	Guanajuato	Radio Santa Fe de Guanajuato, S.A.	Radio Santa Fe	
XESD-AM (Note: Combo of XHSD-FM 99.3)	1530 AM	Silao	Jaced, S.A. de C.V.	@FM	Contemporary hit radio
XEMAS-AM	1560 AM	Salamanca	Televisora de Irapuato, S.A.	WE Radio	News/talk
XECSGG-AM	1570 AM	Comonfort	Radio Lacustre, A.C.	—	—
XECCBB-AM	1590 AM	San Francisco del Rincón	Radio Cañón, S.A. de C.V.	La Q	Spanish adult hits
XECSCA-AM	1670 AM	Tarandacuao	Tarandacuao Pueblo de Abundante Agua, A.C.	—	—
XHRE-FM	88.1 FM	Celaya	Radio XHRE, S. de R.L. de C.V.	Radio Lobo	Regional Mexican
XHSJI-FM	88.3 FM	San José Iturbide	José Guadalupe Bernal Vázquez	Radio Lobo	Regional Mexican
XHCN-FM	88.5 FM	Irapuato	Radio XECN, S.A. de C.V.	Los 40	Contemporary hit radio
XHXV-FM	88.9 FM	Leon	León Radio XV, S.A. de C.V.	Radar	Contemporary hit radio
XHEFG-FM	89.1 FM	Celaya	Señal 84, S.A. de C.V.	La Mejor	Regional Mexican
XHAK-FM	89.7 FM	Acámbaro	Organización Radiofónica de Acámbaro, S.A. de C.V.	La Mejor	Regional Mexican
XHPECD-FM	89.7 FM	Dolores Hidalgo Cuna de la Independencia Nacional	Ciencia, Comunicación y Tecnología de Irapuato, A.C.	Magnética FM	Variety
XHITC-FM	89.9 FM	Celaya	Patronato Pro-Estación Radiodifusora del Instituto Tecnológico Regional de Celaya, A.C.	Radio Tecnológico de Celaya	Cultural
XHSCMJ-FM	89.9 FM	Ocampo	Comunicaciones Guanajuato Norte, A.C.	—	—
XHPSJI-FM	90.1 FM	San José Iturbide	Medios Digitales RMX, S.A. de C.V.	W Radio	News/talk
XHML-FM	90.3 FM	León	XHML-FM, S.A. de C.V.	La Bestia Grupera	Regional Mexican
XHVW-FM	90.5 FM	Acámbaro	Organización Radiofónica de Acámbaro, S.A. de C.V.	Exa FM	Contemporary hit radio
XHFL-FM	90.7 FM	Guanajuato	Radio Santa Fe de Guanajuato, S.A.	Radio Santa Fe	
XHLTO-FM	91.1 FM	León	Universidad de Guanajuato	Radio Universidad de Guanajuato	University radio
XHSML-FM	91.3 FM	San Miguel de Allende	Universidad de Guanajuato	Radio Universidad de Guanajuato	University radio
XHPEBH-FM	91.5 FM	León	Fundación Cultural para la Sociedad Mexicana, A.C.	Radio María	Catholic radio
XHYA-FM	91.9 FM	Irapuato	Compañía Radiofónica del Centro, S.A. de C.V.	La Picosa	Regional Mexican
XHSMA-FM	92.1 FM	San Miguel de Allende	Centro para los Adolescentes de San Miguel de Allende, A.C.	Radio Cascabel	Variety
XHOI-FM	92.3 FM	León	Organización Independiente de Fomento Musical, S.A.	Blu FM	English classic hits
XHGX-FM	92.5 FM	San Luis de la Paz (Cuartel de Pozos)	Fernando Roberto González Espinoza	La Mejor	Regional Mexican
XHSAG-FM	92.5 FM	Salamanca	XESAG-AM, S.A. de C.V.	La Perrona	Regional Mexican
XHFAC-FM	92.9 FM	Salvatierra	Imagen Radiofónica, S.A. de C.V.	La Poderosa	Regional Mexican
XHERZ-FM	93.1 FM	León	Radio XHRZ León, S.A. de C.V.	Los 40	Contemporary hit radio
XHNY-FM	93.5 FM	Irapuato	Sucesores de Sergio Olivares Gascon, S.A. de C.V.	Exa FM	Contemporary hit radio
XHRPL-FM	93.9 FM	León	El Poder de Las Noticias, S.A. de C.V.	La Poderosa	Regional Mexican
XHJTA-FM	94.3 FM	Irapuato	Radio XHJTA, S. de R.L. de C.V.	Amor	Romantic
XHPEBI-FM	94.7 FM	León	Comunicación Integral para la Familia, A.C.	Más Que Radio	Variety
XHNH-FM	95.1 FM	Irapuato	Marco Antonio Contreras Chávez; Alicia Hortensia, Amparo Hilda y Adela Contreras Santos	Stereo 95	English classic hits
XHELG-FM	95.5 FM	Quinta Noriega	Radio Impulsora del Centro, S.A.	LG, La Grande	Spanish oldies
XHBV-FM	95.7 FM	Moroleón	Radio Moroleón, S.A. de C.V.	Radio Alegría	
XHGTO-FM	95.9 FM	Guanajuato	XEGTO, S.A. de C.V.	Éxtasis Digital	English classic hits
XHEJE-FM	96.3 FM	Dolores Hidalgo	Reyna López Hermanos, S.A. de C.V.	Radio Reyna	
XHCUE-FM	96.5 FM	Cuerámaro	Por Un Cuerámaro Mejor Comunicado, A.C.	Estéreo Sol	Community radio
XHY-FM	96.7 FM	Celaya	XHEY, S.A. de C.V.	Steroe Cristal	Romantic
XHPEBJ-FM	96.7 FM	León	Fundación Ecoforestal, A.C.	La Lupe	Spanish adult hits
XHPQ-FM	97.5 FM	León	Radio XHPQ León, S. de R.L. de C.V.	Match	Contemporary hit radio
XHLG-FM	98.3 FM	León	Radio Promotora de León, S.A.	Ultra	Contemporary hit radio
XHAMO-FM	98.9 FM	Irapuato	Radio Amor, S.A. de C.V.	Éxitos	Spanish adult hits
XHSCBS-FM	98.9 FM	Tarandacuao	Enlace Taranda, A.C.	Enlace Taranda	Community radio
XHSD-FM	99.3 FM	Silao	Jaced, S.A. de C.V.	@FM	Contemporary hit radio
XHAF-FM	99.5 FM	Celaya	Radio Comunicación Trébol de Celaya, S.A. de C.V.	@FM	Contemporary hit radio
XHSO-FM	99.9 FM	León	Stereorey México, S.A.	La Mejor	Regional Mexican
XHSCBW-FM	100.5 FM	Yuriria	Yuririapundaro 104.7, A.C.	Radio Activa	Community radio
XHERW-FM	101.1 FM	León	Transmisora Regional Radio Fórmula, S.A. de C.V.	Radio Fórmula	News/talk
XHVLO-FM	101.5 FM	Guanajuato	Promotora de la Comunicacion, S.A.	Éxtasis Digital	English classic hits
XHEOF-FM	101.9 FM	El Puesto	Radio XEOF-AM, S.A. de C.V.	Radio Juventud	Spanish and English classic hits
XHOO-FM	102.3 FM	Guanajuato	XHOO-FM, S.A. de C.V.	Fiesta Mexicana	Regional Mexican
XHIRG-FM	102.7 FM	Irapuato	XEIRG-AM, S.A. de C.V.	Campirana	Regional Mexican
XHNC-FM	102.9 FM	Celaya	Radio Comunicación Trébol de Celaya, S.A. de C.V.	Fiesta Mexicana	Regional Mexican
XHXF-FM	103.1 FM	León	Radio XHXF, S. de R.L. de C.V.	Mix	English adult contemporary
XHSQ-FM	103.3 FM	San Miguel de Allende	Radio San Miguel, S.A.	Radio San Miguel	Variety
XHCEL-FM	103.7 FM	Praderas de la Soledad	Radio XECEL, S.A. de C.V.	El y Ella	Pop
XHMD-FM	104.1 FM	León	Stereorey México, S.A.	Exa FM	Contemporary hit radio
XHZN-FM	104.5 FM	Celaya	FM Celaya, S.A. de C.V.	Exa FM	Contemporary hit radio
XHLEO-FM	105.1 FM	Quinta Noriega	Radio Sistema del Bajío, S.A.	La Rancherita	Ranchera
XHBO-FM	105.5 FM	San José de la Sonaja	Radio BO, S.A. de C.V.	Fiesta Mexicana	Regional Mexican
XHMIG-FM	105.9 FM	San Miguel de Allende	GIM Televisión Nacional, S.A. de C.V.	Imagen Radio	News/talk
XHITO-FM	106.3 FM	Irapuato	Radio XHITO Irapuato, S. de R.L. de C.V.	La Comadre	Regional Mexican
XHACN-FM	107.1 FM	Leon	Transmisora Regional Radio Fórmula, S.A. de C.V.	Trión	Alternative
XHSCBN-FM	107.3 FM	San Felipe	Radio Actitud San Felipe, A.C.	Radio Actitud	Community radio
XHQRO-FM	107.5 FM	Celaya	Corporación Radiofónica de Celaya, S.A. de C.V.	Radar	Contemporary hit radio
XHWE-FM	107.9 FM	Irapuato	XEWE Radio Irapuato, S.A. de C.V.	W Radio	News/talk
