= 92.5 FM =

FM radio frequency

The following radio stations broadcast on FM frequency 92.5 MHz:

== Argentina ==
- Boreal in Capilla del Señor, Buenos Aires
- LRM749 in Santa Fe, Santa Fe (it has 92.3 FM assigned)
- FM 92.5 in Villa Gobernador Gálvez, Santa Fe
- LRI757 FM92 in Roldán, Santa Fe
- Frecuencia Zero in Buenos Aires
- LRP760 Hersilia in Hersilia, Santa Fe
- Laser in Santa Fe de la Vera Cruz, Santa Fe
- Latina in Salta
- Okey in General Arenales, Buenos Aires
- Radio Maria in Ayacucho, Buenos Aires
- Radio Maria in Pergamino, Buenos Aires
- Radio Maria in San Carlos de Bolívar, Buenos Aires
- Radio Maria in Curuzú Cuatiá, Corrientes
- Radio Maria in Clorinda, Formosa
- Radio Maria in Caucete, San Juan
- Radio María in Joaquín V. González, Salta
- Signos in Munro, Buenos Aires
- Tiempo in Piamonte, Santa Fe
- Vida in Fortín Olmos, Santa Fe

== Australia ==
- ABC Central Coast in Gosford, New South Wales
- 7PB in Launceston, Tasmania
- Radio National in Hamilton, Victoria

== Canada (Channel 223) ==
- CBCD-FM in Pembroke, Ontario
- CBGC-FM in Carmanville, Newfoundland and Labrador
- CBSI-FM-7 in Havre-Saint-Pierre, Quebec
- CBUW-FM in Powell River, British Columbia
- CFBX-FM in Kamloops, British Columbia
- CFEA-FM in Nikamo, Quebec
- CKKS-FM-1 in Abbotsford, British Columbia
- CHFA-3-FM in Peace River, Alberta
- CHUT-FM-1 in Val-d'Or, Quebec
- CIAM-FM-8 in Charlie Lake, British Columbia
- CILX-FM in Ile-a-la-Crosse, Saskatchewan
- CIOG-FM-1 in Summerside, Prince Edward Island
- CJLC-FM in Prince Albert, Saskatchewan
- CJMM-FM-1 in La Sarre, Quebec
- CJRH-FM in Waskaganish, Quebec
- CJSE-FM-1 in Memramcook, New Brunswick
- CJUC-FM in Whitehorse, Yukon
- CKAJ-FM in Saguenay, Quebec
- CKBE-FM in Montreal, Quebec
- CKBI-FM-1 in Big River, Saskatchewan
- CKDQ in Drumheller, Alberta
- CKIS-FM in Toronto, Ontario
- CKJM-FM-1 in Pomquet, Nova Scotia
- CKKN-FM-1 in McLeod, British Columbia
- CKNG-FM in Edmonton, Alberta
- VF2484 in Kemess Mine, British Columbia
- VF2530 in Granisle, British Columbia
- VF2538 in Nelson, British Columbia
- VF2552 in Tofino, British Columbia

== China ==
- CNR Music Radio in Tianjin

== El Salvador ==
- YSBC at Ciudad Barrios
- YSCC at Usulután
- YSEN at Ahuachapán
- YSEU at Santa Ana
- YSIC at Chirilagua
- YSIR at La Unión
- YSLK at Cuisnahuat
- YSLL at Acajutla
- YSNG at Nueva Guadalupe
- YSQQ at San Salvador
- YSRN at Jalacatal
- YSSA at Sonsonate
- YSSR at Santa Rosa de Lima
- YSTT at Chinameca
- YSVG at San Francisco Gotera

== Indonesia ==
- RRI Programa 3 in Surabaya, East Java

== Israel ==
- Kan Moreshet in Safed

== Japan ==
- NHK Radio 1 in Sukumo, Kochi

== Malaysia ==
- Radio Klasik in Kuala Terengganu, Terengganu

== Mexico ==
- XHANS-FM in Bahía Asunción, Baja California Sur
- XHCCAU-FM in Durango, Durango
- XHEFO-FM in Chihuahua, Chihuahua
- XHETD-FM in Tecuala, Nayarit
- XHFRT-FM in Comitán de Dominguez, Chiapas
- XHGQ-FM in Los Reyes de Salgado, Michoacán
- XHGX-FM in Cuartel de Pozos, Guanajuato
- XHIC-FM in Campeche, Campeche
- XHLMS-FM in Los Mochis, Sinaloa
- XHPCHI-FM in Chilpancingo, Guerrero
- XHPEDM-FM in Cuatro Ciénegas, Coahuila
- XHPJOS-FM in José María Morelos, Quintana Roo
- XHPK-FM in Pachuca, Hidalgo
- XHQRV-FM in Veracruz (El Pando), Veracruz
- XHRJ-FM in Toluca, Estado de México
- XHRM-FM in Tijuana, Baja California
- XHRRT-FM in Tampico, Tamaulipas
- XHSAG-FM in Salamanca, Guanajuato
- XHSCFI-FM in San Lorenzo Cacaotepec, Oaxaca
- XHSIBG-FM in Júpare, Huatabampo Municipality, Sonora
- XHSRO-FM in Monterrey, Nuevo León
- XHTR-FM in Villahermosa, Tabasco
- XHUU-FM in Colima, Colima
- XHZM-FM in Puebla, Puebla

== New Zealand ==
- Radio New Zealand Concert in Wellington

== Philippines ==
- DXKG in Koronadal
- DXAA in Dipolog
- DXEZ in General Santos

== Serbia ==
- Play Radio at Belgrade

== Turkey ==
- TRT-2 at Adana

== United States (Channel 223) ==
- KAAR in Butte, Montana
- KAYX in Richmond, Missouri
- KBEB in Sacramento, California
- KBEY in Burnet, Texas
- KBXI in Park City, Montana
- KCAN-LP in Needles, California
- KCOL in Groves, Texas
- KCRT-FM in Trinidad, Colorado
- KCUA in Maeser, Utah
- KCVT in Silver Lake, Kansas
- KFDS-FM in Mountain Grove, Missouri
- KFGD-LP in Fresno, California
- KGEL-LP in Jasper, Oregon
- KGYS-LP in Dewitt, Iowa
- KHCL in Arcadia, Louisiana
- KHGF-LP in Houston, Texas
- KHTA in Wake Village, Texas
- KIVE-LP in Aurora, Nebraska
- KJID-LP in Tyler, Texas
- KJJG-LP in South Houston, Texas
- KJJY in West Des Moines, Iowa
- KKAL in Paso Robles, California
- KKHA in Markham, Texas
- KKSE-FM in Broomfield, Colorado
- KKWQ in Warroad, Minnesota
- KLAD-FM in Klamath Falls, Oregon
- KLHI in Kahului, Hawaii
- KMAC-LP in Muscatine, Iowa
- KMWX in Abilene, Texas
- KMXW in Douglas, Wyoming
- KMYX in Arvin, California
- KMZR in Atwater, California
- KNKJ-LP in Red Bluff, California
- KOMA (FM) in Oklahoma City, Oklahoma
- KOWS-LP in Occidental, California
- KPPL in Poplar Bluff, Missouri
- KPQX in Havre, Montana
- KPRV-FM in Heavener, Oklahoma
- KQLH-LP in Yucaipa, California
- KQMA in Phillipsburg, Kansas
- KQMV in Bellevue, Washington
- KQRS in Golden Valley, Minnesota
- KRPT in Devine, Texas
- KRWN in Farmington, New Mexico
- KSJC-LP in Silverton, Colorado
- KSMR in Winona, Minnesota
- KSRW (FM) in Independence, California
- KSYN in Joplin, Missouri
- KTHQ in Eagar, Arizona
- KTWB in Sioux Falls, South Dakota
- KUUU in South Jordan, Utah
- KVLR in Sunset Valley, Texas
- KVPI-FM in Ville Platte, Louisiana
- KWIX-FM in Cairo, Missouri
- KWQR in Willcox, Arizona
- KWUP in Navasota, Texas
- KWYN-FM in Wynne, Arkansas
- KXJX-LP in Clinton, Iowa
- KXKK in Park Rapids, Minnesota
- KXXE in San Augustine, Texas
- KYVD-LP in Yuma, Arizona
- KZHR in Dayton, Washington
- KZPS in Dallas, Texas
- WAIW in Winchester, Virginia
- WAJB-LP in Wellston, Ohio
- WBEE in Rochester, New York
- WBGV in Marlette, Michigan
- WBKR in Owensboro, Kentucky
- WBLH in Black River, New York
- WCKN in Moncks Corner, South Carolina
- WCLR in DeKalb, Illinois
- WDJQ in Alliance, Ohio
- WDKM in Poultney, Vermont
- WEFA-LP in Ocala, Florida
- WEIM-LP in West Liberty, Kentucky
- WEKS in Zebulon, Georgia
- WESC in Greenville, South Carolina
- WESE in Baldwyn, Mississippi
- WFDX in Atlanta, Michigan
- WFSX-FM in Estero, Florida
- WGVV-LP in Rock Island, Illinois
- WIBF in Mexico, Pennsylvania
- WIRN in Buhl, Minnesota
- WISY-LP in Black Earth, Wisconsin
- WJJQ in Tomahawk, Wisconsin
- WJSZ in Ashley, Michigan
- WJXL in Jacksonville Beach, Florida
- WKGB in Conklin, New York
- WKXQ (FM) in Rushville, Illinois
- WKZZ in Tifton, Georgia
- WLCJ-LP in Marinette, Wisconsin
- WMBZ (FM) in West Bend, Wisconsin
- WNDD in Alachua, Florida
- WNKZ-FM in Pocomoke City, Maryland
- WOFX in Cincinnati, Ohio
- WORO in Corozal, Puerto Rico
- WPAP in Panama City, Florida
- WQMU in Indiana, Pennsylvania
- WQST in Forest, Mississippi
- WQYZ in Ocean Springs, Mississippi
- WRBP-LP in Wisconsin Rapids, Wisconsin
- WREE in Urbana, Illinois
- WRYC in Frisco City, Alabama
- WSAB-LP in Jamestown, Tennessee
- WTHM-LP in Ravenswood, West Virginia
- WVKS in Toledo, Ohio
- WVNN in Trinity, Alabama
- WWPV-LP in Colchester, Vermont
- WWSN in Newaygo, Michigan
- WWYZ in Waterbury, Connecticut
- WXRV in Andover, Massachusetts
- WXTU in Philadelphia, Pennsylvania
- WYDE-FM in Cordova, Alabama
- WYFL in Henderson, North Carolina
- WYRF-LP in Florence, South Carolina
- WYUU in Safety Harbor, Florida
- WZAC-FM in Danville, West Virginia
- WZUU in Mattawan, Michigan
- WZWZ in Kokomo, Indiana

== Vietnam ==
- Binh Duong radio, Binh Duong province
