= 99.5 FM =

FM radio frequency

The following radio stations broadcast on FM frequency 99.5 MHz:

== Argentina ==
- Blu Radio in San Juan
- Cordillerana in San Martín de los Andes, Neuquen
- De la ciudad in Tornquist, Buenos Aires
- LRM748 Del Siglo in Rosario, Santa Fe
- Estilo in Posadas, Misiones
- Frecuencia Romántica in Villa Mercedes, San Luis
- Imagen in Comandante Luis Piedra Buena, Santa Cruz
- La Arena in Santa Rosa, La Pampa
- Mágica in El Quebrachal, Salta
- Maza in San Miguel, Buenos Aires
- Mega San Luis in San Luis
- País in Perico, Jujuy
- Radiovision in Comodoro Rivadavia, Chubut
- Radio María in Coronel Pringles, Buenos Aires
- Radio María in La Plata, Buenos Aires
- Radio María in Tandil, Buenos Aires
- Radio María in Monte Buey, Córdoba
- Radio María in La Rioja
- Sophia FM in Salta
- Universal Pedro Luro in Pedro Luro, Buenos Aires
- Zumba la turba in Córdoba

== Australia ==
- ABC Western Plains in Mudgee, New South Wales
- Radio National in Grafton, New South Wales
- 4RGC in Cairns, Queensland
- Triple J in Mackay, Queensland
- 3GPH in Geelong, Victoria
- TRFM in Latrobe Valley, Victoria
- TRFM in Sale, Victoria
- Star FM (Australia) in Mildura, Victoria

== Canada (Channel 258) ==
- CBAN-FM in Edmundston, New Brunswick
- CBCV-FM-1 in Metchosin/Sooke, British Columbia
- CBZF-FM in Fredericton, New Brunswick
- CBZF-FM-1 in McAdam, New Brunswick
- CFBE-FM in Baie James, Quebec
- CFBG-FM in Bracebridge, Ontario
- CHOO-FM in Drumheller, Alberta
- CHRL-FM in Roberval, Quebec
- CIML-FM in Makkovik, Newfoundland and Labrador
- CIMM-FM in Ucluelet, British Columbia
- CJBC-2-FM in Kingston, Ontario
- CJPX-FM in Montreal, Quebec
- CKBZ-FM-3 in Merritt, British Columbia
- CFCA-FM in Kitchener, Ontario
- CKSB-8-FM in Brandon, Manitoba
- CKTY-FM in Truro, Nova Scotia
- CKUA-FM-12 in Spirit River, Alberta
- VF2397 in Weyburn, Saskatchewan
- VF2499 in Saskatoon, Saskatchewan
- VOAR-2-FM in Marystown, Newfoundland and Labrador

== China ==
- CNR The Voice of China in Zhangjiakou
- Huiyang People's Radio

== Malaysia ==
- Hot FM in Seremban, Negeri Sembilan

== Mexico ==
- XHAF-FM in Celaya, Guanajuato
- XHCSHY-FM in Río Grande, Zacatecas
- XHDR-FM in Guaymas, Sonora
- XHEZZZ-FM in Tapachula, Chiapas
- XHFEM-FM in Hermosillo, Sonora
- XHGZ-FM in Gómez Palacio, Durango
- XHLS-FM in Guadalajara, Jalisco
- XHMAT-FM in Mazatlán, Sinaloa
- XHMS-FM in Monclova, Coahuila
- XHRTM-FM in Macuspana, Tabasco
- XHSBT-FM in San Buenaventura, Chihuahua
- XHSMT-FM in Santa María Tecomavaca, Oaxaca
- XHTGM-FM in Tangancícuaro, Michoacán
- XHTVR-FM in Tuxpan, Veracruz
- XHUATX-FM in Tlaxcala, Tlaxcala
- XHUZH-FM in Zimapán, Hidalgo

== Philippines ==
- DWRT-FM in Metro Manila
- DYRT-FM in Cebu City
- DXBT in Davao City
- DXLA -FM in Zamboanga City
- DWCM-FM in Legazpi City
- DWHP-FM in Laoag City
- DYRF-FM in Iloilo City

== United Kingdom ==
- BBC Radio 1 in Glasgow, Scotland

== United States (Channel 258) ==
- KADI in Republic, Missouri
- KAKS in Goshen, Arkansas
- KAPL-FM in Rock Island, Washington
- KBHW in International Falls, Minnesota
- KBIJ in Guymon, Oklahoma
- KBLL in Helena, Montana
- KBTA-FM in Batesville, Arkansas
- KBZQ in Lawton, Oklahoma
- KCAZ in Rough Rock, Arizona
- KCPH-LP in Corpus Christi, Texas
- KDAO in Eldora, Iowa
- KDIS in Little Rock, Arkansas
- KDJL in Kilgore, Nebraska
- KETT in Mitchell, Nebraska
- KFNP-LP in North Pole, Alaska
- KFSL-LP in Fossil, Oregon
- KFXX-FM in Klamath Falls, Oregon
- KGU-FM in Honolulu, Hawaii
- KHAZ in Hays, Kansas
- KHCR in Bismarck, Missouri
- KHDL in Americus, Kansas
- KHEA-LP in La Marque, Texas
- KHMB in Hamburg, Arkansas
- KIIM in Tucson, Arizona
- KISS in San Antonio, Texas
- KJKQ in Sisseton, South Dakota
- KJMX in Reedsport, Oregon
- KJMY in Bountiful, Utah
- KKLA in Los Angeles, California
- KKMA in Le Mars, Iowa
- KKPS in Brownsville, Texas
- KKTU-FM in Fallon, Nevada
- KLHQ in Hotchkiss, Colorado
- KLOK in Greenfield, California
- KLXI in Fruitland, Idaho
- KMCJ in Colstrip, Montana
- KMGA in Albuquerque, New Mexico
- KMRJ in Rancho Mirage, California
- KMTB in Murfreesboro, Arkansas
- KNFX in Bryan, Texas
- KNGT in Lake Charles, Louisiana
- KNTI in Lakeport, California
- KOHV-LP in Houston, Texas
- KOLY in Mobridge, South Dakota
- KPLX in Fort Worth, Texas
- KPRW in Perham, Minnesota
- KQBR in Lubbock, Texas
- KQMT in Denver, Colorado
- KQTC in Christoval, Texas
- KRKI in Keystone, South Dakota
- KRPH in Morristown, Arizona
- KRYI-LP in Yuba City, California
- KSAI in Citrus Heights, California
- KSIQ-LP in St. Louis, Missouri
- KSJN in Minneapolis, Minnesota
- KTWH-LP in Two Harbors, Minnesota
- KUTT in Fairbury, Nebraska
- KVLJ-LP in Victoria, Texas
- KVRY-LP in Santa Barbara, California
- KWJJ in Portland, Oregon
- KWSQ-LP in Mesa, Arizona
- KXBL in Henryetta, Oklahoma
- KXFB-LP in Fallbrook, California
- KXGO in Willow Creek, California
- KXPZ in Las Cruces, New Mexico
- KZDV in Rattan, Oklahoma
- KZGU in Garapan-Saipan, Northern Mariana Islands
- KZLY in Ione, Oregon
- KZZL in Pullman, Washington
- WAIL in Key West, Florida
- WAOL in Ripley, Ohio
- WBAI in New York, New York
- WBDY-LP in Binghamton, New York
- WBUJ-LP in Miami Shores, Florida
- WBUS in Centre Hall, Pennsylvania
- WBYG in Point Pleasant, West Virginia
- WCOY in Quincy, Illinois
- WCRB in Lowell, Massachusetts
- WDCX in Buffalo, New York
- WDZN in Midland, Maryland
- WEVJ in Jackson, New Hampshire
- WFPM-LP in Battle Creek, Michigan
- WGAR in Cleveland, Ohio
- WHGV in LaCrosse, Florida
- WHIM-LP in Hialeah Gardens, Florida
- WIHT in Washington, District of Columbia
- WJCX in Pittsfield, Maine
- WJLS in Beckley, West Virginia
- WKAA in Willacoochee, Georgia
- WKDP in Corbin, Kentucky
- WKDQ in Henderson, Kentucky
- WKSM in Fort Walton Beach, Florida
- WKXC in Aiken, South Carolina
- WLLY-FM in Clewiston, Florida
- WLOV-FM in Daytona Beach Shores, Florida
- WMAG in High Point, North Carolina
- WMJV in Grifton, North Carolina
- WMKK-LP in Richmond, Kentucky
- WNGE in Negaunee, Michigan
- WOKN in Southport, New York
- WPKR in Omro, Wisconsin
- WPSB-LP in Ocean City, Maryland
- WQAT-LP in Belton, South Carolina
- WQYK in Saint Petersburg, Florida
- WRNN in Socastee, South Carolina
- WRNO in New Orleans, Louisiana
- WRVE in Schenectady, New York
- WSEF-LP in Dalton, Georgia
- WTKW in Bridgeport, New York
- WUSN in Chicago, Illinois
- WUSR in Scranton, Pennsylvania
- WVCW in Wilmington, Delaware
- WVIQ in Christiansted, Virgin Islands
- WYCD in Detroit, Michigan
- WYGO in Madisonville, Tennessee
- WYMJ in New Martinsville, West Virginia
- WYSS in Sault Sainte Marie, Michigan
- WYTT in Emporia, Virginia
- WZIM in Lexington, Illinois
- WZPL in Greenfield, Indiana
- WZRR in Birmingham, Alabama
