= XHFAC-FM =

Radio station in Salvatierra, Guanajuato, Mexico

- Salvatierra, Guanajuato; Mexico
- Frequency: 92.9 FM
- Branding: Fiesta Mexicana

Programming
- Format: Regional Mexican

Ownership
- Owner: Grupo Radiorama; (Imagen Radiofónica, S.A. de C.V.)
- Sister stations: XHBO-FM, XHSD-FM, XHGTO-FM, XHOO-FM

History
- First air date: April 1, 1970 (concession)
- Former frequencies: 1290 AM; 1380 AM
- Call sign meaning: Felipe Arizaga Castillo

Technical information
- Class: AA
- ERP: 6 kW
- Transmitter coordinates: 20°15′26″N 100°53′17″W

Links
- Webcast: Listen live
- Website: bienydefiesta.com

XHFAC-FM is a radio station on 92.9 FM in Salvatierra, Guanajuato. XHFAC is owned by Grupo Radiorama, carrying its Fiesta Mexicana Regional Mexican format.

== History ==
XHFAC began as XEFAC-AM. The station, named for original concessionaire Felipe Arizaga Castillo, received its concession on April 1, 1970 and operated as a daytimer on 1380 kHz. In the 1980s, it was moved to 1290 in order to begin nighttime service and increase its daytime power to 5 kW.

In 2012, XEFAC was cleared to migrate to FM on 92.9 MHz. In 2015, it also applied to build an emergency transmitter at its site in Salvatierra.

On March 9, 2020, XHFAC-FM temporarily became part of Multimedios Radio with the La Lupe Regional Mexican format.

XHFAC-FM was later acquired by Grupo Radiorama and flipped to Fiesta Mexicana.
