= History of the University of Scranton =

Coordinates: 41.406°N 75.657°W

The History of the University of Scranton began with its founding as a diocesan college by Bishop William O’Hara in 1888. After 1897 it was run by the De La Salle Brothers for 45 years, until in 1942 it became the twenty-second college run by the Society of Jesus in the United States. This article elaborates on the succinct history found at University of Scranton.

== History ==
=== Founding of the University ===
In 1888, the University of Scranton was founded as the College of St. Thomas of Aquin in honor of St. Thomas Aquinas by the first bishop of Scranton, Most Rev. William O’Hara. Shortly after, the College was renamed as St. Thomas College. After four years of intense fundraising, construction was completed on the College's first building, Old Main (also known as College Hall). The three-story red brick building, located in the city of Scranton on Wyoming Avenue next to St. Peter's Cathedral and the Bishop's residence, housed eight large classrooms on the first and second floors, an auditorium/gymnasium on the third floor, and a chapel in the basement.

In September 1892, the College admitted its first students, 62 young men, for an annual tuition cost of $40. Bishop O’Hara appointed Rev. John J. Mangan as the College's first president. For four years, the college was staffed by Scranton's diocesan priests and seminarians. and from 1896 until 1897, the College was run by the three Xaverian Brothers.

=== The Christian Brothers ===
After the Xaverian Brothers left, the Lasallian Christian Brothers, a religious teaching congregation founded by St. Jean-Baptiste de la Salle, took responsibility for the administration of St. Thomas College, although the College was still owned by the Diocese of Scranton. The Christian Brothers ran the College for forty-five years, until they transferred governorship of the College to the Society of Jesuits in 1942. Once the Christian Brothers arrived, they reorganized St. Thomas College into three separate divisions. They created a four-year college (which would become the undergraduate College of Arts and Sciences), a commercial department which offered two-year degree programs, and a preparatory high school.

In 1938, the Christian Brothers renamed St. Thomas "The University of Scranton" and also began admitting women, but only in the evening college. In the 1920s a few women had been permitted to enroll, including Marywood College student Nellie Brown who took a course required for entrance into medical school.

By the beginning of 1942 Bishop Hafey had come to recognize that the Brothers’ first priority in assigning their manpower went to those schools, like La Salle College in Philadelphia, which they not only administered, but also owned. In February he made an overture to the Society of Jesus inviting them to assume not merely the University's administration, but its ownership (including its debts) as well, an offer they accepted in May. After the University's commencement in June, the Bishop and the Christian Brothers announced that the University of Scranton would become a Jesuit University.

==== Early Building Upgrades by the Christian Brothers ====
In 1941 Bishop William J. Hafey had acquired Dr. Charles E. Thomson's Scranton Private Hospital as part of his plan to expand the University. But this plan for "the Annex" was undercut by the lessened enrollment during the War. After the 1944 establishment of the Scranton Preparatory School by the Jesuit President of the University, the Very Rev. W. Coleman Nevils, the Annex served as its home until it was demolished in 1961 and the Preparatory School changed locations. Additionally, in 1941, Worthington Scranton donated his home and adjoining estate to Bishop Hafey, the bishop of the Diocese of Scranton and the University of Scranton's Board of Trustees President, for use by the University, because he felt that this land could be "most advantageously used for the development of an institution of higher learning so that the youth of this vicinity can get an education at a reasonable cost." The Christian Brothers, because of their strained finances and the University's low enrollment did not make use of the Scranton Estate before their departure.

=== Establishment of Degree Programs ===
In 1899, St. Thomas College held its first Commencement, awarding certificates to graduates of the College's two-year commercial program. In 1901, the first four graduates of the college department of St. Thomas were awarded Bachelor of Science degrees. Because the College had not received a state charter, it could not grant official degrees under its own name. Instead, the Christian Brothers began an affiliation with Rock Hill College in Maryland. Until 1925, when the College was given a state charter, all St. Thomas College degrees were awarded either by Rock Hill, LaSalle College in Philadelphia, or St. John's College in Washington, D.C.

In 1924, St. Thomas College was granted a state charter by the Lackawanna County Court of Common Pleas. This incorporation enabled the College finally to award its own collegiate degrees: Bachelor of Science, Bachelor of Arts, and Master of Arts. In June 1925, 34 students received the first baccalaureate diplomas bearing the seal of St. Thomas College. In 1926, St. Thomas students created the school's first student body government, composed of the Student Board, Student Council, and Student Tribunal. The College received accreditation from the Association of Colleges and Secondary Schools of the Middle States and Maryland in 1927, after successfully passing the board's evaluation process and meeting its quality standards.

=== Historic Impacts on Enrolment ===
During World War I, enrollment plunged as young, college-aged men enlisted and joined the war effort. As a result, the College temporarily suspended the four year college degree programs from 1918 until 1920. During this period, however, St. Thomas continued to offer its two-year commercial programs as well as a program for premedical students.

During the Great Depression, enrollment dropped and the Christian Brothers struggled to maintain and run the College. This trend worsened during World War II as potential students joined the war effort, and the school's debt increased.

=== The Society of Jesus ===
In June 1942, eighteen members of the Society of Jesus arrived in Scranton, led by Rev. W. Coleman Nevils, the new University President and Rector of the Jesuit community. Because the former Christian Brothers residence on Wyoming Ave. next to Old Main could not accommodate all of the Jesuits, they moved into the Estate, which had been donated by the Scranton family in 1941. While the Jesuits began using the lower Hill Section campus, all classes and offices remained at Old Main. During World War II, enrollment remained low. In order to offset declines in enrollment, the University created an aviation program that trained aviation cadets for the Army Air Corps and the Navy. Beginning in 1942, the regular four-year course was accelerated and converted into a three-year degree program, done by eliminating summer vacation and reducing holidays, to more quickly prepare graduates for military service. In 1943, the University founded its chapter of Alpha Sigma Nu, the National Jesuit Society founded at Marquette University in 1915.

In 1941, Bishop William J. Hafey acquired Dr. Charles E. Thomson's Scranton Private Hospital, called the Annex, on the corner of Wyoming Avenue and Mulberry Street for the University just as enrollment dropped with the beginning of U.S. involvement with the Second World War in Europe. As a result, the University did not need to use the building and it sat unused for the next three years. In 1944, responding to requests from both the diocese and Catholic parents in the Scranton area for a college preparatory school, the Jesuits created Scranton Preparatory School. The Annex served as the high school's home until 1961 when it was demolished. The school used The University's former building, Old Main, for a couple of years before moving to its present location at 1000 Wyoming Ave. Although the Prep's staff and operation were for the most part distinct from the University, it was owned by the University and under its corporate control until the Prep became a separate corporation in 1978.

Once the Jesuits arrived at the University, they also began making gradual changes to the University's curriculum and required courses so that the school's courses would conform as much as possible to the traditional Jesuit education. The Dean instituted the standards used in all Jesuit schools. One of the biggest and most immediate changes to the curriculum occurred in philosophy. During their tenure as administrators of the University, the Christian Brothers had no emphasized philosophy and offered only a few courses on the subject. In contrast, the Jesuits instituted a heavy courseload of philosophy. In keeping with their long-established emphasis on scholastic philosophy, a prescribed sequence of courses covering logic, cosmology, metaphysics, epistemology and ethics was required of all students, regardless of major. Several of these courses came to be either 4- or 5-credit courses after the war, so that by the 1950s students commonly were taking twenty-four or more credits in philosophy alone. Additionally, over time, they added courses and majors to the curriculum, as well as general education requirements for all students in order to create a well-rounded education for students. In particular, the Jesuits placed importance on rhetoric, public speaking, history, and the classical languages of Greek and Latin.

In 1945, with the end of the war and the creation of the G.I. Bill, legislation intended to help veterans reintegrate after the war which included cash payments for college tuition, enrollment exploded. In order to accommodate this dramatic increase in enrollment, the University acquired three former Navy barracks in 1947 which they constructed on the 900 block of Linden Street, part of the former Scranton Estate. For the next fifteen years, Scranton's campus would be divided between Old Main and the former Christian Brothers’ residence, which had been renamed by the Jesuits as La Salle Hall, on Wyoming Ave. and the three barracks at the Scranton Estate. Administrative offices and the pre-med program were housed in Old Main while the arts and sciences, business, and engineering divisions held classes in the naval barracks.

In 1950, the University opened a Graduate School. Its first graduate program was created by the Department of Education and Psychology, leading to a Master of Arts degree in Education. Two years later, it awarded its first degrees. Graduate programs in other fields including Business Administration and Chemistry followed soon afterward. Over time, the Graduate School continued to grow, adding programs in History and English. From its creation, the graduate program admitted women, like the University's Evening School and summer courses, which had educated women since 1938. The University's Army Reserve Officer Training Corps unit was established in 1951, with its first graduates produced in 1955 as second lieutenants in either the Army or the Reserves. The basic, two-year ROTC program was mandatory for all physically qualified incoming freshmen, except those veterans who had already served. The advanced ROTC program for juniors and seniors was optional, though competitive and selective.

=== The Decade of the Builder ===
In 1955, the University announced an ambitious $5,000,000 campus expansion plan, which proposed constructing ten new buildings over the course of the next ten years. The school hoped to move all of its operations to the Scranton Estate, replace the barracks with safer and more permanent buildings, and expand its facilities to better serve its growing student body. The University's expansion began with the construction of the Loyola Hall of Science in 1956, which was home to the departments of engineering, physics, biology, and chemistry as well as the University's radio station (WUSR) and replaced one of the navy barracks, the E (Engineering) Building. In 1958, the University built its first dorms for residential students. It created four dorms arranged in a quad, providing housing for 200 students: Casey, Fitch, Martin, and McCourt Halls. Only three years after their completion, Scranton added another quad of four residential halls above it: Denis Edward, Hafey, Lynett, and Hannan Halls.

The campus also grew through an acquisition in 1958. When Worthington Scranton had donated his family's estate to the University, he had reserved the former carriage house, which he had converted into an office, the greenhouse, and the squash court for his own personal use. Following his death in 1958, his son, William W. Scranton, gave the remainder of the Estate to the University of Scranton. After obtaining the rest of the property, the University moved its administrative offices from Old Main into the carriage house. Although the University had originally planned to convert the Estate into a library, the plans were dropped in favor of a more feasible idea: building an entirely new, separate structure. Alumni Memorial Library was completed in 1960, holding over 120,000 library volumes and containing study space for up to 475 students. In 1961, the University completed construction of the Gunster Memorial Student Center. The center of campus life, at the time of its dedication, Gunster housed a cafeteria, the University bookstore, the 400-seat Eagen Auditorium, lounges, a game room, and a rifle range.

The final major construction project of the era was creating a classroom building to replace the rest of the navy barracks. Constructed at the corner of Linden and Monroe Streets, St. Thomas Hall was completed in 1962. Five stories tall, the modern L-shaped building contained classrooms, administrative and faculty offices, ROTC offices, student lounges, the St. Ignatius Loyola Chapel, and four laboratories. After the completion of St. Thomas Hall, the University vacated its Wyoming Avenue properties completely. During the dedication ceremony for the new classroom building, the original cornerstone from the University's first building, Old Main, was built into the front corner of St. Thomas Hall. Seventy five years after Old Main's blessing in 1888, the University of Scranton transferred its cornerstone to the new campus, linking the University with its past and providing continuity from both the University's former name, St. Thomas College, and its old campus. The decade of construction ended with the completion of three additional buildings that had been in the planning stages during his presidency. The University added two more residential halls: Driscoll and Nevils, which together housed 240 students, increasing the University's dormitory capacity to 650 residents in 1965. The University completed construction on its first varsity athletic center in 1967, which the school named in honor of its former president, John J. Long, S.J., who had led the University in its first major building campaign.

=== Changing times ===
In the late 1960s, students at the University of Scranton became politically active and organized protests against the Vietnam War. The students also began opposing long-standing "in loco parentis" policies, a system in which the school regulated student life through a dress code, dormitory checks, curfews, and parietals.

Through their activism, students achieved a loosening of restrictions. Since the Reserve Officers Training Corps (ROTC) was established at the University of Scranton in 1951, participation in the program had been mandatory for freshmen and sophomores. This policy was made completely voluntary in 1969. In 1969, the administration also revised its position on drinking on campus, from a complete prohibition on the consumption of alcohol on campus regardless of age to allowing students of legal age to drink in their dormitories. The dress code, which had required students to wear a jacket and tie to class, was abolished. Daily dormitory checks for freshmen and sophomores at 7:00 p.m. and 11:00 p.m. on weeknights and 1:30 a.m. on the weekends were reorganized so that only students with failing grades were bound by a revised checks system, requiring curfew at 11:00 p.m. on weeknights. The last change to in loco parentis policies concerned parietals, rules regulating the presence of members of the opposite sex in dormitories. Beginning in 1968, students demanded the creation of a visitation policy so women could visit men students. Finally, in 1970, visitation was approved, allowing females into the dormitories until 10:00 p.m. on weekdays and until 2:00 a.m. on weekends.

The desire for change spread throughout all levels of the University community, as faculty and administrators began to push for changes, although of a different kind. In 1966, the University of Scranton established a representative faculty assembly, called the University Senate. The University Senate served as an advisory body to the Board of Trustees, charged with submitting recommendations and resolutions regarding changes in University policy. Later, membership was also extended to students. The University decided to revise its curriculum, which had remained virtually the same since the Jesuits had arrived in 1942. The amended curriculum, approved in November 1970, offered students greater choice and flexibility by changing the general education requirements to allow students to select courses from a range of options rather than specifying particular courses. It required between thirty and thirty-six credits within the student's major, twenty-four credits in cognate courses outside of the major but in related disciplines, and sixty-seven credits in general education areas, including Natural Sciences and Analytical Studies, Social and Behavioral Sciences, Philosophy and Theology, Communications, and Humanities. During this time period, the University also completely reorganized its board of trustees through a process called disincorporation, a transferral of governing authority from religious communities to a board of trustees with no direct affiliation to the institution. Since the Jesuits had assumed control of Scranton in 1942, the board had been composed entirely of Jesuits from the Scranton Jesuit Community. During 1969 and 1970, an entirely new board was appointed so that it became composed of Jesuits from outside institutions, prominent members of the local community, and the President of the University.

On May 31, 1987, Margaret Heckler, the then United States Ambassador to Ireland, became the first woman to deliver the commencement address at the University of Scranton in the school's history.

== Future of the university ==
On April 26, 2008, the university held a public launch of its new fundraising campaign. The campaign includes the DeNaples Center, The Dionne Green, Condron Hall, renovations to the Estate as a new home for admissions and the development of a new science facility. Other campaign priorities include building endowment for financial aid, scholarships and faculty development and growing support in annual giving.

On October 26, 2009, the university began construction on a new science/humanities facility, the Loyola Science Center.

On May 6, 2010, the university announced plans to build a new apartment style Residence Hall with a food option as well as a new fitness facility on the first floor. This will be located across the street from the DeNaples Center on the 900 block of Mulberry Street.

On August 30, 2010, President Scott Pilarz, S.J. announced that he would leave the university at the end of the academic year to become the president of Marquette University.

On December 15, 2010, Christopher "Kip" Condron announced that Kevin Quinn, S.J. would become the 25th President of the University of Scranton. Quinn is originally from New York, a graduate of Fordham University and was, prior to his appointment, the executive director of the Ignatian Center for Jesuit Education at Santa Clara University, where he was also a professor of law.

In fall 2011, Scranton welcomed two new facilities to the city's skyline: the Loyola Science Center and an apartment and fitness complex on the 900 block of Mulberry Street.

The 200,000-square-foot science center is home to 22 class and seminar rooms, 34 laboratories, and a multistory atrium, and it functions as a center for collaborative learning for all members of the campus and community.

The apartment and fitness complex, which consists of the Rev. Scott R. Pilarz, S.J., Hall and Montrone Hall, stands directly across the street from the Patrick and Margaret DeNaples Center and provides fitness space, a dining area and apartment-style units to accommodate 400 juniors and seniors.

Edward R. Leahy Jr. Hall, which houses the departments of physical therapy, occupational therapy and exercise science, was dedicated in September 2015.

In these early years of the 21st century, the University is building on its historical and educational heritage guided by its "Engaged, Integrated, Global" strategic plan for 2015–2020. This plan guides the University's efforts in ever-improving the education and formation of students in the Catholic, Jesuit educational tradition through learning experiences that are transformative and reflective. Integrated teaching and learning opportunities across disciplines and programs emphasize understanding, discernment and action in a global context.
