= XHZN-FM =

XHZN-FM may refer to:

- XHZN-FM (Guanajuato) in Celaya, Exa 104.5 FM and 780 AM
- XHZN-FM (Michoacán) in Zamora, Los 40 88.1 FM
