= KSJC =

KSJC may refer to:

- KSJC-LP, a low-power radio station (92.5 FM) licensed to Silverton, Colorado, United States
- Norman Y. Mineta San Jose International Airport, an airport in San Jose, California (ICAO code KSJC; IATA code SJC)
  - not to be confused with Juan Santamaría International Airport in San José, Costa Rica (ICAO code MROC; IATA code SJO)
