= XHQRV-FM =

Radio station in Veracruz, Veracruz, Mexico

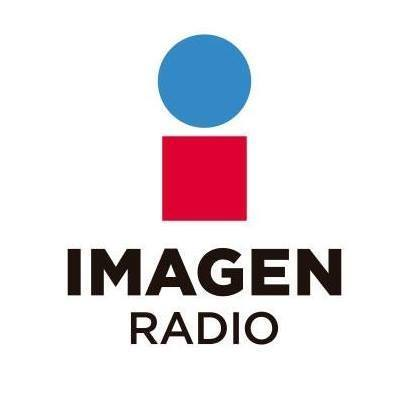
- Veracruz, Veracruz; Mexico
- Frequency: 92.5 FM
- Branding: Imagen Radio

Programming
- Format: News/talk

Ownership
- Owner: Grupo Imagen; (Imagen Radio Comercial, S.A. de C.V.)

History
- First air date: February 17, 1972 (concession)
- Former call signs: XEJPM-AM, XEQRV-AM
- Former frequencies: 1510 kHz, 770 kHz

Technical information
- Licensing authority: CRT
- Class: B1
- ERP: 25,000 watts
- HAAT: 69.40 m
- Transmitter coordinates: 19°10′35″N 96°08′14″W

Links
- Webcast: Listen live
- Website: imagenveracruz.mx

XHQRV-FM is a radio station on 92.5 FM in Veracruz, Veracruz, Mexico, carrying the news and talk programs of Imagen Radio.

== History ==
XHQRV was owned by Ultra until 2015

In 1972, XEJPM-AM 1510 received its concession. The station broadcast from Villa Cardel as a daytimer with 500 watts and took its calls from its original concessionaire and owner, José Pinto Meneses.

The 1980s were an eventful decade for XEJPM that saw almost every characteristic of the station change. In 1982, Radio Costera, S.A., acquired XEJPM. In 1984, the callsign was changed to XEQRV-AM. This was followed in 1986 by the relocation of XEQRV to El Pando, along with a frequency change to 770 kHz, as well as an increase in power to 1,000 watts and the beginning of nighttime operation with 500 watts. In 1989, daytime power was ramped up further, to 5,000 watts. These power levels remained through the AM-FM migration.

Until 2015, XHQRV carried a pop format known as Ultra. Imagen acquired XHQRV in 2015 and flipped the station to its Imagen Radio format.

Logo used from 2015 to the Imagen corporate redesign of 2016
