= XHCPAK-FM =

Radio station in Campeche, Campeche, Mexico

- Campeche, Campeche; Mexico
- Broadcast area: Campeche
- Frequency: 105.1 MHz
- Branding: Radio IC

Programming
- Format: Public radio

Ownership
- Owner: Instituto Campechano

History
- First air date: 1997; 2022
- Former call signs: XEIC-AM, XHIC-FM
- Former frequencies: 810 kHz (1997–2013); 92.5 MHz (2013–2016)

Technical information
- Class: A
- ERP: 2.551 kW
- HAAT: 23.8 m (78 ft)
- Transmitter coordinates: 19°51′04.1″N 90°31′48.4″W

Links
- Website: radio.instcamp.edu.mx

XHCPAK-FM is a Mexican radio station owned by the Instituto Campechano and located in Campeche, Campeche, Mexico.

== History ==
The Instituto Campechano received a permit to build a new AM radio station, which began test transmissions on 1580 kHz in 1997. In 1998, the station moved to its final dial position of 810 kHz and took the call sign XEIC-AM. In 2013, Cofetel authorized XEIC-AM to move to the FM band as XHIC-FM 92.5, a 25,000-watt station.

The FM station launched in 2015, but the IC failed to make a necessary legal filing. The 2014 Ley Federal de Telecomunicaciones y Radiodifusión required all noncommercial radio stations, which held permits, to apply to have them switched to concessions, but no such filing was ever made, and as a result, the station lost legal authority to operate. To rectify this omission, a new station application was necessary; this was made on April 20, 2018, and the Federal Telecommunications Institute authorized a concession for XHCPAK-FM on 105.1 MHz, a Class A station with 3,000 watts, on April 1, 2020. Test broadcasts began in January 2022.
