= XHEOF-FM =

Radio station in Cortázar, Guanajuato, Mexico

- Celaya, Guanajuato; Mexico
- Frequency: 101.9 MHz
- Branding: Exa FM

Programming
- Format: Spanish & English Top 40 (CHR)
- Affiliations: MVS Radio

Ownership
- Owner: TVR Comunicaciones (pending sale to Promomedios); (Radio XEOF-AM, S.A. de C.V.)
- Operator: Promomedios
- Sister stations: XHEFG-FM, XHZN-FM

History
- First air date: July 4, 1967 (concession)
- Former call signs: XEOF-AM
- Former frequencies: 1510 kHz, 740 kHz

Technical information
- Class: AA
- ERP: 6 kW
- Transmitter coordinates: 20°31′10.41″N 100°48′5.29″W

Links
- Webcast: Listen live
- Website: exafm.com

XHEOF-FM is a radio station on 101.9 FM in Cortázar, Guanajuato. It is owned by Promomedios and is known as Exa FM with a pop format.

== History ==
XEOF-AM received its concession on July 4, 1967. It was owned by Raúl Paniahua Bustos and broadcast on 1510 kHz. The 250-watt station was originally to be given to Edaena Carmona Tovar, but Paniahua Bustos filed a petition to deny and was ultimately awarded the concession. In 1979, control passed to Radiofónica del Centro, S.A. and power increased from 250 watts to 5,000. In the early 2000s, XEOF moved to 740 kHz.

In 2011, XEOF was approved to migrate to FM. It briefly carried the MVS Stereorey format in the early- and mid-2010s before September 2015, when XHEOF flipped and restored the Radio Juventud name once used on sister XEFG It continuous Broacasting Until June 12, 2026.

In June 17, Exa FM moved to XHEOF and XHZN adopted the brand used by XHELG-FM of León.
