= 590 AM =

AM radio frequency

The following radio stations broadcast on AM frequency 590 kHz: 590 AM is a Regional broadcast frequency.

== Argentina ==
- LRA30 in Bariloche, Río Negro.
- LS4 in Buenos Aires.
- LV12 in San Miguel de Tucumán, Tucumán.

== Brazil ==
- ZYH-445 in Salvador
- ZYH-627 in Crateús
- ZYI213 in Vitória
- ZYI-420 in Cuiabá
- ZYI-700 in Boa Vista, Roraima
- ZYJ-234 in Curitiba
- ZYK210 in Alegrete
- ZYK-534 in Santos
- ZYK-612 in Mirandópolis
- ZYK-643 in Ribeirão Preto
- ZYL-249 in João Monlevade, Minas Gerais.

== Canada ==
Call sign	City of license	Daytime power (kW)	Nighttime power (kW)	Transmitter coordinates
CFAR	Flin Flon, Manitoba	10	1	54.801111°N 101.8525°W
CFTK	Terrace, British Columbia	1	1	54.5011°N 128.516°W
CJCL	Toronto, Ontario	50	50	43.152778°N 79.534167°W
CJCW	Sussex, New Brunswick	1	0.25	45.685°N 65.523889°W
VOCM	St. John's, Newfoundland and Labrador	20	20	47.547658°N 52.783044°W

== Chile ==
- CA-059 in Antofagasta
- CC-059 in Concepción
- CD-059 in Punta Arenas

== Colombia ==
- HJCR in Medellín

== Costa Rica ==
- TIRN in San José

== Cuba ==
- CMCA in San Antonio de las Vegas
- CMMA in Guantánamo

== Dominica ==
- ZBC in Portsmouth

== Dominican Republic ==
- HIDV in La Vega

== Ecuador ==
- HCFA4 in Portoviejo

== Guatemala ==
- TGRQ in Quiche

== Honduras ==
- HRLP 9 in Juticalpa
- HRLP 8 in San Pedro Sula

== Mexico ==
- XEE-AM in Durango, Durango
- XEFD-AM in Rio Bravo, Tamaulipas
- XEGTO-AM in Guanajuato, Guanajuato
- XEPH-AM in Iztacalco, Mexico City

== Nicaragua ==
- YNRD in Cd. Sandino

== Panama ==
- HOH 3 in Chitre

== Paraguay ==
- ZP 32 in San Pedro de Ycuamandiyú

== Peru ==
- OAX4S in Lima
- OAZ8C in Pucallpa

== United States ==
Call sign	City of license	Facility ID	Class	Daytime power (kW)	Nighttime power (kW)	Unlimited power (kW)	Transmitter coordinates
KCSJ	Pueblo, Colorado	53846	B	1	1		38.358333°N 104.636944°W
KFNS	Wood River, Illinois	13505	B	1	1		38.928611°N 90.085556°W
KGLE	Glendive, Montana	11016	D	1	0.111		47.097222°N 104.785833°W
KHAR	Anchorage, Alaska	60914	B			5	61.12°N 149.895278°W
KLBJ	Austin, Texas	65791	B	5	1		30.237778°N 97.629722°W
KQNT	Spokane, Washington	60421	B			5	47.615278°N 117.249167°W
KSSK	Honolulu, Hawaii	48774	B	7.8	7.8		21.323889°N 157.875556°W
KSUB	Cedar City, Utah	61384	D	5	0.138		37.6975°N 113.181111°W (daytime); 37.697222°N 113.183056°W (nighttime)
KTIE	San Bernardino, California	58808	B	2.5	0.96		34.072222°N 117.297778°W
KUGN	Eugene, Oregon	12506	B	5	5		44.100833°N 123.051667°W
WAFC	Clewiston, Florida	24229	B	0.93	0.47		26.729444°N 80.913611°W
WARM	Scranton, Pennsylvania	70504	B	1.8	0.43		41.4775°N 75.875833°W
WCAB	Rutherfordton, North Carolina	29261	D	1	0.228		35.393056°N 81.923056°W
WDWD	Atlanta, Georgia	8623	B	12	4.5		33.845278°N 84.644444°W
WEZE	Boston, Massachusetts	3594	B			5	42.406667°N 71.087222°W
WJMS	Ironwood, Michigan	57223	D	5	0.113		46.424444°N 90.209167°W
WKZO	Kalamazoo, Michigan	54485	B	5	5		42.348611°N 85.563333°W
WLES	Bon Air, Virginia	72504	D	1	0.058		37.514444°N 77.507778°W
WMBS	Uniontown, Pennsylvania	21237	B	1	1		39.859722°N 79.745556°W
WOW	Omaha, Nebraska	50313	B	5	5		41.315278°N 95.997778°W
WROW	Albany, New York	54853	B	5	1		42.573611°N 73.786667°W
WVLK	Lexington, Kentucky	27418	B	5	1		38.111667°N 84.5775°W
WWLX	Loretto, Tennessee	53665	D	0.6	0.133		35.203333°N 87.3275°W

== Venezuela ==
- YVKL in Caracas
