= XHUTX-FM =

Radio station of the Universidad Autónoma de Tlaxcala

XHUATX-FM
- Tlaxcala City, Tlaxcala; Mexico
- Frequency: 99.5 FM
- Branding: Radio Universidad

Programming
- Format: University radio

Ownership
- Owner: Universidad Autónoma de Tlaxcala

History
- First air date: January 7, 2002
- Former call signs: XHUTX-FM (2002-2024)
- Call sign meaning: Universidad Autónoma de TlaXcala

Technical information
- ERP: 10 kW
- Transmitter coordinates: 19°20′48.49″N 98°13′28.17″W

Links
- Webcast: Listen live
- Website: radiouniversitlax.com.mx

XHUATX-FM is a radio station in Tlaxcala City, Tlaxcala, Mexico. Broadcasting on 99.5 FM from a transmitter on Cerro Ostol, XHUATX is owned by the Autonomous University of Tlaxcala and broadcasts a university radio format known as Radio Universidad.

== History ==
After obtaining its permit in July 2000, Radio Universidad officially came to air on January 7, 2002, operating from 7am to 10pm. The station currently has programming from 6am to 10pm.

In 2015, XHUTX-FM was approved for a power increase from 3 kW to 10.
