= XHRJ-FM =

Radio station in Toluca, State of Mexico

Toluca, State of Mexico; Mexico
- Frequency: 92.5 MHz
- Branding: Amor

Programming
- Format: Romantic

Ownership
- Owner: Grupo ACIR; (Corporación Radiofónica de Toluca, S.A. de C.V.)

History
- First air date: August 15, 1980 (concession)
- Call sign meaning: Reversal of Javier Ramírez

Technical information
- Class: B
- ERP: 48,336 watts
- HAAT: 26.4 m
- Transmitter coordinates: 19°14′11.51″N 99°37′55.71″W

Links
- Webcast: XHRJ-FM
- Website: amor925.mx

XHRJ-FM is a radio station in Toluca, State of Mexico. Broadcasting on 92.5 FM, XHRJ is owned by Grupo ACIR and carries its Amor romantic music format.

== History ==
XHRJ received its concession on August 15, 1980. It was owned by Javier Ramírez González until 1981, when it was sold to Corporación Radiofónica de Toluca.
