= WBDY-LP =

Binghamton, New York; United States
- Broadcast area: Broome County, New York
- Frequency: 99.5 MHz
- Branding: 99.5 WBDY-LP

Programming
- Format: Variety
- Affiliations: Pacifica Network

Ownership
- Owner: The Bundy Museum of History and Art

History
- First air date: November 25, 2017
- Call sign meaning: Bundy

Technical information
- Licensing authority: FCC
- Facility ID: 194370
- Class: L1
- Power: 10 watts
- HAAT: 70 meters (230 ft)
- Transmitter coordinates: 42°07′11.9″N 75°55′9.4″W

Links
- Public license information: LMS
- Webcast: Listen live
- Website: bundymuseum.org/wbdy

WBDY-LP is a variety formatted broadcast radio station licensed to Binghamton, New York, United States, and serving Broome County, New York. WBDY-LP is owned and operated by The Bundy Museum of History and Art.
