= XHSAG-FM =

Radio station in Salamanca, Guanajuato, Mexico

- Salamanca, Guanajuato; Mexico
- Broadcast area: Irapuato, Guanajuato
- Frequency: 92.5 MHz (HD Radio)
- Branding: La Perrona

Programming
- Format: Regional Mexican

Ownership
- Owner: Radiorama; (XESAG-AM, S.A. de C.V.)
- Operator: Grupo El Salmantino

History
- First air date: November 30, 1994
- Former call signs: XESAG-AM
- Former frequencies: 1040 kHz (1994–2021)
- Call sign meaning: Salamanca, Guanajuato

Technical information
- Class: A (Note: The allotment is short-spaced to XHGX-FM in San Luis de la Paz, thus the ERP restriction to 1 kW.)
- ERP: 1 kW

Links
- Webcast: Listen live
- Website: salmantino.mx/radio/

XHSAG-FM 92.5 FM is a radio station in Salamanca, Guanajuato, with studios in Irapuato, Guanajuato. Owned by Radiorama but operated by Grupo El Salmantino, XHSAG carries a Regional Mexican format known as La Perrona.

== History ==
The original XESAG concession was awarded to Radio Creatividad, S.A., a Radiorama subsidiary, on November 30, 1994.

XESAG was approved to migrate to FM in April 2018. The 92.5 frequency had first been offered to XEZH-AM 1260, which opted not to move. The FM was officially launched in November 2021.
