= XHEZZZ-FM =

Radio station in Tapachula, Chiapas

- Tapachula, Chiapas, Mexico; Mexico
- Frequency: 99.5 FM
- Branding: Los 40

Programming
- Format: Pop
- Affiliations: Televisa Radio

Ownership
- Owner: Radio Núcleo; (Operadora de Radio Z.Z.Z., S.A. de C.V.)

History
- First air date: February 26, 1996 (concession); 2011 (FM)

Technical information
- ERP: 25 kW
- HAAT: 112.4 m
- Transmitter coordinates: 14°55′01.64″N 92°16′33″W

Links
- Website: los40tapachula.com

XHEZZZ-FM is a radio station on 99.5 FM in Tapachula, Chiapas. XHEZZZ carries the Los 40 format from Televisa Radio.

== History ==
XHEZZZ began as a proposal for XEZY-AM 1380, located in Ciudad Hidalgo, Chiapas, a station and frequency made available in 1970. However, the station was built in Tapachula on 590 kHz with the XEZZZ-AM calls in 1996 by Miguel Galindo Amador.

The concession was sold in 2007.
