= XHSBT-FM =

Radio station in San Buenaventura, Chihuahua, Mexico

- San Buenaventura, Chihuahua; Mexico
- Frequency: 99.5 MHz
- Branding: La Que Buena de San Buena

Programming
- Format: Regional Mexican

Ownership
- Owner: Grupo JB Multimedia; (Eber Joel Beltran Zamarrón)

History
- First air date: October 28, 1994 (concession)
- Call sign meaning: San Buenaventura

Technical information
- Licensing authority: CRT
- Class: B
- ERP: 2.98 kW
- HAAT: 459.1 m (1,506 ft)

Links
- Webcast: Listen live
- Website: gbmradio.com

XHSBT-FM is a radio station on 99.5 FM in San Buenaventura, Chihuahua, Mexico. It is owned by Grupo JB Multimedia and known as La Que Buena de San Buena with a Regional Mexican format.

== History ==
XHSBT received its concession on October 28, 1994. It was initially owned by Ernesto Agustín Salayandia García. It later was owned by Israel Beltrán Montes.

The station briefly broadcast a Christian format known as La Voz from 2021 to 2022.
