= XHRTM-FM =

Radio station in Macuspana, Tabasco

- Macuspana, Tabasco; Mexico
- Frequency: 99.5 FM
- Branding: La Z

Programming
- Format: Regional Mexican

Ownership
- Owner: Grupo Cantón (Conexión en Radio); (Radio y Televisión de Calidad, S.A. de C.V.)

History
- First air date: October 6, 1960 (concession)
- Former call signs: XEPT-AM, XERTM-AM

Technical information
- Class: B
- ERP: 6 kW
- HAAT: 339.94 m
- Transmitter coordinates: 17°45′23″N 92°35′38″W

XHRTM-FM is a radio station on 99.5 FM in Macuspana, Tabasco. It is owned by Grupo Cantón and carries a Regional Mexican format known as La Z.

== History ==
XEPT-AM 620 received its concession on October 6, 1960, originally to be located in Ciudad del Carmen, Campeche. The call sign was later changed to XERTM-AM. By 1970, it was owned by Fausto Aguilar Saldivar and broadcast from Macuspana, Tabasco with 1,000 watts on 1150 kHz. The current concessionaire acquired it in 2003 and moved it to 850 kHz with 5,000 watts during the day and 1,000 at night.

XERTM was approved to migrate to FM on June 4, 2010, becoming XHRTM-FM 107.7. XHRTM-FM was moved to 99.5 MHz in 2018 in order to clear 106-108 MHz for community and indigenous stations, as a condition of its concession renewal.
