= XHZM-FM =

Radio station in Puebla, Puebla

- Puebla, Puebla; Mexico
- Frequency: 92.5 MHz (HD Radio)
- Branding: Ultra 92.5

Programming
- Format: Pop
- Subchannels: HD2: UP

Ownership
- Owner: Grupo Ultra; (Ultradigital Puebla, S.A. de C.V.)

History
- First air date: August 9, 1972 (concession)
- Call sign meaning: Arturo Zorrilla Martínez, original concessionaire

Technical information
- Class: C1
- ERP: 75 kW

Links
- Webcast: Listen live Listen live (HD2)
- Website: puebla.ultralaradio.mx

XHZM-FM is a Mexican radio station on 92.5 FM in Puebla, Puebla, in Mexico. The station is owned by Grupo Ultra and known as Ultra 92.5.

XHZM-FM broadcasts in HD and carries two subchannels, known as Ultra 92.5.1 and UP 92.5.2.
