= XHAF-FM =

Radio station in Celaya, Guanajuato, Mexico

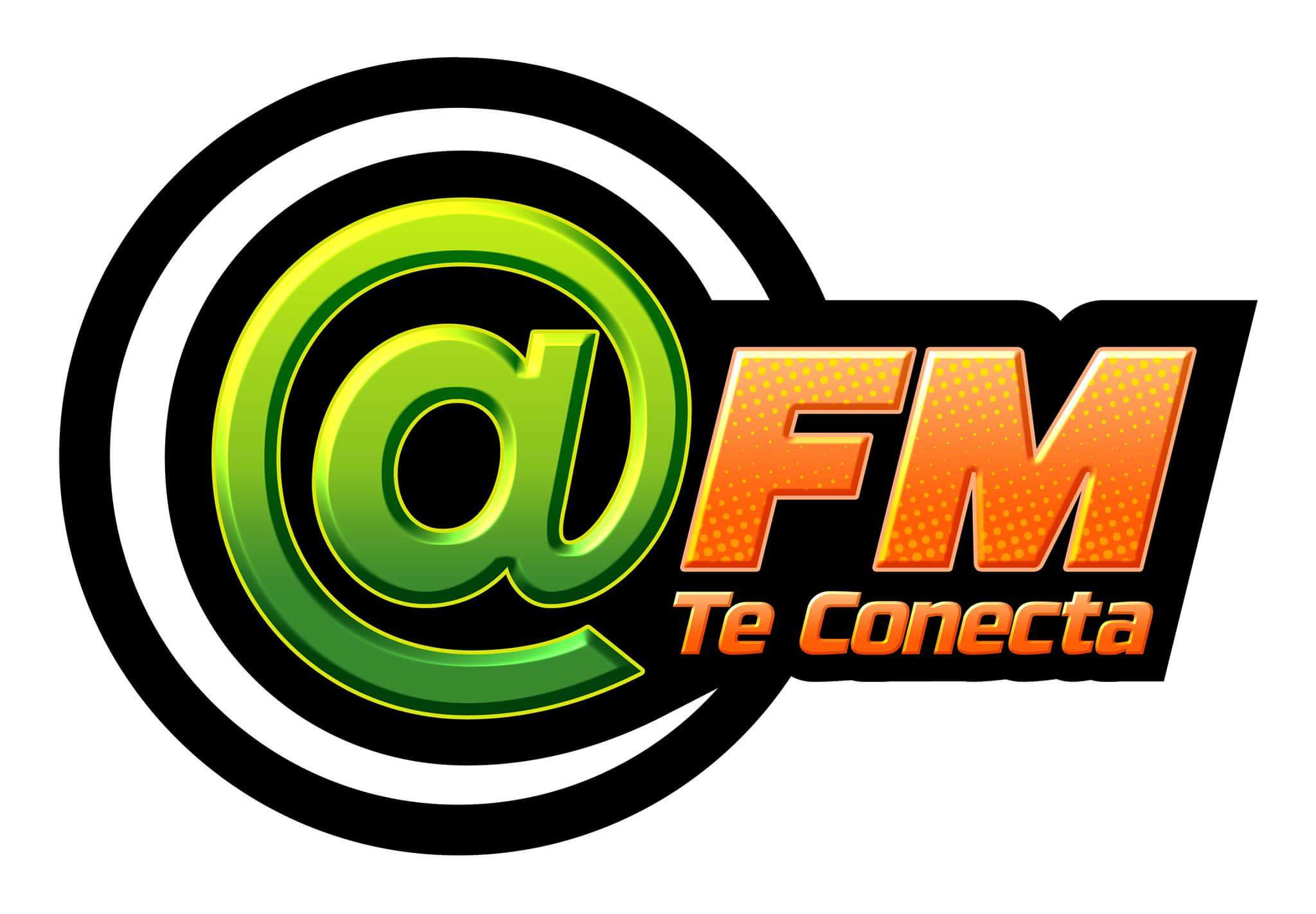
- Celaya, Guanajuato; Mexico
- Frequency: 99.5 FM
- Branding: @FM (Arroba FM)

Programming
- Format: English and Spanish contemporary hit radio

Ownership
- Owner: Grupo Radiorama; (Radio Comunicación Trébol de Celaya, S.A. de C.V.)
- Sister stations: XHGTO-FM

History
- First air date: June 28, 1979 (concession)
- Former call signs: XEAF-AM
- Former frequencies: 1580 AM

Technical information
- ERP: 6 kW
- HAAT: -5.65 meters
- Transmitter coordinates: 20°31′10.5″N 100°49′29.96″W

Links
- Webcast: Listen live
- Website: arroba.fm

XHAF-FM is a radio station on 99.5 FM in Celaya, Guanajuato, Mexico. XHAF carries the @FM contemporary hit radio format from Grupo Radiorama.

== History ==
XHAF logo used while Éxtasis Digital

XHAF began as XEAF-AM, receiving its concession on June 28, 1979. It was owned by Enrique Bermúdez Olvera and broadcast as a daytimer on 1580 kHz. It was sold in the 1990s and migrated to FM in 2012.

In 2015, XHAF moved to a new transmitter facility. The previous one was in Ojo Seco.

In 2017, XHAF changed from Éxtasis Digital to @FM.
