= WZAC-FM =

- WZAC-FM station banner.
- Danville / Madison, West Virginia; United States
- Broadcast area: Madison, West Virginia; Logan, West Virginia; Charleston, West Virginia
- Frequency: 92.5 MHz
- Branding: Coal River Country 92.5

Programming
- Format: Classic Country
- Affiliations: AP Radio News; Fast Break Sports; WV Metro News

Ownership
- Owner: Naomi Kaye Watson; (Price Broadcasting, LLC)

History
- First air date: October 9, 1989
- Former call signs: WZAC (1989–1989)
- Call sign meaning: ZAC(in honor of the Zaca Price.)(the father of the founder of WZAC Wayne Price)

Technical information
- Licensing authority: FCC
- Facility ID: 53501
- Class: A
- ERP: 610 watts
- HAAT: 212 meters (696 ft)
- Transmitter coordinates: 38°5′1.30″N 81°48′16.40″W

Links
- Public license information: Public file; LMS
- Website: wzac925.com

WZAC-FM (92.5 FM) is a Classic Country formatted broadcast radio station.known as "Coal River Country 92.5". The station is licensed to Danville, West Virginia, and serves Madison, Logan, and Charleston in West Virginia. WZAC-FM is owned and operated by Naomi Kaye Watson, through licensee Price Broadcasting, LLC.
