= XHTGM-FM =

Community radio station in Tangancícuaro, Michoacán

Tangancícuaro, Michoacán; Mexico
- Frequency: 99.5 MHz
- Branding: Radio Manantial

Programming
- Format: Community radio

Ownership
- Owner: Grupo Cultural Tangancícuaro, A.C.

History
- First air date: April 1, 2018
- Call sign meaning: "Tangancícuaro, Michoacán"

Technical information
- Class: A
- ERP: 2.31 kW
- HAAT: -135.7 meters
- Transmitter coordinates: 19°53′44.24″N 102°12′16.48″W

Links
- Webcast: Radio Manantial

XHTGM-FM is a community radio station on 99.5 FM in Tangancícuaro, Michoacán. It is known as Radio Manantial.

== History ==
XHTGM's concession was approved on December 13, 2017. The station signed on April 1, 2018. XHTGM had previously operated as a pirate on 105.1 MHz.
