= Danville, West Virginia =

- Town
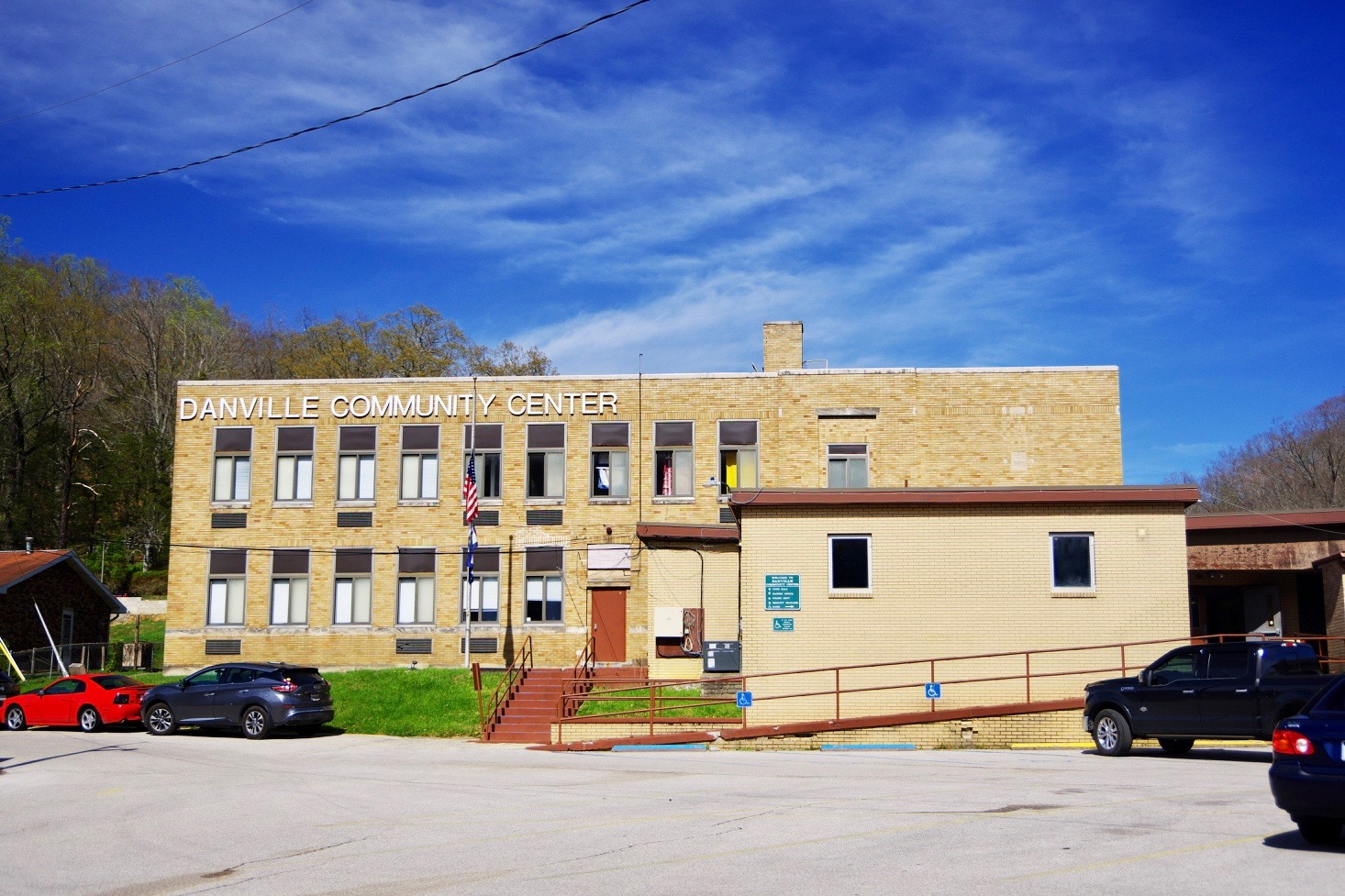
- Danville Community Center

- Flag

- Location of Danville in Boone County, West Virginia.
- Coordinates: 38°4′40″N 81°50′9″W
- Country: United States
- State: West Virginia
- County: Boone

Area
  - Total: 1.08 sq mi (2.81 km^{2})
  - Land: 1.07 sq mi (2.77 km^{2})
  - Water: 0.015 sq mi (0.04 km^{2})
- Elevation: 699 ft (213 m)

Population (2020)
  - Total: 672
  - Estimate (2021): 645
  - Density: 562.6/sq mi (217.24/km^{2})
- Time zone: UTC-5 (Eastern (EST))
  - Summer (DST): UTC-4 (EDT)
- ZIP code: 25053
- Area code: 304
- FIPS code: 54-20212
- GNIS feature ID: 1537999
- Website: danvillewv.org

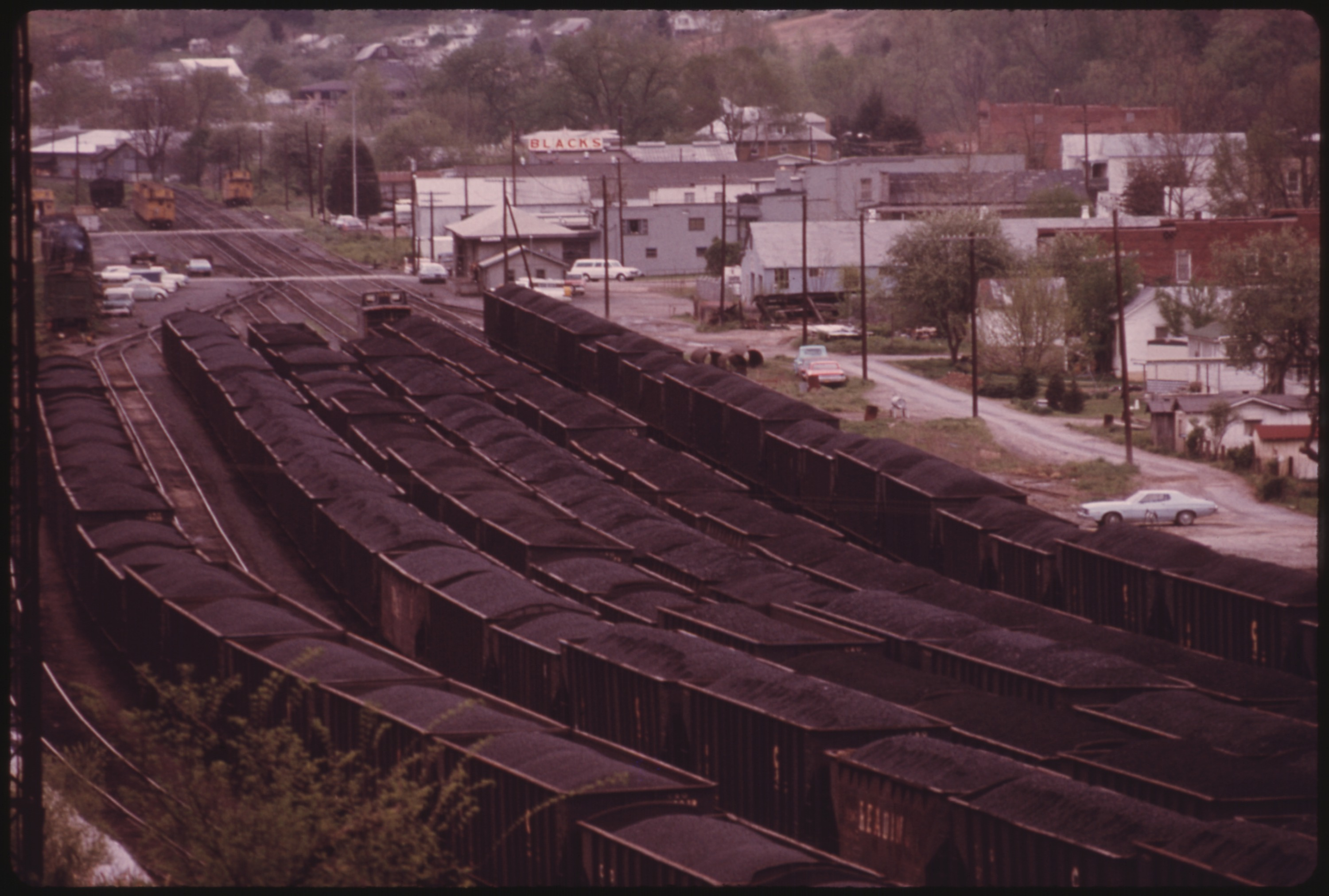
This photo from 1974 is captioned: "Coal yard with loaded rail cars ready to be shipped to customers out of Danville, West Virginia, near Charleston. It is one of the largest transshipment points for coal in the world. A constant stream of rail cars loaded with coal is moved in and out of the small town."

Danville is a town in Boone County, West Virginia, United States. The population was 672 at the 2020 census. Danville was incorporated in 1911 and named for Dan Rock, the town's first postmaster. Danville was formerly known as Newport and Red House.

== Geography ==
Danville is located in northwestern Boone County at 38°4′40″N 81°50′9″W (38.077863, -81.835696), The town is situated along the Little Coal River, with its business district lying primarily along the east bank of the river. Madison, the county seat, borders Danville to the south.

West Virginia Route 85, signed as Smoot Avenue within Danville, traverses the town, connecting it with Madison to the south, and terminating at U.S. Route 119 on the north side of town. From this intersection, US 119 continues northeastward in the direction of Charleston, and southwestward to Chapmanville and Logan.

According to the United States Census Bureau, the town has a total area of 1.08 square miles (2.80 km^{2}), of which 1.07 square miles (2.77 km^{2}) is land and 0.01 square miles (0.03 km^{2}) is water.

== Demographics ==
Historical population
| Census | Pop. | Note | %± |
|---|---|---|---|
| 1920 | 327 | | — |
| 1930 | 486 | | 48.6% |
| 1940 | 417 | | −14.2% |
| 1950 | 544 | | 30.5% |
| 1960 | 507 | | −6.8% |
| 1970 | 580 | | 14.4% |
| 1980 | 727 | | 25.3% |
| 1990 | 595 | | −18.2% |
| 2000 | 550 | | −7.6% |
| 2010 | 691 | | 25.6% |
| 2020 | 672 | | −2.7% |
| 2021 (est.) | 645 | ▼ | −4.0% |
U.S. Decennial Census

=== 2010 census ===
As of the census of 2010, there were 691 people, 303 households, and 150 families living in the town. The population density was 645.8 inhabitants per square mile (249.3/km^{2}). There were 334 housing units at an average density of 312.1 per square mile (120.5/km^{2}). The racial makeup of the town was 98.1% White, 0.6% African American, 0.3% Asian, 0.6% from other races, and 0.4% from two or more races. Hispanic or Latino of any race were 1.3% of the population.

There were 303 households, of which 20.8% had children under the age of 18 living with them, 33.3% were married couples living together, 11.2% had a female householder with no husband present, 5.0% had a male householder with no wife present, and 50.5% were non-families. 44.9% of all households were made up of individuals, and 25.1% had someone living alone who was 65 years of age or older. The average household size was 1.98 and the average family size was 2.72.

The median age in the town was 53.6 years. 14.8% of residents were under the age of 18; 6.6% were between the ages of 18 and 24; 18.9% were from 25 to 44; 28.4% were from 45 to 64; and 31.4% were 65 years of age or older. The gender makeup of the town was 44.1% male and 55.9% female.

=== 2000 census ===
As of the census of 2000, there were 550 people, 285 households, and 139 families living in the town. The population density was 507.3 per square mile (195.9/km^{2}). There were 325 housing units at an average density of 299.7 per square mile (115.7/km^{2}). The racial makeup of the town was 99.27% White, 0.36% African American, 0.18% Native American, and 0.18% from two or more races.

There were 285 households, out of which 20.0% had children under the age of 18 living with them, 35.4% were married couples living together, 10.2% had a female householder with no husband present, and 51.2% were non-families. Of all households, 48.1% were made up of individuals, and 24.6% had someone living alone who was 65 years of age or older. The average household size was 1.93 and the average family size was 2.73.

In the town, the population was spread out, with 18.0% under the age of 18, 8.5% from 18 to 24, 27.8% from 25 to 44, 23.8% from 45 to 64, and 21.8% who were 65 years of age or older. The median age was 43 years. For every 100 females, there were 77.4 males. For every 100 females age 18 and over, there were 73.5 males.

The median income for a household in the town was $21,369, and the median income for a family was $26,397. Males had a median income of $33,125 versus $23,333 for females. The per capita income for the town was $14,469. About 13.1% of families and 16.3% of the population were below the poverty line, including 18.3% of those under age 18 and 5.1% of those age 65 or over.

The population of ZIP Code Tabulation Area (ZCTA) 25053, which includes Danville, was 3,376 in 2000. According to the 2020–2024 American Community Survey 5-year estimates, ZCTA 25053 had a population of 3,801.

== Public services ==
Danville is serviced by the Danville Volunteer Fire Department. The department is a fully volunteer organization with an annual budget of $150,000 per year. It provides fire protection and rescue services to the Town of Danville and surrounding areas covering 30 miles (48 km) of Route 119 (Corridor "G").

== In popular culture ==
Folk musician Dock Boggs composed "Danville Girl":

Well I got off at Danville
Got stuck on the Danville girl
You bet your life she's out of sight
She wore those Danville curls.
