= WOKN =

- Southport, New York; United States
- Broadcast area: Elmira-Corning area
- Frequency: 99.5 MHz
- Branding: 99.5 WOKN

Programming
- Format: Country
- Affiliations: Westwood One

Ownership
- Owner: Gordon Ishikawa; (Tower Broadcasting LLC)

History
- First air date: September 15, 1993

Technical information
- Licensing authority: FCC
- Facility ID: 47322
- Class: A
- ERP: 1,700 watts
- HAAT: 191 meters (627 ft)
- Transmitter coordinates: 42°01′55″N 76°47′01″W
- Translator: 102.5 W273AC (Corning)

Links
- Public license information: Public file; LMS
- Webcast: Listen live
- Website: 995woknelmira.com

WOKN (99.5 FM) is a radio station broadcasting a country music format. Licensed to Southport, New York, United States, the station serves the Elmira-Corning area. The station is currently owned by Tower Broadcasting LLC and features programming from Westwood One.

== FM Translator ==
WOKN also simulcasts from an FM translator in Corning, New York.

Broadcast translator for WOKN
Call sign	Frequency	City of license	FID	ERP (W)	Class	FCC info
W273AC	102.5 FM	Corning, New York	47323	14	D	LMS
