= WAOL =

Coordinates: 38°38′55″N 84°00′42″W

Ripley, Ohio; United States
- Broadcast area: Cincinnati metropolitan area
- Frequency: 99.5 MHz
- Branding: The Edge 99.5

Programming
- Format: Hot Adult Contemporary

Ownership
- Owner: Donald Bowles and Venita Frame Bowles; (Dreamcatcher Communications, Inc.)

History
- First air date: 1993
- Former call signs: WXKD (1990–1992, CP)

Technical information
- Facility ID: 56226
- Class: C3
- ERP: 13,000 watts
- HAAT: 140 meters (460 ft)

Links
- Website: 995TheEdge.fm

WAOL (99.5 MHz) is a commercial FM radio station licensed to Ripley, Ohio, and serving the southeastern suburbs of the Cincinnati metropolitan area. It carries a hot adult contemporary radio format and is owned by Donald Bowles and Venita Frame Bowles, through licensee Dreamcatcher Communications, Inc. It calls itself "99-5 The Edge."

WAOL has an effective radiated power of 13,000 watts. The transmitter is off Vermillion Pike in Stonewall, Kentucky.

== History ==
In 1993, the station signed on the air. It formerly aired an Adult Hits music format as "Max FM," then relaunched as "The Edge" in October 2013 after a period of identifying as simply "The New 99.5 WAOL."
