= WBLH =

- Black River, New York; United States
- Broadcast area: Watertown, New York
- Frequency: 92.5 MHz
- Branding: Tunes 92.5 & 104.5 FM

Programming
- Format: Variety hits

Ownership
- Owner: Radioactive, LLC
- Operator: Intrepid Broadcasting, Inc.

History
- First air date: August 2008; 17 years ago

Technical information
- Licensing authority: FCC
- Facility ID: 164250
- Class: A
- ERP: 6,000 watts
- HAAT: 100 meters (330 ft)
- Transmitter coordinates: 44.055°N 75.954°W
- Translator: 104.5 W283CC (Watertown)

Links
- Public license information: Public file; LMS
- Webcast: Listen live
- Website: tunes925.com

WBLH (92.5 MHz, called "TUNES") is a commercial FM radio station licensed to Black River, New York, and serving the Watertown area. It broadcasts a variety hits radio format. WBLH also has a 65 watt FM translator in Watertown, W283CC, broadcasting at 104.5 MHz.

WBLH's license is currently held by Radioactive, LLC (controlled by Randy Michaels). However, under a local marketing agreement (LMA), WBLH is operated by Intrepid Broadcasting, with Intrepid ultimately planning to buy the station outright.

== History ==
The station first went on the air in July 2008 and had a format much more diverse than what is played now. Anything from 1930s music onward to television theme songs were heard. In August 2008 the station assumed its current format. The station now features many genres of music and often uses the catch phrase, "Tunes 92.5; We Play It All!"

Personalities include Ryan Grant, Holly King, Johnny Keegan, and Mykel ‘Quince’ Myrick.
