= WTHM-LP =

- Ravenswood, West Virginia; United States
- Broadcast area: Ravenswood, West Virginia; Ripley, West Virginia
- Frequency: 92.5 MHz
- Branding: Worship To His Majesty

Programming
- Format: Christian News/Talk

Ownership
- Owner: Mountain State Community Radio, Inc.

History
- First air date: July 6, 2015
- Former call signs: Call signs prior to going on air: WTHM-LP (2014); WVFC-LP (2014); WRWO-LP (2014); WTHM-LP (2014); WTYH-LP (2014); WTHM-LP (2014); WRWO-LP (2014); WORR-LP (2014); WCGH-LP (2014); WUCH-LP (2014); WTGH-LP (2015)
- Call sign meaning: Worship To His Majesty

Technical information
- Licensing authority: FCC
- Facility ID: 191765
- Class: L1
- ERP: 22 watts
- HAAT: 63.2 meters (207 ft)
- Transmitter coordinates: 38°53′35.0″N 81°46′51.0″W

Links
- Public license information: LMS
- Website: wthmfm.com

WTHM-LP is a Christian News/Talk formatted broadcast radio station licensed to Ravenswood, West Virginia, serving the Ravenswood/Ripley area. WTHM-LP is owned and operated by Mountain State Community Radio, Inc.
