= WJCX =

- Pittsfield, Maine; United States
- Broadcast area: Somerset County and Penobscot County, Maine
- Frequency: 99.5 MHz

Programming
- Format: Contemporary Christian
- Affiliations: Calvary Chapel

Ownership
- Owner: Calvary Chapel of Bangor

History
- First air date: November 13, 1989 (as WFOV)
- Former call signs: WFOV (1989–1993); WPBC (1993–1996)

Technical information
- Licensing authority: FCC
- Facility ID: 421
- Class: A
- ERP: 6,000 watts
- HAAT: 100.0 meters
- Transmitter coordinates: 44°48′11″N 69°10′6″W

Links
- Public license information: Public file; LMS

WJCX (99.5 FM) is a radio station broadcasting a contemporary Christian format. Licensed to Pittsfield, Maine, United States, the station serves the Bangor area. The station is owned by Calvary Chapel of Bangor.

== History ==
The station went on the air as WFOV on November 13, 1989. On July 9, 1993, the station changed its call sign to WPBC; on December 20, 1996, the station changed to the current WJCX.
