= KBZQ =

- Lawton, Oklahoma; United States
- Frequency: 99.5 MHz
- Branding: The Breeze 99.5

Programming
- Format: Adult contemporary
- Affiliations: ABC News

Ownership
- Owner: Chad Fox; (Local Radio, L.L.C.)

History
- First air date: 1982 (as KMGZ)
- Former call signs: KMGZ (1982–1992); KMVE (1992)

Technical information
- Licensing authority: FCC
- Facility ID: 72712
- Class: C3
- ERP: 25,000 watts
- HAAT: 100 meters (330 ft)
- Transmitter coordinates: 34°35′31″N 98°32′55″W

Links
- Public license information: Public file; LMS
- Website: [www.lawtonradio.com]

KBZQ (99.5 FM, "The Breeze 99.5") is a radio station broadcasting an adult contemporary music format. Licensed to Lawton, Oklahoma, United States, the station serves the greater Lawton area. The station is currently owned by Chad Fox, through licensee Local Radio, L.L.C. Studio is located at 501 C. Ave Suite 308B downtown Lawton, and the transmitter is located southwest of the city.

== History ==
The station was granted a construction permit on September 7, 1982, and was assigned the call letters KMGZ on October 28, 1982. It received its license to cover on February 10, 1984. On June 5, 1992, the station changed its call sign to KMVE, and on June 10, 1992, to the current KBZQ.
