= KZZL-FM =

- Pullman, Washington; United States
- Frequency: 99.5 MHz
- Branding: Bull Country

Programming
- Format: Country
- Affiliations: Premiere Radio Networks, Westwood One

Ownership
- Owner: Inland Northwest Broadcasting, LLC

History
- First air date: 1992
- Former call signs: KPNP (1987–1989, CP)

Technical information
- Licensing authority: FCC
- Facility ID: 26412
- Class: C1
- ERP: 77,000 watts
- HAAT: 323 meters (1,060 ft)
- Transmitter coordinates: 46°40′52.00″N 116°58′16.00″W

Links
- Public license information: Public file; LMS
- Website: inlandnwbroadcasting.com/radio-products/kzzl/

KZZL-FM (99.5 FM) is a radio station broadcasting a country music format. Licensed to Pullman, Washington, United States, the station is currently owned by Inland Northwest Broadcasting, LLC and features programming from Premiere Radio Networks and Dial Global.

== History ==
The station was assigned the call letters KPNP on March 3, 1987. On April 14, 1989, the station changed its call sign to the current KZZL.
