= KQMA =

Coordinates: 39.617°N 99.299°W

- Phillipsburg, Kansas; United States
- Frequency: 92.5 MHz

Programming
- Format: Variety/Full-Service

History
- First air date: July 14, 1984

Technical information
- Licensing authority: FCC
- Class: C1
- ERP: 100,000 watts
- HAAT: 156 meters

Links
- Public license information: Public file; LMS
- Webcast: Listen Live
- Website: kkankqma.com

KQMA is an FM radio station broadcasting on 92.5 FM from Phillipsburg, Kansas. The station began service on July 14, 1984, and was founded by Brian O'Neill. The station is currently owned and operated by RTY Broadcasting, broadcasting a Variety/Full-Service format. Playing a mix of Classic Rock, Oldies, Contemporary and Today's Hot New Country, as well as an assortment of other local programming.
