= WKXQ (FM) =

Coordinates: 40°8′20.0″N 90°39′26.0″W

- Rushville, Illinois; United States
- Broadcast area: Beardstown, Illinois; Rushville, Illinois; Mount Sterling, Illinois
- Frequency: 92.5 MHz
- Branding: WKXQ 92.5 FM

Programming
- Format: Adult standards
- Affiliations: America's Best Music

Ownership
- Owner: LB Sports Productions LLC

History
- First air date: May 1, 1985

Technical information
- Licensing authority: FCC
- Facility ID: 25753
- Class: A
- ERP: 6,000 watts
- HAAT: 100 meters (330 ft)

Links
- Public license information: Public file; LMS
- Webcast: Listen Live
- Website: wkxqfm.com

WKXQ (92.5 FM) is a radio station licensed to Rushville, Illinois, United States. The station airs an adult standards format, and is owned by LB Sports Productions LLC.
