= KFGD-LP =

- Fresno, California; United States
- Frequency: 92.5 MHz

Programming
- Format: Travel information

Ownership
- Owner: Fig Garden Police Protection District

History
- First air date: December 14, 2015

Technical information
- Licensing authority: FCC
- Facility ID: 193033
- Class: L1
- ERP: 100 watts
- HAAT: 29.2 meters (96 ft)
- Transmitter coordinates: 36°47′14.70″N 119°42′46.20″W

Links
- Public license information: LMS
- Website: oldfig.org/police_fire/police.html

KFGD-LP is a low power radio station broadcasting out of Fresno, California.

== History ==
KFGD-LP began broadcasting on December 14, 2015.
