= XHERW-FM =

Radio station in León, Guanajuato

León, Guanajuato; Mexico
- Frequency: 101.1 MHz
- Branding: Radio Fórmula

Programming
- Format: News/talk

Ownership
- Owner: Radio Fórmula; (Transmisora Regional Radio Fórmula, S.A. de C.V.)
- Sister stations: XHACN-FM

History
- First air date: October 28, 1942 (concession)

Technical information
- Class: B1
- ERP: 10 kW
- HAAT: −107.61 meters (−353.1 ft)
- Transmitter coordinates: 21°08′13.2″N 101°37′23.4″W

Links
- Website: radioformulabajio.com

XHERW-FM is a radio station on 101.1 FM in León, Guanajuato. It is owned by Radio Fórmula and carries its news and talk format in conjunction with XHACN-FM 107.1.

== History ==
XERW-AM 1290 received its concession on October 28, 1942. By the 1960s, it was owned by Radiotransmisora El Heraldo de Guanajuato, S.A. and broadcasting on 1390 kHz. Names for the station over the years included La Divertida, Poder Láser and Stereo 1390. In the 1990s, Ondas de la Alegría (Radio Comerciales del Centro), the León division of the Guadalajara-based broadcaster Notisistema, exited the market and sold to Radio Fórmula, with the concession transferring in 2001.

XERW migrated to FM in 2011 and began broadcasting with 3 kW. In 2015, XHERW was approved for a power increase to 10 kW from the same site.
