= KNKJ-LP =

- Red Bluff, California; United States
- Broadcast area: Red Bluff, California
- Frequency: 92.5 MHz

Ownership
- Owner: Calvary Chapel Red Bluff

History
- First air date: March 13, 2014
- Last air date: 2026

Technical information
- Licensing authority: FCC
- Facility ID: 195612
- Class: L1
- ERP: 100 watts
- HAAT: −6.7 meters (−22 ft)
- Transmitter coordinates: 40°09′12″N 122°15′30″W

Links
- Public license information: LMS

KNKJ-LP (92.5 FM) was a low power FM radio station licensed to Calvary Chapel Red Bluff. It broadcast out of Red Bluff, California, United States.

== History ==
KNKJ-LP began broadcasting on March 13, 2014.
