= XHOI-FM =

Radio station in León, Guanajuato

- León, Guanajuato, Mexico; Mexico
- Broadcast area: León, Guanajuato
- Frequency: 92.3 FM
- Branding: BluFM

Programming
- Format: English classic hits

Ownership
- Owner: Promomedios; (Organización Independiente de Fomento Musical, S.A.)
- Sister stations: XHELG-FM, XHLG-FM, XHLEO-FM

History
- First air date: March 7, 1970 (concession)

Technical information
- Class: B
- ERP: 10 kW

Links
- Webcast: Listen live
- Website: blufm.mx

XHOI-FM is a radio station on 92.3 FM in León, Guanajuato. The station is owned by Promomedios and is known as BluFM with a English classic hits format.

== History ==
Logo as BluFM, used until 2026

XHOI received its first concession on March 7, 1970. It was owned by ARTSA until 1981, when it was transferred to the current concessionaire. It was originally known as "Formula Melodica" then "Stereo OI".
