= ABC Central Coast =

Coordinates: 33.4367°S 151.3928°E

ABC Central Coast (2BL/T)
Gosford, New South Wales; Australia
- Broadcast area: Central Coast, New South Wales
- Frequency: 92.5 MHz FM
- Branding: ABC Central Coast

Programming
- Language: English
- Format: Talk

Ownership
- Owner: Australian Broadcasting Corporation

History
- First air date: 27 November 2003
- Call sign meaning: Translator of ABC Radio Sydney (2BL)

Links
- Website: abc.net.au/centralcoast/

ABC Central Coast is an ABC Local Radio station based in Gosford and broadcasting to the Central Coast region in New South Wales. The transmission area of the station stretches from Woy Woy to The Entrance. The signal is notoriously weak in many valley areas of the region.

The station official callsign is 2BL/T reflecting its function as an opt-out service of ABC Radio Sydney. The station commenced broadcasting in 2003 on the frequency of 92.5 FM.

== History ==
The station was the newest radio station when it opened on 27 November 2003 in Gosford. The first studios were located in one of Australia's largest malls, Erina Fair, and were dubbed the Fishbowl, due to the station being an experiment in the new style of accessible, local, listener driven radio. In 2014, the station relocated studios to the base of The Kensmen Building on 131–133 Donnison Street in the CBD.

== See also ==
- List of radio stations in Australia
