= KNTI =

Coordinates: 39.1311°N 123.0764°W

- Lakeport, California; United States
- Broadcast area: Lake County, California
- Frequency: 99.5 MHz
- Branding: The Tee

Programming
- Format: AAA

Ownership
- Owner: Bicoastal Media Licenses, LLC

History
- First air date: November 19, 1984

Technical information
- Licensing authority: FCC
- Facility ID: 20025
- Class: B
- ERP: 2,400 watts
- HAAT: 585 meters

Links
- Public license information: Public file; LMS
- Webcast: Listen Live
- Website: knti.com

The KNTI call letters were granted by the Federal Communications Commission on November 19, 1984. KNTI is a class B FM signal station and operates on an FM frequency of 99.5 MHz.

KNTI's transmitter is located atop Cow Mountain in Lake County, California

This is one of Lake County and Mendocino County(s) primary radio communications point for radio stations, wireless phone services, emergency services and the Federal Aviation Administration.

Bicoastal Media LLC
