= XHZN-FM (Guanajuato) =

Radio station in Celaya, Guanajuato, Mexico

XHZN-FM/XEZN-AM
- Celaya, Guanajuato; Mexico
- Frequencies: 104.5 MHz; 780 kHz
- Branding: LG La Grande

Programming
- Format: Spanish oldies

Ownership
- Owner: TVR Comunicaciones (pending sale to Promomedios); (FM Celaya, S.A. de C.V.)
- Operator: Promomedios
- Sister stations: XHEFG-FM, XHEOF-FM

History
- First air date: March 7, 1974 (concession)
- Former frequencies: 99.3 MHz

Technical information
- Class: B1 (FM)
- Power: 5 kW day
- ERP: 10,000 watts
- Transmitter coordinates: 20°31′10.41″N 100°48′5.29″W (FM)

Links
- Webcast: Listen live
- Website: lgfm.mx

XHZN-FM 104.5/XEZN-AM 780 is a radio station in Celaya, Guanajuato, Mexico. It is owned by Promomedios and carries a Spanish oldies format known as LG La Grande.

== History ==
Impulsora de Radiodifusión, S.A., received a concession for XEZN-AM on 780 kHz in 1974. The FM station was added in 1994, originally broadcasting on 99.3 but later moved.

The concessionaire was Radio XHOZ-FM since 1996 until 2016, when it changed its name to FM Celaya. Impulsora de Radiodifusión owned XHOZ-FM in Querétaro until 2006.

In June 2026, Exa FM moved to XHEOF-FM and XHZN adopted the brand used by XHELG-FM of León.
