= KJID-LP =

Radio station in Tyler, Texas, United States

- Tyler, Texas; United States
- Broadcast area: Tyler, Texas
- Frequency: 92.5 MHz
- Branding: Radio Manantiales de Vida

Programming
- Language: Spanish
- Format: Religious

Ownership
- Owner: Iglesia de Dios Jesucristo Manantiales de Vida

History
- First air date: August 1, 2016

Technical information
- Licensing authority: FCC
- Facility ID: 192257
- Class: D
- ERP: 61 watts
- HAAT: 38.5 meters (126 ft)
- Transmitter coordinates: 32°21′28.00″N 95°18′20.00″W

Links
- Public license information: LMS

KJID-LP (92.5 FM) is a terrestrial American low power radio station, licensed to Tyler, Smith County, Texas, United States, and is owned by the Iglesia de Dios Jesucristo Manantiales de Vida.

KJID-LP's studio is located at 520 Bow St., in downtown Tyler.

== History ==
Iglesia de Dios Jesuchristo Manantiales de Vida received a construction permit to build a low power Class L1 FM radio station, licensed to Tyler, on February 5, 2015. The facility was modified twice, through subsequent amendments to the license, and received a License to Cover from the Federal Communications Commission on August 1, 2016.

It airs a Spanish language religious format. Due to the low power of the Class L1 facility, KJID-LP's signal is limited to the city center population within Loop 323, as well as northern areas outside the Loop, still in close proximity to the city center.
