= XHACN-FM =

Radio station in León, Guanajuato

- León, Guanajuato; Mexico
- Broadcast area: Bajio
- Frequency: 107.1 MHz
- Branding: Trión

Programming
- Format: Rock

Ownership
- Owner: Radio Fórmula; (Transmisora Regional Radio Fórmula, S.A. de C.V.)
- Sister stations: XHERW-FM

History
- First air date: October 18, 1971 (concession)

Technical information
- Class: B1
- ERP: 30 kW
- HAAT: 109.3 meters (359 ft)
- Transmitter coordinates: 21°08′13.2″N 101°37′23.4″W

Links
- Website: trion.fm radioformulabajio.com

XHACN-FM is a radio station on 107.1 FM in León, Guanajuato. It is owned by Radio Fórmula and carries its Trión rock format.

== History ==
XEACN-AM 910 received its concession on October 18, 1971. It was owned by Rafael Cutberto Navarro and broadcast with 500 watts from San Francisco del Rincón. In 1988, it was sold to Amplitud Modulada de León, with a further sale in 2001 to Radio Fórmula.

XEACN migrated to FM in 2011 and In March 2017, Radio Fórmula launched the Trión format in four cities, including León.
