= XEEMM-AM =

Radio station in Salamanca, Guanajuato, Mexico

Simulcast of XHYA-FM 91.9
- Salamanca, Guanajuato; Mexico
- Frequency: 810 kHz
- Branding: La Picosa

Programming
- Format: Regional Mexican

Ownership
- Owner: Radio Grupo Antonio Contreras; (Marco Antonio Héctor Contreras Santoscoy)

History
- First air date: November 8, 1983
- Call sign meaning: Enrique Mejía Méndez

Technical information
- Class: C
- Power: 1 kW day/0.5 kW night

Links
- Website: radioirapuato.com/estaciones/salmantina/index.html

XEEMM-AM is a radio station on 810 AM in Salamanca, Guanajuato. It is owned by Radio Grupo Antonio Contreras and carries a Regional Mexican format known as La Picosa.

== History ==
Logo as Salmatina 810, used until 2026

The original XEEMM concession was awarded to Enrique Mejía Méndez on November 8, 1983. XEEMM operated as a 250-watt daytimer on 1210 kHz. Contreras became the concessionaire in 1993, and XEEMM was moved to 810 with 4 kW during the day and 250 watts at night later in the 90s.
