= KTWH-LP =

- Two Harbors, Minnesota; United States
- Broadcast area: Metro Two Harbors
- Frequency: 99.5 MHz
- Branding: Two Harbors Community Radio

Programming
- Format: Variety

Ownership
- Owner: Two Harbors Community Radio

History
- First air date: September 13, 2015
- Call sign meaning: Two Harbors

Technical information
- Licensing authority: FCC
- Facility ID: 192672
- Class: L1
- ERP: 100 watts
- HAAT: −2 meters (−6.6 ft)
- Transmitter coordinates: 47°2′30.30″N 91°40′6.40″W

Links
- Public license information: LMS
- Webcast: Listen live
- Website: ktwh.org

KTWH-LP is a Variety formatted broadcast radio station licensed to and serving Two Harbors, Minnesota. KTWH-LP is owned and operated by Two Harbors Community Radio.
