= XHLG-FM =

Radio station in León, Guanajuato, Mexico

- León, Guanajuato; Mexico
- Frequency: 98.3 MHz
- Branding: Ultra FM

Programming
- Format: Pop

Ownership
- Owner: Promomedios León; (Radio Promotora de León, S.A.)
- Sister stations: XHOI-FM, XHELG-FM, XHLEO-FM

History
- First air date: May 19, 1970 (concession)
- Call sign meaning: "León Guanajuato"

Technical information
- Class: B
- ERP: 40 kW
- HAAT: 162.8 meters (534 ft)
- Transmitter coordinates: 21°09′36.19″N 101°42′58.89″W

Links
- Webcast: Listen live
- Website: ultrafm.mx

XHLG-FM is a radio station on 98.3 FM in León, Guanajuato, Mexico. The station is owned by Promomedios León and known as Ultra FM with a pop format.

== History ==
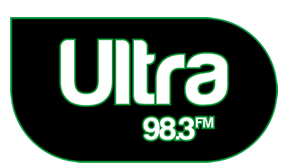
Logo as Ultra FM, used until 2026

XHLG received its first concession on May 19, 1970. It had previously been known as "LG FM Romántica", a romantic music format.
