= WFPM-LP =

Coordinates: 42.309°N 85.171°W

- Battle Creek, Michigan; United States
- Broadcast area
- Frequency: 99.5 MHz

Programming
- Format: Urban Gospel

Ownership
- Owner: First Pentecostal Church of God in Christ

History
- First air date: September 2002
- Call sign meaning: We're First Pentecostal Ministries

Technical information
- Licensing authority: FCC
- Class: L1
- ERP: 100 watts
- HAAT: 26.5 meters
- Translators: 99.9 W260BH (Albion); 103.7 W279BP (Jackson)

Links
- Public license information: LMS
- Website: firstpen.org

WFPM-LP (99.5 FM) is a low power radio station broadcasting an urban gospel format. Licensed to Battle Creek, Michigan, it first began broadcasting in 2002. WFPM also broadcasts on translators at 103.7 FM in Jackson and 99.9 FM in Albion.

== Sources ==
- Michiguide.com - WFPM-LP History
