= XHYA-FM =

Radio station in Irapuato, Guanajuato, Mexico

Simulcast of XEEMM-AM 810
- Irapuato, Guanajuato; Mexico
- Frequency: 91.9 MHz
- Branding: La Picosa

Programming
- Format: Regional Mexican

Ownership
- Owner: Radio Grupo Antonio Contreras; (Compañía Radiofónica del Centro, S.A. de C.V.)

History
- First air date: July 14, 1964 (concession)

Technical information
- ERP: 3 kW
- Transmitter coordinates: 20°37′54.39″N 101°21′41.27″W

Links
- Website: www.radioirapuato.com

XHYA-FM is a radio station on 91.9 FM in Irapuato, Guanajuato. It is owned by Radio Grupo Antonio Contreras and carries a Regional Mexican format known as La Picosa.

== History ==
XHYA began as XEYA-AM 1470, receiving its concession on July 14, 1964. XEYA would later be moved to 1180.

XEYA migrated to FM in 2011 on 91.9 MHz.
