= XEZH-AM =

Radio station in Salamanca, Guanajuato, Mexico

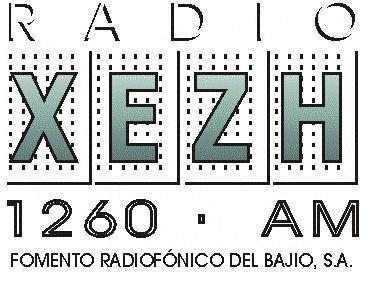

Salamanca, Guanajuato; Mexico
- Frequency: 1260 kHz
- Branding: XEZH

Ownership
- Owner: Fomento Radiofónico del Bajío, S.A.

History
- First air date: May 15, 1966

Technical information
- Power: 1 kW day/0.25 kW night

XEZH-AM is a radio station on 1260 kHz in Salamanca, Guanajuato.

== History ==
XEZH came to air on May 15, 1966, after receiving its concession on October 17, 1964.

The station was originally approved for FM migration as XHEZH-FM 92.5, but it declined to accept the offer; instead, the IFT offered the frequency to XESAG-AM 1040, which became XHSAG-FM 92.5 in November 2021.
