= XHLEO-FM =

Radio station in León, Guanajuato, Mexico

- León, Guanajuato; Mexico
- Frequency: 105.1 MHz
- Branding: La Rancherita

Programming
- Format: Regional Mexican

Ownership
- Owner: Promomedios; (Radio Sistema del Bajío, S.A.)
- Sister stations: XHOI-FM, XHLG-FM, XHELG-FM

History
- First air date: August 22, 1962 (concession)
- Former call signs: XELEO-AM
- Former frequencies: 1110 kHz (1962-2014)
- Call sign meaning: LEÓn

Technical information
- Class: B1
- ERP: 3 kW
- HAAT: 151.6 meters (497 ft)
- Transmitter coordinates: 21°09′36.19″N 101°42′58.89″W

Links
- Webcast: Listen live
- Website: larancheritafm.mx

XHLEO-FM is a radio station on 105.1 FM in León, Guanajuato. It is owned by Promomedios and carries a Regional Mexican format known as La Rancherita.

== History ==
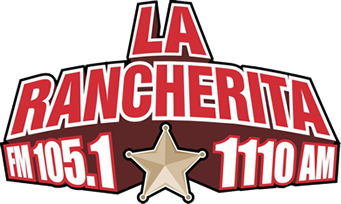
Logo as La Rancherita, used until 2014

XELEO-AM 1110 received its concession on August 22, 1962. It was approved for its migration to FM in 2011 as XHLEO-FM on 105.1.
