= XHEFG-FM =

Radio station in Celaya, Guanajuato, Mexico

- Celaya, Guanajuato; Mexico
- Frequency: 89.1 MHz
- Branding: La Mejor FM

Programming
- Format: Regional Mexican
- Affiliations: MVS Radio

Ownership
- Owner: TVR Comunicaciones (pending sale to Promomedios); (Señal 84, S.A. de C.V.)
- Operator: Promomedios
- Sister stations: XHEOF-FM, XHZN-FM

History
- First air date: April 21, 1963 (concession)
- Former call signs: XEFG-AM
- Former frequencies: 840 kHz

Technical information
- ERP: 6 kW
- Transmitter coordinates: 20°31′10.41″N 100°48′5.29″W

Links
- Webcast: Listen live
- Website: lamejor.com.mx

XHEFG-FM is a radio station on 89.1 FM in Celaya, in the Mexican state of Guanajuato. It is owned by TVR Comunicaciones, operated by Promomedios, and carries the La Mejor FM regional Mexican format from MVS Radio.

== History ==
XEFG-AM received its concession on April 21, 1963. It was owned by Sergio Olivares Gascón and broadcast on 840 kHz. Known for a time as Radio Juventud, the station donated the first transmitter for the new XEITC-AM in the late 1970s — the first radio station ever owned by a technological institute in Mexico.

In 2011, XEFG was approved to migrate to FM.
