= WRYC =

Radio station in Frisco City, Alabama

- Frisco City, Alabama; United States
- Frequency: 92.5 MHz
- Branding: Rooster Country 92.5 WRYC FM

Programming
- Format: Country

Ownership
- Owner: Damon L. Collins; (Blackbelt Broadcasting, Inc.)

Technical information
- Licensing authority: FCC
- Facility ID: 191570
- Class: A
- ERP: 300 watts
- HAAT: 48 metres (157 ft)
- Transmitter coordinates: 31°25′59″N 87°24′5″W

Links
- Public license information: Public file; LMS

WRYC (92.5 FM) is a radio station licensed to serve the community of Frisco City, Alabama. The station is owned by Damon L. Collins, through licensee Blackbelt Broadcasting, Inc. It airs a country music format.

The station was assigned the WRYC call letters by the Federal Communications Commission on November 22, 2016.
