= KOWS-LP =

- Occidental, California; United States
- Frequency: 92.5 MHz
- Branding: KOWS Radio

Programming
- Format: Variety

Ownership
- Owner: KOWS Community Radio

Technical information
- Licensing authority: FCC
- Facility ID: 124420
- Class: L1
- ERP: 3 watts
- HAAT: 197.3 meters (647 ft)
- Transmitter coordinates: 38°24′43.50″N 122°57′24.66″W

Links
- Public license information: LMS
- Webcast: Listen live
- Website: kows92-5.org

KOWS-LP (92.5 FM) is a radio station licensed to serve the community of Occidental, California. The station is owned by KOWS Community Radio. It airs a variety format. The current program director is Don Campau, who hosts his own program No Pigeonholes EXP.

The station was assigned the KOWS-LP call letters by the Federal Communications Commission on September 22, 2005.

== History ==
=== Studio and Transmitter ===
KOWS Community Radio serves Western Sonoma County, California at 92.5 FM with antenna and transmitter positioned along the Highway 12 corridor, just southeast of Freestone, California. The studio facilities first opened, broadcasting from the second floor of Howard's Café in Occidental, California. It later moved to a location in downtown Occidental. At the time, it was under the umbrella of the non-profit Occidental Arts and Ecology Center and its antenna was located on the property atop a Douglas Fir tree. The studio itself would eventually relocate to downtown Sebastopol in 2015 in a classroom at the Methodist Church. In 2017, the antenna was relocated from its OAEC site to a site located on private property adjacent to Highway 12.

The studio relocated once again to its current location in downtown Santa Rosa, just on the outskirts of the Cherry Street Historic District in downtown Santa Rosa. The move occurred on February 1, 2019.

=== Broadcast ===
The original FM licensed frequency was 107.3 but was later changed to 92.5 in May, 2017. The station also has a streaming presence. Like its terrestrial counterpart it is accessible 24 hours a day and can be accessed via its web site or direct stream.

The stream can be accessed via a number of third party streaming platforms including Radio Garden, TuneIn and Radio Box. The KOWS stream can also be accessed via Radio Rethink's AirPocket mobile-friendly player whose app currently supports iPhones and Android devices with the latter's support being only a web link.

Organizational Structure

KOWS Community Radio is a 501c3 non-profit operating led by a Board of Directors. Day-to-day operations and decisions are handled by a Steering Committee of volunteers. Funding for the station is through listener donations, business underwriting, host donations and grants. All donations go directly towards day-to-day studio operations, licensing and equipment.

=== Broadcast Hosts ===
The first studio was located on the second floor of Howard's Restaurant in downtown Occidental. The first host, Robert Feuer, took to the airwaves in January 2008 with founder (who has since moved on) Phil Tymon by his side assisting with the console. According to Feuer, “I played some John Mayall…and Surrealistic Pillow by Jefferson Airplane.” He went on to host his blues show on KOWS, “Blues Up The River” for the next eleven years.

KOWS has gone on to a 24x7 FM and streaming entity. It has a history of local and global hosts, among them, its recent President, Arnold Levine, author and host of his Friday evening show Tommy's Holiday Camp”. His book, Banned By the BBC : How I Became a Radio Pirate tells the tale of a young British chap's memoirs of 1970s London.

Don Campau, the station's Program Director and host of No Pigeonholes EXP, has been a proponent of underground music, specifically “Cassette Culture” and his Living Archive of Underground Music has a global following and flavors some of the syndicated shows that KOWS features from around the world.

KOWS hosts are a reflection of the Northern California community from where it calls home. They have ranged in age from 9 to 90 and have included musicians including Phil Lawrence, David Rosen, Teresa Tudury and others.

The station's aspiration motto, adopted almost ten years ago, is “Free Speech. No Bull”.
