= KFSL-LP =

- Fossil, Oregon; United States
- Broadcast area: Metro Fossil
- Frequency: 99.5 MHz
- Branding: 99.5 KFSL

Programming
- Format: Classic Country

Ownership
- Owner: Wheeler County Broadcasters Association

History
- First air date: June 14, 2005
- Call sign meaning: Fossil

Technical information
- Licensing authority: FCC
- Facility ID: 134334
- Class: L1
- Power: 100 watts
- HAAT: −84.9 meters (−279 ft)
- Transmitter coordinates: 45°0′29.40″N 120°12′39.00″W

Links
- Public license information: LMS
- Webcast: KFSL-LP Webstream
- Website: KFSL-LP Online

KFSL-LP is a Classic Country formatted broadcast radio station. The station is licensed to and serving Fossil in Oregon. KFSL-LP is owned and operated by Wheeler County Broadcasters Association.

== History ==
The Fossil School District 21J, which originally launched the station back in 2005, donated the station to the Wheeler County Broadcasters Association on June 4, 2021.
