= KIVE-LP =

- Aurora, Nebraska; United States
- Frequency: 92.5 MHz

Programming
- Format: Religious
- Affiliations: Radio 74 Internationale

Ownership
- Owner: Dawn Adventist Broadcasting

History
- First air date: 2005-09-08

Technical information
- Licensing authority: FCC
- Facility ID: 135537
- Class: L1
- ERP: 100 watts
- HAAT: 6.8 meters (22 ft)
- Transmitter coordinates: 40°52′18″N 98°0′9″W

Links
- Public license information: LMS

KIVE-LP (92.5 FM) is a radio station licensed to Aurora, Nebraska, United States. The station is an affiliate of Radio 74 Internationale and is currently owned by Dawn Adventist Broadcasting.
