= WGVV-LP =

Radio station in Rock Island, Illinois

Coordinates: 41.490°N 90.537°W

WGVV 92.5 FM
- Rock Island, Illinois; United States
- Broadcast area: Quad Cities
- Frequency: 92.5 MHz (HD Radio)
- Branding: Groove 92.5

Programming
- Format: Urban contemporary

History
- First air date: 2004
- Call sign meaning: "Groove"

Technical information
- Licensing authority: FCC
- Facility ID: 125960
- Class: FL
- ERP: 66 watts
- HAAT: 37 meters (121 ft)

Links
- Public license information: 92.5 FM Public file; LMS
- Website: groove925.com

WGVV (92.5 FM, "Groove 92.5") is an FM radio station licensed to serve the community of Rock Island, Illinois. The station is owned by Quad Cities Community Broadcasting. It airs an urban contemporary music format.

The station was assigned the WGVV 92.5 FM call sign by the Federal Communications Commission on May 8, 2003.

WGVV 92.5 FM is licensed for HD radio (hybrid digital) operation.
