= Harlow E. Bundy House =

Historic house in New York, United States

- U.S. National Register of Historic Places
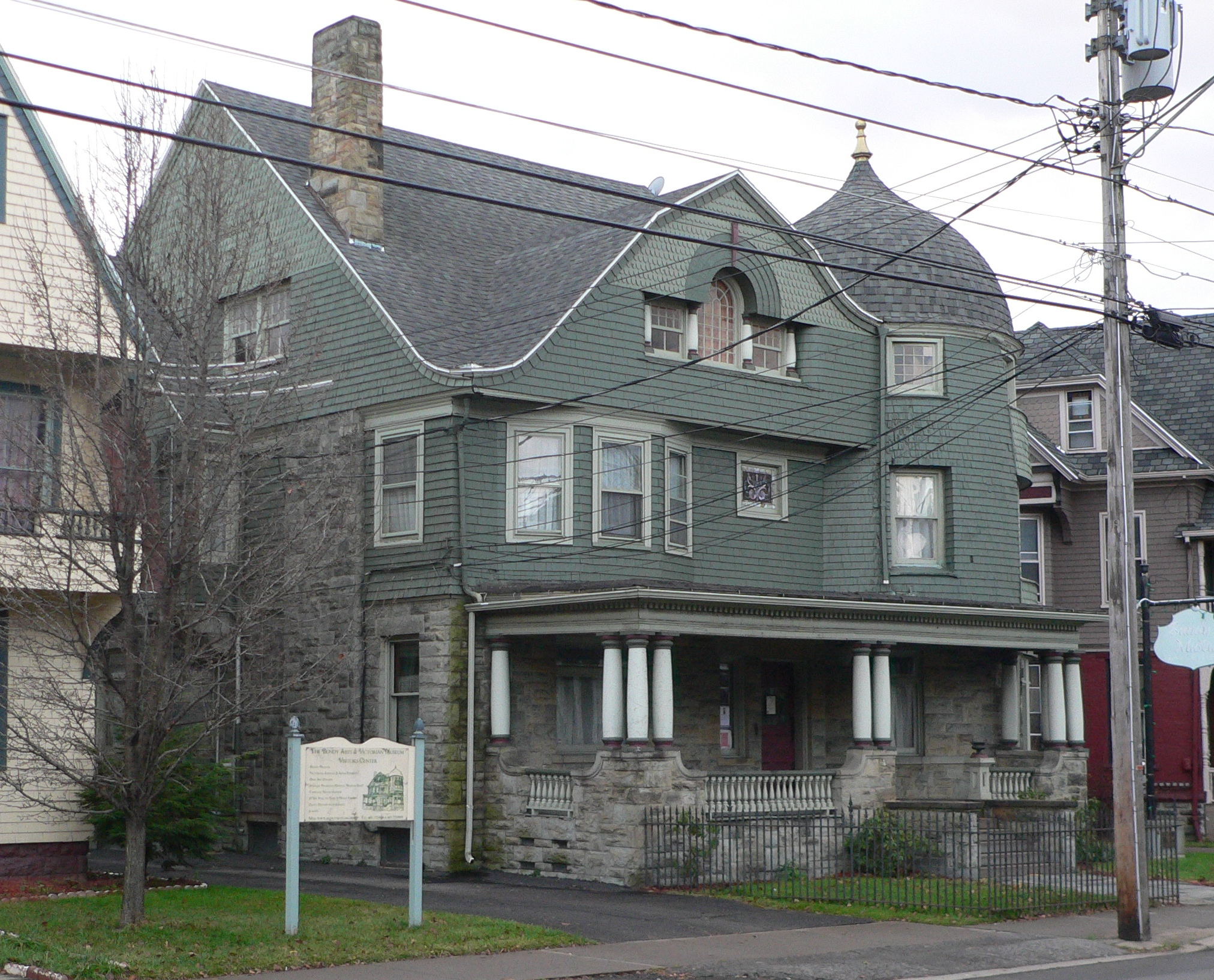
- The house in November 2011

- Location within New York Location within the United States
- Location: 129 Main St., Binghamton, New York
- Coordinates: 42°06′06″N 75°55′41″W
- Area: Less than 1 acre (0.40 ha)
- Built: 1893
- Architect: Elfred Hull Bartoo
- Architectural style: Queen Anne
- NRHP reference No.: 11000269
- Added to NRHP: May 11, 2011

The Harlow E. Bundy House (also known as the Bundy Museum of History and Art) is a historic house located at 129 Main Street in Binghamton, Broome County, New York.

== Description and history ==
It was built in 1893, and is a 2 1/2-story, irregularly massed, Queen Anne style frame dwelling. It features cut stone veneer, a variety of decorative shingles, and a tall conical corner tower. It was built by Binghamton businessman Harlow Bundy (1856-1914), who owned the Bundy Manufacturing Company, a predecessor of IBM.

It was listed on the National Register of Historic Places on May 11, 2011.

== Bundy Museum of History and Art ==
The Bundy Museum of History and Art features exhibits about the Bundy Manufacturing Company and its founders including a display of time recording clocks in a recreation of the Bundy Manufacturing Company's 1893 World's Fair booth; a gallery with ancestral and ceremonial African artifact; a vintage 20th-century barber shop room; changing exhibits about local history; and the Southern Tier Broadcasters Hall of Fame which honors such pioneers as Rod Serling, Richard Deacon and Bill Parker. The museum's open art gallery for works by upcoming as well as established artists. The museum also hosts the Rod Serling Archive, with original wire images, TV and film props, memorabilia and personal items.
