= CJRH-FM =

First Nations community radio station in Waskaganish, Quebec

Coordinates: 51°28′36″N 78°41′26″W

- Waskaganish, Quebec; Canada
- Frequency: 92.5 MHz

Programming
- Format: First Nations community radio

Ownership
- Owner: Waskaganish Eeyou Telecommunications Association

Technical information
- ERP: 9.571 kW average 38.016 kW peak
- HAAT: 84 metres (276 ft)

Links
- Website: cjrh-radio.ca

CJRH-FM is a First Nations community radio station that operates at 92.5 FM in Waskaganish, Quebec, Canada.

The station is owned by Waskaganish Eeyou Telecommunications Association.

CJRH was a former callsign of a radio station in Toronto, Ontario, which is known today as CFIQ.
