= KHMB =

- Hamburg, Arkansas; United States
- Frequency: 99.5 MHz
- Branding: Q-Lite 99.5

Programming
- Format: Adult contemporary
- Affiliations: AP News

Ownership
- Owner: R&M Broadcasting

History
- First air date: 1996
- Call sign meaning: HaMBurg

Technical information
- Licensing authority: FCC
- Facility ID: 34020
- Class: A
- ERP: 3,200 watts
- HAAT: 95 meters (312 ft)
- Transmitter coordinates: 33°17′18.6″N 91°52′45.5″W

Links
- Public license information: Public file; LMS
- Webcast: Listen Live
- Website: qliteradio.com

KHMB (99.5 FM) is a radio station broadcasting an adult contemporary music format. Licensed to Hamburg, Arkansas, United States. The station is currently owned by R&M Broadcasting.
