= KBEY =

- Burnet, Texas; United States
- Broadcast area: Greater Austin
- Frequency: 103.9 MHz
- Branding: "K-Bey 103.9"

Programming
- Format: Country music
- Affiliations: Compass Media Networks; Westwood One

Ownership
- Owner: John Daniel and Merri Lee Alvey; (Victory Publishing Company, Ltd.)

History
- First air date: January 7, 2012

Technical information
- Licensing authority: FCC
- Facility ID: 40764
- Class: A
- ERP: 1,800 watts
- HAAT: 184 meters (604 ft)
- Transmitter coordinates: 30.74073°N 98.31819°W

Links
- Public license information: Public file; LMS
- Webcast: Listen live
- Website: kbeyfm.com

KBEY (103.9 MHz) is a commercial radio station broadcasting a country music format. Licensed to Burnet, Texas, United States, it serving the Greater Austin area. The station is currently owned by John Daniel and Merri Lee Alvey, through licensee Victory Publishing Company, Ltd.
