= XHJUA-FM =

Radio station of the Universidad de Guanajuato

Guanajuato, Guanajuato, Mexico; Mexico
- Broadcast area: Guanajuato
- Frequency: (see table)
- Branding: Radio Universidad de Guanajuato

Programming
- Format: College radio

Ownership
- Owner: Universidad de Guanajuato

Technical information
- Power: 1,000 watts (AM)
- ERP: (see table)

Links
- Website: http://www.radiouniversidad.ugto.mx/

XHJUA-FM 100.7 is a radio station in Guanajuato, Guanajuato. It is the flagship of the Radio Universidad de Guanajuato service, which is also relayed on XEUG-AM 970 in Guanajuato, XHLTO-FM 91.1 in León and XHSML-FM 91.3 in San Miguel de Allende.

== History ==
The idea of creating a UGTO radio station was first floated in 1958, but XEUG-AM did not come on air until its formal inauguration on February 21, 1961, by President Adolfo López Mateos. The initial equipment was rudimentary and was used to broadcast four hours of programming a day from the university's central building.

The 1970s saw a new studio facility in 1970, new professional equipment (in 1974) and the entrance of Diego León Rábago as director. Under Rábago the station became the official broadcaster of the Festival Internacional Cervantino.

The FM radio stations were awarded to the university by the state of Guanajuato in 1999; the stations, put on air in the 1980s by the state government, had previously been part of a radio service known as "La Voz de Guanajuato". In 2006, the station began 24-hour broadcasting.

XHLTO was originally assigned 104.1 MHz but was built on 91.1 instead, to not conflict with XHMD-FM.

== Transmitters ==
Radio Universidad de Guanajuato has four transmitters, three on AM and one on FM:

| Callsign | Frequency | City | ERP (AM Power) | Transmitter Coordinates |
|---|---|---|---|---|
| XEUG-AM | 970 | Guanajuato | 1 kW (day/night power) | 21°02′09.3″N 101°16′32.8″W |
| XHJUA-FM | 100.7 | Guanajuato | 18.63 kW | 20°59′44.8″N 101°14′13.7″W |
| XHLTO-FM | 91.1 | León | 15 kW | 21°09′55″N 101°42′38.0″W |
| XHSML-FM | 91.3 | San Miguel de Allende | 3 kW | 20°56′07.9″N 100°43′59.3″W |
