= KWQR =

Radio station in Willcox, Arizona

KHTO
- Willcox, Arizona; United States
- Frequency: 92.5 MHz
- Branding: KWQR 92.5 FM

Programming
- Format: Classic hits

Ownership
- Owner: Mark Lucke; (Versailles Community Broadcasting, Inc.)

History
- First air date: 2017

Technical information
- Licensing authority: FCC
- Facility ID: 184846
- Class: A
- ERP: 3,000 watts
- HAAT: 6 metres (20 ft) horizontal polarization only
- Transmitter coordinates: 32°16′1″N 109°50′0″W

Links
- Public license information: Public file; LMS

KWQR (92.5 FM) is a radio station licensed to serve the community of Willcox, Arizona in the United States. The station is owned by Mark Lucke, through licensee Versailles Community Broadcasting, Inc., and airs a classic hits format described as "X-Wave".

The station was assigned the KWQR call letters by the Federal Communications Commission on March 9, 2017.

The station has since been sold and calls changed to KHTO.
