= KQLH-LP =

Radio station in Yucaipa, California

- Yucaipa, California; United States
- Broadcast area: Inland Empire
- Frequency: 92.5 MHz
- Branding: Studio 92.5 FM

Programming
- Format: Nostalgia

Ownership
- Owner: Arrowhead Alliance of the Inland Empire

History
- First air date: January 26, 2016

Technical information
- Licensing authority: FCC
- Facility ID: 755689
- ERP: 100 watts
- HAAT: 15 meters (49 ft)

Links
- Public license information: LMS
- Webcast: Listen live
- Website: kqlhradio.com

KQLH-LP (92.5 FM) is a low-power radio station branded as "KQLH Studio 92.5 FM". The station is operated by Arrowhead Alliance of the Inland Empire broadcasting a favorites music format with songs from the 1950s to the 1980s. The station is licensed to Yucaipa, California and broadcasts to the Inland Empire area.

It features former Atlanta morning man and Georgia Radio Hall of Member Rick Ruhl with the "Rick in the morning, morning show" from 6AM until 9 AM. KQLH LPFM was built by Mark Westwood, who is also General Manager of NBC affiliated KCAA 1050 am and 106.5 FM. Mark also does middays on Studio 92.5.

News Article: Yucaipa's only radio station is up and running

The Internal Revenue Service finds it to be a 501(c) organization, underwriting donations may be tax deductible under section 501 (c) 3 of the Internal Revenue Code (consult tax advisor). The station has a policy of affirmative action and equal opportunity. There are no paid employees.
