= DXKG =

Radyo Rapido (DXKG)
- Koronadal; Philippines
- Broadcast area: Northern South Cotabato and surrounding areas
- Frequency: 92.5 MHz
- Branding: 92.5 Radyo Rapido

Programming
- Languages: Hiligaynon, Filipino
- Format: Contemporary MOR, News, Talk

Ownership
- Owner: Sarraga Integrated and Management Corporation

History
- First air date: 2019

Technical information
- Licensing authority: NTC
- Power: 5 kW

92.5 Radyo Rapido (DXKG 92.5 MHz) is an FM station owned and operated by Sarraga Integrated and Management Corporation. Its studios and transmitter are located at Rafael Alunan Ave., Brgy. Poblacion, Koronadal.
