= XHGX-FM =

Radio station in San Luis de la Paz, Guanajuato, Mexico

- San Luis de la Paz, Guanajuato; Mexico
- Frequency: 92.5 MHz
- Branding: La Mejor

Programming
- Format: Grupera
- Affiliations: MVS Radio

Ownership
- Owner: Fernando Roberto González Espinoza

History
- First air date: August 14, 1966 (concession)

Technical information
- Class: AA
- ERP: 3 kW
- Transmitter coordinates: 21°13′35.48″N 100°29′38″W

Links
- Website: lamejor.com.mx/sanluisdelapaz

XHGX-FM is a radio station on 92.5 FM in San Luis de la Paz, Guanajuato, Mexico. XHGX carries the La Mejor grupera format from MVS Radio.

== History ==
XHGX began as XEGX-AM 1480, which received its concession on August 14, 1966. It later moved to 800 kHz.

After steady power increases over the years, XEGX migrated to FM in 2011 on 92.5 MHz In November 2016, the station became the Regional Mexican format known La Mejor from MVS Radio.
