= XHSD-FM (Guanajuato) =

Radio station in Silao–León, Guanajuato, Mexico

XHSD-FM/XESD-AM
- Silao, Guanajuato; Mexico
- Broadcast area: León, Guanajuato
- Frequencies: 99.3 MHz; 1530 kHz
- Branding: @FM (Arroba FM)

Programming
- Format: Pop music in English and Spanish

Ownership
- Owner: Grupo Radiorama; (JACED, S.A. de C.V.)
- Sister stations: XHGTO-FM, XHOO-FM

History
- First air date: 1964; 1994 (FM)

Technical information
- Class: B1 (FM); B (AM)
- Power: 10 kW day 0.1 kW night
- ERP: 10 kW
- Transmitter coordinates: 20°59′27.9″N 101°31′06.9″W

Links
- Webcast: Listen live
- Website: arroba.fm

XHSD-FM/XESD-AM is a combo radio station on 99.3 FM and 1530 AM in Silao, Guanajuato, Mexico, primarily serving León. It is owned by Grupo Radiorama and carries a pop music format in English and Spanish known as @FM Arroba FM.

== History ==
The concession for XESD-AM was awarded in January 1964. The FM counterpart was authorized in 1994.

In March 2018, Multimedios Radio took over operation of three Grupo Radiorama stations in León, Guanajuato, including XHSD-FM/XESD-AM. Under ownership of Grupo Multimedios, the station aired its La Lupe Regional Mexican format. The change was undone when Multimedios stopped leasing several stations from Radiorama on August 1, 2020.
