= WUSR =

Coordinates: 41.4281°N 75.7468°W

- Scranton, Pennsylvania; United States
- Broadcast area: Scranton / Wilkes-Barre, Pennsylvania
- Frequency: 99.5 MHz
- Branding: Royal Radio

Programming
- Format: College radio

Ownership
- Owner: University of Scranton

History
- First air date: 1993
- Call sign meaning: University of Scranton Radio

Technical information
- Licensing authority: FCC
- Facility ID: 69198
- Class: A
- ERP: 300 watts
- HAAT: 376 meters (1,234 ft)

Links
- Public license information: Public file; LMS
- Website: scranton.edu/wusr

WUSR, also known as 99.5 WUSR Scranton Royal Radio, is a college radio station broadcasting at 99.5 FM in Scranton, Pennsylvania. It is owned and operated by the University of Scranton.

== Programming ==
Like many college radio stations, 99.5 WUSR Scranton Royal Radio carries a diverse range of programming. During the week from 8-10 a.m., the Pell Radio Reading Service, which is being offered in partnership with the Department of Communication and the Lackawanna Branch of the Pennsylvania Association for the Blind, orates daily news updates from the local Times-Tribune newspaper in Scranton, Pa.

The station primarily broadcasts several hours of Alternative, Loud Rock, Urban, Sports Talk and General Talk shows. All shows for each genre last two hours. Weekends primarily consist of freeform programming, with many specialty shows focusing on musical genres and topics such as soundtracks, Blues, and Polka.
