= XHOO-FM =

Radio station in Guanajuato, Guanajuato

- Guanajuato, Guanajuato; Mexico
- Frequency: 102.3 MHz
- Branding: Fiesta Mexicana

Programming
- Format: Regional Mexican

Ownership
- Owner: Grupo Radiorama; (XHOO-FM, S.A. de C.V.)
- Sister stations: XHSD-FM, XHGTO-FM

History
- First air date: October 24, 1990

Technical information
- Class: C1
- ERP: 25 kW
- HAAT: 272.42 meters (893.8 ft)
- Transmitter coordinates: 21°03′22″N 101°20′30.4″W

XHOO-FM is a radio station on 102.3 FM in Guanajuato, Guanajuato. XHOO is owned by Grupo Radiorama and is known as Fiesta Mexicana with a Regional Mexican format.

== History ==
XHOO received its concession on November 28, 1988. The station signed on October 24, 1990 from a tower on Cerro Aldana and carried the name Fiesta Mexicana with a Regional Mexican format. It was the second sign-on of 1990 conducted by the Radio Cima-Crystal station group; XHML-FM, with its transmitter in León itself, had gone on air five months prior. In 1999 and 2000, it increased its power from 19 kW to 25 kW.

In 1992, XHOO was moved to Cerro del Cubilete, which allowed the station a regional coverage area and allowed it to pick up a wider audience than that available to it in the state capital. Eventually, all the stations in Radio Cima-Crystal, including XHGTO-FM and XHVLO-FM, had to move their studios to León, which allowed for them to be successful in the most lucrative market in the state.

On March 2, 2018, local operations of XHOO, XHSD-FM and XHGTO by Radiorama Bajío ceased due to a decision by the Radiorama corporate to lease more than half the cluster to Multimedios Radio. On March 5, the La Caliente Regional Mexican format replaced Fiesta Mexicana in León. The change was undone when Multimedios decided to stop leasing several stations from Radiorama on August 1, 2020.
