= XHBO-FM =

Radio station in Irapuato, Guanajuato

- Irapuato, Guanajuato; Mexico
- Frequency: 105.5 MHz
- Branding: Fiesta Mexicana

Programming
- Format: Regional Mexican

Ownership
- Owner: Grupo Radiorama; (Radio BO, S.A. de C.V.)

History
- First air date: January 16, 1937 (concession)

Technical information
- ERP: 3 kW
- HAAT: 21.92 meters
- Transmitter coordinates: 20°40′57.26″N 101°21′10.35″W

Links
- Webcast: XHBO-FM

XHBO-FM is a radio station on 105.5 FM in Irapuato, Guanajuato. The station is owned by Grupo Radiorama and carries a Regional Mexican format known as Fiesta Mexicana.

== History ==
Logo used when XHBO carried Radiorama's @FM (Arroba FM) pop format

XEBO-AM received its concession on January 16, 1937, broadcasting with 600 watts on 1330 kHz. By the 1960s it was operating with 1,000 watts, and ultimately in the 1990s it changed to 5,000 watts.

In October 2011, a serious strike began at XEBO over unpaid salaries, preventing its AM-FM migration and shutting the station down for two years. On December 12, 2013, XEBO's employees signed an agreement to sell the station to Grupo Radiorama. When XEBO returned to the air, it had carried out its AM-FM migration and become XHBO-FM on 105.5.

For some time until 2015, XEBO/XHBO's transmitter was originally located in San José de la Sonaja, to the south of town. It was relocated to Irapuato that year. In 2016, the successors of Alfonso Martínez Vela transferred the station to a new concessionaire.

In March 2018, XHBO-FM was taken over by Multimedios Radio as part of MM beginning operations of the Radiorama Bajío cluster in León. Multimedios immediately replaced the @FM pop music format, owned by Radiorama, with its La Lupe format of Regional Mexican music from the 80s, 90s and 2000s.

The change was undone when Multimedios stopped leasing several stations from Radiorama on August 1, 2020.
