= KSJC-LP =

Radio station in Silverton, Colorado

- Silverton, Colorado; United States
- Broadcast area: Silverton, Colorado
- Frequency: 92.5 MHz
- Branding: Mountain Radio 92.5

Programming
- Format: Freeform
- Affiliations: Pacifica Radio

Ownership
- Owner: Silverton Community Radio

History
- First air date: 2003
- Call sign meaning: San Juan County

Technical information
- Licensing authority: FCC
- Facility ID: 132167
- Class: L1
- Power: 100 watts
- HAAT: −440.8 meters (−1,446 ft)
- Transmitter coordinates: 37°48′45″N 107°40′0″W

Links
- Public license information: LMS
- Webcast: Listen live

KSJC-LP is a Freeform formatted broadcast radio station licensed to and serving Silverton, Colorado, United States. KSJC-LP is owned and operated by Silverton Community Radio.
