= XHGTO-FM =

Radio station in Guanajuato, Guanajuato

XHGTO-FM / XEGTO-AM
Guanajuato City, Guanajuato; Mexico
- Broadcast area: León; Guanajuato City
- Frequency: 95.9 FM; 590 AM
- Branding: Éxtasis Digital

Programming
- Format: English classic hits

Ownership
- Owner: Grupo Radiorama; (XEGTO, S.A.)
- Sister stations: XHSD-FM, XHOO-FM, XHXV-FM

History
- First air date: November 21, 1947; 1994 (FM)
- Former call signs: XEWZ-AM
- Call sign meaning: GuanajuaTO

Technical information
- Class: B1 (FM); B (AM)
- Power: 10 kW day 0.25 kW night (AM)
- ERP: 1 kW (FM)

Links
- Webcast: Listen live
- Website: extasisdigital.mx

XHGTO-FM/XEGTO-AM is a combo AM/FM radio station in Guanajuato City, Guanajuato, Mexico.

== History ==
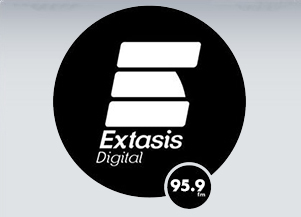
Final Éxtasis Digital logo, used only in León and Celaya until March 2018

XEGTO received its first concession on November 21, 1947. It was initially known as XEWZ, owned by La Voz de Guanajuato, S.A. and broadcasting on 600 kHz. By the 1960s, it had been sold to Jorge Zuñiga Campos.

In the 1990s, the station moved to 590, added an FM counterpart and was sold to Radiorama. The FM combo originally broadcast on 103.9 MHz.

Until 2015, this station carried a format known as Tu Recuerdo, which moved to XHVLO-FM 101.5. At that time, the Éxtasis Digital format that had been airing on XHVLO moved to XHGTO.

On March 2, 2018, it was announced Éxtasis Digital would cease operations after 24 years on the air. While it was announced that Éxtasis Digital would go silent at 10 AM on March 3, it was another two days before any changes occurred. The announcement also coincided with other station closure announcements made by Radiorama Bajío. On March 5, it was replaced with Multimedios's Hits FM pop format as part of Multimedios Radio's takeover of half of the Radiorama Bajío cluster. The change was undone when Multimedios stopped leasing several stations from Radiorama on August 1, 2020.
