= XHELG-FM =

Radio station in León, Guanajuato, Mexico

- León, Guanajuato; Mexico
- Frequency: 95.5 MHz
- Branding: LG La Grande

Programming
- Format: Spanish adult hits

Ownership
- Owner: Promomedios; (Radio Impulsora del Centro, S.A.)
- Sister stations: XHOI-FM, XHLG-FM, XHLEO-FM

History
- First air date: January 31, 1946 (concession)
- Former call signs: XELG-AM
- Former frequencies: 680 kHz (1946-2014)
- Call sign meaning: León, Guanajuato

Technical information
- Class: AA
- ERP: 6 kW
- HAAT: 153.6 meters (504 ft)
- Transmitter coordinates: 21°10′22″N 101°42′58.69″W

Links
- Webcast: Listen live
- Website: lgfm.mx

XHELG-FM is a radio station on 95.5 FM in León, Guanajuato. XHELG is owned by Promomedios and carries a Spanish-language adult hits format known as LG La Grande.

== History ==
Logo as LG La Grande, used until 2014

XHLG began as XELG-AM, with a concession awarded on January 31, 1946. It operated on 680 kHz with 10 kW during the day and 5 kW at night until the AM-FM migration in 2012.
