= 90.7 FM =

FM radio frequency

The following radio stations broadcast on FM frequency 90.7 MHz:

== Argentina ==
- Asunción in Arroyo Seco, Santa Fe
- Cadena 3 Río Cuarto in Río Cuarto, Córdoba
- Ciudad in Berazategui, Buenos Aires
- Daireaux in Daireaux, Buenos Aires
- Estilo in Venado Tuerto, Santa Fe
- Fribuay in Ramos Mejía, Buenos Aires
- LRI939 Genesis in Coronel Pringles, Buenos Aires
- GPS El Camino in Buenos Aires
- Impacto in Baradero, Buenos Aires
- Integración in Olavarría, Buenos Aires
- La Base in Santa Rosa, La Pampa
- Libertad in Villa Nueva, Córdoba
- LRI323 Líder in Bigand, Santa Fe
- LRM 967 Master in Diamante, Entre Ríos
- María Del Rosario in Piñeyro, Buenos Aires
- Mix in General Pico, La Pampa
- Municipal in Añelo, Neuquén
- Nativa in Posadas, Misiones
- Punto a Punto in Córdoba
- Radio María in Famatina, La Rioja
- Radio María in San Miguel de Tucumán, Tucumán
- Radio María in Las Heras, Santa Cruz
- Radio María in Chañar Ladeado, Santa Fe
- Radio María in Tunuyán, Mendoza
- Rosario Clásica in Rosario, Santa Fe
- Saladillo in Saladillo
- LRK 428 Satélite in San Pedro de Jujuy, Jujuy

== Australia ==
- ABC Classic in Emerald, Queensland
- 3REG in Sale, Victoria
- Crow FM in Wondai, Queensland
- SYN 90.7 in Melbourne, Victoria

== Brazil ==
- Fortaleza FM (ZYS 811) in Fortaleza, Ceará

== Brunei ==
- KRISTALfm in Bandar Seri Begawan and Temburong

== Canada (Channel 214) ==
- CBFX-FM-2 in Sherbrooke, Quebec
- CBL-FM-2 in Paris, Ontario
- CBL-FM-3 in Orillia, Ontario
- CBN-FM-1 in Grand Falls-Windsor, Newfoundland and Labrador
- CBOF-FM in Ottawa, Ontario
- CBON-FM-24 in Kapuskasing, Ontario
- CBON-FM-27 in Wawa, Ontario
- CBPJ-FM-1 in Waterton Park, Alberta
- CBPS-FM in Bruce Peninsula Park, Ontario
- CBRN-FM in North Bend, British Columbia
- CBRX-FM-3 in Riviere-du-Loup, Quebec
- CFBO-FM in Moncton, New Brunswick
- CFMI-FM-1 in Whistler, British Columbia
- CHJJ-FM in Cobourg, Ontario
- CHLM-FM in Rouyn, Quebec
- CHQI-FM in Niagara on the Lake, Ontario
- CJPP-FM in Point Pelee National Park, Ontario
- VF2457 in Passmore, British Columbia
- VF7130 in Oakville, Ontario
- VF8015 in Shawinigan-Sud, Quebec

== China ==
- CNR Music Radio in Wuhan
- CNR The Voice of China in Yichun (Jiangxi)
- Huizhou Music Radio in Huizhou

== Malaysia ==
- Ai FM in Kuching, Sarawak
- Era in Langkawi, Kedah and Satun, Thailand
- Red FM in Miri, Sarawak
- TraXX FM in Kota Kinabalu, Sabah

== Mexico ==
- XHALAM-FM in Álamo-Temapache, Veracruz
- XHCCCC-FM in Culiacán, Sinaloa
- XHCPBO-FM in Santiago Jamiltepec, Oaxaca
- XHCRIS-FM in San Cristóbal de las Casas, Chiapas
- XHEZ-FM in Caborca, Sonora
- XHFL-FM in Guanajuato, Guanajuato
- XHHLL-FM in Hermosillo, Sonora
- XHHTS-FM in Tapachula, Chiapas
- XHJRZ-FM in Jerez, Zacatecas
- XHLDC-FM in Magdalena de Kino, Sonora
- XHMOE-FM in Mexicali, Baja California
- XHOY-FM in Guadalajara, Jalisco
- XHPSTZ-FM in Sombrerete, Zacatecas
- XHSIBS-FM in Huecorio, Michoacán
- XHQO-FM in Cosamaloapan, Veracruz
- XHQOO-FM in Cancún, Quintana Roo
- XHRTP-FM in San Martín Texmelucan-Puebla, Puebla
- XHTCP-FM in Tehuacán, Puebla
- XHTIM-FM in Tijuana, Baja California

== Philippines ==
- DZMB in Metro Manila
- DYAC in Cebu City
- DXBM in Davao City
- DWII-FM in Legazpi City
- DWIL in Laoag
- DXTZ in Zamboanga City

== Russia ==
- AvtoRadio in Perm
- Lipetsk FM in Lipetsk

== United States (Channel 214) ==
- KABU in Fort Totten, North Dakota
- KALX in Berkeley, California
- KAMC-FM in Soldotna, Alaska
- KANL in Baker, Oregon
- KAVW in Amarillo, Texas
- KAYE-FM in Tonkawa, Oklahoma
- KBOO in Portland, Oregon
- KBPR in Brainerd, Minnesota
- KBSQ in Mccall, Idaho
- KCBJ in Jamestown, North Dakota
- KCIR in Twin Falls, Idaho
- KCKD in Garapan, Northern Marianas Islands
- KCSE (FM) in Lamar, Colorado
- KEKL in Emporia, Kansas
- KENC in Estes Park, Colorado
- KEZB in Beaver, Utah
- KFJM in Grand Forks, North Dakota
- KFSR in Fresno, California
- KFXT in Sulphur, Oklahoma
- KGBV in Hardin, Texas
- KGFA (FM) in Great Falls, Montana
- KGHW in Onida, South Dakota
- KGUD in Longmont, Colorado
- KHOO in Hoonah, Alaska
- KHRI in Hollister, California
- KJHK in Lawrence, Kansas
- KJKT in Spearfish, South Dakota
- KJND-FM in Williston, North Dakota
- KJOV in Woodward, Oklahoma
- KJZK in Kingman, Arizona
- KKUA in Wailuku, Hawaii
- KLFH in Fort Smith, Arkansas
- KLMK in Marvell, Arkansas
- KLMQ in Placerville, Colorado
- KLRM in Melbourne, Arkansas
- KLSA in Alexandria, Louisiana
- KLSE (FM) in Rochester, Minnesota
- KLZL-LP in Ten Sleep, Wyoming
- KMBM in Polson, Montana
- KMBV in Valentine, Nebraska
- KMPB in Frisco, Colorado
- KMWR in Brookings, Oregon
- KNAA in Show Low, Arizona
- KNFA in Grand Island, Nebraska
- KNKT in Cannon AFB, New Mexico
- KNSC in Carroll, Iowa
- KNVQ in Spring Creek, Nevada
- KNWR in Ellensburg, Washington
- KOBC in Joplin, Missouri
- KODK in Kodiak, Alaska
- KOHH in San Lucy, Arizona
- KOJI in Okoboji, Iowa
- KPFK in Los Angeles, California
- KPWY in West Yellowstone, Montana
- KQBM in San Andreas, California
- KQFR in Moyle Springs, Idaho
- KQLC in Sealy, Texas
- KQLV (FM) in Santa Fe, New Mexico
- KQQJ in Juneau, Alaska
- KQSH in Dodge City, Kansas
- KRDP in Apache Junction, Arizona
- KRWG (FM) in Las Cruces, New Mexico
- KRZU in Batesville, Texas
- KSDJ in Brookings, South Dakota
- KSER in Everett, Washington
- KSLS in Dickinson, North Dakota
- KSQD in Santa Cruz, California
- KSRI in Sterling, Colorado
- KTAA in Big Sandy, Texas
- KTDL in Trinidad, Colorado
- KTTK (FM) in Lebanon, Missouri
- KUWV in Lingle, Wyoming
- KVNO in Omaha, Nebraska
- KVRT in Victoria, Texas
- KVSR in Kirksville, Missouri
- KWLJ-LP in Moorhead, Minnesota
- KWMU in Saint Louis, Missouri
- KXCR in Florence, Oregon
- KYKL in Tracy, California
- KYPR in Miles City, Montana
- KYWA in Wichita, Kansas
- KZNP in Mullan, Idaho
- KZUU in Pullman, Washington
- KZYX in Philo, California
- WACG in Augusta, Georgia
- WAUO in Hohenwald, Tennessee
- WAUS in Berrien Springs, Michigan
- WAYR in Brunswick, Georgia
- WAZU in Peoria, Illinois
- WBEQ in Morris, Illinois
- WBHL in Harrison, Michigan
- WCLH in Wilkes-Barre, Pennsylvania
- WCOM-FM in Kendall, New York
- WCRG in Williamsport, Pennsylvania
- WCVK in Bowling Green, Kentucky
- WDWC in Martins Ferry, Ohio
- WEGB in Napeague, New York
- WEHC in Emory, Virginia
- WEVN in Keene, New Hampshire
- WFAE in Charlotte, North Carolina
- WFGH in Fort Gay, West Virginia
- WFLV in West Palm Beach, Florida
- WFSL in Thomasville, Georgia
- WFUV in New York, New York
- WGLE in Lima, Ohio
- WGRW in Anniston, Alabama
- WGSN in Newport, Tennessee
- WGXC in Acra, New York
- WHAD in Delafield, Wisconsin
- WJJL in Carbon Hill, Alabama
- WJSC in Johnson, Vermont
- WKGC in Panama City, Florida
- WKKL in West Barnstable, Massachusetts
- WKPS in State College, Pennsylvania
- WKPW in Knightstown, Indiana
- WKTL in Struthers, Ohio
- WLGU in Lancaster, New York
- WLJH in Glens Falls, New York
- WLKV in Ripley, West Virginia
- WLMW in Manchester, New Hampshire
- WLYY in Louisville, Mississippi
- WMCO in New Concord, Ohio
- WMFE in Orlando, Florida
- WMRA in Harrisonburg, Virginia
- WMVM in Goodman, Wisconsin
- WMVV in Griffin, Georgia
- WNCU in Durham, North Carolina
- WNFR in Sandusky, Michigan
- WNMC in Traverse City, Michigan
- WNPH in Portsmouth, Rhode Island
- WNRK in Norwalk, Ohio
- WOTJ in Morehead City, North Carolina
- WPAI in Nanty Glo, Pennsylvania
- WPGL in Pattersonville, New York
- WPNR in Utica, New York
- WPSR (FM) in Evansville, Indiana
- WPTJ in Paris, Kentucky
- WQSG in Lafayette, Indiana
- WRTE in Chicago, Illinois
- WRTL in Ephrata, Pennsylvania
- WSDL (FM) in Ocean City, Maryland
- WSKX in Christiansted, United States Virgin Islands
- WTCC in Springfield, Massachusetts
- WTIP in Grand Marais, Minnesota
- WUVT in Blacksburg, Virginia
- WUWG in Carrollton, Georgia
- WVAS in Montgomery, Alabama
- WVKC in Galesburg, Illinois
- WVMC in Mansfield, Ohio
- WVMM in Grantham, Pennsylvania
- WVSS in Menomonie, Wisconsin
- WVTC in Randolph Center, Vermont
- WVUA in Tuscaloosa, Alabama
- WWOZ in New Orleans, Louisiana
- WWQA in Albany, Georgia
- WYBJ in Newton Grove, North Carolina
- WYFH in North Charleston, South Carolina
- WYRS in Manahawkin, New Jersey
- WZIS-FM in Terre Haute, Indiana
- WZIV in Princeton, Illinois
- WZKV in Dyersburg, Tennessee
- WZLV in Cape Charles, Virginia
- WZXY in Spring Grove, Pennsylvania
