= XHTRES-TDT =

TV station in Mexico City

- Mexico City; Mexico
- Channels: Digital: 27 (UHF); Virtual: 10
- Branding: Heraldo Televisión

Programming
- Affiliations: Heraldo Televisión

Ownership
- Owner: Grupo Imagen; (Compañía Internacional de Radio y Televisión, S.A.)
- Operator: El Heraldo de México (Heraldo Media Group)

History
- Founded: November 21, 1964 (concession)
- First air date: November 1999
- Last air date: May 6, 2022
- Former call signs: XHTC-TV; XHRAE-TV (1999–2009); XHTRES-TV (2009–2015)
- Former channel numbers: Analog: 28 (UHF, 1999–2015); Virtual: 27 (until 2016), 28 (2016–2020)
- Former affiliations: cadenatres (2006–2015); Excélsior TV (2015–2020)
- Call sign meaning: Cadenatres

Technical information
- ERP: 71.4 kW

Links
- Website: Heraldo Televisión

XHTRES-TDT (channel 10) was a television station in Mexico City. From 2006 to 2015, it was the flagship station of the now defunct network cadenatres and from 2013 to 2020, it was the flagship of the Excélsior TV news network. It was licensed to Compañía Internacional de Radio y Televisión, S.A. (CIRT), which is owned by Grupo Empresarial Ángeles (GEA), a company headed by Olegario Vázquez Raña and directed by Olegario Vázquez Aldir, through its Grupo Imagen communications unit.

XHTRES programming, from February 1, 2020, to May 6, 2022, was the Heraldo Televisión news network.

== History ==
=== An unbuilt station ===
On November 21, 1964, the office of the Secretary of Communications and Transportation (SCT) granted a 25-year concession to CIRT (unrelated to the Cámara Nacional de la Industria de Radio y Televisión, the Mexican broadcasters' association, which is also abbreviated CIRT) and to its controlling shareholder, Roberto Nájera Martínez, for a television station UHF channel 16, to be designated XHTC-TV. As of July 1989, the station had not been built, mainly due to lack of funds, and Nájera transferred his shares to Raúl Aréchiga Espinoza, with the intent that Aréchiga would "manage the bond and/or funding for the installation and operation of the channel." Aréchiga, from Baja California Sur, had interests in radio and a concession to operate a cable TV system in Baja California Sur, and was also owner of the airline Aero California; from 1994 to 1996, he would become director of the Cámara Nacional de la Industria de Radio y Televisión (CIRT), Mexico's association of broadcasters. Although the station was still not on air, in 1989, the SCT granted a ten-year renewal at the end of the initial concession period. With this renewal of the concession, the station was moved from channel 16 to 28 due to a reallocation of television spectrum; it also took on the callsign XHRAE-TV, giving it his initials.

=== XHRAE on the air: the legal battle begins ===
The concession renewal was scheduled to expire on November 21, 1999, and as the date approached, the station had not yet begun transmitting. Needing to go on the air to avoid having the concession reclaimed, Aréchiga hastily put together a schedule of music videos and put XHRAE on the air in November 1999, sparking a five-year controversy. Roberto Nájera Martínez, who had transferred his shares ten years earlier, claimed that he had merely rented the award of the concession to Aréchiga. Nájera insisted that he was the rightful owner of the station and accused Aréchiga of plundering it. Further adding to the station's troubles, Carlos Ruiz Sacristán, the head of the SCT, claimed that Aréchiga failed to live up to the terms of the original concession, refused to endorse a renewal, and instead, sought to revoke the concession. Aréchiga sued, and in a September 2002, letter to Mexican president Vicente Fox, accused current and former members of the SCT of plundering the station. Meanwhile, the SCT became embroiled in a conflict between TV Azteca and CNI involving XHTVM-TV channel 40, and had considered plans to reclaim and reassign channel 28 to help settle the dispute. Bidders began to size up both channels 28 and 40, such as General Electric Mexico.

Finally, in January 2005, a judge ruled that Aréchiga did not violate the terms of the concession, and ordered the SCT to endorse the renewal immediately. The renewal was granted on April 26, 2005, retroactive to November 22, 1999, but only lasting through May 22, 2006. Even before the renewal had been granted, rumors began to flow that Aréchiga's victory was intentional, in order to clear the station for sale, either to Ricardo Salinas Pliego, owner of TV Azteca, who had lost control of channel 40 in the dispute with CNI, or to Olegario Vazquez Raña, a newcomer to the broadcast industry but an associate of Marta Sahagún de Fox, wife of President Vicente Fox. Aréchiga, however, showed a determination to operate the station himself. In December 2005, the station relaunched with a new logo and slogan, "Canal para todos", or "Channel for all". In early 2006, XHRAE-TV signed deals with the Lumiere cinema chain to provide old Mexican movies, and with Productora y Comercializadora de Televisión, SA de CV (PCTV), to provide other programming, which began airing in April.

=== The Cadena Tres era ===
Things quickly deteriorated for Aréchiga, beginning in April 2006. On April 2, the SCT, which at the time not only oversaw broadcasting but also aviation, declared Aréchiga's airline, Aero California, unfit to fly and grounded the entire fleet of airplanes. With his time, money and attention fully devoted to saving Aero California, and with the concession of XHRAE-TV coming up for renewal at the end of May 2006, Aréchiga could not run both enterprises and was forced to seek a buyer for the television station. Some considered the grounding of Aero California as a reprisal for Aréchiga's victory in retaining the channel 28 concession.

The concession for XHRAE-TV was renewed on May 9, 2006, for fifteen years, eliminating a major barrier to the sale of the station. General Electric also attempted to buy the station and provide Aréchiga financing for the airline. A purchase agreement was reached on July 13 and announced on July 18. Administradora Arcángel, S.A. de C.V., part of Grupo Empresarial Ángeles, became the new owners of channel 28. The purchase was approved by Cofeco (the Federal Competition Commission) on August 24, but at the same time, GEA was fined $221,108 pesos for late notification of the purchase. Originally, the purchase price was thought to be $80 million, but turned out to actually be $126 million.

On May 28, 2007, GEA relaunched XHRAE-TV under the name Cadena Tres (lit. Network Three), creating new programs and newscasts with a general audience focus. The station's coverage expanded from Mexico City to the entire Mexican republic through various cable television systems and a handful of local affiliate stations, particularly in border cities.

By September 30, 2009, the station had changed its call sign to XHTRES-TV, reflecting its network identity.

Cadena Tres aimed to become the third major private network in Mexico (hence the name), but struggled to stay alive and expand, allegedly because of the so-called "duopoly" of Televisa and TV Azteca and laws that prevented the network to easily expand (namely, the Federal Telecommunications Act better known as the Televisa Law). Their dream of a nationwide network finally materialized thanks to the new Federal Telecommunications Act of 2013 that ordered the creation of two nationwide independent television networks, one of which was granted to Cadena Tres I, S.A. de C.V., on March 11, 2015. The concession included a transmitter in Mexico City. XHTRES was to become the flagship station of the new network. However, in a move that took audiences by storm, Grupo Imagen decided to take Cadena Tres off the air on October 26, 2015, and replace it with Excélsior TV. According to a message that replaced the front page of the now-defunct network website, the decision was taken in order to put all the efforts of Grupo Imagen into the new network, which launched on October 17, 2016, as Imagen Televisión.

=== Excélsior TV ===
Excélsior TV, which began broadcasting on XHTRES's second subchannel, was originally launched on September 2, 2013, as an offshoot of the Grupo Imagen-owned newspaper Excélsior. It was mainly a 24-hour news channel, focusing mostly on national news. It also features other programs ranging from political debate to show business. After it replaced the signal of Cadena Tres on the 27.1 subchannel, it also broadcast paid programming (infomercials and TV ministries). On December 17, 2015, XHTRES and other television stations in Mexico City shut off their analog signals.

From 2013 to 2018, XHTRES's 27.3 subchannel, changed to 27.2 when Excélsior TV moved up to 27.1 and then to 28.2 when the station's major virtual channel changed in 2016, carried a simulcast of Imagen Radio programming, including video for some programs. This subchannel was ended in February 2018 because Grupo Imagen could not resolve conflicts between assigned electoral advertising schedules for the radio station and the TV subchannel.

=== Heraldo Televisión ===
In late January 2020, rumors began to swirl that Excélsior TV would be shuttered and that XHTRES would be rented out to El Heraldo de México newspaper to launch a TV channel. (The year before, Imagen had sold the newspaper two radio stations to launch a radio network.) On February 1, 2020, this agreement was confirmed, and Heraldo Televisión launched on February 10. At the same time, XHTRES moved to virtual channel 10. Outside of Mexico City, where Excélsior TV was a subchannel of Imagen Televisión transmitters, the channel was replaced with "Imagen Multicast", primarily featuring simulcasts of radio programming.
