= Olegario =

- Gender: Male

Origin
- Origin: Germanic

Other names
- See also: Oleguer, Olegarius

Olegario or Olegário is a masculine given name of Germanic origin, derived from 'Olegarius'. It is most widely used in Spanish- and Portuguese-speaking countries.

Notable people with this name include:

- Olegário Mariano (1889–1958), Brazilian poet, politician, and diplomat
- Olegario Víctor Andrade (1839–1882), Argentine journalist, poet, and politician
- Olegário Benquerença (born 1969), Portuguese football referee
- Olegario Carrillo Meza, Mexican politician
- Olegario Clarin (1892–unknown), Filipino politician
- Olegario Farrés (1934–2022), Paraguayan sports shooter
- Olegario González de Cardedal (born 1934), Spanish Catholic theologian and writer
- Olegario Lazo Baeza (1878–1964), Chilean military officer and writer
- Olegario Molina (1843–1925), Mexican lawyer, businessman, and politician
- Olegario Pachón Núñez (1907–1996), Extremaduran anarchist
- Olegário Tolóí de Oliveira (1939–2024), birth name of Brazilian footballer Dudu
- Olegario Vázquez Raña (1935–2025), Mexican sport shooter and businessman
  - Olegario Vázquez Aldir (born 1972), Mexican businessman, son of the above

== Surname ==
- Boavida Olegario (born 1984), East Timorese footballer

== Other uses ==
- Estadio Municipal Doctor Olegario Henríquez Escalante, stadium in Chile
- Olegario Rivera Public Library, library in Colombia
- Olegario Víctor Andrade, Misiones, village and municipality in Argentina
- Presidente Olegário, municipality in Brazil

== Gallery ==
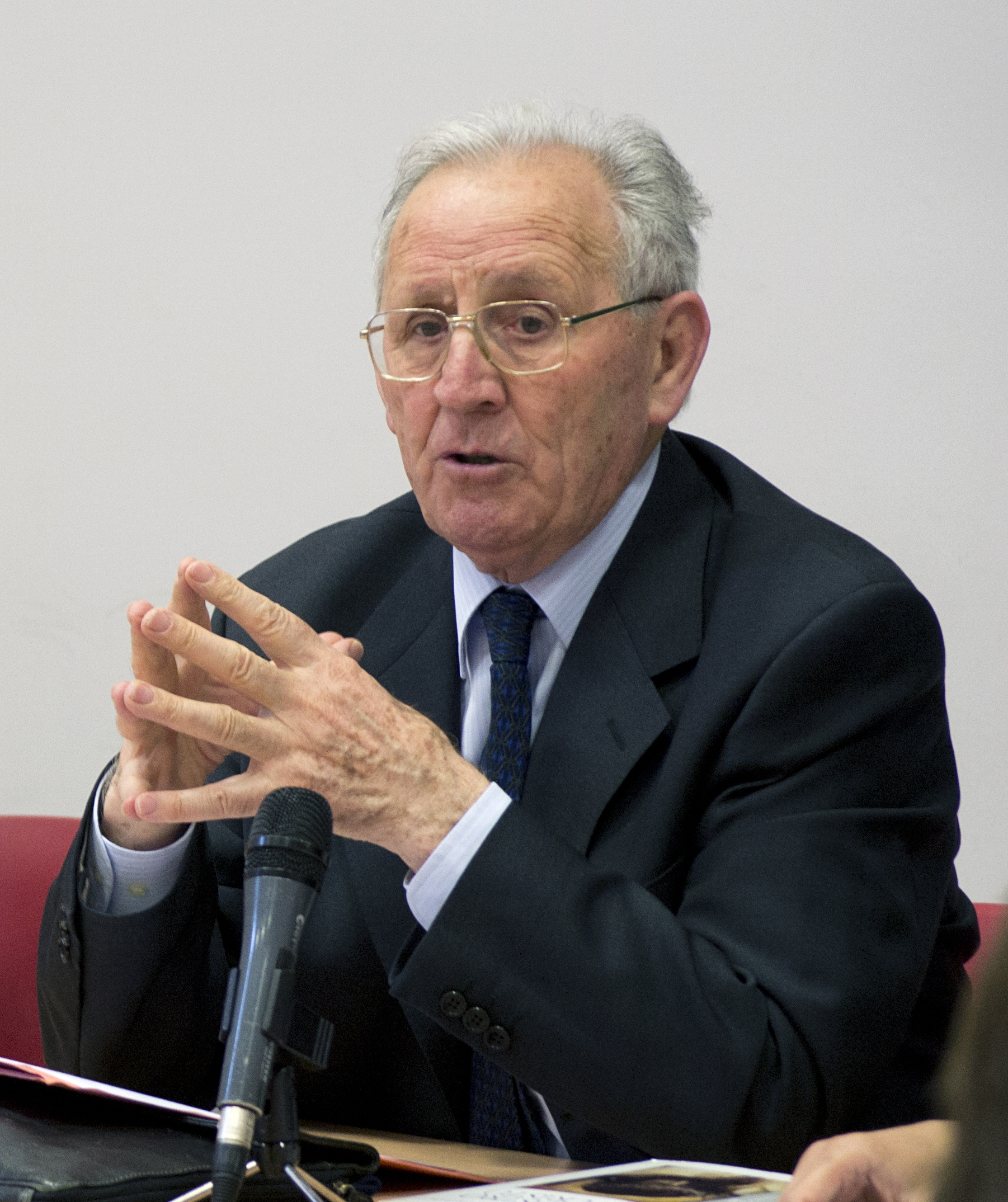
Olegario González de Cardedal

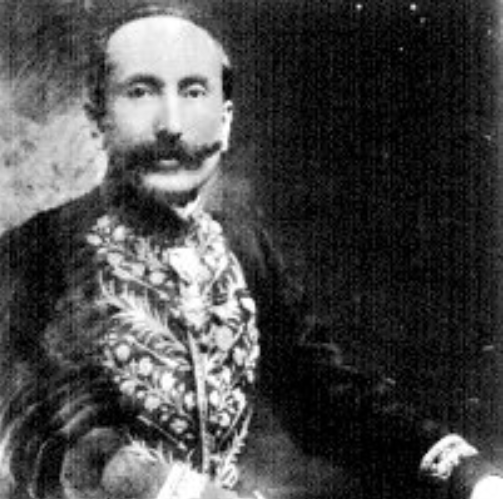
Olegario Molina

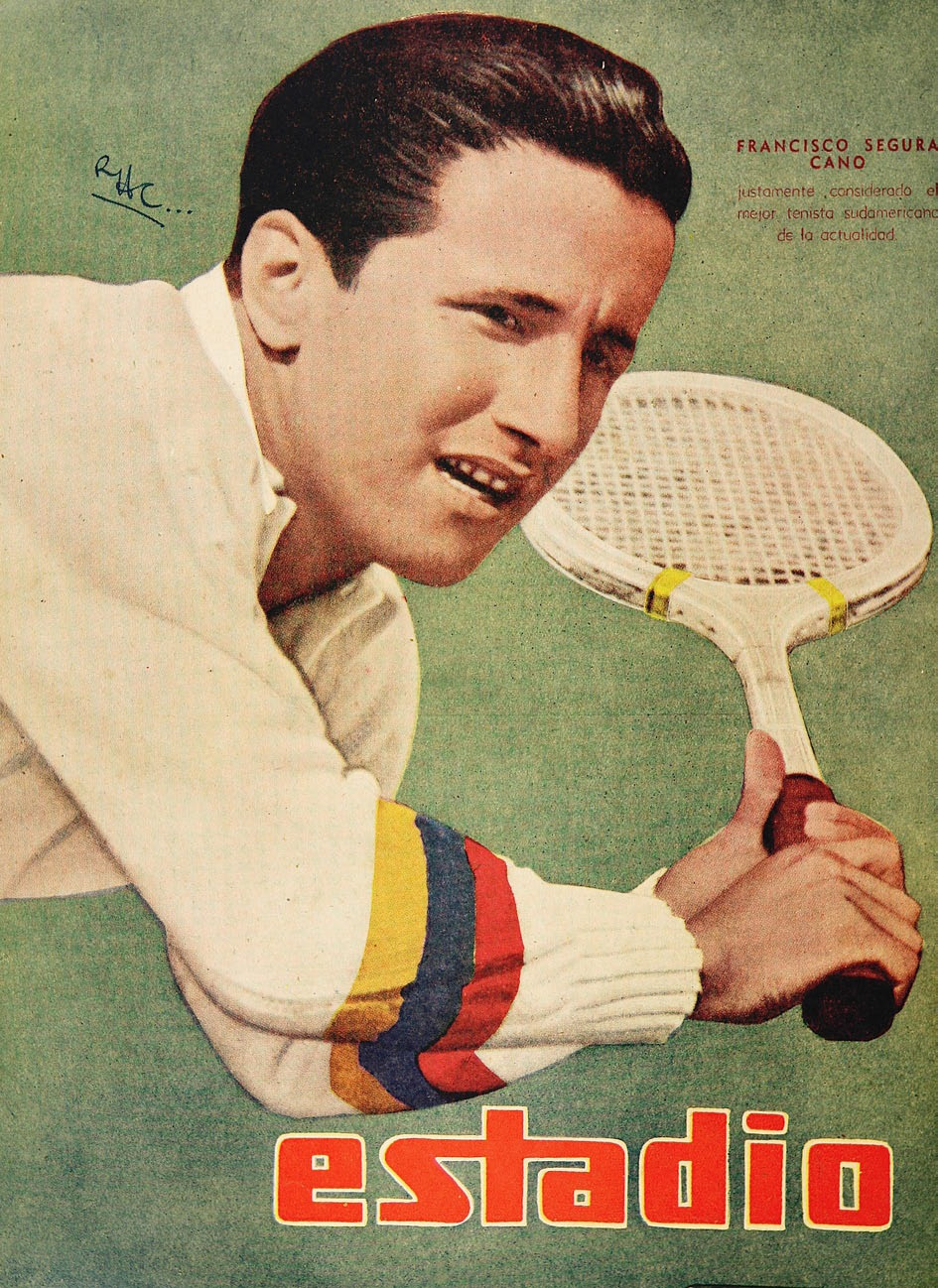
Francisco Olegario Segura Cano

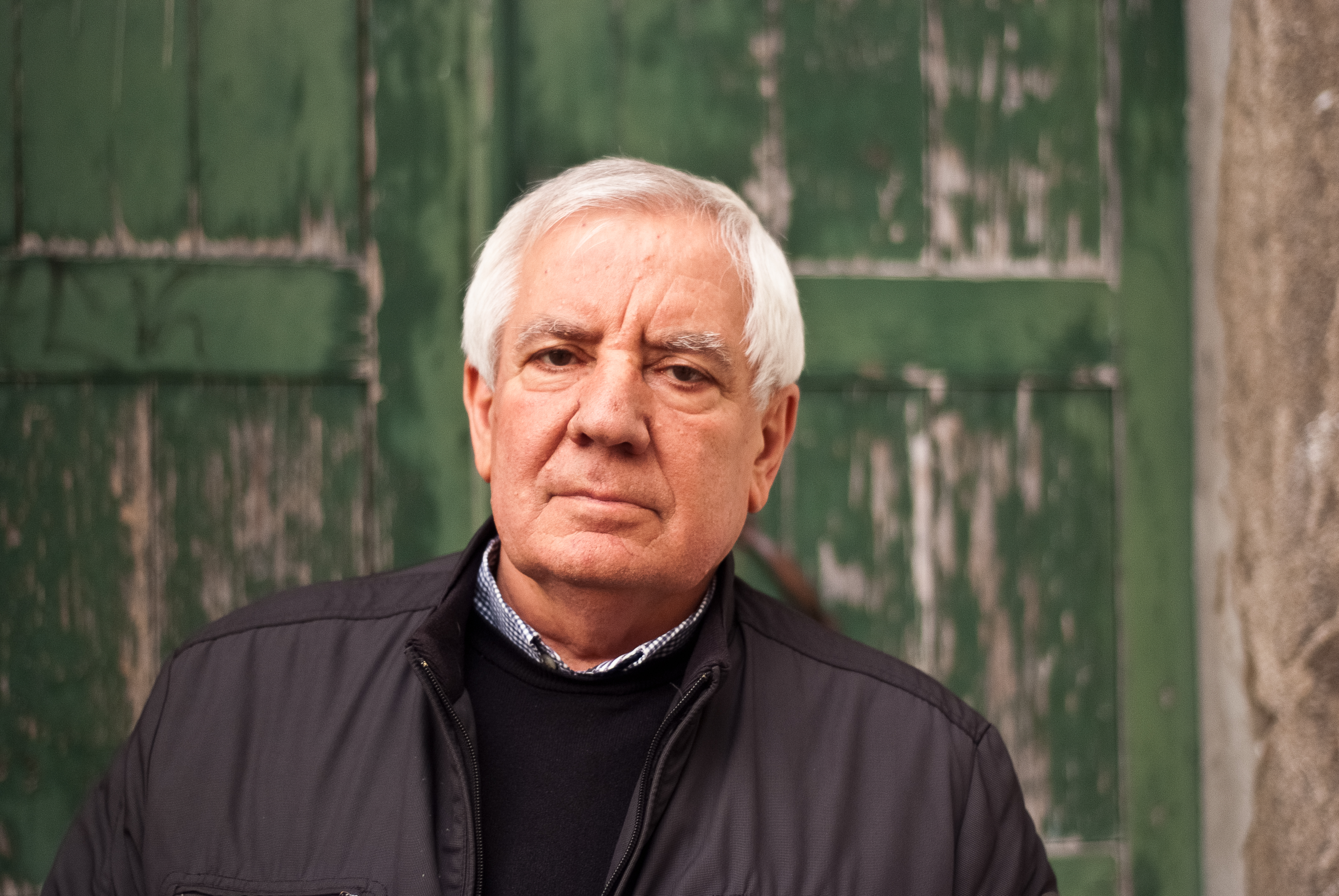
Olegario Sotelo Blanco

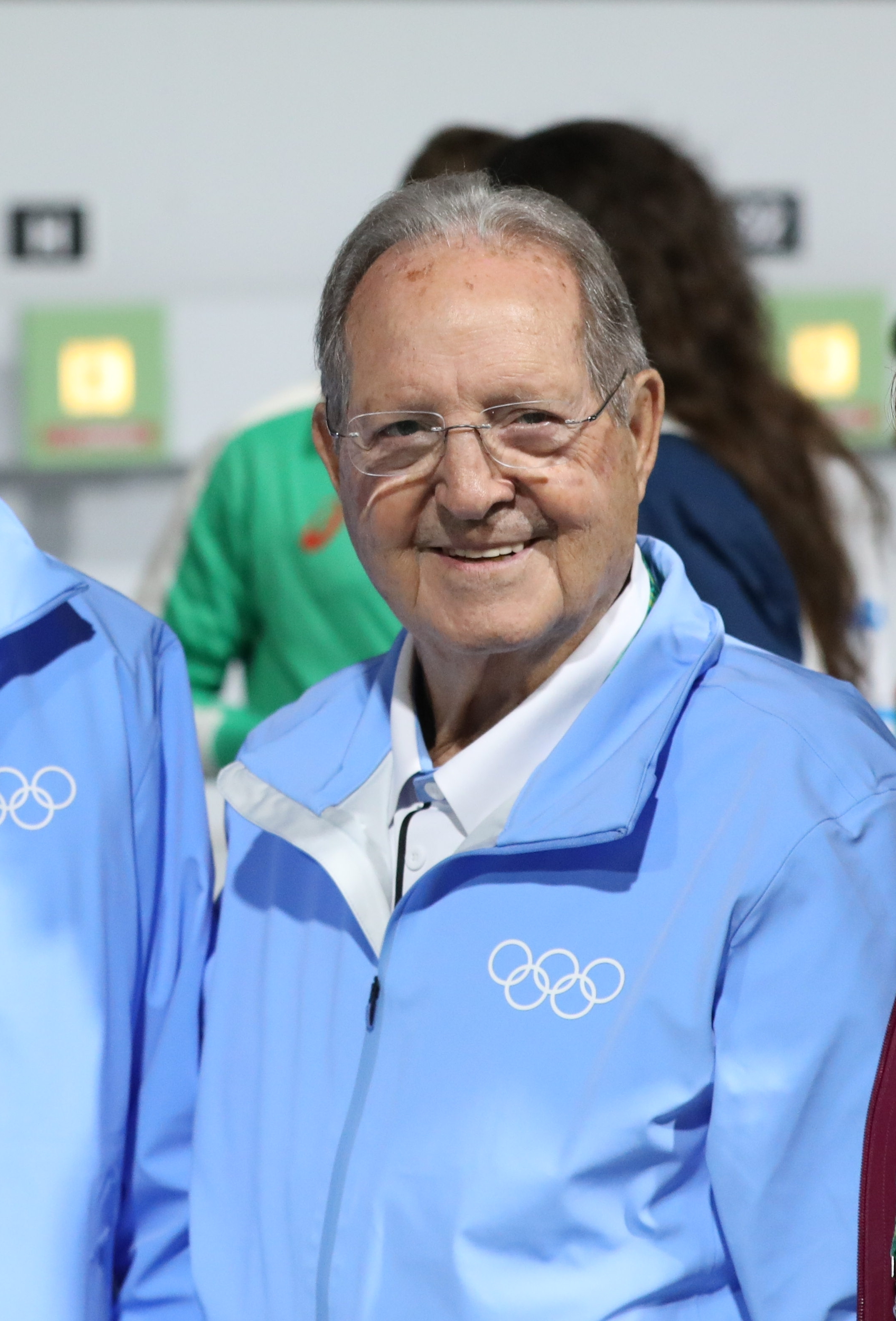
Olegario Vázquez Raña
