= Pedro Ferriz de Con =

Mexican radio and television news anchor

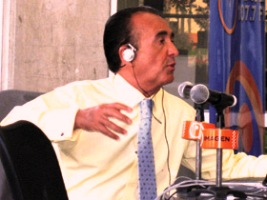
- Ferriz de Con in 2007
- Born: December 12, 1950 (age 74); Mexico City, Mexico
- Occupation: Journalist
- Spouse: Dore Ferriz (née Hijar)
- Children: 3
- Father: Pedro Ferríz Santacruz

Pedro Ferriz de Con (born December 12, 1950) is a Mexican radio and TV news anchor. During the 1990s, he worked for the Multivision Network. In January 2000, he left MVS and went to Grupo Imagen, where he hosted the morning newscast on XEDA-FM until August 25, 2014. He also hosted the evening newscast of Cadenatres from 2007 to 2012.

He currently hosts a morning radio newscast named "Central FM".

On January 15, 2016, he announced his independent bid to run for president in 2018 in Mexico via his Facebook Page.

Ferríz de Con is a Civil Engineer from the Universidad Iberoamericana in México City and has a Master's Degree in applied mathematics from Fleming College at Lugano, Switzerland. His father, was Pedro Ferríz Santacruz (1921-2013), who also was a radio announcer and politician.
