= XHOLA-FM =

Radio station in Puebla, Puebla, Mexico

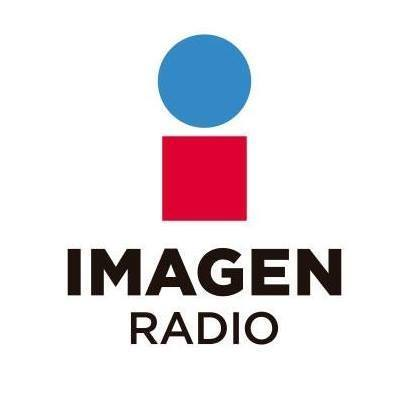

Puebla, Puebla; Mexico
- Frequency: 105.1 MHz
- Branding: Imagen Radio

Programming
- Format: News/talk

Ownership
- Owner: Grupo Imagen; (GIM Televisión Nacional, S.A. de C.V.)

History
- First air date: June 1, 1992 (concession)
- Call sign meaning: "Ola" (wave)

Technical information
- ERP: 15.51 kW

Links
- Website: www.imagenpuebla.mx

XHOLA-FM is a radio station broadcasting on 105.1 FM in Puebla, Puebla, Mexico. It is owned by Grupo Imagen and carries programming from the Imagen Radio news/talk network.

== History ==
XHOLA's first concession was granted on June 1, 1992, to Mastretta Guzmán Comunicación, S.A. de C.V. The company was related to the Mastretta car company, and the station was originally known as "La Radiante 105.1". Imagen acquired the station in 2004.
