= Pedro Ferriz Santa Cruz =

Mexican radio and television presenter

- Born: March 17, 1921; Mexico City, Mexico
- Died: September 3, 2013 (aged 92); Houston, Texas, U.S.
- Education: UNAM
- Occupation: Journalist
- Known for: Radio and television presenter in Mexico.
- Children: Pedro Ferriz de Con
- Parent(s): Pedro Ferriz Monroy; Josefina Ferriz (née Santacruz)

Pedro Ferriz Santa Cruz (March 17, 1921 – September 3, 2013) was a veteran radio and television presenter in Mexico.

His long career includes programs such as Noticiario Nescafe, Las trece del trece and La Pregunta de los 64,000 Pesos (The $64,000 Question). One of his best-known programs is Un mundo nos vigila (A world is watching us), a radio show about the search for intelligent extraterrestrial life, which started on station XEW and was later broadcast on the Imagen Radio network until his death.

Ferriz Santacruz was a candidate for the Party of the Cardenist Front of National Reconstruction (PC) as a senator in 1991 and in 1997, the party's last election, for Head of Government of Mexico City.

Pedro Ferriz Santacruz was the son of Pedro Ferriz Monroy, a railroader, and Josefina Santacruz, a school teacher, also was the father of radio and television news announcer Pedro Ferríz de Con and grandfather of announcer Pedro Ferriz Hijar.
