= XHHLL-FM (Sonora) =

Radio station in Hermosillo, Sonora

- Hermosillo, Sonora; Mexico
- Frequency: 90.7 FM (HD Radio)
- Branding: La Kaliente

Programming
- Format: Grupera
- Subchannels: HD2: Imagen Radio

Ownership
- Owner: Grupo Imagen; (GIM Televisión Nacional, S.A. de C.V.)

History
- First air date: December 21, 1990
- Call sign meaning: "Hermosillo"

Technical information
- Licensing authority: CRT
- Class: B
- ERP: 15,000 watts
- HAAT: 283.7 m (931 ft)
- Transmitter coordinates: 29°07′49.2″N 110°56′11.2″W

Links
- Website: www.lakaliente.com.mx

XHHLL-FM is a radio station in Hermosillo, Sonora, Mexico. Broadcasting on 90.7 FM, XHHLL is owned by Grupo Imagen and carries a grupera format known as La Kaliente.

== History ==
XHHLL received its concession on December 11, 1990, and signed on December 21. It was owned by Radio S.A. subsidiary Radio Alma, S.A.; the group launched “Energía Digital”, an adult contemporary format. On September 13, 1993, the station flipped to grupera as "La Kaliente 90.7", a format it maintains to this day. XHHLL was sold to Grupo Imagen in 2006.

The station was authorized in March 2019 to operate in HD Radio and in August 2019 to add Imagen Radio programming as its HD2 subchannel.
