= KTTK =

KTTK may refer to:

- The Keys to the Kingdom
- KTTK (FM), a radio station (90.7 FM) licensed to Lebanon, Missouri, United States
