= Excélsior =

Mexico City daily newspaper

Excelsior
- Spanish: El periódico de la vida nacional (The newspaper of the national life)

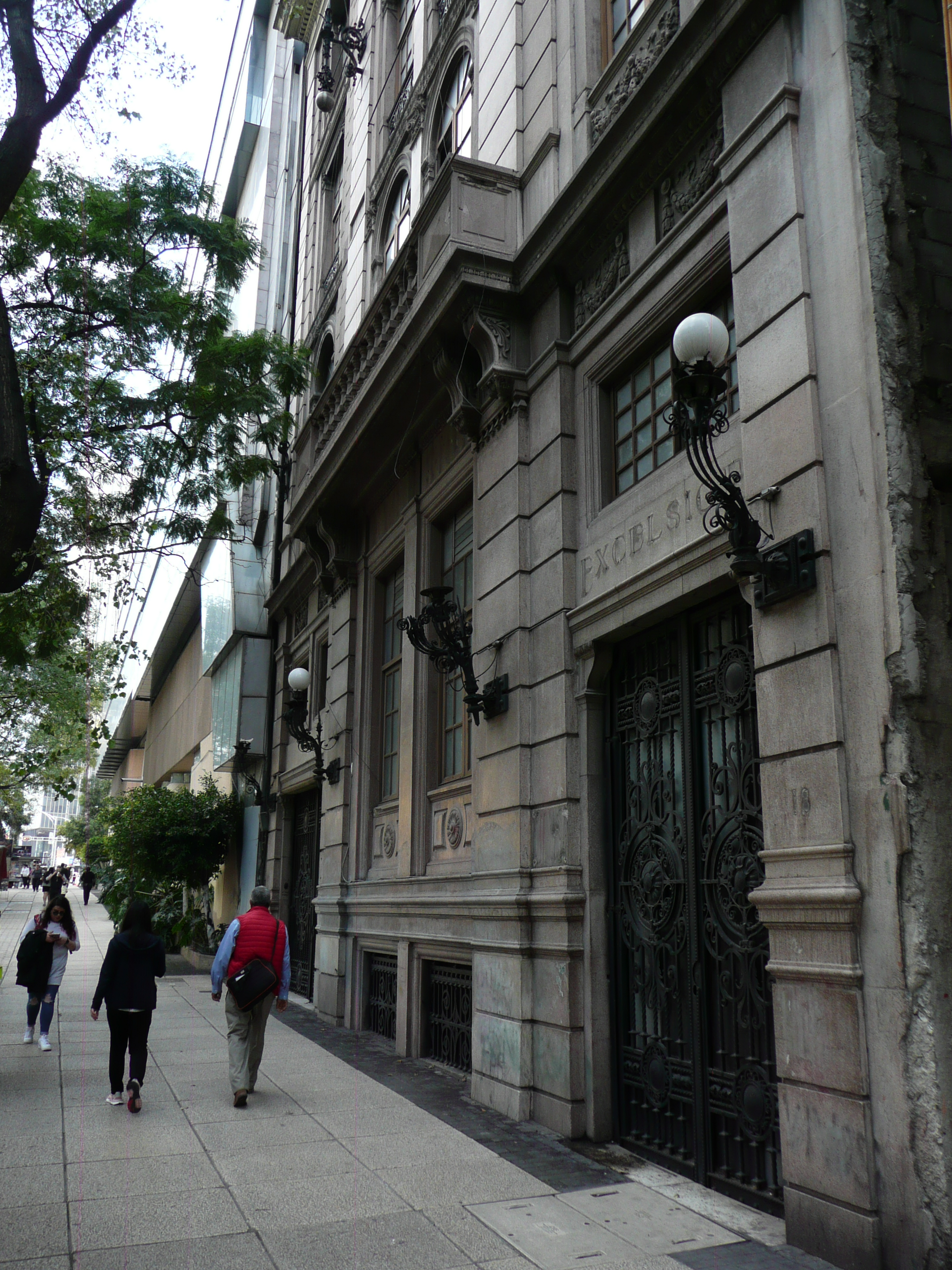
- View of the façade of Excélsior's headquarters, focusing on the historic building, at Paseo de la Reforma 18.
- Type: Daily newspaper
- Format: Broadsheet
- Owner: Grupo Imagen (Grupo Vazol)
- Founded: March 18, 1917; 109 years ago
- Language: Spanish
- Headquarters: Mexico City, Mexico
- ISSN: 1563-7425
- OCLC number: 32103214
- Website: www.excelsior.com.mx

Excélsior is a daily newspaper in Mexico City. It is the second-oldest paper in the city after El Universal, printing its first issue on March 18, 1917.

The newspaper's headquarters were formerly located at Avenida Bucareli 1 in Colonia Juárez, Mexico City, at the intersection between that avenue and Paseo de la Reforma, which is known as Esquina de la Información (the "Information Corner" or "News Corner" in Spanish), since the headquarters of El Universal are also within this area. The first historic building of its headquarters is located between Paseo de la Reforma 18 and Avenida Bucareli 17, next to the modern building.

== History ==
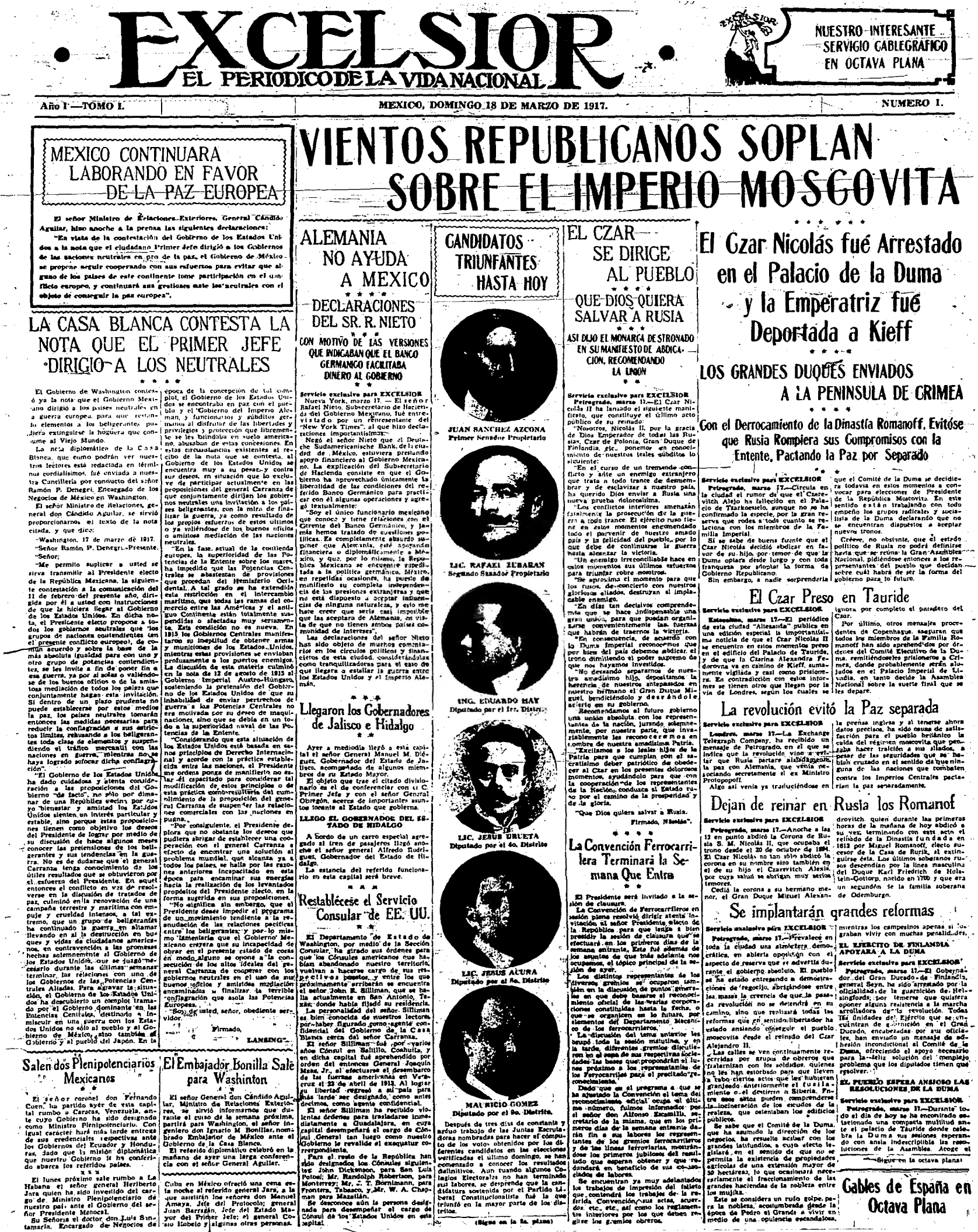
Front page of the first published issue of Excélsior, from March 18, 1917.

Originating from the weekly journal Revista de revistas, Excélsior was founded by Rafael Alducin and first published in Mexico City on March 18, 1917. Before choosing its current location, the headquarters were initially set at the corner between the streets of Colón and Rosales (this corner no longer exists, it was located around the area where the Torre del Caballito is today), and then they moved to Nuevo México street (today known as Artículo 123 street). All of these locations are within Cuauhtémoc borough, near the historic center of Mexico City.

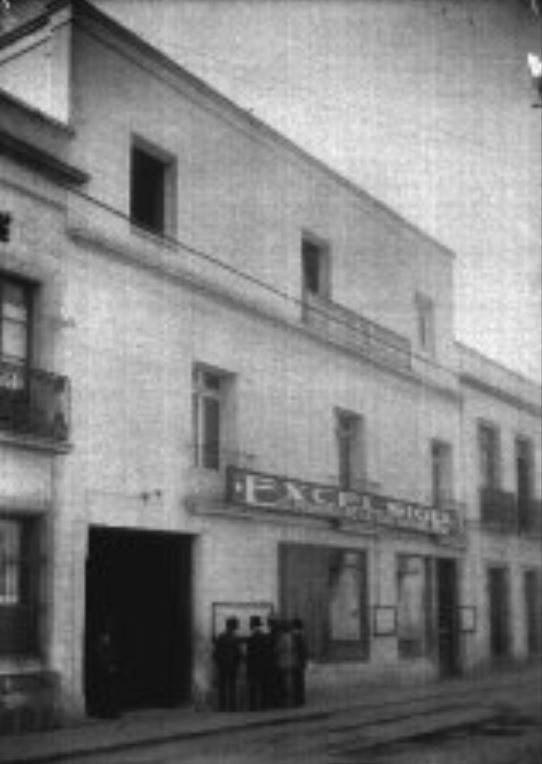
Old Excélsior headquarters at Nuevo México street.

The historic building of its current headquarters began construction in 1922 and concluded in December 1924. The building was designed, at the behest of Alducin, by Italian architect Silvio Contri, the construction was directed by Carlos Borgatt, and engineers Miguel Rebolledo and Manuel Marroquín y Rivera would also participate. The building has two distinct looking façades facing each avenue (Reforma and Bucareli), despite that both belong to a single building.

In April 1924, Alducin died at the age of 35, and his family led the newspaper into difficult times. Ultimately, it was reconstituted as a worker-owned cooperative in 1932, with one-time accountant Gilberto Figueroa named general manager. His ability to manage finances and broker compromise within the newspaper contributed to a successful 30-year reign, in which the newspaper would become politically and economically stable.

Beginning in 1968, the newspaper's editorial stance was of a relatively liberal bent, under the editorship of Julio Scherer García. After Scherer left the newspaper in 1976, the editorial stance became more overtly supportive of the Institutional Revolutionary Party (PRI) and the Mexican establishment in general, in a move spurred when President Luis Echeverría secretly incited a group of workers to take over the cooperative and install new leadership. The "Excélsior coup" instituted the new leadership that would be at the head of Excélsior until 2001. The outgoing editorial staff went on to found new publications, like Proceso, Vuelta and Unomásuno.

In 2001, Regino Díaz Redondo, who had led the paper since 1976, was ousted, leaving in his wake a disorganized cooperative and an indebted newspaper. The end of the PRI's hold on Mexican politics brought with it a falling out of favor for the publication.

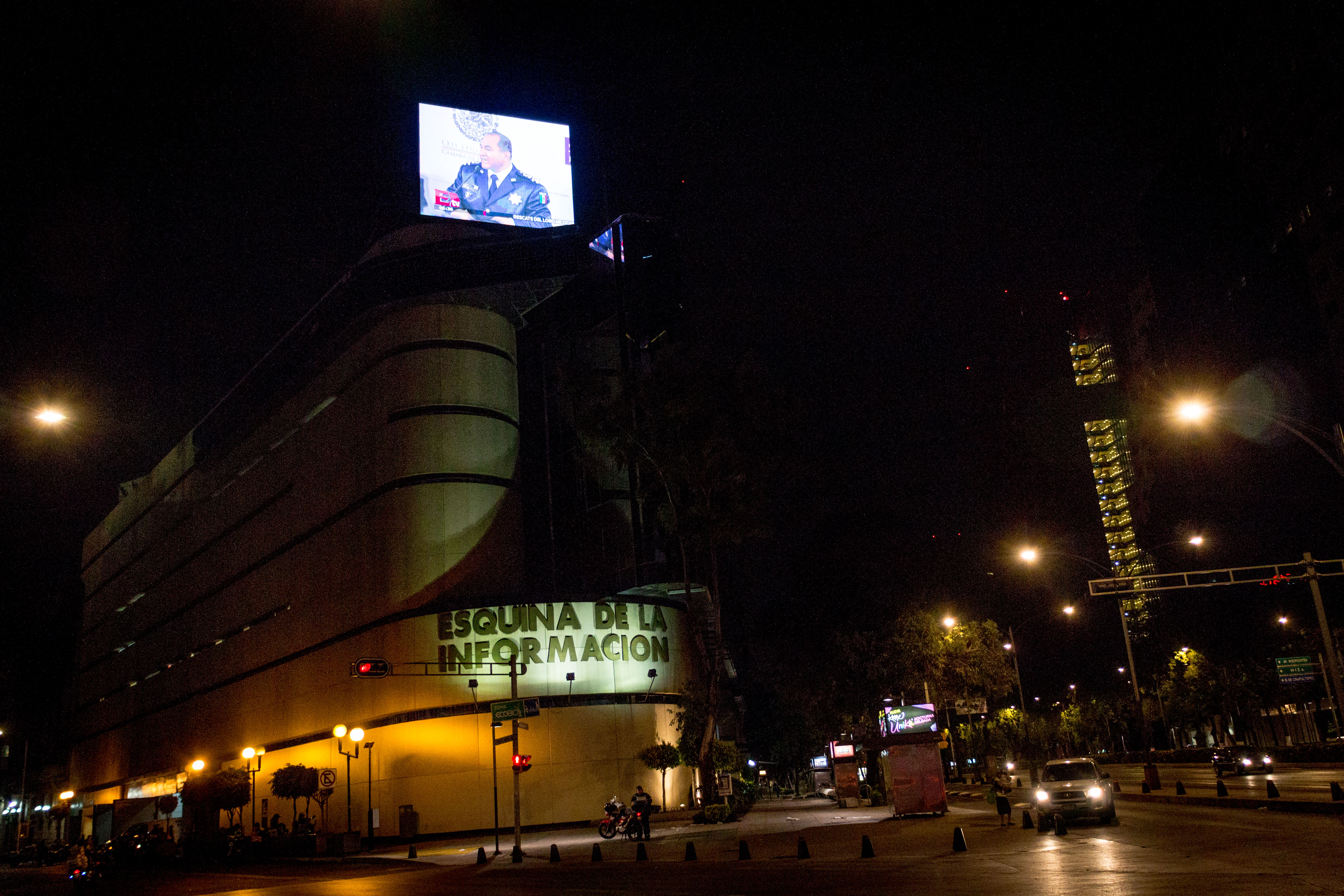
The Excélsior building seen from the Esquina de la Información at night, in 2015.

In January 2006, the newspaper was sold to Grupo Imagen, the owners of radio and TV interests in Mexico City, headed by Olegario Vázquez Raña. The cooperative voted 591–7 to authorize the sale of Excélsior. The sale led to the dissolution of the cooperative and the relaunch of the newspaper on March 18, 2006. The publication of its weekly journal Revista de revistas ended. Its main writers also contribute to Imagen radio and Cadena Tres; Excélsior TV, a cable news channel also available over the air in Mexico City, launched in September 2013.

== See also ==
- Communications in Mexico
- List of newspapers in Mexico
