= XHFL-FM (Guanajuato) =

Radio station in Guanajuato City, Guanajuato

XHFL-FM / XEFL-AM
- Guanajuato City, Guanajuato; Mexico
- Frequencies: 90.7 FM; 1500 AM
- Branding: Radio Santa Fe

Programming
- Format: Talk radio
- Affiliations: Imagen Informativa

Ownership
- Owner: Radio Ventas de Provincia; (Radio Santa Fe de Guanajuato, S.A.)

History
- First air date: September 21, 1971

Technical information
- Class: B (AM); B1 (FM)
- Power: 5 kW day.08 kW night
- ERP: 10,000 watts (FM)
- HAAT: 96 meters (315 ft) (FM)
- Transmitter coordinates: 21°02′18.77″N 101°16′25.78″W

Links
- Webcast: Listen live
- Website: radiosantafe.mx

XHFL-FM/XEFL-AM is a radio station in Guanajuato City, Guanajuato, Mexico. Broadcasting on 90.7 FM and 1500 AM from Cerro Aldana, XHFL is known as Radio Santa Fe with a talk radio format. 1500 AM is a United States clear-channel frequency.

== History ==
The concession for XEFL-AM was awarded to José Horacio Septien Echagaray in 1971. The FM counterpart was obtained in 1994.

In 2015, the station received approval to begin nighttime operation on 1500 at 80 watts. The station had been a daytimer for 44 years.
