= Gonzalo Castellot Madrazo =

Mexican broadcaster and politician

Deputy of the Congress of the Union for the 37th district of the Federal District
- In office 1 September 1985 – 31 August 1988
- Preceded by: Alfonso Valdivía Ruvalcaba
- Succeeded by: Miguel Aroche Parra

Deputy of the Congress of the Union for the 9th district of the Federal District
- In office 1 September 1979 – 31 August 1982
- Preceded by: Venustiano Reyes López
- Succeeded by: Guillermo Dávila Martínez

Deputy of the Congress of the Union for the 17th district of the Federal District
- In office 1 September 1961 – 31 August 1964
- Preceded by: Gonzálo Peña Manterola
- Succeeded by: Abel Carlos Vicencio Tovar

Personal details
- Born: February 20, 1922 Campeche, Campeche, or Mexico City
- Died: August 6, 2011 (aged 89) Colima, Colima
- Party: Institutional Revolutionary Party
- Occupation: Politician and broadcaster

Gonzalo Castellot Madrazo (February 20, 1922 – August 6, 2011) was a Mexican broadcaster, station owner and politician. He served three times in the Chamber of Deputies and was particularly involved in the development of broadcasting in the state of Colima.

== Life ==
Castellot Madrazo was born to José Castellot Paullada and Ernestina Madrazo Torres on February 20, 1922, either in Campeche, Campeche, or in Mexico City. He went to elementary and secondary school in Mexico City and then attended the National Autonomous University of Mexico (UNAM), where he earned his legal degree. In 1944, Castellot obtained his announcer's license; he then worked briefly at Cadena Radio Continental and at XEKJ in Acapulco, Guerrero.

In 1947, Castellot and Alonso Sordo Noriega unionized the workers at XEX, a then-new radio station in the nation's capital. Three years later, on July 26, 1950, he had the distinction of being the first announcer to be seen on Mexican television, on the first day of operations of XHTV, the country's first TV station. He read news headlines as part of XHTV's first day of programming.

Castellot also was involved in the creation of new representative organizations for announcers and employees in broadcasting. In 1951, he founded the National Announcers' Association (Asociación Nacional de Locutores), as well as TV Servicio Modelos, the first modeling agency of its kind in the country. Eight years later, he became the secretary general of SITAT, the Industrial Union of Television Artists and Workers, now known as SITATYR. He remained the head of the union for 37 years.

=== In politics ===
Castellot Madrazo represented the Federal District three times in the Chamber of Deputies: from 1961 to 1964 (17th district), from 1979 to 1982 (9th district) and again from 1985 to 1988 (37th district). His involvement with the Institutional Revolutionary Party (PRI) extended beyond serving in the legislature, as he headed the radio, television and film office of the presidential press office during the term of Gustavo Díaz Ordaz and worked on the campaigns of Díaz Órdaz and his predecessor, Adolfo López Mateos.

=== Colima ===
In the 1980s, Castellot moved to the state of Colima, where he contributed to the development of media in the state. In January 1980, Castellot and José de Jesús Partida Villanueva launched a new Televisa station, XHCC-TV channel 5. In November 1984, XHCC began offering regular local programs.

In 1993, Castellot brought the first FM station to the city of Colima when XHCC-FM "Volcán FM" was launched; the station was sold to Grupo Imagen in 2006. Also in the 1990s, he began serving on various organizations relating to broadcasting, including as president of Promosat de México, from 1997 until his death. He also was the president of the state chapter of the National Radio and Television Chamber (CIRT) in 2004.

Castellot was recognized by major broadcasting organizations for his lengthy career. In 2000, he was presented with the Golden Microphone Award by the National Announcers' Association and with the Premio Antena, awarded by the CIRT. In 2010, the Mayor of Colima, José Ignacio Peralta Sánchez, honored him for his 60 years of service to the industry.

Toward the end of his life, Castellot continued to host the radio programs "Colima Hoy" (Colima Today) and "El Compositor y Su Música" (The Composer and Their Music); he also wrote a book, Mis memorias a casi un siglo de la radio en México ("My Memories of Almost a Century of Radio in Mexico").

Castellot died in Colima on August 6, 2011, of cardiorespiratory failure after a long illness. He was survived by his wife Laura and children and grandchildren.
