= XHHTS-FM =

Radio station in Tapachula, Chiapas

- Tapachula, Chiapas; Mexico
- Frequency: 90.7 FM
- Branding: Extremo

Programming
- Format: Adult contemporary

Ownership
- Owner: Radio Núcleo; (XHHTS-FM Radio, S.A. de C.V.)

History
- First air date: November 16, 1988 (concession)

Technical information
- Class: B1
- ERP: 19 kW
- Transmitter coordinates: 14°55′16″N 92°16′29.4″W

Links
- Webcast: Extremo 90.7 listen online
- Website: tapachula.radionucleo.com/index.php/extremo-907-fm

XHHTS-FM is a radio station on 90.7 FM in Tapachula, Chiapas, Mexico. It is known as Extremo and carries an adult contemporary format.

== History ==
XHHTS received its concession on November 16, 1988. It was owned by Radio Núcleo owner Francisco Siman Estefan.
