= XHALAM-FM =

Radio station in Álamo, Veracruz, Mexico

Álamo, Veracruz; Mexico
- Frequency: 90.7 FM
- Branding: La Voz de la Huasteca

Programming
- Format: Cultural

Ownership
- Owner: El Aprendizaje Es Para Todos, A.C.

History
- First air date: August 1, 2012 (permit)
- Call sign meaning: ALAMo

Technical information
- Class: A
- ERP: 2.9 kW
- HAAT: 76.682 m
- Transmitter coordinates: 20°51′55.38″N 97°37′14.64″W

XHALAM-FM is a noncommercial radio station on 90.7 FM in Álamo, Veracruz, Mexico. It is owned by El Aprendizaje Es Para Todos, A.C., and is part of the Radio Voces de Veracruz network of permit stations in northern Veracruz, operating as La Voz de la Huasteca.

== History ==
XHALAM was permitted on August 1, 2012.
