= XHJRZ-FM =

Radio station in Jerez de García Salinas, Zacatecas

- Jerez, Zacatecas; Mexico
- Frequency: 90.7 FM
- Branding: Inolvidable

Programming
- Format: Oldies/romantic

Ownership
- Owner: Grupo Radiofónico Zer; (Arnoldo Rodríguez Zermeño)

History
- First air date: October 3, 2012
- Call sign meaning: JeReZ

Technical information
- Class: CRT
- Power: A
- ERP: 3 kW
- HAAT: 10.1 m (33 ft)
- Transmitter coordinates: 22°38′36″N 102°57′41″W

Links
- Webcast: Listen live
- Website: grupozer.mx/..

XHJRZ-FM is a noncommercial radio station on 90.7 FM in Jerez, Zacatecas. The station is owned by Grupo Radiofónico Zer and is known as Inolvidable.

== History ==
XHJRZ is one of Grupo ZER's permit stations. It received its permit on October 3, 2012.
