= XHLDC-FM =

Radio station in Magdalena de Kino, Sonora

- Magdalena de Kino, Sonora; Mexico
- Broadcast area: Magdalena de Kino, Sonora
- Frequency: 90.7 FM
- Branding: KY

Programming
- Format: Urban

Ownership
- Owner: Grupo Audiorama Comunicaciones; (Radio XHLDC Sonora, S.A. de C.V.)

History
- First air date: August 16, 1994 (concession)
- Former call signs: XHIMS-FM (1994 to August 1997)
- Call sign meaning: In honor of Luis Donaldo Colosio, a native of Magdalena de Kino

Technical information
- Licensing authority: CRT
- Class: B1
- ERP: 15 kW
- HAAT: −59.3 m (−195 ft)

Links
- Webcast: Listen live
- Website: audiorama.mx

XHLDC-FM is a radio station on 90.7 FM in Magdalena de Kino, Sonora, Mexico. It is operated by Grupo Audiorama Comunicaciones and is known as KY (pronounced like "calle") with an urban format.

== History ==
XHLDC began as XHIMS-FM in Imuris, Sonora, with concession awarded to Radio Comunicación Creativa, S.A. de C.V., on August 16, 1994. The station came to air from Magdalena de Kino and owned by Grupo ACIR in 1997. The callsign changed that August to XHLDC-FM, in honor of assassinated presidential candidate Luis Donaldo Colosio, who was from Magdalena de Kino. The station's original format was grupera La Comadre, though it soon changed names to Stereo Sol, Fiesta Mexicana and finally to the Toño format once Larsa took control.

In the late 2000s, Grupo ACIR sold many radio stations to Radiorama, including XHLDC. Radiorama then transferred operations of many of its stations in the state to Grupo Larsa Comunicaciones in 2011. This station reverted to control of Audiorama (a related company to Radiorama) a decade later, and on October 4, 2021, the station formally relaunched as KY 90.7 using imaging debuted on Audiorama's XHDK-FM Guadalajara in 2020.
