= Cadenatres =

Former Mexican television network

cadenatres
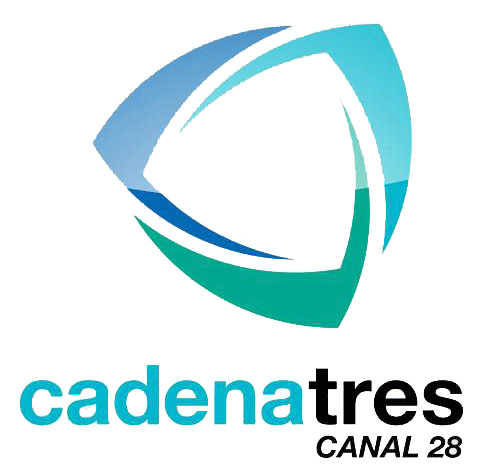
- Type: Terrestrial television network
- Country: Mexico
- Availability: Defunct
- Owner: Grupo Empresarial Ángeles
- Key people: Olegario Vázquez Raña
- Launch date: 28 May 2007
- Dissolved: 26 October 2015
- Official website: www.cadenatres.com.mx
- Replaced by: Imagen Televisión

Cadenatres was a Mexican free-to-air network owned by Grupo Empresarial Ángeles (GEA), a company headed by Olegario Vázquez Raña and directed by Olegario Vázquez Aldir. Originally started by its flagship XHTRES in Mexico City as an independent terrestrial television station serving the Federal District and the Valley of Mexico, it later expanded coverage throughout the entire country through various subscription television systems and a handful of free-to-air affiliates.

Cadenatres was shut down on 26 October 2015, to allow Grupo Imagen, the communications subsidiary of GEA, to focus on building the Imagen Televisión national network, which launched on 17 October 2016.

== History ==
After acquiring the television station XHRAE from Raúl Aréchiga Espinoza on July 18, 2006, GEA relaunched XHRAE-TV under the name CadenaTres (lit. Network Three) on May 28, 2007. Its goal was to become the third major national private-owned network in Mexico (hence the name). In order to achieve said goal, Grupo Imagen (GEA's multimedia branch) created a full commercial schedule for the general audience which included newscasts, films, sports, comedy shows, dramas, telenovelas, political satire, daytime programming and children and teens programming. Throughout its run, several associations with international networks and production companies enriched CadenaTres programming.

The network's coverage expanded from Mexico City to the entire Mexican republic through various cable television systems and its three broadcast affiliates in Baja California, Chihuahua and Sonora. It struggled to become a major network against fierce completion from the "duopoly" of TV Azteca and Televisa and laws that prevented to easily acquire stations throughout the country (namely, the Federal Telecommunications Act better known as the Televisa Law).

By September 30, 2009, its flagship station had changed its call sign to XHTRES-TV from XHRAE, reflecting its network identity.

The goal of becoming "The Third Network" finally materialized for Grupo Imagen, thanks to the 2013 Federal Telecommunications Act that ordered the creation of two nationwide over-the-air digital networks. On March 11, 2015, Grupo Imagen was granted the operation of one of the networks that would carry the CadenaTres signal nationwide over-the-air. However, in a sudden and unexpected decision, Grupo Imagen shut down CadenaTres on October 26, 2015, and replaced its feed in its flagship channel (XHTRES Channel 28) with the Excélsior TV news network. Except for their news anchors and paid programming (infomercials, TV ministries), all of CadenaTres programming suddenly ended its run. Allegedly, about 300 employees lost their jobs with the shutdown.

== Programming ==
=== Newscasts ===
CadenaTres had three daily newscasts, early morning, afternoon and nightly, as well as hourly recaps. The main newscasts were the afternoon (led by Yuriria Sierra) and nightly programs. The nightly newscast had various anchors throughout its run, being the most important Pedro Ferriz de Con, Pablo Hiriart, and toward the end of the channel's life, Francisco Zea. They were famous for their rather aggressive and opinionated editorials by the anchors for nearly every report.

=== Sports ===
Boxing and wrestling were the first major sports programming on CadenaTres (aired on Saturday evenings). After Grupo Imagen acquired Querétaro FC, Liga MX soccer also became part of its sports programming, although it never managed to carry as many games as Televisa or TV Azteca.

=== Telenovelas ===
Thanks to several associations with Latin American networks such as Venevision, Televen, Telemundo and RCN (Colombia), CadenaTres aired several telenovelas and drama series. The last of these series was RCN's El Estilista, which was cut short on October 23, 2015.

On January 20, 2010, Argos and CadenaTres signed and agreement to create new and exclusive content for the network. Shows such as Las Aparicio (2010), El Sexo Débil (2011) and El octavo mandamiento (2011) enjoyed both critical and audience acclaim.

=== Comedy and political satire ===
Arguably, CadenaTres's major success was the political satire show Mikorte Informativo, a newscast parody inspired by The Planet of the Apes that featured three news anchors with a simian appearance that came from the planet Mikón and criticized the news every week, mostly national news (similar to SNL's Weekend Update). It first aired on November 29, 2009.

The success of Mikorte Informativo spun-off the creation of a weekend programming block known as Barra Desinformativa (Misinformation Block) in 2014. It featured two new shows that were very similar to the format of Mikorte: El Incorrecto (hosted by Eduardo Videgaray and José Ramón San Cristóbal, originally aired on E! Latino) and Ya ni llorar es bueno (hosted by stand-up comedian Gon Curiel).

A short-lived venture with production company Adicta Films in 2012 led to the creation of two original sitcoms: El Albergue and La Clínica. These were generally panned by both critics and the audience.

=== International programming ===
An association with Sony Entertainment Television Latin America allowed CadenaTres to acquire shows such as The Shield and CSI: New York and the reality show Latin American Idol around 2010/2011.

Up to its final date, CadenaTres acquired several old American sitcoms to create a Retro programming block. The block featured the shows The Nanny, I Dream of Jeannie, Bewitched, The Munsters, The Addams Family, The Lucy Show and The Beverly Hillbillies.

=== Daytime and entertainment ===
Daytime television was also produced. It featured morning variety-talk shows such as Bien familiar (hosted by Fernanda Familiar in 2008) and Nuestro Día (hosted by Martha Figueroa up to the shutdown of the network in 2015). It also featured the successful cooking show Cocinemos Juntos hosted by Many Muñoz that aired from 2011 to October 23, 2015.

Show business-related shows were led by Gustavo Adolfo Infante. Infante hosted the daily gossip show No lo cuentes and the weekly interview talk show En compañia de....

=== Children's programming ===
CadenaTres originally aired cartoons weekdays around 2:00 to 4:00 p.m. Thanks to their alliance with Sony, vintage shows such as The Real Ghostbusters and Dinosaucers as well as modern shows like Big Guy and Rusty the Boy Robot and Extreme Ghostbusters were part of this block.
Later, as they lost the Sony agreement, the network adopted the old Saturday Morning Cartoons format for its weekend programming. Initially it featured minor modern shows such as Fantastic Four: World's Greatest Heroes and Cosmic Quantum Ray. Later and up to its final date, retro children programming took over with success. Initially it featured anime shows such as Speed Racer, Mazinger Z, Gekko Kamen/Capitán Centella, and Heidi and the Japanese drama series Comet-san (known as Señorita Cometa in Mexico). The latter was dearly remembered by the Mexican audience and it was the first time in over 20 years that this series was broadcast after the loss of the original dubbing in the earthquake of 1985. In its final year and following their retro programming trend, American cartoons He-Man and the Masters of the Universe, She-Ra: Princess of Power, and several Marvel Comics cartoons from the late 70s, 80s and 90s replaced most anime shows, although Señorita Cometa remained until September, 2015.

=== Teen programming ===
CadenaTres aired shows produced by Epic Network aimed at a younger audience. The featured shows were: Gamer#Tag and CTRLGAMER (videogames), Japantastic (Asian pop culture), TechCity (gadgets), LOL TV (social networks) and top diez (music). This programming block was enjoying a growing success up to the network's final date. After the network shutdown, these shows are still being produced and are available on-demand and were picked by former CadenaTres affiliate, Canal 44 of Ciudad Juárez, Chihuahua, Mexico.

== Slogans ==
- 2007-2008: Cadena Tres, La Televisión Abierta. (Cadena Tres, Open Television)
- 2008-2009: Encadenate a Cadena Tres. (Connect to Cadena Tres)
- 2009-2010: Somos Cadena Tres y estamos en el 28 (We are Cadena Tres and we are on 28)
- 2010–2015: La Televisión más abierta que nunca (Television more open than ever)

== Cadenatres affiliates ==
Cadenatres had three informal affiliates in 2014, which broadcast some of its programs:

- XHIJ-TV, Ciudad Juárez, Chihuahua
- XHILA-TV, Mexicali, Baja California
- XHNSS-TV, Nogales, Sonora
