= Fernando Espino Arévalo =

Mexican politician

- Born: 22 February 1949 (age 76); Morelia, Michoacán, Mexico
- Occupation: Politician

Fernando Espino Arévalo (born 22 February 1949) is a Mexican politician. Since 1978, he has worked as the General Secretary of the National Union of Workers of the Mexico City Metro.

In the 1991 mid-terms he was elected to the Chamber of Deputies to represent the 37th district of the Federal District. He returned to Congress in the 2009 mid-terms as a plurinominal deputy.

== External sources ==
- Profile (in Spanish) at the Sistema de Información Legislativa Database
