= Camino Real Hotels =

Mexican Hotel Service

Camino Reales

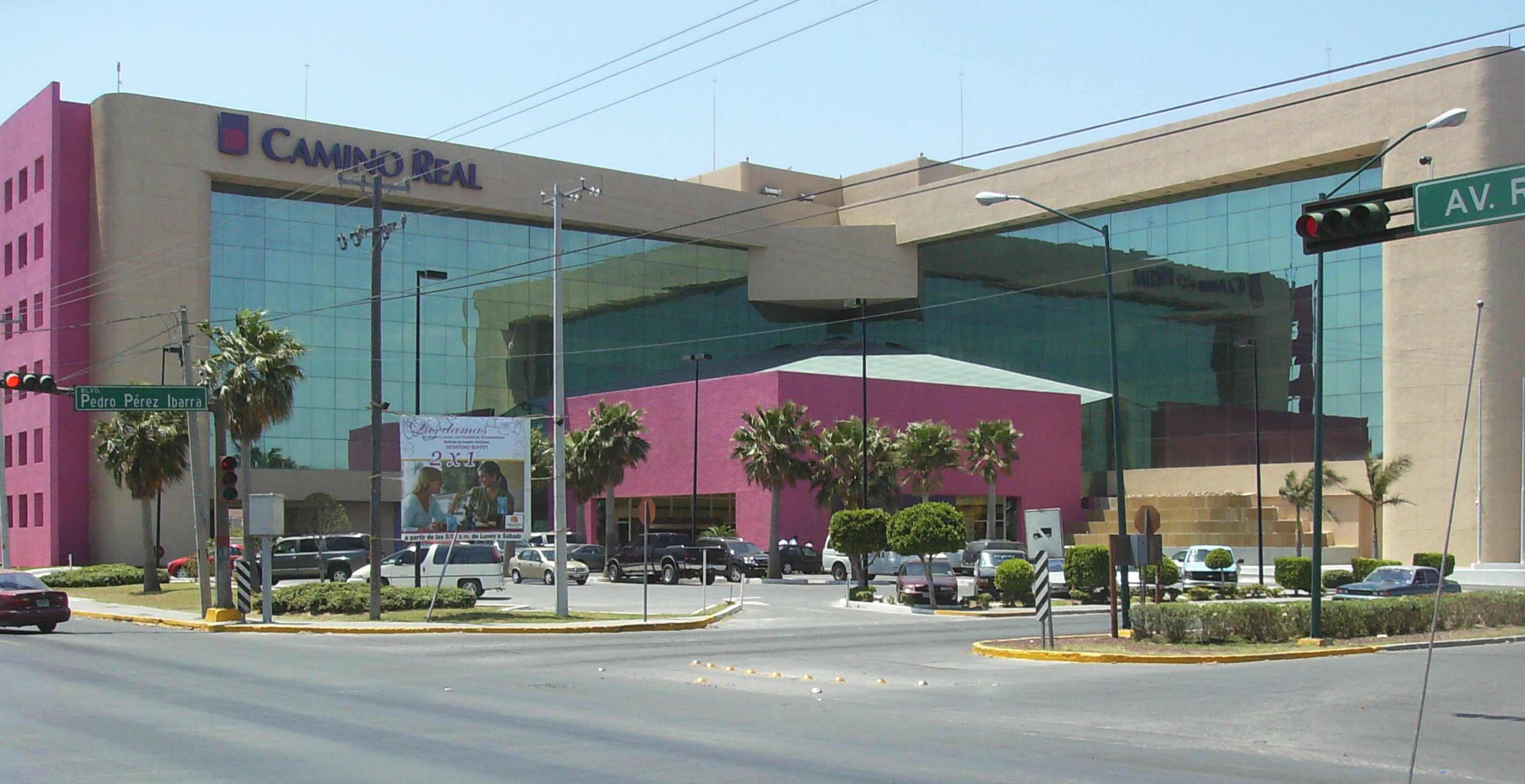
- The Camino Real in Nuevo Laredo
- Product type: Hotel
- Current owner: Grupo Vazol
- Country: Mexico
- Introduced: 1958; 68 years ago
- Related brands: Quinta Real, Real Inn
- Markets: Mexico
- Website: caminoreal.com.mx

Camino Real Hotels is a Mexican-based hotel chain that operates 18 hotels in Mexico.

== History ==
The first hotel to use the Camino Real name was the Camino Real Guadalajara, opened in 1958. The name of the hotel was taken from that given by 16th century Spaniards to the road that led to the capital of New Spain, today known as Mexico.

In 1960, Banamex and a group of private investors created Hoteles Camino Real. Their efforts would be bolstered in 1962 with an affiliation agreement with Western International Hotels (renamed Westin in 1980). The relationship between Westin and Camino Real established the first internationally backed luxury hotel chain in Mexico and ended 31 years later, in 1993.

In 2000, Camino Real was bought by business group Grupo Empresarial Ángeles for US$252 million. The deal included six hotels plus operating rights to 16 total hotels.

Currently there are 18 Camino Real hotels in Mexico. Grupo Real Turismo, the unit of GEA that operates hotels, also operates Quinta Real resorts and Real Inn hotels, which cater to business travelers.

== Amenities ==
One Camino Real hotel in Mexico City features a restaurant owned by Masaharu Morimoto.
