= XHQOO-FM =

Radio station in Cancún, Quintana Roo

- Puerto Morelos/Cancún, Quintana Roo; Mexico
- Broadcast area: Cancún
- Frequency: 90.7 MHz
- Branding: Imagen Radio

Programming
- Format: News/talk

Ownership
- Owner: Grupo Imagen; (GIM Televisión Nacional, S.A. de C.V.)

History
- First air date: November 10, 1988 (concession); 1994 (FM)
- Former frequencies: 1050 kHz (1988–2018)
- Call sign meaning: Quintana ROO

Technical information
- Licensing authority: CRT
- Class: B1
- ERP: 10 kW
- HAAT: 45.8 m (150 ft)
- Transmitter coordinates: 21°10′5″N 86°49′22″W

Links
- Website: imagencancun.mx

XHQOO-FM 90.7 is a radio station in Cancún, Quintana Roo, in Mexico. It is owned by Grupo Imagen and carries its Imagen Radio news/talk format.

== History ==
XEQOO-AM 1050 received its first concession on November 10, 1988. It was originally located in Cozumel and owned by Comunicación Popular del Caribe, S.A. de C.V. In 1994, it became an FM combo; in the early 2000s, the AM-FM stations moved to Cancún with an AM transmitter at Puerto Morelos (the FM transmitter is and remains in Cancún itself). From 1995 to 2004, XEQOO/XHQOO was known as Radio Pirata with a rock format. At times, it dominated the local radio ratings, with a 40% share compared to just eight percent for its next closest competitor. In 2004, Comunicación Popular del Caribe sold to Grupo Imagen, which flipped the station from rock-formatted Radio Pirata to its talk format (though it eventually picked up RMX part-time). The programmers behind Radio Pirata would later go on to found the Pirata FM network of permit stations, including XHCQR-FM 99.3.

Grupo Imagen surrendered the 1050 AM frequency, which last broadcast with 35,000 watts day and 2,500 night, to the Federal Telecommunications Institute in a letter dated January 23, 2018. Prior to the closure of RMX in June 2019, XHQOO broadcast selected RMX programs in evening hours.
