= XHLTN-FM =

Radio station in Tijuana, Baja California, Mexico

- Tijuana, Baja California; Mexico
- Broadcast area: San Diego–Tijuana
- Frequency: 104.5 MHz (HD Radio)
- Branding: Radio Latina

Programming
- Format: Spanish AC
- Subchannels: HD2: Imagen Radio

Ownership
- Owner: Grupo Imagen; (GIM Televisión Nacional, S.A. de C.V.)
- Sister stations: XHCTTI-TDT (Imagen Televisión)

History
- First air date: December 1971 (as XHERS-FM)
- Former call signs: XHERS-FM (December 10, 1970–February 17, 1984)
- Former frequencies: 100.1 MHz (1971-1984)
- Call sign meaning: From Branding "Radio Latina"

Technical information
- Licensing authority: CRT
- Class: B
- ERP: 120,000 watts
- HAAT: 132.2 meters (434 ft)
- Transmitter coordinates: 32°30′27″N 117°02′16″W

Links
- Webcast: Listen live
- Website: www.1045radiolatina.com

XHLTN-FM is a commercial radio station in Tijuana, Baja California, Mexico, broadcasting on 104.5 FM. It is owned by Grupo Imagen and carries its Radio Latina format. The station came on air in 1970.

== History ==
Joaquín Vargas Gómez, founder of MVS Radio, received the concession for XHOK-FM in December 1970. However, Vargas Gómez did not put the station on air. It would not be until December 1971 that the station signed on. It had been rebadged XHERS-FM and was operated by Paul Schafer's Time Sales Inc. from the United States. Time Sales, which also held the operating rights to XHIS-FM 90.3, ran the two stations as a cluster: XHIS "HIS Radio" and XHERS "HERS Radio". The stations' programming was produced at the Time Sales studios, at the Royal Inn at the Wharf in San Diego. While HIS Radio carried a hard-edge progressive rock format, HERS was programmed with softer rock.

Not long after signing on, the Time Sales cluster began running into various legal problems. The confluence of a new bilateral radio agreement which would regulate border radio (and required XHERS to move to 104.5), San Diego broadcasters who did not like the competition of Mexican stations targeting the US, and a US Federal Communications Commission investigation did the cluster in. In August 1974, the FCC ruled that Schafer and Time Sales violated the Brinkley Act with their operation; the resulting legal action bankrupted Schafer. XHERS was listed in publications in this period as having a "soul music" format.

By 1979, Vargas Gómez, who never incorporated XHERS into the MVS Radio operation, sold the station to XHERS, S.A., a concessionaire owned and operated by Califórmula Broadcasting and the owner of XHIS. In 1981, XHERS was broadcasting a beautiful music format when the Califórmula cluster was hit by a strike called by STIRT, the Mexican broadcast workers' union, over a program critical of the Governor of Baja California. The strike forced Díaz to sell to Organización Radio Centro and its head, Francisco Aguirre, which brought an end to the action after two months. Two years later, Díaz bought back the stations and relaunched them with new formats and callsigns. The callsign was changed to XHLTN-FM in February 1984, coinciding with the change to the Radio Latina name and format.

In 1993, two workers died on the XHLTN tower. They were installing a large piece of transmission equipment, to which they were harnessed, when a cable gave way and the workers fell to their deaths.

XHLTN was acquired by Grupo Imagen in 2004.
