= XHCC-FM =

Radio station in Colima, Colima

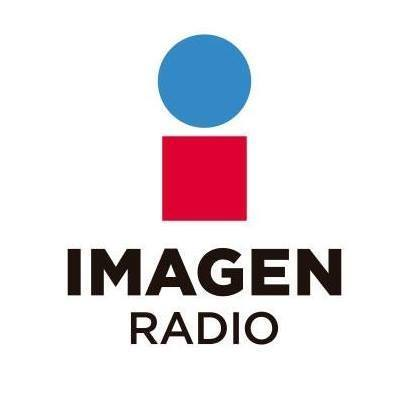
- Colima, Colima, Mexico; Mexico
- Broadcast area: Colima, Colima
- Frequency: 89.3 FM
- Branding: Imagen Radio

Programming
- Format: News/talk

Ownership
- Owner: Grupo Imagen; (GIM Televisión Nacional, S.A. de C.V.)

History
- First air date: October 28, 1993 (concession)
- Call sign meaning: Colima Colima

Technical information
- ERP: 36,000 watts

Links
- Webcast: XHCC on TuneIn
- Website: www.imagencolima.mx

XHCC-FM is a radio station on 89.3 FM in Colima, Colima. The station is owned by Grupo Imagen and carries its talk format.

== History ==
XHCC began with a concession issued in 1993 to Gonzalo Castellot Madrazo. XHCC was known as Volcán FM. After 13 years, XHCC was sold to Grupo Imagen.
