= WLYY (FM) =

Radio station in Louisville, Mississippi

- Louisville, Mississippi; United States
- Broadcast area: Louisville, Mississippi
- Frequency: 90.7 MHz

Programming
- Format: Southern Gospel

Ownership
- Owner: Joy Christian Ministries Church

History
- Former call signs: KOUI (2009–2023)

Technical information
- Licensing authority: FCC
- Facility ID: 1777205
- Class: A
- ERP: 200 watts
- HAAT: 34.0 meters
- Transmitter coordinates: 33°07′18″N 89°06′36″W

Links
- Public license information: Public file; LMS
- Webcast: WLYY Listen Live

WLYY (90.7 FM) is a radio station licensed to Louisville, Mississippi, United States. The station is currently owned by Joy Christian Ministries Church.

WLYY broadcasts a southern gospel format to the Louisville, Mississippi, area.

== History ==
This station was assigned call sign KOUI on February 6, 2009. It changed its call sign to WLYY on July 20, 2023.
