= WJSC-FM =

Radio station at Northern Vermont University in Johnson, Vermont

- Johnson, Vermont; United States
- Frequency: 90.7 MHz
- Branding: Radio Johnson 90.7

Programming
- Format: College

Ownership
- Owner: Vermont State University–Johnson; (Board of Trustees, Vermont State Colleges)

History
- First air date: July 16, 1972
- Call sign meaning: Johnson State College

Technical information
- Licensing authority: FCC
- Facility ID: 6121
- Class: A
- ERP: 200 watts
- HAAT: -149 meters (-488 feet)
- Transmitter coordinates: 44°38′29″N 72°40′20″W

Links
- Public license information: Public file; LMS
- Webcast: WJSC-FM
- Website: www.northernvermont.edu/wjsc-radio-johnson

WJSC-FM (90.7 FM) is a College formatted radio station licensed to serve Johnson, Vermont. The station is owned by Northern Vermont University–Johnson and licensed to the Board of Trustees, Vermont State Colleges.

== History ==
WJSC traces its history to an unlicensed AM station that began operating on the campus of what was then Johnson State College in the fall of 1968. The station broadcast at 5 watts with the fake call letters "WLUV" on the AM band at 640 kHz. The station could only be heard in the farthest reaches of Arthur and Martinetti residence halls. WJSC first broadcast from a cramped music practice room in Governors Hall, but in early 1970, it was asked to move. The station was moved to Stearns Hall, in what is now known as Stearns Stage Space.

During the 1971 calendar year the station staff developed plans to seek licensing from the FCC for operation as a non-commercial, educational station broadcasting with 10 watts; the college applied for a construction permit to build a new station on 90.1 MHz, which was granted in March 1972. The university also reorganized the station staff in preparation for the changeover. WJSC-FM launched on July 16, 1972; that fall of that year, the station was moved into spacious and well-equipped studios in the basement of Senators Hall. While the entire campus could hear the station, raising its profile, the station was co-channel to WRUV in Burlington—not an issue, provided both stations broadcast with 10 watts of power. When she attended Johnson State, Cyndi Lauper was a DJ on WJSC-FM.

As the 1970s ended, the FCC began to phase out 10-watt non-commercial stations. At the end of 1979, WJSC applied to move to 90.7 MHz and increase its power to 155 watts; the increase took effect on September 10, 1982. WJSC remained in the studios in Senators Hall for about 25 years until it moved into the renovated Dewey Campus Center in 1997. The move to Dewey brought the station into the digital age, with the introduction of computers, automation, and high-end audio editing software for sound production. In 2008, the station became all automated for 8 months while construction took place on the Stearns Student Center, resulting in a new and upgraded studio.
