= WGSN =

- Newport, Tennessee; United States
- Broadcast area: East Tennessee, Western North Carolina, South East Kentucky, Western Virginia
- Frequency: 90.7 MHz
- Branding: New Life 90.7

Programming
- Format: Southern Gospel

Ownership
- Owner: New Life Studios, Inc.

Technical information
- Licensing authority: FCC
- Facility ID: 84765
- Class: C2
- ERP: 1,000 watts
- HAAT: 0.0 meters (0 ft)
- Transmitter coordinates: 35°54′20.00″N 83°17′48.00″W

Links
- Public license information: Public file; LMS
- Webcast: Listen live
- Website: wgsnradio.com

WGSN (90.7 FM, "New Life 90.7") is a radio station broadcasting a Southern Gospel music format. Licensed to Newport, Tennessee, United States, the station is currently owned by New Life Studios, Inc. The General Manager for WGSN is Connie Cody.
