= Grupo Vazol =

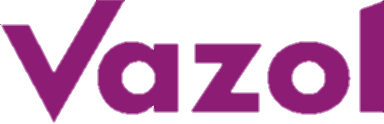
- Formerly: Grupo Empresarial Ángeles
- Company type: Private
- Industry: Hotels, healthcare, media, financial services
- Founded: 1998 (as Grupo Empresarial Ángeles); 2024 (as Grupo Vazol)
- Founder: Olegario Vázquez Raña
- Headquarters: Mexico City
- Key people: Olegario Vázquez Aldir, chairman
- Subsidiaries: Camino Real Hotels; Grupo Ángeles Servicios de Salud; Grupo Financiero Multiva; Grupo Imagen; Laboratorios Kener
- Website: grupovazol.com

Grupo Vazol, formerly known as Grupo Empresarial Ángeles (GEA), is a Mexican corporation founded in 1998. It owns assets in the communications, healthcare, tourism and financial services industries. Its chairman is Olegario Vázquez Aldir.

== History ==
GEA was formally founded in 1998 by Vázquez Raña, though its history dates to 1986 and the acquisition of Hospital Humana (now Hospital Ángeles de Pedregal).

GEA has grown rapidly through acquisitions, particularly in the 2000s and 2010s. 1999 saw it acquire the Camino Real hotel chain, which formed the cornerstone of its tourism and hospitality business. In 2003, it bought Grupo Imagen. 2006 saw the acquisition of Multiva, its financial services unit, and of the Excélsior newspaper and channel 28 in Mexico City, the precursor to its Imagen Televisión national network.

In 2014, GEA, through its Grupo Imagen unit, bought Querétaro FC out of government administration. This came after the previous owner of the team was investigated for bank fraud.

On December 12, 2024, the end of Grupo Empresarial Ángeles as a corporate identity was announced, and it was renamed Grupo Vazol. Meanwhile, the name Ángeles was retained for the hospitals bearing that name. In turn, Olegario Vázquez Aldair became the new president of the company.

Logo used until December 2024

== Business sectors ==
=== Communications: Grupo Imagen ===
Grupo Imagen Multimedia is a media conglomerate consisting of Excélsior, a national-circulation newspaper; Imagen Radio, a national radio network along with other stations; the Imagen Televisión national network, and Excélsior Televisión, a cable news outlet carried over the air on XHTRES-TDT in Mexico City.

=== Healthcare: Grupo Ángeles Servicios de Salud ===
GEA began in the hospital industry when it acquired the failing Hospital Humana in 1986. Today, it owns Grupo Ángeles Servicios de Salud, which owns and operates the Hospital Ángeles hospital system composed of 28 hospital facilities across Mexico, 10 of which are in the Mexico City area. Vázquez Aldir considers the hospitals to be the "jewel in the crown" of the conglomerate.

=== Tourism: Grupo Real Turismo ===
In 1999, GEA acquired Grupo Real Turismo, which operated the Camino Real Hotels chain, for US$300 million. GEA repositioned it to focus on the business traveler market.

GEA also owns two other hotel concepts: Quinta Real, a luxury hotel system, and Real Inn, a mid-tier hotel catering to business travelers. In total, there are 41 hotels with more than 6,800 rooms.

The tourism unit traded as a public company until delisting itself from the Bolsa Mexicana de Valores in June 2016.

=== Financial services: Grupo Financiero Multiva ===
Grupo Financiero Multiva was acquired by GEA in 2006. It operates a bank, brokerage firm, insurance company and investment funds.
