= WMCO =

Coordinates: 39.9962°N 81.7215°W

- New Concord, Ohio; United States
- Broadcast area: East-Central Ohio
- Frequency: 90.7
- Branding: The Orbit 90.7

Programming
- Format: college/eclectic

Ownership
- Owner: Muskingum University

History
- Call sign meaning: Muskingum County, Ohio (area served)

Technical information
- Licensing authority: FCC
- Facility ID: 47111
- Class: Class A Non-Commercial FM
- ERP: 1,300 Watts
- HAAT: 26 meters

Links
- Public license information: Public file; LMS
- Website: WMCO website

WMCO (90.7 FM) is a radio station located in New Concord, Ohio. WMCO is licensed to Muskingum University as a non-commercial educational radio station and serves east-central Ohio including the cities of Zanesville and Cambridge from the antenna site in New Concord, Ohio. Dr. Lisa Marshall is the current station manager and has held the role since 2007.

== Programming ==
WMCO plays all types of music, with a concentration on newly released, non-mainstream music. WMCO is part of the academic program of the Department of Communication, Media, & Theatre and is operated by students in media classes and campus and community volunteers. The target audience includes Muskingum University students, area high school and middle school students, and area residents.

== History ==
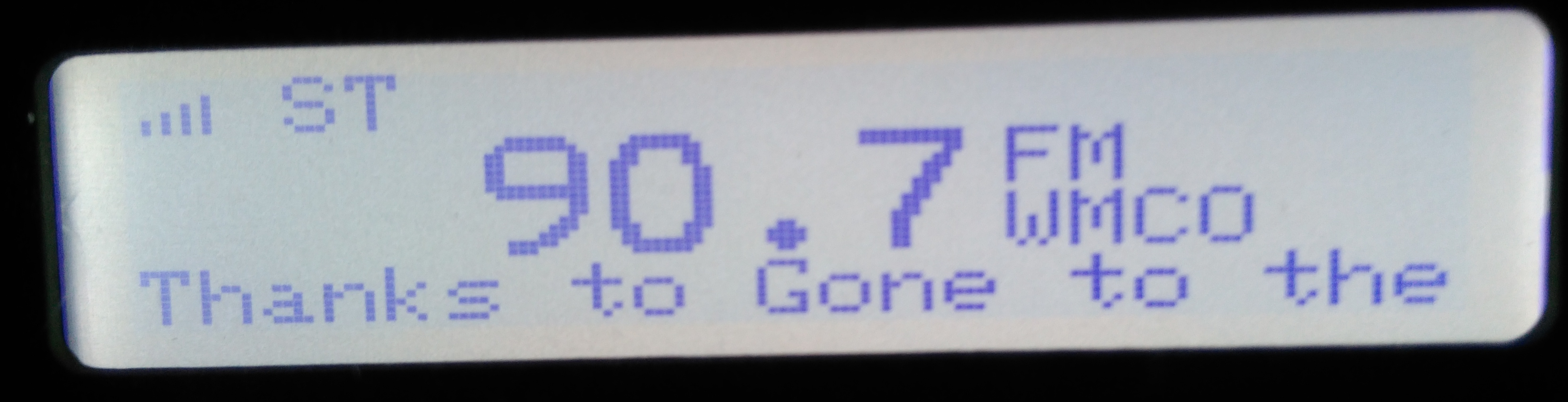
WMCO on a SPARC HD Radio with RDS.

On January 28, 1961, WMCO began broadcasting from the basement of Cambridge Hall. In the fall of 2004, WMCO officially relocated their studios to Caldwell Hall, where the station currently resides. In January 2011, WMCO celebrated its fiftieth anniversary. On January 27, 2012, WMCO began streaming online. The station is currently known as "The Orbit 90.7" as a homage to John Glenn's 1962 orbit around the Earth.

== Awards ==
- WMCO was awarded two Associated Press Broadcasters Awards, Best Use of Sound and Best Continuing Coverage, with the coverage of John Glenn's shuttle trip in 1999.
- In 1991, WMCO was named the Ohio Associated Press Best Local Sports Operation, small market.
