= KOBC =

- Joplin, Missouri; United States
- Broadcast area: Joplin
- Frequency: 90.7 MHz
- Branding: K-Love

Programming
- Format: Contemporary Christian
- Affiliations: K-Love

Ownership
- Owner: Educational Media Foundation
- Sister stations: K-LOVE network

History
- Former call signs: KGNT-AM
- Call sign meaning: "Ozark Bible College", now Ozark Christian College, KOBC's former owner.

Technical information
- Licensing authority: FCC
- Facility ID: 51096
- Class: C1
- ERP: 60,000 watts
- HAAT: 151.0 meters
- Transmitter coordinates: 37°3′8.00″N 94°23′20.00″W

Links
- Public license information: Public file; LMS
- Webcast: KOBC's High Speed Stream
- Website: kobc.org

KOBC (90.7 FM) is a radio station broadcasting a Contemporary Christian format. Licensed to Joplin, Missouri, United States, the station serves the Joplin area.

== Past ==
KOBC was founded on February 24, 1967, by its previous owner, Ozark Christian College and operated on the 91.1 FM frequency. In 1972, the Federal Communications Commission (FCC) approved a license to increase transmitting power to 30,000 watts and change the frequency to 90.7 FM. Transmission power was raised again in 1998 to 60,000 watts, effectively increasing KOBC's listening area by 40%.

== Sale of KOBC ==
OCC sold KOBC to its current owner, the Educational Media Foundation, on October 1, 2008.

== Translators ==
In December 1987, an FM translator was added in Chanute, KS at 103.1 FM. A second translator was added for Fayetteville, AR in July 1988 at 100.1 FM, but it was disassembled after another Christian radio station began broadcasting in Fayetteville in 1996. The Chanute translator continues to operate.
