= XHCRIS-FM =

Radio station in San Cristóbal de las Casas, Chiapas

- San Cristóbal de las Casas, Chiapas; Mexico
- Frequency: 90.7 MHz
- Branding: Veritas Radio

Programming
- Format: Community radio

Ownership
- Owner: Veritas Medios Global, A.C.

History
- First air date: November 2012
- Call sign meaning: San CRIStóbal

Technical information
- ERP: 2.9 kW
- HAAT: -36.21 m
- Transmitter coordinates: 16°43′33.3″N 92°37′59.2″W

Links
- Webcast: XHCRIS-FM
- Website: www.veritasmedios.org

XHCRIS-FM is a radio station in San Cristóbal de las Casas, Chiapas, in Mexico. Known as Veritas Radio 90.7 FM, XHCRIS is owned by Veritas Medios Global, a civil association that promotes culture and human values.

== History ==
The station launched in November 2012; the station's studio was blessed by Catholic bishop Felipe Arizmendi Esquivel upon its inauguration.
