= Fortaleza FM =

Fortaleza FM (ZYS 811)
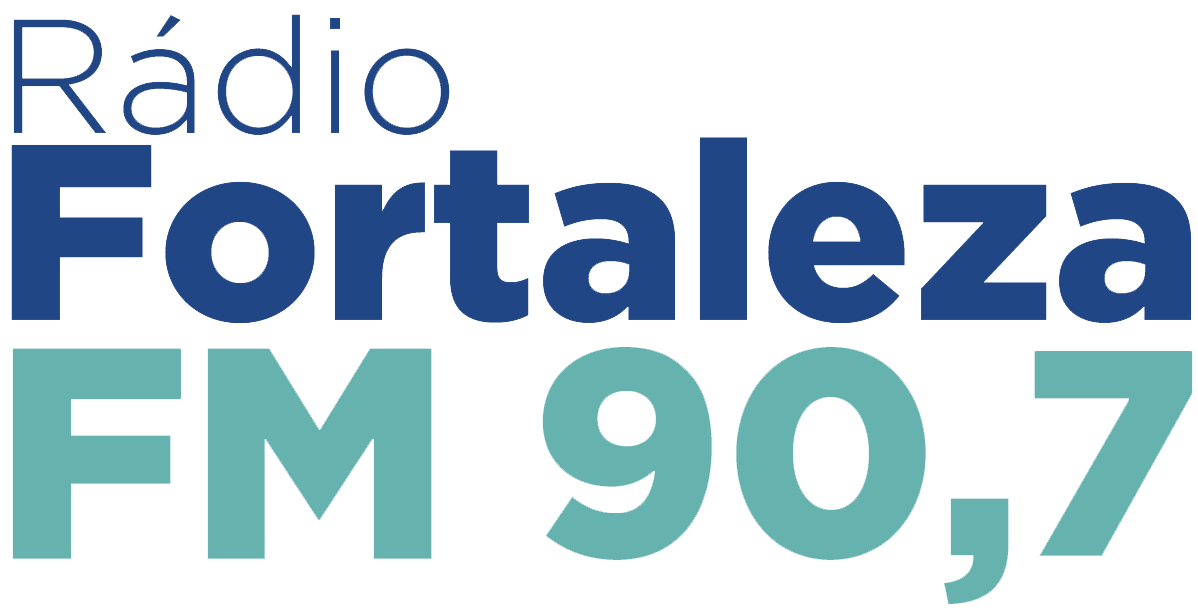

Maracanaú, Ceará; Brazil
- Broadcast area: Fortaleza, Ceará
- Frequency: 90.7 MHz

Programming
- Language: Portuguese
- Format: Music; Public

Ownership
- Owner: Fundação de Radiodifusão Educativa Nossa Senhora Milagrosa
- Operator: Câmara Municipal de Fortaleza
- Sister stations: TV Câmara Fortaleza

History
- First air date: February 1, 2011
- Former names: FM Câmara; Rádio Fortaleza

Technical information
- Licensing authority: ANATEL
- Class: A4
- ERP: 16.2 kW

Links
- Public license information: Profile

Fortaleza FM (ZYS 811) is a Brazilian radio station based in Fortaleza, Ceará, and licensed to Maracanaú. The frequency is owned by the Fundação de Radiodifusão Educativa Nossa Senhora Milagrosa, operated by the Câmara Municipal de Fortaleza, which broadcasts plenary sessions, as well as producing talk programs and performing regional music, with an emphasis on artists from Ceará and northeastern Brazil. The radio station was officially launched on February 1, 2011, although it has been operating since 2009.

== History ==
In the first half of 2009, the Câmara Municipal de Fortaleza signed a partnership with the Fundação José Possidônio Peixoto to take over three hours of programming from Líder FM, a popular radio station from Caucaia that operated on 107.3 MHz. The initiative came from Councillor Salmito Filho, then president of the Board of Directors, who appointed journalist Oceli Lopes to look for radio stations, AM or FM. The mission was carried out by journalist Paulo Sérgio Cordeiro, who in just over a week coordinated the study and execution of the project to broadcast via Modulated Frequency (FM), which could "give visibility and transparency to the actions of the House", according to a text published by Paulo Tadeu in the newspaper O Estado.

The project was called FM Câmara and was broadcast in the morning, from Monday to Friday from 9:30 am to 12:30 pm. Broadcasts were made of the Chamber's sessions, as well as interviews with authorities and councillors. While the radio station was kept on the air through a partnership, the Chamber planned to operate under its own concession in the future.

In 2011, FM Câmara ended its partnership with Líder FM after the latter changed its segmentation (from popular to religious/gospel, and was renamed Líder Gospel FM) and frequency (107.3 MHz to 92.1 MHz). As a result, the Câmara Municipal de Fortaleza began an effort to occupy a new station with expanded programming, entering into a partnership with Grupo Cearasat de Comunicação, owned by Donizete Arruda and, at the time, Luzenor de Oliveira, and began operations on 93.5 MHz, a concession licensed to the city of Pindoretama, which had been operating Rede SomZoom Sat since 2010. The new Fortaleza FM was inaugurated on February 1, 2011, and its new programming included debate, community and journalistic programs, as well as music based on international songs from the 1980s and MPB. Acrísio Sena, then president of the city council, said at the time that the council's ultimate goal was to obtain an educational radio concession.

Operation on the 93.5 MHz frequency lasted until March 6, 2014. On that day, the station had its programming replaced by the gospel station FM Ministério Canaã, from the Assembleia de Deus Canaã, and began operating on 106.1 MHz, a station licensed for the city of Cascavel. Fortaleza FM began operating on an experimental basis and replaced Plus FM, a network linked to the Grupo Cearasat. The expectation was to inaugurate the new studios in the same month, which only happened on April 10, 2014. The new studio was named after journalist Messias Pontes, who had died the previous year.

In May 2017, Fortaleza FM went off the air on 106.1 MHz. The station continued its operations on the internet and returned to the dial on June 6, 2017, when it debuted on 90.7 MHz, which was expected to debut new programming after the departure of Feliz FM. Since January 2025, Fortaleza FM has been reformulated and its music programming has focused on regional music and music produced by Ceará artists of various styles, including forró, rap, trap, rock and MPB.
