= Olegario González de Cardedal =

Spanish Catholic theologian and author (born 1934)

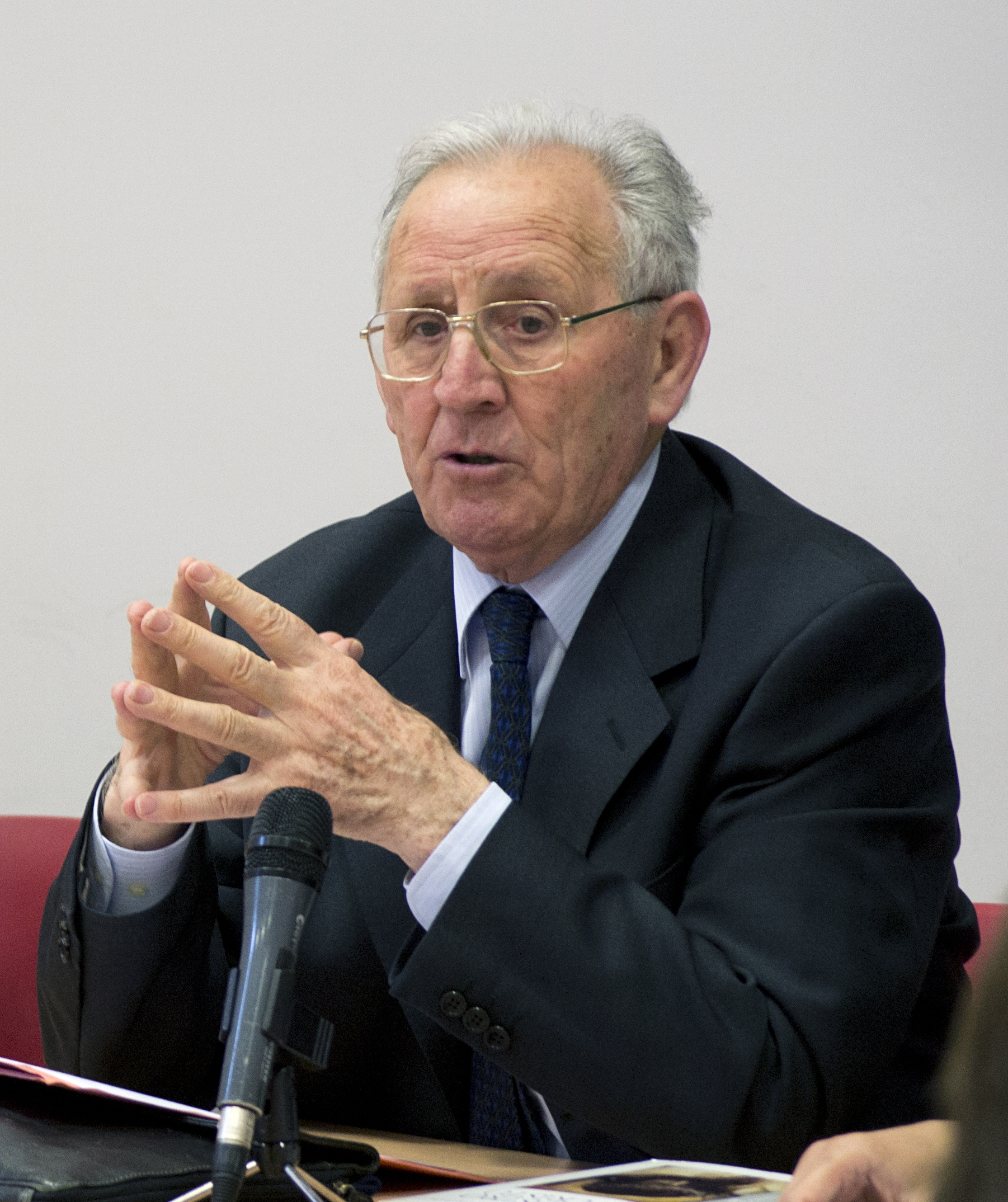
- Olegario González de Cardedal in 2013
- Born: October 2, 1934 (age 91); Lastra del Cano (Ávila), Spain
- Occupation: Professor at the Pontifical University of Salamanca
- Notable work: Salvador del mundo - historia y actualidad de Jesucristo, La teología en España, 1959–2009: memoria y prospectiva
- Title: Reverend Father

Olegario González de Cardedal (born 2 October 1934, Santiago de Tormes, Spain) is a Spanish Catholic theologian and author. He was born in Lastra del Cano (Ávila), Spain, in 1934. He studied in Ávila, where he was ordained a priest in 1959, and at LMU Munich, Germany, where he graduated in theology in 1964. He also continued his studies in Oxford and Washington. As Chair of Theology at the Pontifical University of Salamanca, Spain, a position he still holds, he took part in the third session of the Second Vatican Council and in the International Theological Conference. He is also an ordinary member of the Spanish Real Academia de Ciencias Morales y Políticas (Royal Academy of Moral and Political Sciences) in Madrid.

== Theological works ==
Olegario de Cardedal's primary academic interest appears to be Christology (in which inter alia he has shown interest in Anglican contributions). His many publications include: Meditación teológica desde España, 1970; Elogio de la encina. Existencia cristiana y fidelidad creadora, 1973; La gloria del hombre, 1973; Jesús de Nazaret. Aproximación a la cristología, 1975; La gloria del hombre. Reto entre una cultura de la fe y una cultura de la increencia, 1985; Raíz de la esperanza, 1995; Cuatro poetas desde la otra ladera. Unamuno, Jean Paul, Machado, Oscar Wilde, 1996; La entraña del cristianismo, 1997; Cristología, 2001; Sobre la muerte, 2002, Dios, 2004. He observed in La entraña del cristianismo that there are "gaps in theology" which need to be filled by practical spirituality and popular piety, a view quoted with approval by Pope Francis in his 2024 encyclical letter, Dilexit nos.

Olegario de Cardedal organised a succession of theology summer schools in Santander and has also written many essays on the current situation of the Catholic Church in Spain.

== Awards ==
- Ratzinger Prize (issued by the Ratzinger Foundation), 30 June 2011, the ceremony took place in the Clementine Hall. Fellow recipients were Manlio Simonetti and Maximilian Heim.
