= KWLJ-LP =

- Moorhead, Minnesota; United States
- Frequency: 90.7 MHz

Programming
- Format: Religious

Ownership
- Owner: Bible Truth Radio, Inc.

History
- First air date: 2017

Technical information
- Licensing authority: FCC
- Facility ID: 195959
- Class: L1
- ERP: 70 watts
- HAAT: 14.1 meters (46 ft)
- Transmitter coordinates: 46°38′47.9″N 96°21′51.2″W

Links
- Public license information: LMS

KWLJ-LP is a religious formatted broadcast radio station licensed to and serving Moorhead, Minnesota. It is owned by Bible Truth Radio, Inc.
