= KNFA =

- Grand Island, Nebraska; United States
- Frequency: 90.7 MHz

Programming
- Format: Religious

Ownership
- Owner: Family Worship Center Church

Technical information
- Licensing authority: FCC
- Facility ID: 91196
- Class: A
- ERP: 1,300 watts
- HAAT: 58.3 meters (191 ft)
- Transmitter coordinates: 40°54′50″N 98°23′52″W

Links
- Public license information: Public file; LMS
- Website: http://sonlifetv.com

KNFA (90.7 FM) is a radio station broadcasting a Religious music format. Licensed to Grand Island, Nebraska, United States, the station is currently owned by Family Worship Center Church.
