= KEZB =

Coordinates: 38°17′13″N 112°38′19″W

- Beaver, Utah; United States
- Frequency: 90.7 MHz

Programming
- Format: Christian radio

Ownership
- Owner: First Baptist Church, Beaver, UT; (Beaver Radio)

Technical information
- Licensing authority: FCC
- Facility ID: 175866
- Class: A
- ERP: 150 watts
- HAAT: 302 meters (991 ft)

Links
- Public license information: Public file; LMS
- Webcast: Listen live
- Website: fbcbeaver.wordpress.com/kezb-fm

KEZB is a radio station airing a Christian format licensed to Beaver, Utah, broadcasting on 90.7 FM. The station is owned by First Baptist Church.
