= Olegario Vázquez Aldir =

Mexican businessman (born 1972)

- Born: Olegario Vázquez Aldir; April 28, 1972 (age 54); Mexico City

Olegario Vázquez Aldir (born April 28, 1972) is a Mexican businessman and the president of Grupo Vazol, the evolved form of Grupo Empresarial Ángeles Grupo Empresarial Ángeles. With an estimated net worth of US$9.3 billion, he is one of the wealthiest figures in Mexico.

== Early life ==
Vázquez Aldir was born in Mexico City on April 28, 1972. Vázquez Aldir earned a Bachelor's degree in Business Administration from Universidad Iberoamericana. He later pursued postgraduate studies in Administration at Boston University, Strategic Planning at Instituto Tecnológico Autónomo de México and Healthcare Administration and Strategic Planning at Universidad Nacional Autónoma de México.

== Career ==
In 1996, he was appointed CEO of Hospital Ángeles del Pedregal. In 2000, he became Chief Corporate Officer and began expanding the Healthcare Division of Grupo Ángeles. On October 6, 2020, the Board of Directors named him Executive Chairman of Grupo Empresarial Ángeles. On April 20, 2024, he was appointed President and CEO of the group.

Among his key accomplishments is the founding of Grupo Empresarial Ángeles in 1998. In 2000, he oversaw the acquisition, restructuring, and relaunch of the Camino Real hotel chain. In 2003, he consolidated the acquisition and formation of Grupo Imagen Multimedia, a media conglomerate that brings together multiple platforms, including radio, television, print, and digital media. In 2005, he led the acquisition of Grupo Financiero Multiva.

As president of Grupo Vazol, he is responsible for planning, implementing, and evaluating strategies for the group's expansion across all sectors.

== Career timeline ==
- 1996: Appointed CEO of Hospital Ángeles del Pedregal
- 1997–1999: Grupo Empresarial Ángeles focuses on service industries and begins expanding into healthcare
- 2000: Acquires Camino Real hotel chain and enters the tourism sector
- 2003: Enters media by acquiring Grupo Imagen
- 2006: Acquires Excélsior newspaper and relaunches it with national reach
- 2006: Acquires Channel 28 and solidifies Grupo Imagen as a media company
- 2006: Acquires Grupo Financiero Multiva (brokerage, leasing, investment funds, later a bank)
- 2007: Relaunches Channel 28 as cadenatres, making it Mexico's third national broadcast network at the time
- 2011: Acquires Quinta Real Hotels as part of its Hospitality Division
- 2012: Launches the Real Inn brand
- 2014: Becomes co-owner of Querétaro Football Club

== Telecommunications sector ==
In 2003, Grupo Imagen Telecomunicaciones was sold to Grupo Empresarial Ángeles (GEA). Vázquez Aldir submitted a capital and acquisition offer to the Fernández family (who held 48% of shares) and businessman Alfonso Romo (owner of 27%). This move opened the door for GEA to enter the communications industry.

After acquiring Grupo Imagen, Vázquez Aldir restructured its business strategy and acquired new radio frequencies nationwide to expand the reach of Imagen Informativa.

In 2006, he continued the group's growth by acquiring Excélsior, a nationally distributed newspaper. This marked the end of the workers' cooperative that previously managed it and ushered in a new era. The newspaper was relaunched on March 18, 2006—its 89th anniversary—with a new design and a roster of prominent journalists and columnists, strengthening its presence in Mexico's media landscape.

That same year, he also acquired XHRAE-TV to enter the television market in Mexico City. The channel was relaunched on May 28, 2007, as cadenatres, reaching audiences across Mexico thanks to agreements with PCTV (to include it in all cable TV systems) and Grupo Televisa (for satellite broadcasting).

By mid-2010, these acquisitions were fully integrated into what became Grupo Imagen Multimedia, a diversified audiovisual media conglomerate including Reporte 98.5 and Imagen Informativa 90.5 radio stations, Excélsior newspaper, and the TV channels Excélsior Televisión and Cadena 3.

In September 2016, the media group officially rebranded as Grupo Imagen, launching its own national broadcast channel, Imagen Televisión.

== Financial sector ==
In parallel to his telecom ventures, Vázquez Aldir acquired Multivalores Grupo Financiero in 2006, which at the time included a brokerage firm, a mutual fund operator, and a leasing company. In March 2007, it evolved into Banco Multiva and Seguros Multiva. His vision was to transform it into one of Mexico's leading financial institutions.

== Social engagement ==
Vázquez Aldir is a distinguished member of the Mexican Health Foundation (Fundación Mexicana para la Salud), the Chapultepec Forest Foundation, and the Teletón Foundation. He also serves on the boards of the Communication Council (Consejo de la Comunicación), the National Institute of Public Health, and Universidad Iberoamericana. Additionally, he is Vice President of the Mexican Red Cross Board, an active member of the Ibero-American Telecommunications Organization (OTI), and a permanent member of the Mexican Olympic Committee.

== Sports ==
Beyond his business pursuits, Vázquez Aldir is known for his passion for sports, particularly in Olympic trap shooting, where he has represented Mexico in international competitions.

He also played a notable role as owner and president of the Querétaro Football Club, where he helped modernize the team's business model and made headlines by bringing Brazilian footballer Ronaldinho to play in Mexico.

== See also ==
- Olegario Vázquez Raña
