= KTTK (FM) =

- Lebanon, Missouri; United States
- Frequency: 90.7 MHz
- Branding: Power FM

Programming
- Format: Southern Gospel

Ownership
- Owner: Lebanon Educational Broadcasting Foundation

Technical information
- Licensing authority: FCC
- Facility ID: 36882
- Class: C3
- ERP: 11,000 watts
- HAAT: 145 meters (476 ft)
- Transmitter coordinates: 37.65698°N 92.69711°W

Links
- Public license information: Public file; LMS
- Website: www.kttkpowerfm.org

KTTK (90.7 FM) is a radio station licensed to Lebanon, Missouri. The station broadcasts a Southern Gospel format and is owned by Lebanon Educational Broadcasting Foundation.
