= XEDA-FM =

Radio station in Mexico City

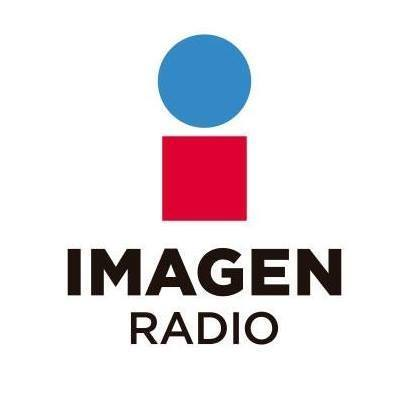
- Mexico City; Mexico
- Frequency: 90.5 MHz (HD Radio)
- Branding: Imagen Radio

Programming
- Format: News/talk
- Subchannels: HD2: RMX Radio

Ownership
- Owner: Grupo Imagen; (GIM Televisión Nacional, S.A. de C.V.)
- Sister stations: Imagen Televisión

History
- First air date: 1962

Technical information
- Licensing authority: CRT
- Class: C
- ERP: 100,000 Watts
- HAAT: 512.8 meters (1,682 ft)
- Transmitter coordinates: 19°32′05.2″N 99°07′47.5″W

Links
- Webcast: Listen live
- Website: imagenradio.com.mx

XEDA-FM is a radio station in Mexico City owned by Grupo Imagen. XEDA-FM is the flagship station of the Imagen Radio news/talk network which is available to other Mexican cities through Imagen's owned-and-operated stations and affiliates.

XEDA-FM is authorized to broadcast in HD. but the station doesn't use this feature. The transmitter site is located atop Cerro del Chiquihuite.

== History ==
In 1968, Publicistas, S.A., received the concession to sign on XEDA-FM 90.5 in Mexico City, and was later acquired by Grupo Imagen, who branded the station as "Radio Imagen" airing contemporary music. In 1992, it adopted a Top 40 format as "Pulsar FM". In 2000, it became a talk station, simply known as "Imagen 90.5" and soon forming a national network. It still retains some musical programming in the overnight hours.

== Affiliates owned by Grupo Imagen ==
- XHQOO-FM 90.7 MHz - Cancún, Quintana Roo
- XHCHI-FM 97.3 MHz - Chihuahua, Chihuahua
- XHPCPG-FM 98.1 MHz - Chilpancingo, Guerrero
- XEDA-FM 90.5 MHz - México City
- XHCC-FM 89.3 MHz - Colima, Colima
- XHSC-FM 93.9 MHz - Guadalajara, Jalisco
- XHHLL-FM 90.7 MHz (HD2) - Hermosillo, Sonora
- XHCCCT-FM 94.1 MHz - Mérida, Yucatán
- XHCMS-FM 105.5 MHz - Mexicali, Baja California
- XHMN-FM 107.7 MHz - Monterrey, Nuevo León
- XHTLN-FM 94.1 MHz - Nuevo Laredo, Tamaulipas
- XHOLA-FM 105.1 MHz - Puebla, Puebla
- XHOZ-FM 94.7 MHz - Querétaro, Queretaro
- XHRP-FM 94.7 MHz - Saltillo, Coahuila
- XHEPO-FM 103.1 MHz - San Luis Potosí, San Luis Potosi
- XHMIG-FM 105.9 MHz - San Miguel de Allende, Guanajuato
- XHMDR-FM 103.1 MHz - Tampico, Tamaulipas
- XHLTN-FM 104.5 MHz (HD2) - Tijuana, Baja California
- XHEN-FM 100.3 MHz - Torreón, Coahuila
- XHQRV-FM 92.5 MHz - Veracruz, Veracruz
