= Grupo Imagen =

Mexican media conglomerate

Grupo Imagen, S.A.B. de C.V.
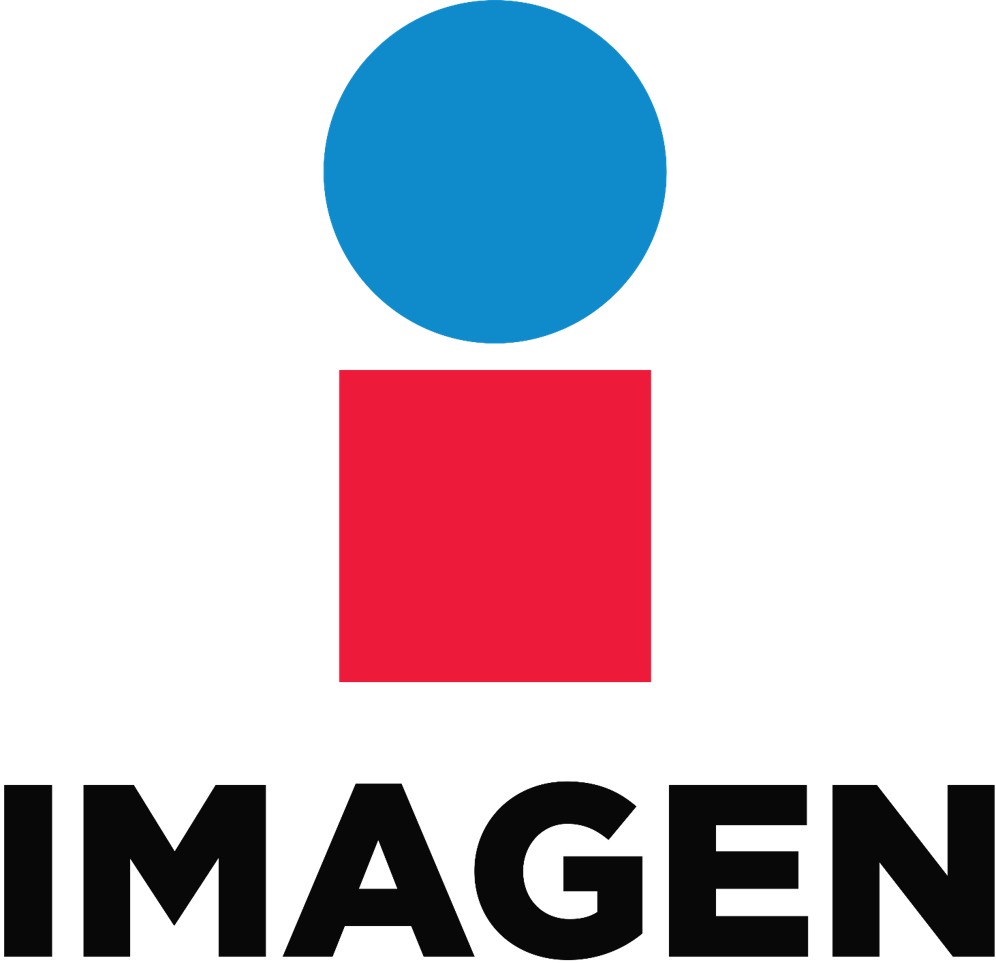
- Company type: Private
- Industry: Media conglomerate
- Founded: June 18, 1936; 89 years ago
- Headquarters: Mexico City, Mexico
- Key people: Olegario Vázquez Aldir (president)
- Products: Television, radio, internet and publishing
- Number of employees: 2,000
- Parent: Grupo Vazol
- Website: www.imagen.com.mx

Grupo Imagen S.A.B. de C.V., commonly known as Imagen, is a Mexican media conglomerate owned by Grupo Vazol. As of 2016, it is the third-largest mass media company in Mexico after Televisa and TV Azteca.

== History ==
Grupo Imagen traces its roots to the foundation of XEDA-AM on June 18, 1936. This station was acquired by José Luis Fernández Soto in 1962, and in the same year, Fernández Soto founded "Grupo Imagen Comunicación en Radio", which became the operator of XEDA-AM and XEDA-FM. In 1963, Grupo Imagen doubled in size with the acquisition of Radio Metropolitana and its XELA-AM-FM cluster. With these four stations, Grupo Imagen began to form a wide range of programming. While XEDA-FM remained Imagen's flagship with a talk format and XELA-AM continued with its longtime classical music programming, the other two stations changed programming concepts often. In the 1980s, XELA-FM became XHDL-FM "Dial FM", changing formats to rock as "Radioactivo" in the 1990s.

The 1990s also saw the sale of XEDA-AM, then carrying rock music, to Radio S.A., which changed the format to talk. That same year also saw an alliance between MVS Radio and Imagen to operate their Mexico City stations: the group brought together Imagen's XELA-AM, XEDA-FM and XHDL-FM with MVS's XHMVS-FM 102.5 and XHMRD-FM 104.9. When this partnership ended in 2001, Imagen relaunched XEDA with a new news team. In 2002, Imagen dropped XELA's longtime classical format and flipped the station to sports as XEITE-AM (promptly selling it in August of that year), and 2004 saw Imagen drop XHDL's music format for the all-news "Reporte 98.5".

Grupo Imagen was bought by Grupo Empresarial Ángeles, owned by Olegario Vázquez Raña, in 2003 for US$50 million. Under GEA's ownership, Imagen grew into one of the largest media conglomerates in the country: it bought stations nationwide, began distributing its talk programming to interior Mexico, and made a move into television with the acquisition of XHRAE-TV channel 28 Mexico City. XHRAE was rebranded XHTRES "cadenatres". Also in 2006, Imagen bought the Excélsior newspaper for 585 million pesos and refreshed its branding.

== Radio ==
In Mexico City, Grupo Imagen owns XEDA-FM 90.5 Imagen Radio with a talk format. Both formats are carried on other stations, both owned and operated by Imagen and affiliates.

Two regional Mexican stations, branded as "La Caliente", and XHLTN-FM "Radio Latina" in Tijuana complete Imagen's radio portfolio.

== Television ==
Imagen operates channel XHTRES-TDT channel 27 in the Valley of Mexico, which from 2007 to 2015 was the flagship channel for the now defunct cadenatres network. It currently sports the all-news channel Excelsior TV (27.1) and a simulcast channel of the radio station Imagen Radio (27.2).

In 2015, Grupo Imagen won the IFT auction to build a new nationwide broadcast television network, which launched on October 17, 2016, under the Imagen Televisión name. Grupo Imagen will operate a network of 123 transmitters by 2020.

== Newspaper ==
The Excélsior newspaper, owned by Grupo Imagen, is the second-oldest in Mexico City and boasts nationwide circulation.

== Other holdings ==
In May 2014, Grupo Imagen bought Liga MX soccer club Querétaro FC out of government administration. This came after the previous owner of the team was investigated for bank fraud.

== Logos ==
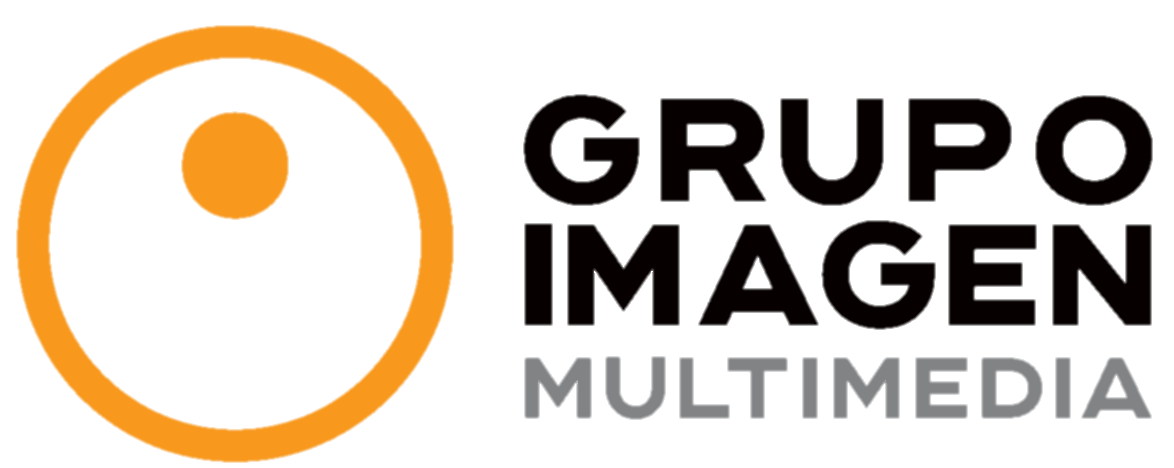
2010-2016

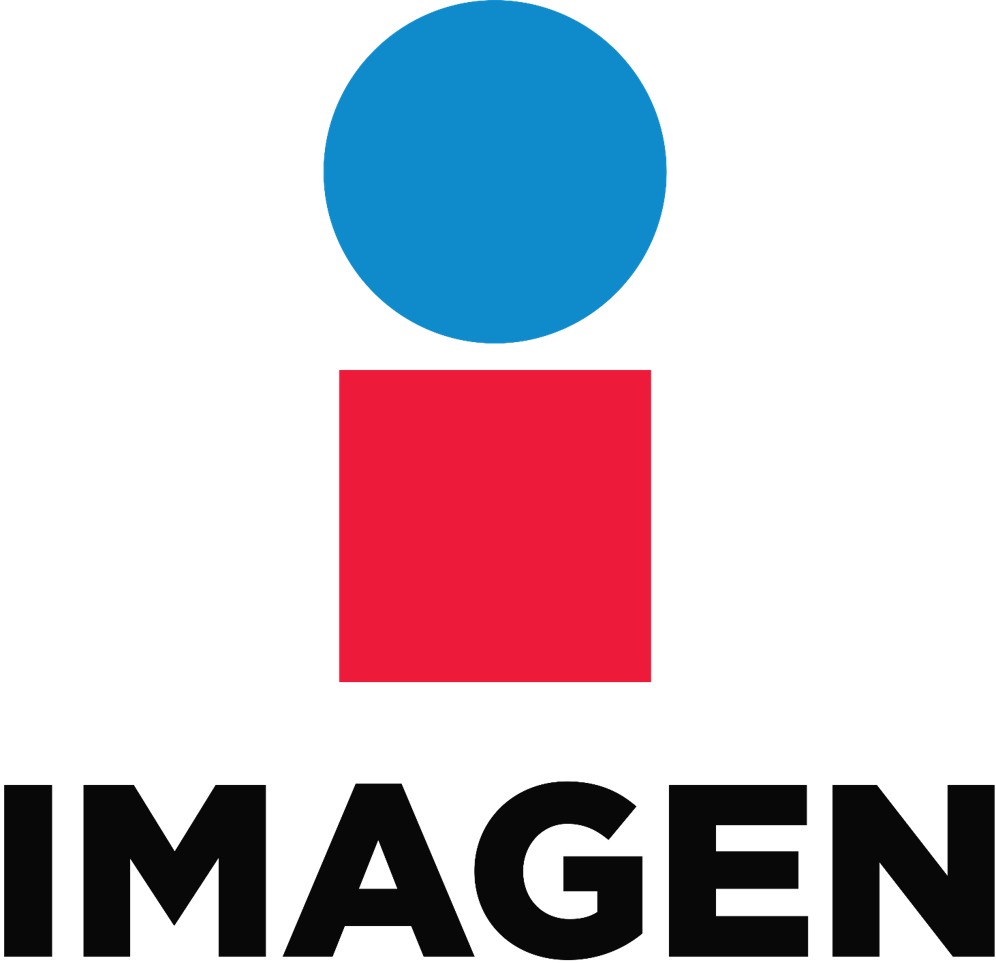
2016–present
