= Olegario Vázquez Raña =

Mexican sport shooter and businessman (1935–2025)

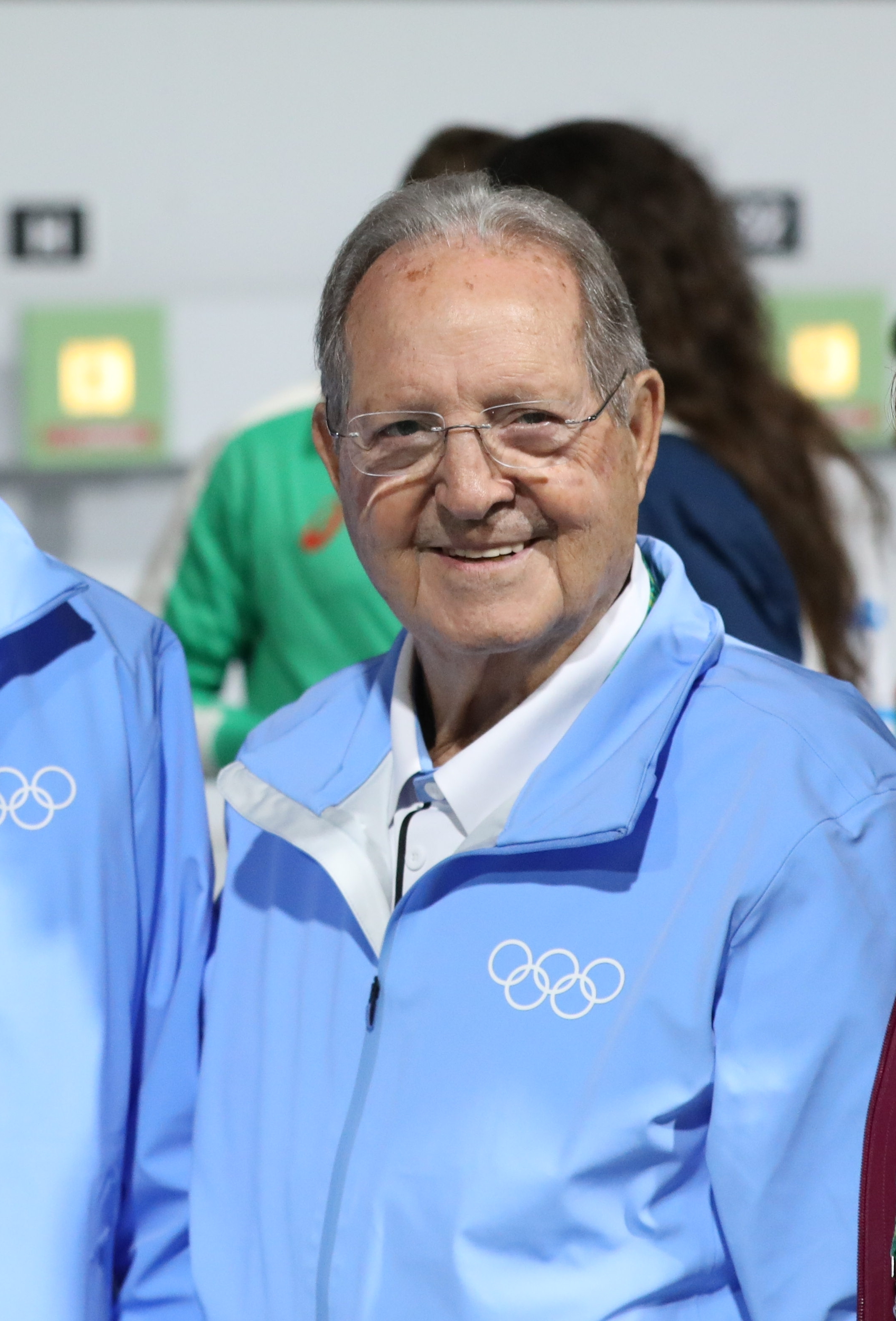
- Vázquez Raña at the shooting finals of the 2018 Summer Youth Olympics

Personal information
- Born: 10 December 1935 Ribadavia, Spain
- Died: 28 March 2025 (aged 89) Mexico City, Mexico

Sport
- Sport: Sports shooting

Olegario Vázquez Raña (10 December 1935 – 28 March 2025) was a Mexican sport shooter and businessman who was the owner of several companies and the chairman and principal shareholder of Grupo Empresarial Ángeles.

== Sports career ==
Vázquez Raña was a member of Mexico's shooting team at all Olympic Games from 1964 to 1976 and all world championships from 1966 to 1979. He was the national record-holder in many shooting disciplines and the world record-holder in air rifle (1973 and 1975).

== Sports administration ==
- President of the Mexican Shooting Federation (1975–1992)
- Lifelong Honorary President (1992–2025)
- Vice-President of the Mexican Sports Confederation (1983–1992)
- Permanent member of the National Olympic Committee (NOC) (1969–2025)
- President of the International Shooting Sport Federation (ISSF) (1980–2018)
- President of the Shooting Confederation of the Americas (1979–2025)
- Member of Association of Summer Olympic International Federations (ASOIF) Council (1987–2025)

== Personal life and death ==
Vázquez Raña was married to María de los Ángeles Aldir and he was the father of Olegario Vázquez Aldir, one of the richest businessmen in Mexico. His brother, Mario Vázquez Raña, was also involved in sport shooting and the Olympic movement.

Olegario Vázquez Raña died on 28 March 2025, at the age of 89.

Sporting positions
Preceded by George Vichos	ISSF President; 1980–2018	Succeeded by Vladimir Lisin
Preceded by	Mexican Shooting Federation President; 1975–1992	Succeeded by
