= List of radio stations in West Virginia =

The following is a list of FCC-licensed radio stations in the U.S. state of West Virginia, which can be sorted by their call signs, frequencies, cities of license, licensees, and programming formats.

== List of radio stations ==
Call sign	Frequency	City of License	Licensee	Format
WAEY	1490 AM	Princeton	Princeton Broadcasting, Inc.	Southern gospel
WAFD	100.3 FM	Webster Springs	Summit Media, Inc.	Hot adult contemporary
WAGE-LP	106.5 FM	Oak Hill	Southern Appalachian Labor School	Variety
WAJR	1440 AM	Morgantown	West Virginia Radio Corporation	News/Talk/Sports
WAMN	1050 AM	Green Valley	West Virginia – Virginia Media, LLC	Classic country
WAMX	106.3 FM	Milton	iHM Licenses, LLC	Classic rock
WASP-LP	104.5 FM	Huntington	Spring Valley High School (Students)	Variety
WAXE-LP	106.9 FM	St. Albans	Coal Mountain Broadcasting, Inc.	Classic Hits/Classic Rock
WAXS	94.1 FM	Oak Hill	Plateau Broadcasting, Inc.	Classic hits
WBBD	1400 AM	Wheeling	iHM Licenses, LLC	Sports (ESPN)
WBES	950 AM	Charleston	Bristol Broadcasting Company, Inc.	Sports (FSR)
WBGI-FM	105.5 FM	Bethlehem	Ohio Midland Newsgroup, LLC	Classic country
WBHZ	91.9 FM	Elkins	American Family Association	Religious
WBKW	1070 AM	Beckley	Southern Communications Corporation	Alternative
WBRB	101.3 FM	Buckhannon	West Virginia Radio Corporation of Buckhannon	Country
WBTQ	102.3 FM	Weston	AJG Corporation	Active rock (WCLG-FM)
WBUC	1460 AM	Buckhannon	AJG Corporation	News/Talk/Sports
WBWG-LP	99.1 FM	Idamay	God's Word Broadcasting, Inc.	Religious
WBWO-LP	102.9 FM	Moundsville	Grave Creek B'Nai Noach	Oldies
WBWV	88.7 FM	Beckley	Slingshot Broadcasting Corporation	Christian contemporary
WBYG	99.5 FM	Point Pleasant	Big River Radio, Inc.	Mainstream rock
WCBC-FM	107.1 FM	Keyser	Prosperitas Broadcasting System, LP	Classic hits
WCDE	89.9 FM	Elkins	Board of Trustees, Davis & Elkins College	Contemporary Christian
WCEF	98.3 FM	Ripley	Hometown Media, LLC	Country
WCHS	580 AM	Charleston	West Virginia Radio Corporation of Charleston	News/Talk/Sports
WCIR-FM	103.7 FM	Beckley	Southern Communications Corporation	Contemporary hit radio
WCLG-FM	100.1 FM	Morgantown	AJG Corporation	Active rock
WCST	1010 AM	Berkeley Springs	West Virginia Radio Corporation of the Alleghenies	News/Talk/Sports (WEPM)
WCST-FM	98.7 FM	Pocatalico	West Virginia Radio Corporation of Charleston	Classic rock
WCWV	92.9 FM	Summersville	Summit Media Broadcasting, LLC	Contemporary hit radio
WDBS	97.1 FM	Sutton	Summit Media Broadcasting, L.L.C.	Country
WDMT	106.3 FM	Marlinton	Pocahontas Communications Cooperative Corp.	Full service/Freeform
WDMX	100.1 FM	Vienna	iHM Licenses, LLC	Classic hits
WDNE	1240 AM	Elkins	West Virginia Radio Corporation of Elkins	Country
WDNE-FM	98.9 FM	Elkins	West Virginia Radio Corporation of Elkins	Country
WDTF-LP	107.9 FM	Berkeley Springs	Defenders of the Faith, Inc.	Catholic Religious
WDUQ-LP	99.1 FM	Benwood	Kol Ami Havurah	Classic Jazz/Blues
WDYK	100.5 FM	Ridgeley	West Virginia Radio Corporation of the Alleghenies	Adult contemporary
WEGW	107.5 FM	Wheeling	iHM Licenses, LLC	Classic rock
WEIR	1430 AM	Weirton	Ohio Midland Newsgroup, LLC	News/Talk/Sports
WEJP-LP	107.1 FM	Wheeling	Ohio Valley Peace	Community
WELC	1150 AM	Welch	First Media Services, LLC	Soft adult contemporary
WELD	690 AM	Fisher	Save Our Station, LLC	Classic hits
WELD-FM	101.7 FM	Moorefield	Save Our Station, LLC	Country/Bluegrass/Southern Gospel
WELK	94.7 FM	Elkins	West Virginia Radio Corporation of Elkins	Classic hits
WEMM-FM	107.9 FM	Huntington	Bristol Broadcasting Company, Inc.	Southern Gospel
WEPM	1340 AM	Martinsburg	West Virginia Radio Corporation of the Alleghenies	News/Talk/Sports
WETZ	1330 AM	New Martinsville	Dailey Corporation	Classic hits
WFBY	93.5 FM	Buckhannon	West Virginia Radio Corporation of Elkins	Classic rock
WFGH	90.7 FM	Fort Gay	Wayne County Board of Education	Variety
WFGM-FM	93.1 FM	Barrackville	AJG Corporation	Classic hits
WFSP	1560 AM	Kingwood	WFSP Radio, LLC	News/Talk
WFSP-FM	107.7 FM	Kingwood	WFSP Radio, LLC	Classic hits/Oldies
WGAG-LP	93.1 FM	Princeton	The Denver Foundation, Incorporated	Variety
WGGE	95.1 FM	Elizabeth	Burbach of DE, LLC	Country
WGIE	92.7 FM	Clarksburg	Vandalia Media Partners 2 LLC	Oldies
WGLZ	91.5 FM	West Liberty	West Liberty State College	Contemporary hit radio
WGYE	102.7 FM	Mannington	LHTC Media of West Virginia, Inc.	Conservative talk
WHAJ	104.5 FM	Bluefield	First Media Services, LLC	Contemporary hit radio
WHAW	980 AM	Lost Creek	Della Jane Woofter	Classic country
WHBR-FM	103.1 FM	Parkersburg	Burbach of DE, LLC	Active rock
WHFI	106.7 FM	Lindside	Monroe County Board of Education	Classic hits
WHIS	1440 AM	Bluefield	First Media Services, LLC	Talk
WHJC	1360 AM	Matewan	Coalfields Society Foundation Inc.	Southern gospel
WHMG-LP	98.7 FM	Purgitsville	Holy Spirit Study Institute, Ltd.	Catholic
WHQX	107.7 FM	Gary	First Media Services, LLC	Country
WHTI	105.7 FM	Salem	LHTC Media of West Virginia, Inc.	Conservative talk
WJAW	630 AM	St. Marys	Jawco, Inc.	Sports (ESPN)
WJJJ	88.1 FM	Beckley	Shofar Broadcasting Corporation	Religious
WJLS	560 AM	Beckley	West Virginia Radio Company of Raleigh, LLC	News/Talk/Classic Country
WJLS-FM	99.5 FM	Beckley	West Virginia Radio Company of Raleigh, LLC	Country
WJOE	103.9 FM	Vienna	Bouldin Radio, LLC	Southern gospel
WJYP	1300 AM	St. Albans	WKLC, Inc.	Sports (ISN)
WKAZ	680 AM	Charleston	West Virginia Radio Corporation of Charleston	Country
WKCJ	93.3 FM	White Sulphur Springs	Radio Greenbrier, LLC	Classic hits/Oldies
WKEE-FM	100.5 FM	Huntington	iHM Licenses, LLC	Contemporary hit radio
WKEZ	1240 AM	Bluefield	First Media Services, LLC	Soft adult contemporary
WKJL	88.1 FM	Clarksburg	Educational Media Foundation	Contemporary Christian
WKKW	97.9 FM	Fairmont	West Virginia Radio Corporation	Country
WKKX	1600 AM	Wheeling	RCK 1 Group, LLC	News/Talk/Sports
WKLC-FM	105.1 FM	St. Albans	WKLC, Inc.	Mainstream rock
WKLP	1390 AM	Keyser	Starcast Systems, Inc.	Sports (ESPN)
WKMM	96.7 FM	Kingwood	MarPat Corporation	Country
WKMZ	103.3 FM	Salem	West Virginia Radio Corporation of Salem	News/Talk/Sports
WKOY-FM	100.9 FM	Princeton	First Media Services, LLC	Classic rock
WKQR	92.7 FM	Mullens	First Media Services, LLC	Variety hits
WKQV	105.5 FM	Cowen	Summit Media Broadcasting, LLC	Classic rock
WKVW	93.3 FM	Marmet	Educational Media Foundation	Contemporary Christian
WKWK-FM	97.3 FM	Wheeling	iHM Licenses, LLC	Adult contemporary
WKWS	96.1 FM	Charleston	West Virginia Radio Corporation of Charleston	Classic Country
WKYW-LP	102.9 FM	Keyser	Mineral County Travel, Tourism, Convention and Visitors Bureau, Ltd.	Variety
WLKV	90.7 FM	Ripley	Educational Media Foundation	Contemporary Christian
WLOL-FM	89.7 FM	Star City	Light of Life Community, Inc.	Catholic Religious
WLTF	97.5 FM	Martinsburg	West Virginia Radio Corporation of the Alleghenies	Adult contemporary
WLUX	1450 AM	Dunbar	St. Paul Radio Co.	Catholic Religious
WLYQ	1050 AM	Parkersburg	Burbach of DE, LLC	Classic country
WMCC-LP	105.7 FM	Spencer	Radio 7 Company	Religious
WMGA	97.9 FM	Kenova	Fifth Avenue Broadcasting Company, Inc.	Classic hits/Oldies
WMLJ	90.5 FM	Summersville	Grace Missionary Baptist Church	Conservative Religious
WMOV	1360 AM	Ravenswood	Vandalia Media Partners, LLC	Talk/Sports
WMRE	1550 AM	Charles Town	iHM Licenses, LLC	Sports (FSR)
WMTD	1380 AM	Hinton	Mountainplex Media, LLC	Classic hits
WMTD-FM	102.3 FM	Hinton	Mountainplex Media II, LLC	Sports (ESPN)
WMUL	88.1 FM	Huntington	Marshall University Board of Governors	Variety
WMXE	100.9 FM	South Charleston	L.M. Communications of Kentucky, LLC	Classic hits
WNMP	88.5 FM	Marlinton	Pocahontas Communications Cooperative Corp.	Full service/Freeform
WNRJ	1200 AM	Huntington	Bristol Broadcasting Company, Inc.	Southern gospel
WNUX	89.7 FM	Montgomery	St. Paul Radio Co.	Catholic Religious
WOAY	860 AM	Oak Hill	Foothills Broadcasting, Inc.	Religious
WOTR	96.3 FM	Weston	Della Jane Woofter	Southern gospel/Positive Country
WOUX	105.3 FM	St. Mary's	St. Paul Radio Co.	Catholic Religious
WOVK	98.7 FM	Wheeling	iHM Licenses, LLC	Country
WPDX	1300 AM	Morgantown	AJG Corporation	Classic country
WPDX-FM	104.9 FM	Clarksburg	AJG Corporation	Classic country
WPHP	91.9 FM	Wheeling	Ohio County Board of Education	Contemporary hit radio
WPIB	91.1 FM	Bluefield	Positive Alternative Radio, Inc.	Christian adult contemporary
WPJW	91.5 FM	Hurricane	Positive Alternative Radio, Inc.	Christian adult contemporary
WPJY	88.7 FM	Blennerhassett	Positive Alternative Radio Inc.	Christian adult contemporary
WPKM-LP	96.3 FM	Parkersburg	West Virginia University at Parkersburg Journalism Department	Adult album alternative
WPWV	90.1 FM	Princeton	American Family Association	Religious
WQAZ-LP	98.5 FM	Edmond	Colby Foundation, Inc.	Variety
WQBE-FM	97.5 FM	Charleston	Bristol Broadcasting Company, Inc.	Country
WQWV	103.7 FM	Fisher	Save Our Station, LLC	Adult Hits
WQZK-FM	94.1 FM	Keyser	Starcast Systems, Inc.	Contemporary hit radio
WRLB	95.3 FM	Rainelle	Radio Greenbrier, LLC	Active rock
WRLF	1490 AM	Fairmont	LHTC Media of West Virginia, Inc.	Conservative talk
WRLF-FM	94.3 FM	Fairmont	LHTC Media of West Virginia, Inc.	Conservative talk
WRNR	740 AM	Martinsburg	Shenandoah Communications, Inc.	News/Talk/Sports
WRON	1400 AM	Ronceverte	Radio Greenbrier, LLC	News/Talk
WRON-FM	103.1 FM	Lewisburg	Radio Greenbrier, LLC	Country
WRQY	96.5 FM	Moundsville	Ohio Midland Newsgroup, LLC	Active rock
WRRL	1130 AM	Rainelle	Shilo Communications, Inc.	Classic rock
WRRR-FM	93.9 FM	St. Marys	Seven Ranges Radio Company, Inc.	Classic country
WRSG	91.5 FM	Middlebourne	Tyler County Board of Education	Variety
WRVC	930 AM	Huntington	Fifth Avenue Broadcasting Company, Inc.	Sports (ESPN)
WRVZ	107.3 FM	Miami	West Virginia Radio Corporation of Charleston	Rhythmic contemporary
WRZZ	106.1 FM	Parkersburg	Burbach of DE, LLC	Classic rock
WSCW	1410 AM	South Charleston	L.M. Communications of Kentucky, LLC	Americana/Folk
WSGB	1490 AM	Sutton	Summit Media Broadcasting, L.L.C.	Classic hits
WSHA	89.3 FM	South Charleston	Educational Media Foundation	Contemporary Christian
WSHC	89.7 FM	Shepherdstown	Shepherd College Board of Governors	Adult album alternative
WSJE	91.3 FM	Summersville	Evangelist Communications, Inc.	Catholic Religious
WSLW	1310 AM	White Sulphur Springs	Radio Greenbrier, LLC	News/Talk
WSTG	95.9 FM	Princeton	Princeton Broadcasting, Inc.	Hot adult contemporary
WSVQ-LP	92.1 FM	Charleston (West Side)	Partnership of African American Churches	Variety
WSWW	1490 AM	Charleston	West Virginia Radio Corporation of Charleston	Sports (ESPN)
WSWW-FM	95.7 FM	Craigsville	AJG Corporation	Country
WTCF	103.3 FM	Wardensville	Educational Media Foundation	Contemporary Christian
WTCR-FM	103.3 FM	Huntington	iHM Licenses, LLC	Country
WTHM-LP	92.5 FM	Ravenswood	Mountain State Community Radio, Inc.	Religious
WTHQ	1030 AM	Point Pleasant	Big River Radio, Inc.	Contemporary hit radio
WTNJ	105.9 FM	Mount Hope	West Virginia Broadcasting, Inc.	Country
WTSQ-LP	88.1 FM	Charleston	Masque Informed	Eclectic Freeform
WTUB-LP	106.7 FM	Lizemores	Clay County Services Unlimited, Inc	Variety
WULL-LP	104.3 FM	Ivydale	Ivydale Community Action Network, Inc.	Variety
WULV	88.7 FM	Moundsville	Educational Media Foundation	Contemporary Christian
WVAF	99.9 FM	Charleston	West Virginia Radio Corporation of Charleston	Adult contemporary
WVAM	1450 AM	Parkersburg	Mid Ohio Valley Radio Corporation	Oldies
WVAQ	101.9 FM	Morgantown	West Virginia Radio Corporation	Contemporary hit radio
WVAR	600 AM	Richwood	Summit Media, Inc.	Classic hits
WVBD	100.7 FM	Fayetteville	Summit Media South, Inc.	Classic country
WVBL	88.5 FM	Bluefield	West Virginia Educational Broadcasting Authority	Public radio
WVBY	91.7 FM	Beckley	West Virginia Educational Broadcasting Authority	Public radio
WVCU-LP	97.7 FM	Athens	Concord University	Variety
WVDS	89.5 FM	Petersburg	West Virginia Educational Broadcasting Authority	Public radio
WVEP	88.9 FM	Martinsburg	West Virginia Educational Broadcasting Authority	Public radio
WVGV	89.7 FM	West Union	Araiza Revival Ministries, Inc.	Religious
WVHU	800 AM	Huntington	iHM Licenses, LLC	News/Talk/Sports
WVHV-LP	98.5 FM	Harrisville	Ritchie Progress Alliance, Inc.	Variety
WVIW	104.1 FM	Bridgeport	VCY America, Inc.	Conservative Christian
WVKM	106.7 FM	Matewan	West Virginia Educational Broadcasting Authority	Public radio
WVLY	1370 AM	Moundsville	RCK 1 Group, LLC	News/Talk
WVMD	100.1 FM	Romney	West Virginia Radio Corporation of the Alleghenies	Country
WVMR	1370 AM	Frost	Pocahontas Communications Cooperative Corp.	Full service/Freeform
WVMR-FM	91.9 FM	Hillsboro	Pocahontas Communications Cooperative Corp.	Full service/Freeform
WVNP	89.9 FM	Wheeling	West Virginia Educational Broadcasting Authority	Public radio
WVNT	1230 AM	Parkersburg	Burbach of DE, LLC	Contemporary hit radio
WVOW	1290 AM	Logan	Logan Broadcasting Corporation	Full service
WVOW-FM	101.9 FM	Logan	Logan Broadcasting Corp.	Full service
WVPB	88.5 FM	Charleston	West Virginia Educational Broadcasting Authority	Public radio
WVPG	90.3 FM	Parkersburg	West Virginia Educational Broadcasting Authority	Public radio
WVPM	90.9 FM	Morgantown	West Virginia Educational Broadcasting Authority	Public radio
WVPW	88.9 FM	Buckhannon	West Virginia Educational Broadcasting Authority	Public radio
WVRC	1400 AM	Spencer	ASM Communications Inc.	Southern gospel
WVRC-FM	104.7 FM	Spencer	ASM Communications Inc.	Country
WVRR	88.1 FM	Point Pleasant	Positive Alternative Radio, Inc.	Christian adult contemporary
WVRW	107.7 FM	Glenville	Della Jane Woofter	Oldies
WVSR-FM	102.7 FM	Charleston	Bristol Broadcasting Company, Inc.	Contemporary hit radio
WVTS	1240 AM	Dunbar	Bristol Broadcasting Company, Inc.	News/Talk
WVUS	1190 AM	Grafton	Light of Life Community, Inc.	Catholic Religious
WVVV	96.9 FM	Williamstown	Seven Ranges Radio Co., Inc.	Adult contemporary
WVWC	92.1 FM	Buckhannon	West Virginia Wesleyan College	Adult contemporary
WVWP-LP	101.1 FM	Wayne	Wayne High School	Variety
WVWS	89.3 FM	Webster Springs	West Virginia Educational Broadcasting Authority	Public radio
WVWV	89.9 FM	Huntington	West Virginia Educational Broadcasting Authority	Public radio
WVXS	104.1 FM	Romney	South Branch Career and Technical Center	Classic rock
WWLW	106.5 FM	Clarksburg	West Virginia Radio Corporation of Clarksburg	Classic hits
WWNR	620 AM	Beckley	Southern Communications Corporation	News/Talk/Sports
WWSA-LP	96.9 FM	St. Albans	City of St. Albans	Oldies
WWVA	1170 AM	Wheeling	iHM Licenses, LLC	News/Talk
WWVU-FM	91.7 FM	Morgantown	West Virginia University Board of Governors	College
WWYO	970 AM	Pineville	Zack Media South LLC	Full service
WXAF	90.9 FM	Charleston	Shofar Broadcasting Corporation	Religious
WXCC	96.5 FM	Williamson	Mountain Top Media LLC	Country
WXCR	92.3 FM	New Martinsville	Seven Ranges Radio Company, Inc.	Classic rock
WXDC	92.9 FM	Berkeley Springs	West Virginia Radio Corporation of the Alleghenies	Classic hits
WXIL	99.1 FM	Parkersburg	Burbach of DE, LLC	Classic hits
WXTH-LP	101.7 FM	Richwood	Riverside Baptist Church	Religious
WYAP-LP	101.7 FM	Clay	Clay County Communications, Ltd.	Variety
WYKM	1250 AM	Rupert	Mt. State B. Co., Inc.	Country
WYMJ	99.5 FM	New Martinsville	Dailey Corporation	Country
WYMW	1110 AM	Hurricane	Positive Alternative Radio, Inc.	Catholic Religious
WYNL	94.5 FM	Dunbar	Bristol Broadcasting Company, Inc.	Contemporary Christian
WYRC-LP	92.3 FM	Spencer	Roane County Board of Education	Contemporary hit radio
WYXA	90.1 FM	Clarksburg	Educational Media Foundation	Contemporary Christian/Religious
WZAC-FM	92.5 FM	Danville	Price Broadcasting, LLC	Classic country
WZST	920 AM	Fairmont	LHTC Media of West Virginia, Inc.	Conservative talk
WZST-FM	100.9 FM	Westover	LHTC Media of West Virginia, Inc.	Conservative talk
WZUM-FM	88.1 FM	Bethany	Pittsburgh Public Media	Public radio/Jazz
WZWB	1420 AM	Kenova	iHM Licenses, LLC	Sports (FSR)
WZZW	1600 AM	Milton	Pure Media Ministries, Inc.	News/Talk

== Defunct ==
- WBTH
- WCFC
- WCFC-FM
- WHD
- WMBP-LP
- WMON
- WOBG
- WPDX
- WQAB
- WQTZ-LP
- WSPW-LP
- WVBL-LP
- WVPV-LP
- WXDB-LP
- WXKX

== See also ==
- West Virginia media
  - List of newspapers in West Virginia
  - List of television stations in West Virginia
  - Media of cities in West Virginia: Charleston, Huntington, Wheeling

== Bibliography ==
- Jack Alicoate, ed. (1939), "West Virginia", Radio Annual, New York: Radio Daily, OCLC 2459636 – via Internet Archive
- "AM Stations in the U.S.: West Virginia", Radio Annual Television Year Book, New York: Radio Television Daily, 1963, OCLC 10512375 – via Internet Archive

== Images ==
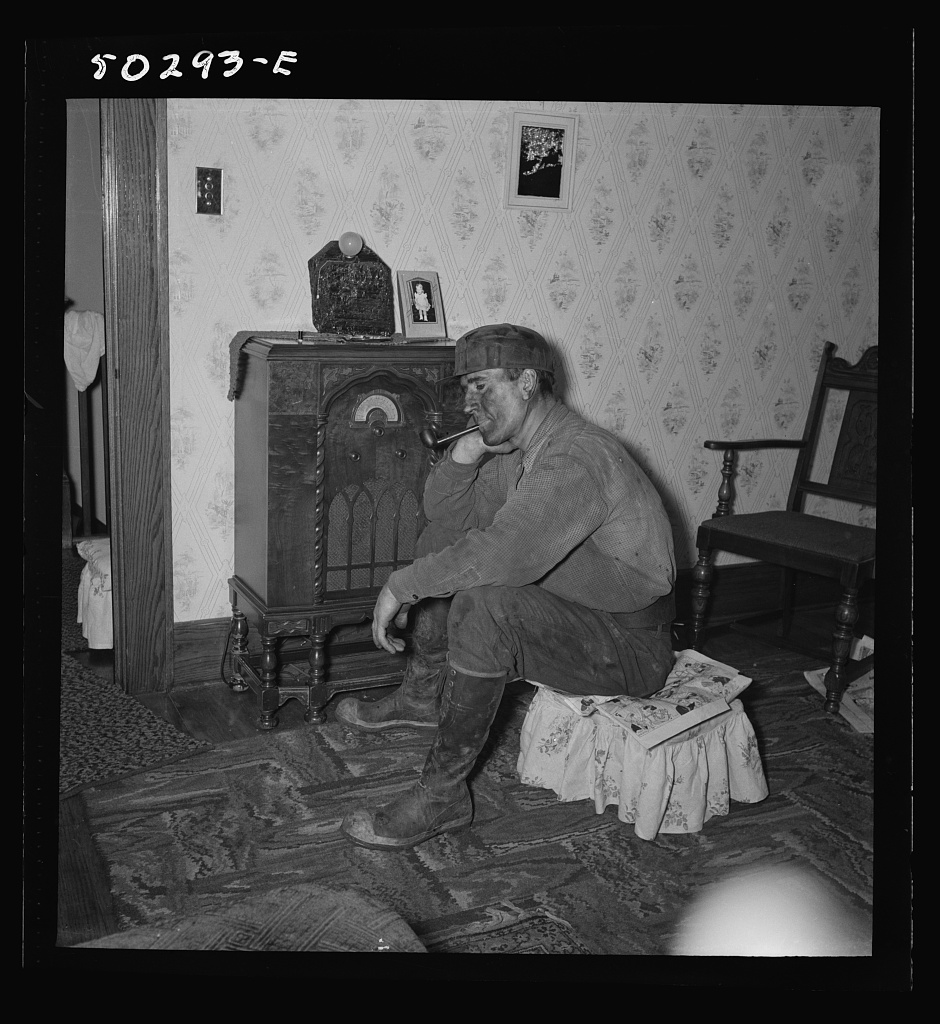
Radio listener in Westover, West Virginia, 1938

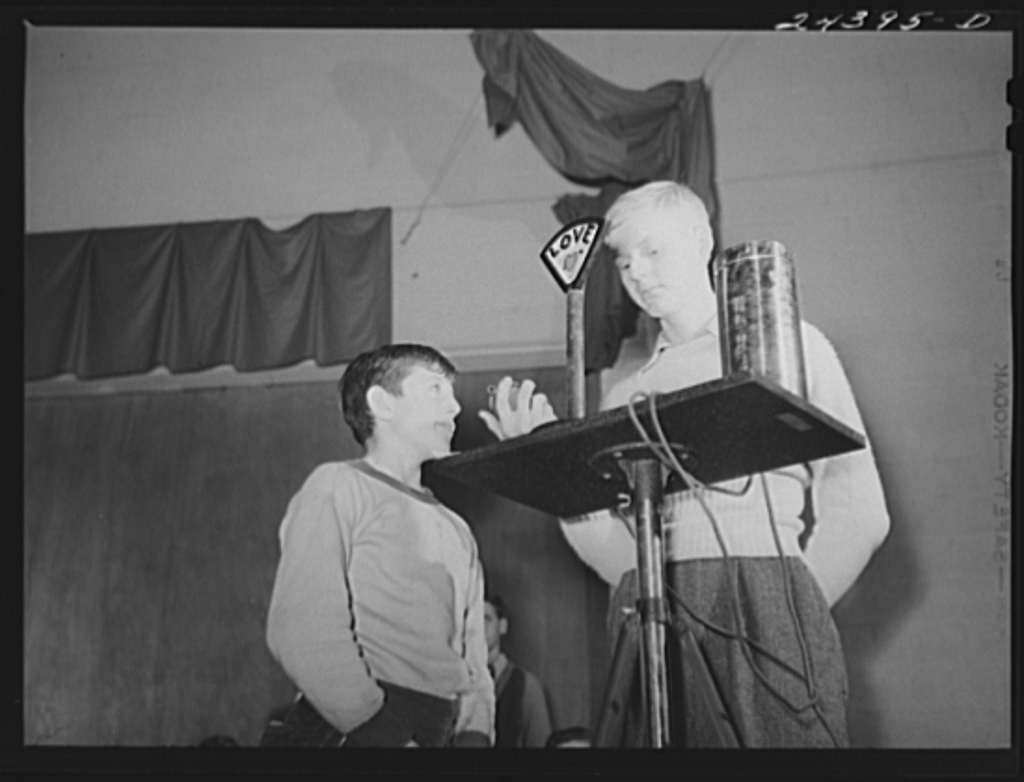
LOVE radio quiz, West Virginia, 1941

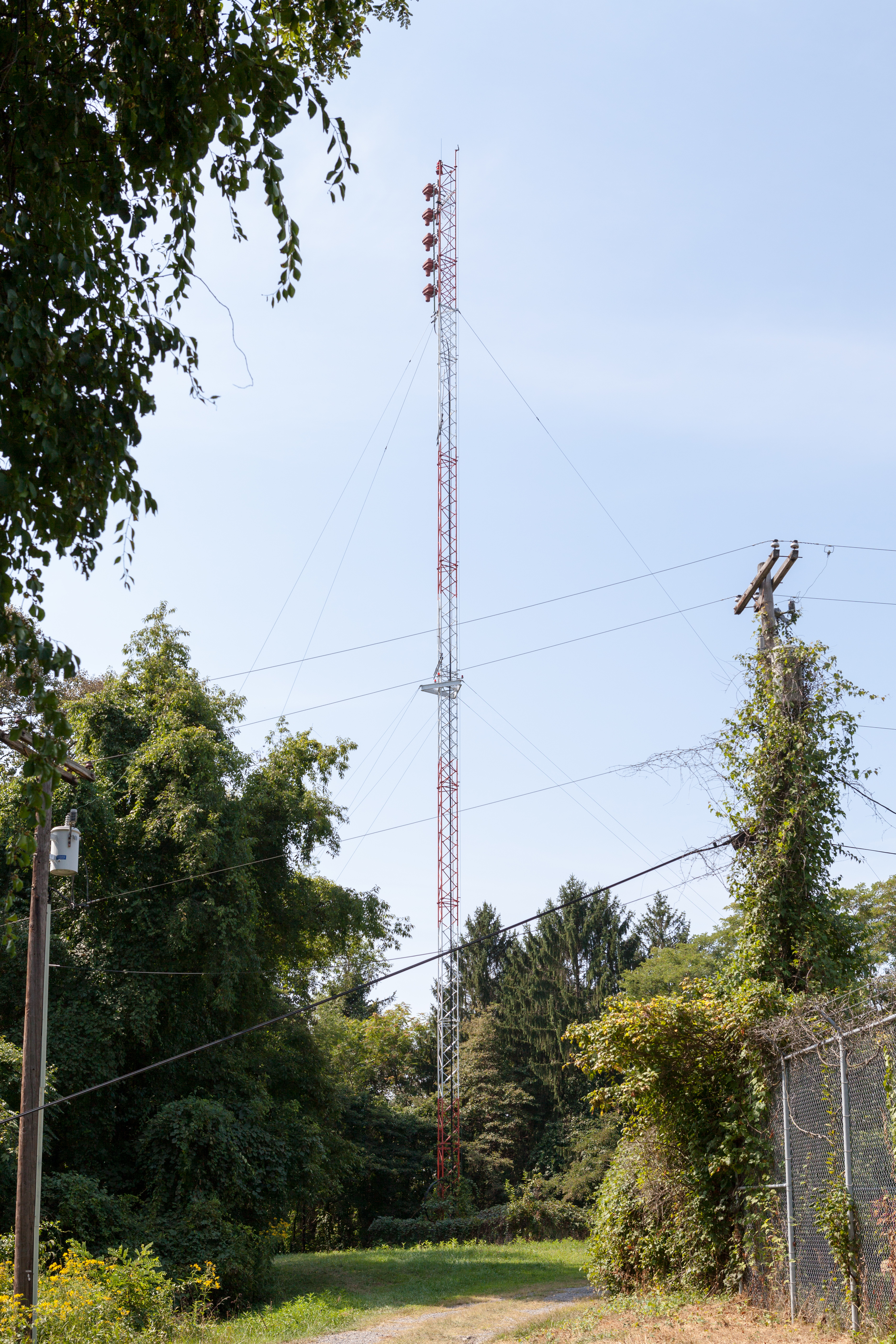
WWVU-FM antenna, Morgantown, West Virginia, 2015
