= WPDX =

WPDX may refer to:

- WPDX (AM), a radio station (1300 AM) licensed to serve Morgantown, West Virginia, United States
- WPDX-FM, a radio station (104.9 FM) licensed to serve Clarksburg, West Virginia
- WPDX (Clarksburg, West Virginia), a defunct radio station (750 AM) formerly licensed to serve Clarksburg
