= WFGM =

WFGM may refer to:

- WFGM-FM, a radio station (93.1 FM) licensed to Barrackville, West Virginia, United States
- WPDX (AM), a radio station (1300 AM) licensed to Morgantown, West Virginia, which held the call sign WFGM from 2019 to 2023
- WFGL (AM), a radio station (960 AM) licensed to Fitchburg, Massachusetts, United States, which held the call sign WFGM from 1950 to 1967.
- WKKW, a radio station (97.9 FM) licensed to Fairmont, West Virginia, United States, which held the call sign WFGM from 1975 to 1996.
- Women's Foundation for Greater Memphis, an organization in Memphis, Tennessee, United States
