= West Virginia MetroNews =

American radio network

- Type: Radio Network
- Branding: "The Voice of West Virginia"
- Availability: Only in West Virginia
- Owner: West Virginia Radio Corporation
- Official website: Official website

West Virginia MetroNews is a radio network heard on many radio stations throughout the State of West Virginia. The network is owned by the West Virginia Radio Corporation. West Virginia MetroNews offers a mix of news and talk. It held the rights to live play-by-play coverage of West Virginia University Mountaineers sports games, which it marketed under the DBA name "Mountaineer Sports Network", but lost these rights following the end of the 2012/13 basketball season. The network also provides coverage of select high school football and basketball games that happen in West Virginia.

== Availability ==
The network is carried on all West Virginia Radio Corporation owned stations, and is syndicated to stations in markets where WVRC does not do business. Within a radio market, there is generally only one or two West Virginia MetroNews affiliates, which are almost always owned by the same company due to market exclusivity.

== Programming ==
=== News ===
The company produces a traditional local news and weather update, designed to follow a national update, at the "top of the hour" for stations following a "full-service" format.

=== Morning News ===
"The Morning News" is all news program that updates the news of West Virginia, along with statewide weather and sports on a 22-minute cycle. The show is hosted by anchors Chris Lawrence and Jennifer Smith. This runs from 6-9 AM on weekdays.

=== Talkline ===
"Talkline" is a two-hour-long call in show featuring host Hoppy Kercheval, who generally takes a moderate to conservative take on most issues. The show features local, state, and national guests along taking questions from callers throughout the state of West Virginia. This show runs from 10 to 12 weekdays.

=== Hotline ===
Hotline is a mixed sports and general entertainment lifestyle discussion show hosted by Dave Weekley. The program runs from 3-6 weekdays.

=== Sportsline ===
Sportsline is a one-hour-long weeknight program and a two-hour Sunday program that primarily discuses West Virginia University sports. The program is hosted by Tony Caridi and Travis Jones. It currently runs from 6-7 weekdays, and 6–8 on Sundays.

=== WV Outdoors ===
"WV Outdoors" is an outdoors program that focuses on fishing and hunting, though does delve into other sport topics. The show is hosted by Chris Lawrence and runs 1 hour, from 7 to 8 on Saturday mornings.

=== High School Game Night ===
"High School Game Night" is a Wednesday and Friday 3 and 1/2 hour program that features live scores, interviews, and analysis of all the high school football games in progress throughout the state of West Virginia. The show is hosted by Fred Persinger and Dave Jecklin. The company also owns the rights to the WVSSAC playoffs.

=== Outdoors Today ===
"Outdoors Today" is a two-minute weekday report on the goings-on in West Virginia outdoors. The segment is hosted by WV Outdoors host Chris Lawrence.

=== High school basketball ===
West Virginia MetroNews carries live coverage of select basketball games throughout the state of West Virginia, and holds the rights to the WVSSAC Tournaments.

=== Other ventures ===
The company formerly used the DBA "Mountaineer Sports Network" as the syndicator of WVU sports, but lost the rights following the 2013 basketball season and has dissolved the operation. In the early 1990s it also briefly held rights to Virginia Tech and Marshall sports.

The company's television division produces and syndicates WVSSAC football and basketball tournament games, and previously syndicated WVU women's basketball games.

== Affiliates ==
West Virginia MetroNews programs are carried on 57 different radio stations throughout the state of West Virginia, two stations in Kentucky, one station in Ohio, and one station in Virginia.

- WAJR - Morgantown, West Virginia
- WBRB - Buckhannon, West Virginia
- WBTQ - Weston, West Virginia
- WCEF - Ripley, West Virginia
- WCHS - Charleston, West Virginia
- WCMI-FM - Catlettsburg, Kentucky (Note: Serves the Huntington Metro area.)
- WCST - Berkeley Springs, West Virginia
- WDBS - Sutton, West Virginia
- WDGG - Ashland, Kentucky
- WDMX - Vienna, West Virginia
- WDNE - Elkins, West Virginia
- WDNE-FM - Elkins, West Virginia
- WEIR - Weirton, West Virginia
- WELC - Welch, West Virginia
- WEPM - Martinsburg, West Virginia
- WETZ - New Martinsville, West Virginia
- WFSP - Kingwood, West Virginia
- WFSP-FM - Kingwood, West Virginia
- WHAJ - Bluefield, West Virginia
- WHIS - Bluefield, West Virginia
- WJLS-FM - Beckley, West Virginia
- WKAZ - Charleston, West Virginia
- WKLP - Keyser, West Virginia
- WKMZ - Salem, West Virginia
- WKQB - Welch, West Virginia
- WKQR - Mullens, West Virginia
- WKQV - Cowen, West Virginia
- WKWS - Charleston, West Virginia
- WLTF - Martinsburg, West Virginia
- WMOV - Ravenswood, West Virginia
- WMRE - Charles Town, West Virginia
- WNUS - Belpre, Ohio (Note: Serves the Parkersburg Metro area.)
- WQWV - Fisher, West Virginia
- WQZK-FM - Keyser, West Virginia
- WRLF - Fairmont, West Virginia
- WRLF-FM - Fairmont, West Virginia
- WRON - Ronceverte, West Virginia
- WRON-FM - Lewisburg, West Virginia
- WRRL - Rainelle, West Virginia
- WRVC - Huntington, West Virginia
- WRVZ - Miami, West Virginia
- WSGB - Sutton, West Virginia
- WSWW - Charleston, West Virginia
- WSWW-FM - Craigsville, West Virginia
- WTZE - Tazewell, Virginia (Note: Serves the Bluefield Metro area.)
- WVAM - Parkersburg, West Virginia
- WVAQ - Morgantown, West Virginia
- WVAR - Richwood, West Virginia
- WVLY - Moundsville, West Virginia
- WVMR - Frost, West Virginia
- WVOW - Logan, West Virginia
- WVOW-FM - Logan, West Virginia
- WVRC - Spencer, West Virginia
- WVRC-FM - Spencer, West Virginia
- WXDC - Berkeley Springs, West Virginia
- WYKM - Rupert, West Virginia
- WZAC-FM - Madison, West Virginia
- WZST - Fairmont, West Virginia
