= WCLG =

WCLG may refer to:

- WCLG-FM, a radio station (100.1 FM) licensed to serve Morgantown, West Virginia, United States
- WPDX (AM), a radio station (1300 AM) licensed to serve Morgantown, which held the call sign WCLG from 1954 to 2019 and in 2023

== See also ==
- KCLG (disambiguation)
- CLG (disambiguation)
