= WAJR =

WAJR may refer to:

- WAJR (AM), a radio station (1440 AM) licensed to Morgantown, West Virginia, United States
- WKMZ (FM), a radio station (103.3 FM) licensed to Salem, West Virginia, which held the call sign WAJR-FM from 1998 to 2020
