= WMTD =

WMTD can refer to:

- WMTD (AM), a radio station broadcasting at 1380 kHz on the AM band, licensed to Hinton, West Virginia
- WMTD-FM, a radio station broadcasting at 102.3 MHz on the FM band, licensed to Hinton, West Virginia
