= WFSP =

WFSP can refer to:

- WFSP (AM), a radio station at 1560 AM located in Kingwood, West Virginia
- WFSP-FM, a radio station at 107.7 FM located in Kingwood, West Virginia
