= WVOW =

WVOW could refer to:

- WVOW (AM), a radio station (1290 AM) licensed to Logan, West Virginia, United States
- WVOW-FM, a radio station (101.9 FM) licensed to Logan, West Virginia, United States
