= WBRB =

- Buckhannon, West Virginia; United States
- Broadcast area: North Central West Virginia
- Frequency: 101.3 MHz
- Branding: 101.3 The Bear

Programming
- Format: Country
- Affiliations: Premiere Networks; West Virginia MetroNews

Ownership
- Owner: WVRC Media; (West Virginia Radio Corporation of Buckhannon)
- Sister stations: WAJR, WBTQ, WDNE, WDNE-FM, WELK, WFBY, WFGM, WKKW, WKMZ, WVAQ, WWLW

History
- First air date: June 16, 1990
- Former call signs: WUBI (1988–1989); WBUC-FM (1989–1997); WBRB (1997–Present)
- Call sign meaning: Bear Buckhannon

Technical information
- Licensing authority: FCC
- Facility ID: 9302
- Class: B
- ERP: 50,000 watts
- HAAT: 150 meters (490 ft)
- Transmitter coordinates: 38°56′40.0″N 80°10′46.0″W

Links
- Public license information: Public file; LMS
- Webcast: Listen Live
- Website: 1013thebear.com

WBRB (101.3 FM) is a country music-formatted radio station licensed to Buckhannon, West Virginia, serving North Central West Virginia. WBRB is owned and operated by WVRC Media.
