= WFBY =

- Buckhannon, West Virginia; United States
- Broadcast area: Bridgeport, West Virginia; Elkins, West Virginia; Philippi, West Virginia; Weston, West Virginia; Clarksburg, West Virginia
- Frequency: 93.5 MHz
- Branding: The FBY

Programming
- Format: Classic rock
- Affiliations: Premiere Networks; Westwood One

Ownership
- Owner: WVRC Media; (West Virginia Radio Corporation of Elkins)
- Sister stations: WAJR, WBRB, WBTQ, WDNE, WDNE-FM, WELK, WFGM-FM, WKKW, WKMZ, WVAQ, WWLW

History
- First air date: 1984 (as WBTQ)
- Former call signs: WBTQ (1984–2018)
- Call sign meaning: The FBI reference to the FBI complex in Clarksburg

Technical information
- Licensing authority: FCC
- Facility ID: 26143
- Class: B1
- ERP: 16,000 watts
- HAAT: 127 meters (417 ft)
- Transmitter coordinates: 38°58′11.0″N 80°1′58.0″W

Links
- Public license information: Public file; LMS
- Webcast: Listen Live
- Website: wfby.com

WFBY (93.5 FM) is a classic rock formatted broadcast radio station licensed to Buckhannon, West Virginia, serving Bridgeport, Elkins, Philippi, and Weston in West Virginia. WFBY is owned and operated by WVRC Media.

On January 31, 2018, the then-WBTQ changed their call letters to WFBY and changed their format to classic rock, branded as "The FBY" (format moved from WFBY 102.3 FM Weston, which switched to a simulcast of rock-formatted WCLG-FM 100.1 FM Morgantown under the WBTQ calls).
