= WDNE =

WDNE can refer to:

- WDNE (AM), a radio station (1240 AM) licensed to Elkins, West Virginia
- WDNE-FM, a radio station (98.9 FM) licensed to Elkins, West Virginia
