= WWLW =

- Clarksburg, West Virginia; United States
- Broadcast area: North Central West Virginia
- Frequency: 106.5 MHz
- Branding: Sky 106.5

Programming
- Format: Classic hits
- Affiliations: Premiere Networks

Ownership
- Owner: WVRC Media; (West Virginia Radio Corporation of Clarksburg)
- Sister stations: WAJR, WBRB, WBTQ, WDNE, WELK,WDNE-FM, WFBY, WFGM-FM, WKKW, WKMZ, WVAQ

History
- First air date: 1973 (as WRGT-FM)
- Former call signs: WRGT-FM (1973–1985); WKKW-FM (1985–1996); WFBY (1996–2002); WWLW (2002–Present)

Technical information
- Licensing authority: FCC
- Facility ID: 74163
- Class: B
- ERP: 28,000 watts
- HAAT: 199 meters (653 ft)
- Transmitter coordinates: 39°15′44.0″N 80°28′1.0″W

Links
- Public license information: Public file; LMS
- Webcast: Listen Live
- Website: sky1065.com

WWLW (106.5 FM) is a classic hits formatted broadcast radio station licensed to Clarksburg, West Virginia, serving North Central West Virginia. WWLW is owned and operated by WVRC Media.
