= WVRC Media =

American radio broadcasting company

- Logo as The West Virginia Radio Corporation
- Type: Privately owned
- Industry: Radio broadcasting
- Genre: Media corporation
- Founded: December 7, 1940; 85 years ago in Morgantown, West Virginia
- Founder: Agnes and Herbert Greer
- Headquarters: Morgantown, West Virginia, United States
- Area served: West Virginia; Maryland (limited); Virginia (limited)
- Total assets: 11 AM stations; 23 FM stations
- Owner: Greer Industries, Inc.
- Website: Official website

WVRC Media is a media corporation comprising radio stations and two radio networks based in the state of West Virginia. The company was known as the West Virginia Radio Corporation prior to a December 2021 rebranding.

The company is controlled by Greer Industries and its owners, the Raese family.

It was founded by Herbert and Agnes Greer, who signed on WAJR in 1940. Since 1972, John Raese and his two brothers have controlled the company; they are Herbert and Agnes' grandsons.

== Radio markets ==
WVRC Media owns stations in eight separate areas in the state of West Virginia:

- Charleston
- Morgantown-Clarksburg-Fairmont
- Elkins-Buckhannon-Weston
- Cumberland-Keyser
- Beckley
- Martinsburg
- Berkeley Springs
- Summersville

== West Virginia MetroNews ==
WVRC Media owns and operates the West Virginia MetroNews Network. The network features 63 affiliates covering all 55 counties in West Virginia.

== Stations owned by WVRC Media ==
=== Charleston ===
Callsign	Frequency	Band	Format
WCHS	580	AM	Talk radio
WKAZ	680	AM	Country music
WSWW	1490	AM	Sports (ESPN Radio)
W237AZ	95.3	FM	WKAZ relay
WKWS	96.1	FM	Classic country
W243DR	96.5	FM	WCHS relay
WCST-FM	98.7	FM	Classic rock
WVAF	99.9	FM	Adult contemporary
W283AQ	106.7	FM	WSWW relay
WRVZ	107.3	FM	Rhythmic contemporary

=== Morgantown-Clarksburg-Fairmont ===
Callsign	Frequency	Band	Format
WPDX	1300	AM	Classic Country (WPDX -FM)
WAJR	1440	AM	Talk radio
W221DR	92.1	FM	WPDX relay
WFGM-FM	93.1	FM	Classic Hits
WKKW	97.9	FM	Country music
WCLG-FM	100.1	FM	Active rock
WVAQ	101.9	FM	Contemporary hit radio
WKMZ	103.3	FM	Talk radio
W283CR	104.5	FM	WAJR relay
WWLW	106.5	FM	Classic hits
WPDX-FM	104.9	FM	Classic Country

=== Elkins-Buckhannon-Weston ===
Callsign	Frequency	Band	Format
WDNE	1240	AM	Country music (WDNE-FM)
WBUC	1460	AM	Classic Country (WPDX-FM)
WFBY	93.5	FM	Classic rock
WELK	94.7	FM	Classic hits
WDNE-FM	98.9	FM	Country music
W260DG	99.9	FM	WDNE relay
WBRB	101.3	FM	Country music
WBTQ	102.3	FM	Active rock (WCLG-FM)

=== Keyser-Cumberland ===
Callsign	Frequency	Band	Format
WCMD	1230	AM	Talk radio/sports
WKLP	1390	AM	Sports (ESPN Radio)
WQZK-FM	94.1	FM	Contemporary hit radio
WDZN	99.5	FM	Active Rock
WVMD	100.1	FM	Country music
WDYK	100.5	FM	Adult contemporary
W271AT	102.1	FM	WCMD relay

=== Beckley-Oak Hill ===
Callsign	Frequency	Band	Format
WJLS	560	AM	Talk radio/country
WJLS-FM	99.5	FM	Country music
W281AJ	104.1	FM	WJLS relay

=== Martinsburg ===
Callsign	Frequency	Band	Format
WEPM	1340	AM	Talk radio/sports
W229CM	93.7	FM	WEPM relay
WICL	95.9	FM	Classic country
WLTF	97.5	FM	Adult contemporary

=== Berkeley Springs ===
Callsign	Frequency	Band	Format
WCST	1010	AM	Talk radio/sports (WEPM)
WXDC	92.9	FM	Classic Hits
W228DU	93.5	FM	WCST relay

=== Summersville ===
Callsign	Frequency	Band	Format
WSWW-FM	95.7	FM	Country
