= WHNK =

WHNK may refer to:

- WHNK (AM), a radio station (1330 AM) licensed to serve Marion, Virginia, United States
- WVAM, a radio station (1450 AM) licensed to serve Parkersburg, Virginia, which held the call sign WHNK from 2004 to 2020
