= WLOL =

WLOL may refer to:

- WLOL (AM), a radio station (1330 AM) licensed to Minneapolis, Minnesota, United States
- WLOL-FM, a radio station (89.7 FM) licensed to Morgantown, West Virginia, United States
- KSJN, a radio station (99.5 FM) licensed to Minneapolis, Minnesota, United States, which held the call sign WLOL-FM from 1957 to 1991
- World List of Lights, database of lighthouses
- Women's Loyal Orange Lodge, Protestant female organization of the Orange Order
