= WTBZ =

WTBZ may refer to:

- WTBZ-LD, a low-power television station (channel 14) licensed to serve Gainesville, Florida, United States; see List of television stations in Florida
- WVUS, a radio station (1190 AM) licensed to serve Grafton, West Virginia, United States, which held the call sign WTBZ from 1986 to 2008
