= WHD =

WHD may refer to:

== Observances ==
- World Health Day, a public health education day designated by the World Health Organization.
- World Humanitarian Day, a day designated by the United Nation.
- World Hypertension Day, a public health education day was initiated to increase the awareness of hypertension.

== Other uses ==
- Wafer Handling Diffusion, a machine used to load/unload solar wafers into/from a diffusion furnace.
- Wage and Hour Division, a division of the United States Department of Labor.
- Werdnig–Hoffmann disease, an infantile-onset type of spinal muscular atrophy.
- West Hampstead railway station, London, National Rail station code.
- WHD-TV, a defunct Washington. D.C. experimental digital television station, that was active from 1996 until 1999.
- WHD (AM), a defunct Morgantown, West Virginia radio station, licensed from 1922 until 1923.
