= WLTP =

WLTP may refer to:

- Worldwide Harmonised Light Vehicles Test Procedure, known as the WLTP procedure, a global standard for measuring vehicles' emissions of pollutants
- WLTP (AM), a radio station (910 AM) licensed to Marietta, Ohio, United States
- WVAM, a radio station (1450 AM) licensed to serve Parkersburg, West Virginia, United States, which held the call sign WLTP from 1984 to 2004
