= KCLG =

KCLG may refer to:

- KCLG-LD, a defunct low-power TV station formerly licensed to serve Neosho, Missouri, USA
- KCLG-FM, the former callsign for St. George, Utah, USA station 99.9FM KONY

== See also ==
- CLG (disambiguation)
- WCLG (disambiguation)
