= WDNE-FM =

- Elkins, West Virginia; United States
- Broadcast area: North Central West Virginia
- Frequency: 98.9 MHz
- Branding: 98.9 WDNE

Programming
- Format: Country music
- Affiliations: ABC Radio; ABC Radio News; West Virginia MetroNews

Ownership
- Owner: WVRC Media; (West Virginia Radio Corporation of Elkins)
- Sister stations: WAJR, WBRB, WBTQ, WDNE, WELK, WFBY, WFGM-FM, WKKW, WKMZ, WVAQ, WWLW

History
- First air date: June 15, 1985
- Former call signs: WDNE-FM (1983–1984); WVHT (1984–1989)
- Call sign meaning: Davis and Elkins, as in Davis & Elkins College

Technical information
- Licensing authority: FCC
- Facility ID: 65939
- Class: B1
- ERP: 5,100 watts
- HAAT: 221 meters (725 ft)
- Transmitter coordinates: 38°54′36.0″N 79°47′18.0″W

Links
- Public license information: Public file; LMS
- Webcast: Listen Live
- Website: wdnefm.com

WDNE-FM (98.9 MHz) is a country music formatted broadcast radio station licensed to Elkins, West Virginia, serving North Central West Virginia. WDNE-FM is owned and operated by WVRC Media.
