= WELK =

- Elkins, West Virginia; United States
- Broadcast area: North Central West Virginia
- Frequency: 94.7 MHz
- Branding: 94.7 WELK

Programming
- Format: Classic hits

Ownership
- Owner: WVRC Media; (West Virginia Radio Corporation of Elkins)
- Sister stations: WAJR, WBRB, WDNE, WDNE-FM, WFBY, WFGM-FM, WKKW, WKMZ, WVAQ, WWLW

History
- First air date: October 17, 1982
- Call sign meaning: Elkins

Technical information
- Licensing authority: FCC
- Facility ID: 19369
- Class: B1
- ERP: 5,000 watts
- HAAT: 222 meters (728 ft)
- Transmitter coordinates: 38°54′43.0″N 79°47′19.0″W

Links
- Public license information: Public file; LMS
- Webcast: Listen Live
- Website: 947welk.com

WELK (94.7 FM) is a classic hits formatted broadcast radio station licensed to Elkins, West Virginia, United States, serving North Central West Virginia. WELK is owned and operated by WVRC Media.
