= WAJR (AM) =

- Morgantown, West Virginia; United States
- Broadcast area: North Central West Virginia
- Frequency: 1440 kHz
- Branding: Full Service 1440 WAJR

Programming
- Format: News/talk/sports
- Affiliations: Fox News Radio; Premiere Networks; Westwood One; Pittsburgh Pirates Radio Network; West Virginia MetroNews

Ownership
- Owner: WVRC Media
- Sister stations: WBRB, WBTQ, WDNE, WDNE-FM, WELK, WFBY, WFGM-FM, WKKW, WKMZ, WVAQ, WWLW

History
- First air date: December 7, 1940
- Former call signs: WAJR (1940–Present)
- Call sign meaning: W Agnes J. Reeves Greer former owner

Technical information
- Licensing authority: FCC
- Facility ID: 71671
- Class: B
- Power: 5,000 watts day 500 watts night
- Transmitter coordinates: 39°40′34.0″N 80°0′12.0″W
- Translator: 104.5 W283CR (Morgantown)
- Repeater: 101.9 WVAQ-HD2 (Morgantown)

Links
- Public license information: Public file; LMS
- Webcast: Listen Live
- Website: wajr.com

WAJR (1440 kHz) is a news/talk/sports formatted broadcast radio station licensed to Morgantown, West Virginia, serving North Central West Virginia. WAJR is owned and operated by WVRC Media.

WAJR was the flagship station for West Virginia Mountaineers football and basketball for many decades until 2013. On July 1st, 2026, WVU football and basketball returned to the station after a 13-year absence.

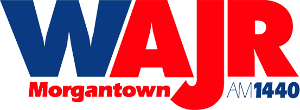
Logo before translator sign on

== FM Translator ==
In addition to the main station at 1440 kHz, WAJR is relayed by an FM translator to widen its broadcast area, especially at night when the AM station reduces power to 500 watts. Translator W283CR is owned by Morgantown, West Virginia-based WVRC Media .

Broadcast translator for WAJR
Call sign	Frequency	City of license	FID	ERP (W)	Class	FCC info
W283CR	104.5 FM	Morgantown, West Virginia	143294	250	D	LMS
