= WPDX (Clarksburg, West Virginia) =

Coordinates: 39°14′40″N 80°23′05″W

- Clarksburg, West Virginia; United States
- Broadcast area: Clarksburg, West Virginia; Fairmont, West Virginia; Buckhannon, West Virginia
- Frequency: 750 kHz
- Branding: 104.9 WPDX

Programming
- Format: Defunct (was Classic Country)

Ownership
- Owner: West Virginia Radio Corporation; (AJG Corporation)
- Sister stations: WPDX-FM

History
- First air date: 1947

Technical information
- Facility ID: 68302
- Class: D
- Power: 1,000 watts daytime only

WPDX (750 kHz) was a Classic Country formatted broadcast radio station licensed to Clarksburg, West Virginia, serving the Clarksburg/Fairmont/Buckhannon area. WPDX was last owned by West Virginia Radio Corporation and last operated under their AJG Corporation licensee.

Because it shared the same frequency as "clear channel" station WSB in Atlanta, Georgia, WPDX operated only during daytime hours.

== History ==
WPDX began broadcasting August 17, 1947. The station was licensed to the Clarksburg Broadcasting Corporation and was located at 339 West Main Street in Clarksburg.

On October 13, 2008, WPDX flipped from Adult Standards to Classic Country simulcasting sister station WPDX-FM.

Previous logo

AJG Corporation surrendered WPDX's license to the Federal Communications Commission on December 9, 2021, which cancelled it the same day.
