= WKMZ (FM) =

- Salem, West Virginia; United States
- Broadcast area: Clarksburg, West Virginia; Weston, West Virginia
- Frequency: 103.3 MHz
- Branding: Talk Radio 103.3 WKMZ

Programming
- Format: News/talk/sports
- Affiliations: Fox News Radio; Premiere Networks; Westwood One; West Virginia MetroNews

Ownership
- Owner: WVRC Media; (West Virginia Radio Corporation of Salem)
- Sister stations: WAJR, WBRB, WBTQ, WDNE, WDNE-FM, WELK, WFBY, WFGM-FM, WKKW, WVAQ, WWLW

History
- First air date: 1999 (as WAJR-FM)
- Former call signs: WAJR-FM (1998–2020)

Technical information
- Licensing authority: FCC
- Facility ID: 79305
- Class: A
- ERP: 1,800 watts
- HAAT: 179.7 meters (590 ft)
- Transmitter coordinates: 39°15′44.0″N 80°28′1.0″W

Links
- Public license information: Public file; LMS
- Webcast: Listen Live
- Website: wkmznews.com

WKMZ (103.3 MHz) is a news/talk/sports formatted broadcast radio station licensed to Salem, West Virginia, serving Clarksburg and Weston in West Virginia. WKMZ is owned and operated by WVRC Media.

Former logo
