= WWVU-FM =

Radio station at West Virginia University

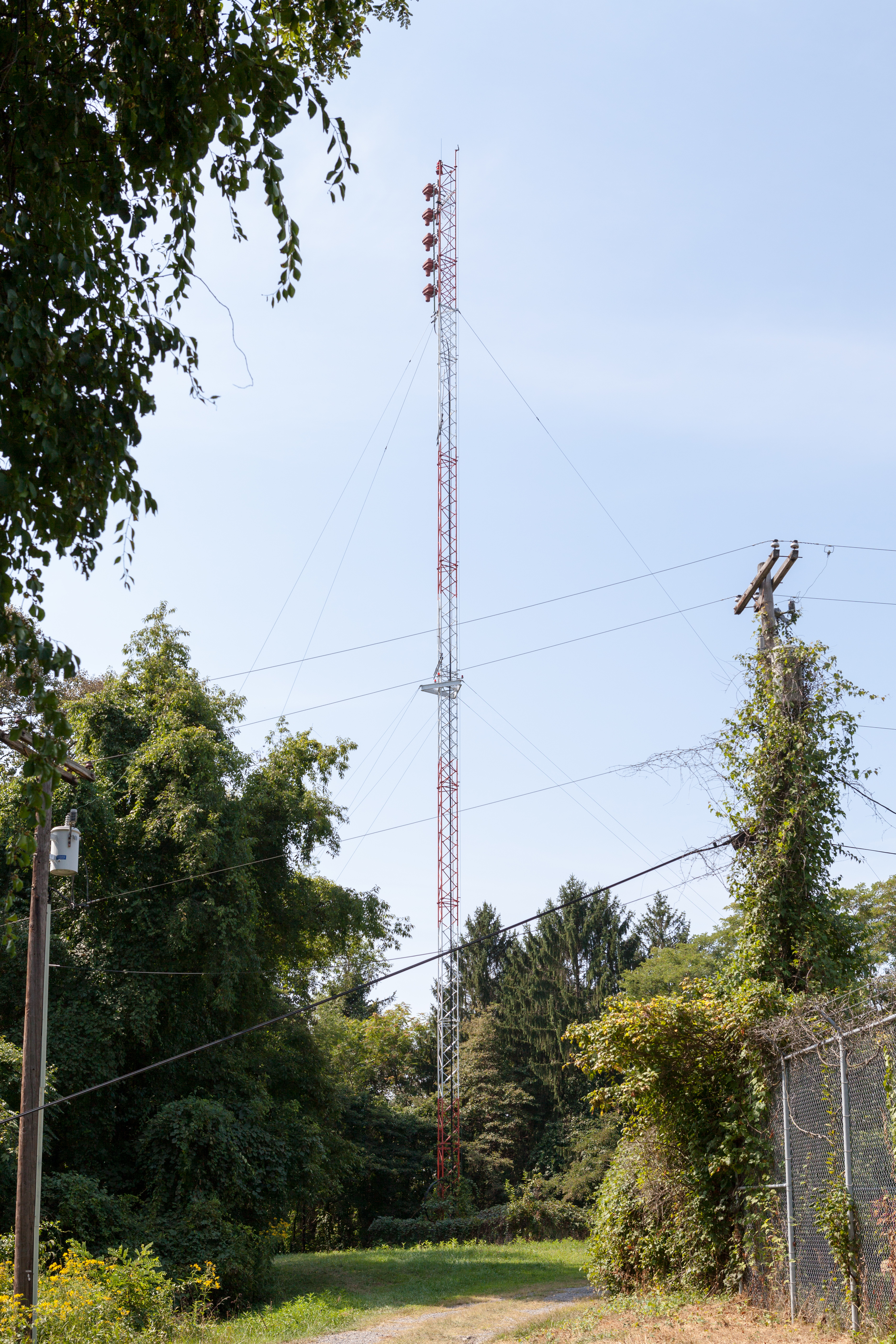
- WWVU-FM transmission tower and antenna
- Morgantown, West Virginia; United States
- Broadcast area: Eastern Monongalia County, West Virginia
- Frequency: 91.7 MHz
- Branding: U92 The Moose

Programming
- Format: College

Ownership
- Owner: West Virginia University; (West Virginia University Board of Governors)

History
- First air date: 1982
- Call sign meaning: West Virginia University

Technical information
- Licensing authority: FCC
- Facility ID: 71691
- Class: A
- ERP: 2,600 watts
- HAAT: 55 meters (180 ft)
- Transmitter coordinates: 39°38′9″N 79°56′38″W

Links
- Public license information: Public file; LMS
- Webcast: Listen live
- Website: u92themoose.com

WWVU-FM is a college radio station licensed in Morgantown, West Virginia, serving Eastern Monongalia County, West Virginia. WWVU-FM is owned and operated by West Virginia University.

Known as U92 The Moose, WWVU-FM broadcasts at 91.7FM, and broadcasts from 284 Prospect St, Morgantown, WV 26505. The station broadcasts college and alternative rock, as well as jazz, punk, hip hop, metal, and other genres, as well as several WVU sports.

== History ==
The university's first broadcasting station, WHD, was licensed on March 16, 1922, for operation at AM 833 kHz. This was the first broadcasting station in the state of West Virginia, and the call letters were randomly issued from a list of available call signs. The university soon determined that the cost of running a broadcasting station exceeded its benefits, so WHD's license was allowed to expire, and it was deleted on November 19, 1923. In the early 1930s, a local commercial station, WMMN, established a studio in Morgantown, and assigned a daily 20 minute time slot to the university for its School of the Air programs.

WWVU-FM first went on the airwaves in 1982 when it opened its studios at the Mountainlair. Known as "The Moose," U92 is a hands-on training ground for students interested in programming music, producing digital content in state-of-the-art studios, providing live Mountaineer sports coverage, or reporting on local and state news. The station is completely student-run and while there is a professional staff member who oversees the operation, it is up to the student directors and volunteer staff to create all content. U92 is currently managed by WVU Student Media, and broadcasts alternative rock and college rock in its "regular rotation." The station currently has programs dedicated to jazz, metal, punk, hip hop, and other genres, and broadcasts several WVU sports including men's and women's soccer, men's and women's basketball, baseball, and more.

== CMJ Accolades ==
In 2015, WWVU-FM won the College Music Journal Station of the Year award. WWVU's Music Director, Elizabeth McIntyre, won Music Director of the Year. Hip-Hop Director, Cody Roane, won the Specialty Show Director of the Year award.

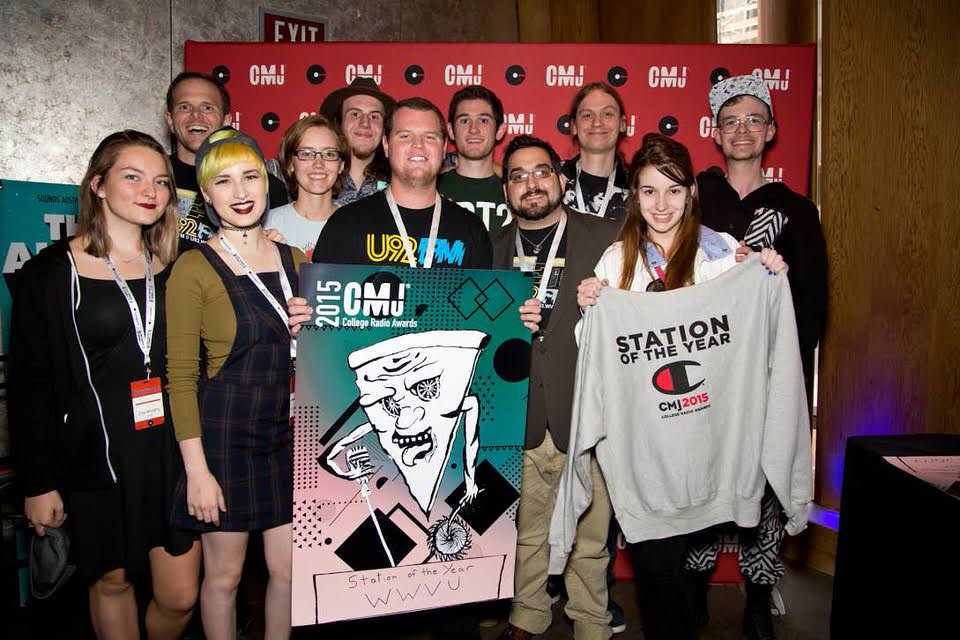
WWVU-FM accepts the 2015 College Music Journal award for Station of the Year in New York City.

== CMJ Nominations ==
In 2015, WWVU was nominated for six College Music Journal awards. The six categories were Station of the Year, Music Director of the Year (Elizabeth McIntyre), Specialty Music Director of the Year (Cody Roane - Hip-Hop), Most Creative, Small Station Big Idea, and Most Improved.

WWVU was nominated for three College Music Journal awards in 2013. One for Music Director of the Year (Jimmy Fortuna), one for Best Community Resource and Biggest Improvement.

== See also ==
- List of radio stations in West Virginia
