= WDNE (AM) =

- Elkins, West Virginia; United States
- Broadcast area: Elkins, West Virginia; Randolph County, West Virginia
- Frequency: 1240 kHz
- Branding: 98.9 WDNE

Programming
- Format: Country
- Affiliations: ABC Radio; ABC Radio News; West Virginia MetroNews

Ownership
- Owner: WVRC Media; (West Virginia Radio Corporation of Elkins)
- Sister stations: WAJR, WBRB, WBTQ, WDNE-FM, WELK, WFBY, WFGM-FM, WKKW, WKMZ, WVAQ, WWLW

History
- First air date: February 1948
- Former call signs: WDNE (1948–Present)
- Call sign meaning: W Davis aNd Elkins a nod to the college

Technical information
- Licensing authority: FCC
- Facility ID: 40182
- Class: C
- Power: 1,000 watts
- Transmitter coordinates: 38°55′24.0″N 79°51′45.0″W
- Translator: 99.9 W260DG (Elkins)

Links
- Public license information: Public file; LMS
- Webcast: Listen Live
- Website: WDNE Online

WDNE (1240 kHz) is a country music formatted broadcast radio station licensed to Elkins, West Virginia, serving Elkins and Randolph County in West Virginia. WDNE is owned and operated by WVRC Media.
