= CLG =

CLG may refer to:

== Places ==
- New Coalinga Municipal Airport, Fresno County, California, USA, IATA code
- Colgong railway station in Kahalgaon, Bhagalpur, Bihar, India, station code

== Organizations ==
- Company limited by guarantee, in UK and Ireland
- Counter Logic Gaming, a professional esports organization
- Chalair Aviation (ICAO airline code: CLG) French regional airline
- WCLG-FM, a radio station in Morgantown, West Virginia, USA
- CLG (Irish: Cumann Lúthchleas Gael), Gaelic Athletic Association

== Other uses ==
- A US Navy hull classification symbol: Guided-missile light cruiser (CLG)
- The Cours de linguistique générale
