= WXCR =

- New Martinsville, West Virginia; United States
- Frequency: 92.3 MHz
- Branding: WXCR 92.3

Programming
- Format: Classic rock
- Affiliations: Pittsburgh Steelers Radio Network

Ownership
- Owner: Hometown Media LLC; (Hometown Media LLC)
- Sister stations: WRRR WCEF

History
- First air date: 2000 (as WNMR)
- Former call signs: WNMR (2000–2003)
- Call sign meaning: W X Classic Rock

Technical information
- Licensing authority: FCC
- Facility ID: 79303
- Class: A
- ERP: 3,200 watts
- HAAT: 138 meters (453 feet)
- Transmitter coordinates: 39°40′16″N 80°53′04″W

Links
- Public license information: Public file; LMS
- Webcast: WXCR Webstream
- Website: WXCR Online

WXCR (92.3 FM) is a radio station licensed to serve New Martinsville, West Virginia. The station is owned by Hometown Media LLC It airs a Classic rock music format.

The station was assigned the WXCR call letters by the Federal Communications Commission on July 17, 2003.
