= WVRW =

- Glenville, West Virginia; United States
- Broadcast area: Glenville, West Virginia; Grantsville, West Virginia; Burnsville, West Virginia; Weston, West Virginia
- Frequency: 107.7 MHz
- Branding: Good Time Oldies 107.7

Programming
- Format: Oldies

Ownership
- Owner: Della Jane Woofter
- Sister stations: WOTR, WHAW

History
- First air date: 2008

Technical information
- Licensing authority: FCC
- Facility ID: 170948
- Class: A
- ERP: 1,700 watts
- HAAT: 190 meters (624 feet)
- Transmitter coordinates: 38°54′29″N 80°49′48″W

Links
- Public license information: Public file; LMS
- Website: wvrwfm.com

WVRW (107.7 FM) is a broadcast radio station licensed to Glenville, West Virginia, and serving the Glenville, Grantsville, Burnsville, & Weston area of Central West Virginia. WVRW is owned and operated by Della Jane Woofter.
