= WBUC =

Simulcast of WPDX-FM, Clarksburg
- Buckhannon, West Virginia; United States
- Broadcast area: Buckhannon, West Virginia; Upshur County, West Virginia
- Frequency: 1460 kHz
- Branding: Superstar Country 104-9 and 92-1 WPDX

Programming
- Format: silent
- Affiliations: West Virginia MetroNews

Ownership
- Owner: AJG Radio Corporation; (AJG Corporation)
- Sister stations: WCLG-FM, WBTQ, WFGM-FM, WPDX-FM, WPDX

History
- First air date: December 13, 1959
- Former call signs: WBUC (1959–Present)
- Call sign meaning: W BUCkhannon

Technical information
- Licensing authority: FCC
- Facility ID: 9301
- Class: D
- Power: 5,000 watts day 24 watts night
- Transmitter coordinates: 38°58′28.0″N 80°12′26.0″W

Links
- Public license information: Public file; LMS
- Webcast: Listen Live
- Website: 1049wpdx.com

WBUC (1460 AM) was last a classic country formatted broadcast radio station licensed to Buckhannon, West Virginia, serving Buckhannon and Upshur County in West Virginia. WBUC is owned and operated by AJG Corporation.

Former logo
