= WRRR-FM =

- Saint Marys, West Virginia; United States
- Broadcast area: St. Marys; New Martinsville; Parkersburg
- Frequency: 93.9 MHz
- Branding: 93R

Programming
- Language: English
- Format: Gold-based Country music
- Affiliations: Fox News Radio; Nash Icon (Westwood One)

Ownership
- Owner: Hometown Media LLC
- Sister stations: WXCR, WCEF

History
- First air date: 1983

Technical information
- Licensing authority: FCC
- Facility ID: 59717
- Class: B1
- ERP: 17,000 watts
- HAAT: 119 meters (390 ft)
- Transmitter coordinates: 39°22′49″N 81°11′36″W

Links
- Public license information: Public file; LMS
- Webcast: Listen live
- Website: 93r.us

WRRR-FM (93.9 MHz, "93R") is an American FM radio station licensed to serve the community of St. Marys, West Virginia. The station's broadcast license is held by Hometown Media LLC, and it has been licensed since October 19, 2004.

The station itself broadcasts with a non-directional antenna. It has an effective radiated power of 17 kW.

WRRR-FM broadcasts a Gold-based Country music format. Originally using the slogan of W-3-R, the station is now branded as "93R" and continues to provide coverage of a wide variety of local events, including sports.

On February 23, 2026, WRRR dropped it's Adult Contemporary format, branded as "Lite Rock 93R" and began airing a Gold-based Country music format, branded simply as "93R".

On the official website associated with the radio, individuals can view local weather and news about local closings and delays.
