= WHAW =

- Lost Creek, West Virginia; United States
- Broadcast area: Weston, West Virginia; Lewis County, West Virginia
- Frequency: 980 kHz
- Branding: WHAW 980 AM

Programming
- Format: Classic Country
- Affiliations: Real Country (Cumulus Media)

Ownership
- Owner: Della Jane Woofter
- Sister stations: WOTR, WVRW

History
- First air date: 1948
- Former frequencies: 1450 kHz (1948–1959)
- Call sign meaning: W Harold A. McWhorter (see note); W Harold And Wilda

Technical information
- Licensing authority: FCC
- Facility ID: 63489
- Class: D
- Power: 25,000 watts daytime 47 watts nighttime
- Transmitter coordinates: 39°02′25″N 80°27′16″W

Links
- Public license information: Public file; LMS
- Website: WHAW Online

WHAW is a Classic Country formatted broadcast radio station licensed to Lost Creek, West Virginia, serving Weston and Lewis County, West Virginia. WHAW is owned and operated by Della Jane Woofter.

== Programming ==
The station derives its programming from Real Country from Cumulus Media.

== History ==
The original owner was the Lewis Service Corporation, whose principal was Harold A. McWhorter. Harold established WPAR Parkersburg in 1935, and WHAW Weston in 1948. Harold wanted his initials as the call letters, WHAM, but Stromberg Carlson had those on 1180 in Rochester. He chose WHAW, telling some they stood for "Harold and (his wife) Wilda," others that he had just turned over the "M" in McWhorter.

On February 14, 2008, WHAW changed their format from oldies to bluegrass.

On April 1, 2010, WHAW changed their format from bluegrass to classic country.
