= WKMM =

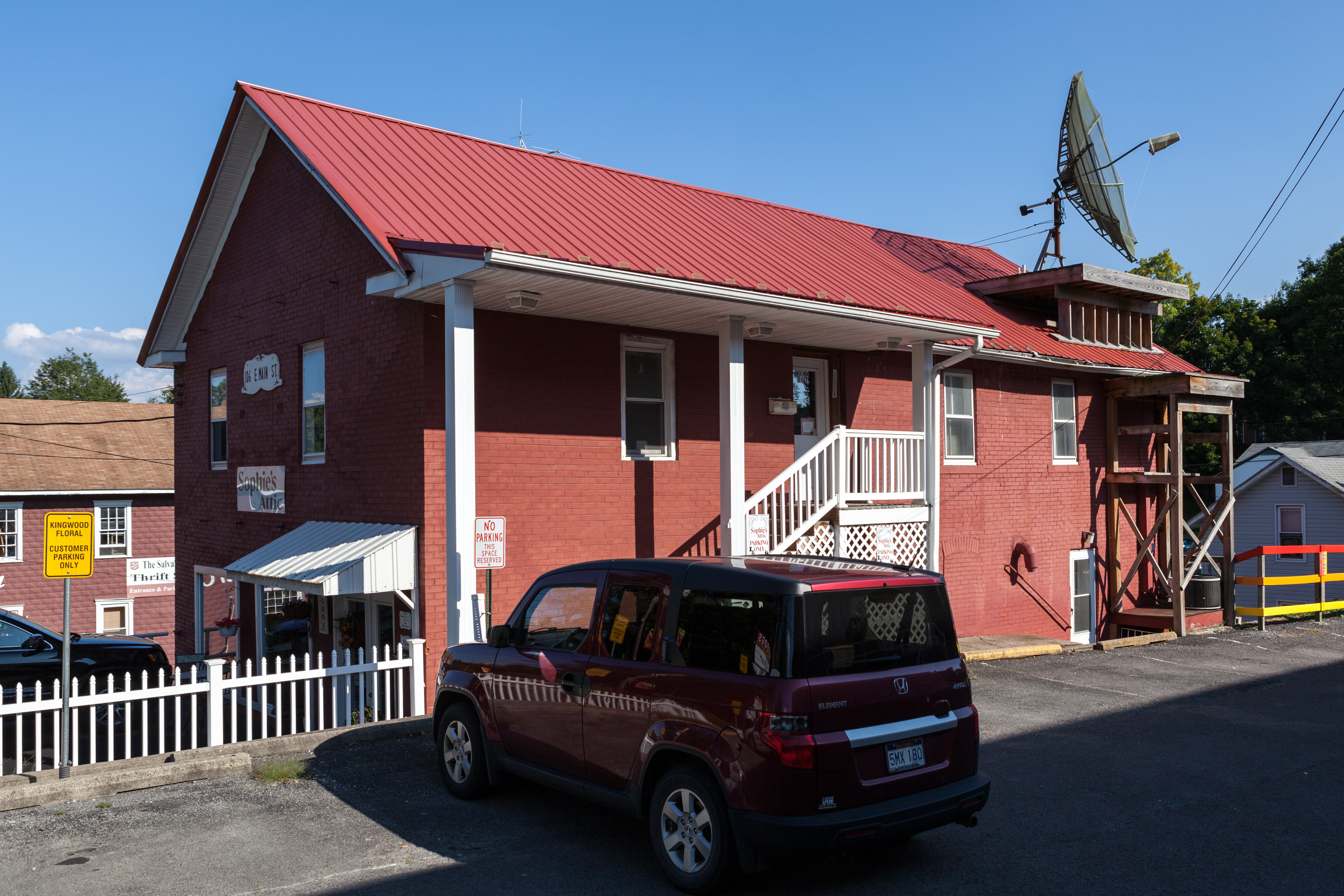
- Kingwood, West Virginia; United States
- Broadcast area: Preston County, West Virginia
- Frequency: 96.7 MHz
- Branding: 96-7 K-Country

Programming
- Language: English
- Format: Country music
- Affiliations: Westwood One (Real Country); WVU Mountaineer Sports Network

Ownership
- Owner: Greg Bolyard; (WKMM Radio, LLC)
- Sister stations: WFSP, WFSP-FM

History
- First air date: December 2, 1987

Technical information
- Licensing authority: Federal Communications Commission
- Facility ID: 7725
- Class: A
- ERP: 500 watts
- HAAT: 241 meters (791 ft)
- Transmitter coordinates: 39°27′25.3″N 79°35′25.2″W

Links
- Public license information: Public file; LMS
- Webcast: Listen live
- Website: www.kcountryradio.com

WKMM (96.7 FM) is a country music formatted radio station licensed to Kingwood, West Virginia, it serves Kingwood and Preston County, West Virginia. WKMM is owned by Greg Bolyard and operated under its WKMM Radio, LLC licensee.

== Ownership/technical ==
From 1992 until 2005, WKMM was owned by Kingwood businessman P.J. Crogan. Neil Waldeck purchased the station in 2005. Waldeck died in December 2022, with control of the station transferred to his daughter Emily. The transfer of control was completed on October 17, 2023.

Less than two months later, on December 4, Emily Waldeck filed with the FCC to sell WKMM to station operations manager and morning show host Greg Bolyard and his company WKMM Radio, LLC. The sale price of the station was $70,000. Bolyard purchased Preston County's other two radio stations, WFSP-FM and sister-station WFSP in August 2025 for $250,000.

WKMM's studios are located on Main Street in Kingwood, while its transmitter is located along West Virginia Route 7 near Terra Alta, West Virginia.
