= WVIW =

- Bridgeport, West Virginia; United States
- Broadcast area: North-Central West Virginia
- Frequency: 104.1 MHz

Programming
- Format: Christian radio
- Network: VCY America

Ownership
- Owner: VCY America, Inc.

History
- First air date: June 29, 1991
- Former call signs: WDCI (1988–2010); WETT (2010–2017)

Technical information
- Licensing authority: FCC
- Facility ID: 17065
- Class: A
- ERP: 2,450 watts
- HAAT: 158 meters (518 ft)
- Transmitter coordinates: 39°17′59.0″N 80°17′30.0″W

Links
- Public license information: Public file; LMS
- Webcast: Listen live
- Website: vcyamerica.org

WVIW is a Christian formatted broadcast radio station licensed to Bridgeport, West Virginia, serving North-Central West Virginia. WVIW is owned and operated by VCY America.

== History ==
From 1960 until 2001, the station held the call sign WIJK. In 2009, it was under the KISS brand as WDCI-FM with a soft adult contemporary format. WETT changed its callsign from WDCI to WETT on April 29, 2010. In summer of 2010, its format was changed to adult hits as WETT 104. From 2012 to 2017 WETT became an adult contemporary Radio under the Name Mix 104. At the end of 2017, it adopted a Christian format. In December 2017 WETT's call sign was changed to WVIW.
