= WYKM =

Coordinates: 37°59′35″N 80°41′03″W

- Rupert, West Virginia; United States
- Broadcast area: Rupert, West Virginia; Rainelle, West Virginia
- Frequency: 1250 kHz
- Branding: WYKM AM 1250

Programming
- Format: Country; Americana
- Affiliations: ABC Radio's "Today's Best Country" network CBS Radio News; West Virginia MetroNews

Ownership
- Owner: Mountain State Broadcasting Company

History
- First air date: 1981
- Call sign meaning: W Your Kountry Music

Technical information
- Licensing authority: FCC
- Facility ID: 46743
- Class: D
- Power: 5,000 Watts daytime only
- Translators: W229CY (93.7 MHz, Rupert)

Links
- Public license information: Public file; LMS

WYKM was a Country formatted daytime only broadcast radio station licensed to Rupert, West Virginia, serving Rupert, Rainelle, and the northwest corner of Greenbrier County, West Virginia. WYKM is owned and operated by Mountain State Broadcasting Company.

The station went silent around September 30, 2024 following the passing of owner Betty Crookshanks.
