= WCEF =

- Ripley, West Virginia; United States
- Broadcast area: Ripley, West Virginia; Jackson County, West Virginia
- Frequency: 98.3 MHz
- Branding: C 98.3 The Bull

Programming
- Format: Country
- Affiliations: West Virginia MetroNews; Fox News Radio; West Virginia University

Ownership
- Owner: Hometown Media LLC; (Hometown Media LLC)
- Sister stations: WRRR-FM, WXCR

History
- First air date: 1981
- Call sign meaning: reference to earlier station in Parkersburg

Technical information
- Licensing authority: FCC
- Facility ID: 40922
- Class: A
- ERP: 6,000 watts
- HAAT: 94 Meters
- Transmitter coordinates: 38°46′4.0″N 81°41′9.0″W

Links
- Public license information: Public file; LMS
- Website: WCEF Online

WCEF (98.3 FM) is a Country formatted broadcast radio station licensed to Ripley, West Virginia, serving Ripley and Jackson County, West Virginia. WCEF is owned and operated by Hometown Media LLC.
