= WVAQ =

- Morgantown, West Virginia; United States
- Broadcast area: North Central West Virginia; Southwest Pennsylvania
- Frequency: 101.9 MHz (HD Radio)
- Branding: 102 WVAQ

Programming
- Format: Contemporary hit radio
- Subchannels: HD2: WAJR simulcast

Ownership
- Owner: WVRC Media
- Sister stations: WAJR, WBRB, WDNE, WELK,WDNE-FM, WFBY,WKKW, WKMZ, WWLW

History
- First air date: 1948
- Former call signs: WAJR-FM (1948–1977); WVAQ (1977–Present)
- Call sign meaning: West Virginia's "Q" (common FM pop station branding)

Technical information
- Licensing authority: FCC
- Facility ID: 71677
- Class: B
- ERP: 50,000 watts
- HAAT: 152 meters (499 ft)
- Transmitter coordinates: 39°36′30.0″N 79°59′7.0″W

Links
- Public license information: Public file; LMS
- Webcast: Listen Live
- Website: wvaq.com

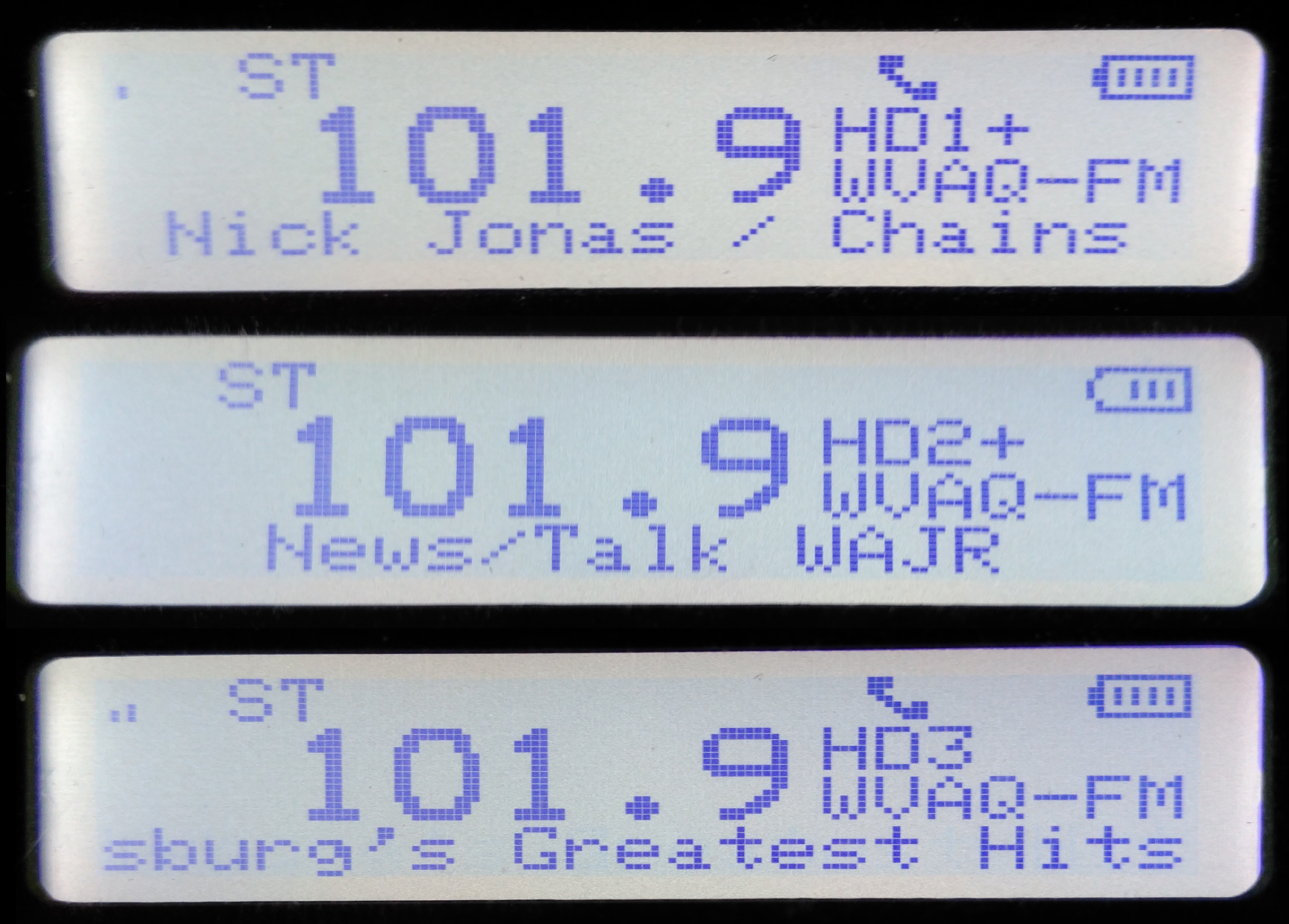
WVAQ's HD Radio Channels on a SPARC Radio with PSD.

WVAQ (101.9 FM) is a contemporary hit radio formatted broadcast radio station licensed to Morgantown, West Virginia, serving North Central West Virginia and Southwest Pennsylvania including cities south of Greater Pittsburgh. WVAQ is owned and operated by WVRC Media.
