= WLOL-FM =

- Star City, West Virginia; United States
- Broadcast area: Morgantown, West Virginia; Star City, West Virginia; Westover, West Virginia
- Frequency: 89.7 MHz
- Branding: Light of Life Ministry

Programming
- Format: Catholic radio

Ownership
- Owner: Light of Life Community, Inc.
- Sister stations: WVUS

History
- Call sign meaning: "Light of Life"

Technical information
- Licensing authority: FCC
- Class: A
- ERP: 80 watts
- HAAT: 56.3 meters (185 ft)
- Transmitter coordinates: 39°40′9.3″N 80°0′11″W

Links
- Public license information: Public file; LMS
- Webcast: Listen live
- Website: www.lolradio.org/7r%20Radio.html

WLOL-FM is a Catholic radio station licensed to Star City, West Virginia, and serving the Morgantown–Star City–Westover area. WLOL-FM is owned and operated by Light of Life Community, Inc.
