= WHD (AM) =

Radio station in Morgantown, West Virginia (1922-1923)

WHD was a short-lived American AM radio station in Morgantown, West Virginia, operated by West Virginia University. First licensed on March 16, 1922, it was the first broadcasting station authorized in the state. WHD was deleted in November 1923.

== History ==
The Department of Commerce regulated radio stations in the United States from 1912 until the 1927 formation of the Federal Radio Commission. Originally there were no restrictions on which radio stations could make broadcasts intended for the general public. However, effective December 1, 1921, a regulation was adopted limiting broadcasting to stations operating under a Limited Commercial license that authorized operation on designated wavelengths of 360 meters (833 kHz) for "entertainment", and 485 meters (619 kHz) for "market and weather reports".

WHD was first licensed on March 16, 1922, to West Virginia University, for operation on 360 meters. The call sign was randomly issued from a list of available call letters. The person primarily responsible for its establishment was Dr. Chauncey W. Waggoner, the head of the physics department. Because there was only a single "entertainment" wavelength, WHD was required to establish a time-sharing agreement with any other local stations broadcasting on 360 meters.

In late April, the projected schedule was announced as evenings, daily from 4 to 6 and 7 to 7:30 p.m., except for Sundays, when the schedule would be 10:45 to noon. The station was mainly used for experimental purposes, and made few entertainment and informational broadcasts. The university soon determined that the cost of running a broadcasting station exceeded its benefits, so WHD's license was allowed to expire, and it was deleted on November 19, 1923.

In the early 1930s, a local commercial station, WMMN, established a studio in Morgantown, and assigned a daily 20 minute time slot to the university for its School of the Air programs. In 1982, the university returned to radio broadcasting with the establishment of educational station WWVU-FM.

== See also ==
- List of initial AM-band station grants in the United States
