= WOTR (FM) =

- Weston, West Virginia; United States
- Broadcast area: Clarksburg, West Virginia; Weston, West Virginia
- Frequency: 96.3 MHz

Programming
- Format: Southern Gospel; Positive Country

Ownership
- Owner: Della Jane Woofter
- Sister stations: WVRW, WHAW

History
- First air date: 1991

Technical information
- Licensing authority: FCC
- Facility ID: 1103
- Class: A
- ERP: 3,700 watts
- HAAT: 127 meters
- Transmitter coordinates: 39°8′43.0″N 80°19′40.0″W

Links
- Public license information: Public file; LMS
- Website: WOTR Online

WOTR (96.3 FM) is a Southern Gospel and Positive Country broadcast radio station licensed to Weston, West Virginia, United States, and serves the Clarksburg/Weston area. WOTR is owned and operated by Della Jane Woofter.

== Sale ==
On February 13, 2009, Harry Allman (Administrator) (under the company name Allman Electronics Lab) sold WOTR for $75,000 to Stephen Peters, owner of nearby WHAW. The reason for the sale was the death of owner James Allman. During this period, the station was silent.

On May 15, 2009, WOTR relaunched with programming from the Inspirational Country Radio Network, carrying a Southern Gospel and Positive Country format mixed with Bluegrass. WOTR is the network's first affiliate.
