= WFSP (AM) =

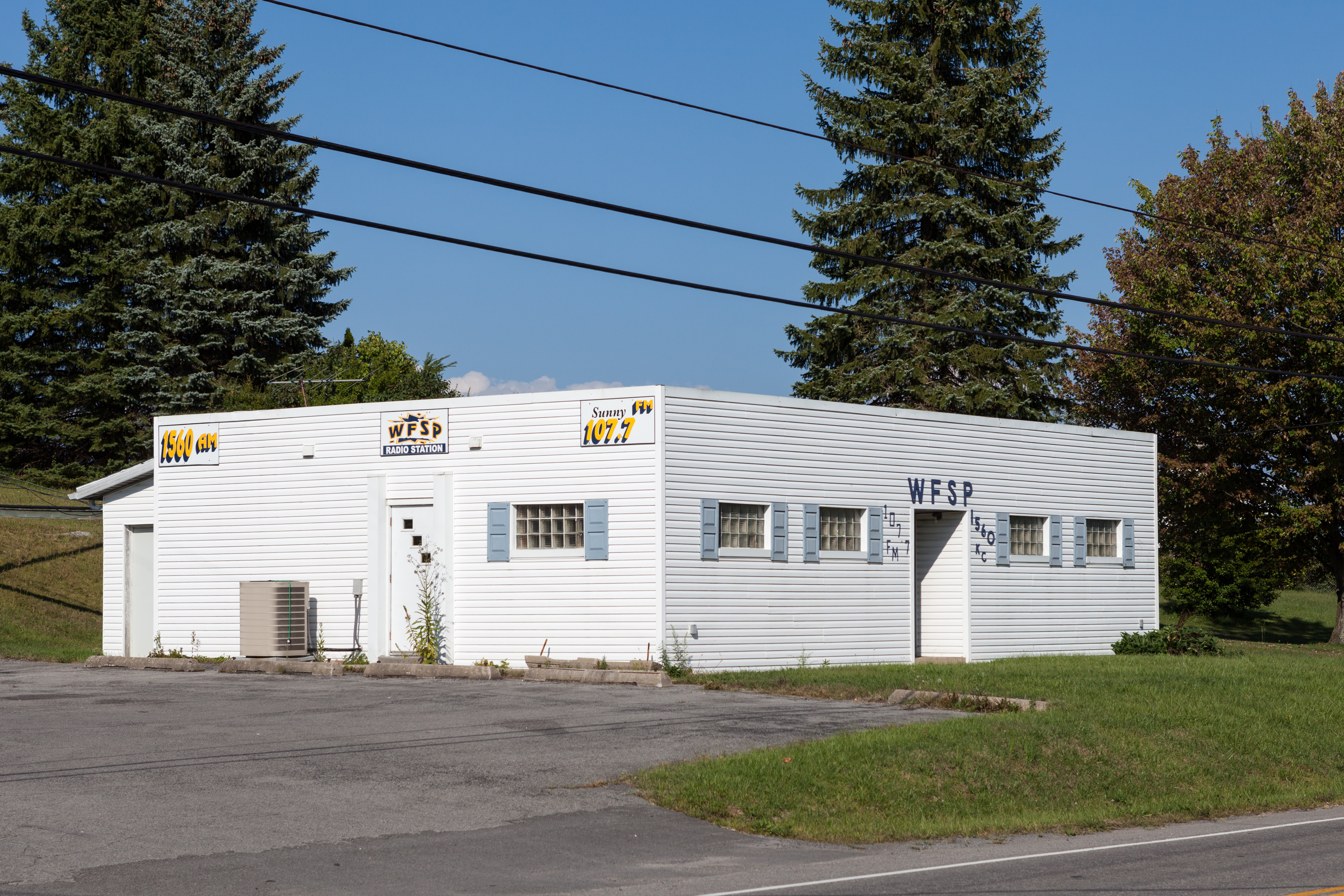
- Studios of WFSP-AM/FM, located along West Virginia Route 7 outside of Kingwood
- Kingwood, West Virginia; United States
- Broadcast area: Kingwood, West Virginia; Preston County, West Virginia
- Frequency: 1560 kHz
- Branding: NewsTalk 1560 WFSP

Programming
- Format: Talk radio
- Affiliations: Fox News Radio; Premiere Networks; TownHall Radio; West Virginia MetroNews

Ownership
- Owner: Greg Bolyard; (WFSP Broadcasting, LLC)
- Sister stations: WFSP-FM

History
- First air date: August 25, 1967
- Call sign meaning: Free State of Preston

Technical information
- Licensing authority: FCC
- Facility ID: 70624
- Class: D
- Power: 1,000 watts (days only); 250 watts (critical hours)
- Transmitter coordinates: 39°28′50.0″N 79°43′11.0″W

Links
- Public license information: Public file; LMS
- Webcast: Listen Live
- Website: WFSP Online

WFSP is a talk formatted broadcast radio station. The station is licensed to Kingwood, West Virginia and serves Kingwood and Preston County in West Virginia. The station is owned by Greg Bolyard and operated under its WFSP Broadcasting, LLC. licensee.

== Sale ==
On June 6, 2013, WFSP and sister station WFSP-FM were sold to David Wills' Kingwood-based WFSP Radio, LLC for $500,000. The sale was closed on September 30, 2013.

Wills died in 2002. WFSP and sister WFSP-FM were sold again in August 2025 to Greg Bolyard's WFSP Broadcasting, LLC for $250,000. Bolyard owns Kingwood's other radio station WKMM.
