= WKKW =

- Fairmont, West Virginia; United States
- Broadcast area: North Central West Virginia
- Frequency: 97.9 MHz
- Branding: 97.9 WKKW

Programming
- Format: Country
- Affiliations: Premiere Networks

Ownership
- Owner: WVRC Media
- Sister stations: WAJR, WBRB, WDNE, WELK,WDNE-FM, WFBY, WKMZ, WVAQ, WWLW

History
- First air date: October 1975
- Former call signs: WFGM (1975–1996); WKKW (1996–Present)

Technical information
- Licensing authority: FCC
- Facility ID: 15253
- Class: B
- ERP: 29,000 watts
- HAAT: 195 meters (640 ft)
- Transmitter coordinates: 39°25′4.0″N 80°3′44.0″W

Links
- Public license information: Public file; LMS
- Webcast: Listen Live
- Website: wkkwfm.com

WKKW (97.9 FM) is a country music formatted broadcast radio station licensed to Fairmont, West Virginia, serving North Central West Virginia. WKKW is owned and operated by WVRC Media.
