= WMTD (AM) =

- Hinton, West Virginia; United States
- Broadcast area: Metro Hinton
- Frequency: 1380 kHz
- Branding: Classic Hits 98.3 WMTD

Programming
- Format: Classic hits
- Affiliations: Premiere Networks

Ownership
- Owner: MountainPlex Media
- Sister stations: WMTD-FM

History
- First air date: 1963

Technical information
- Licensing authority: FCC
- Facility ID: 6013
- Class: D
- Power: 1,000 watts day 13 watts night
- Transmitter coordinates: 37°40′59.0″N 80°54′53.0″W
- Translator: 98.3 W252DH (Hinton)

Links
- Public license information: Public file; LMS
- Webcast: Listen Live
- Website: hits98.fm

WMTD (1380 kHz) is a classic hits formatted broadcast radio station licensed to Hinton, West Virginia, serving Metro Hinton. WMTD is owned and operated by MountainPlex Media.

== Translator ==
WMTD relays its programming to an FM translator is order to improve coverage, especially at night when the AM frequency reduces power to only 13 watts. The translator also gives the advantage of FM broadcasting with its improved high fidelity stereophonic sound. The 98.3 frequency is in fact the primary branding used on the station logo.

Broadcast translator for WMTD (AM)
Call sign	Frequency	City of license	FID	ERP (W)	Class	FCC info
W252DH	98.3 FM	Hinton, West Virginia	141861	250	D	LMS
