= WFSP-FM =

Radio station in Kingwood, West Virginia

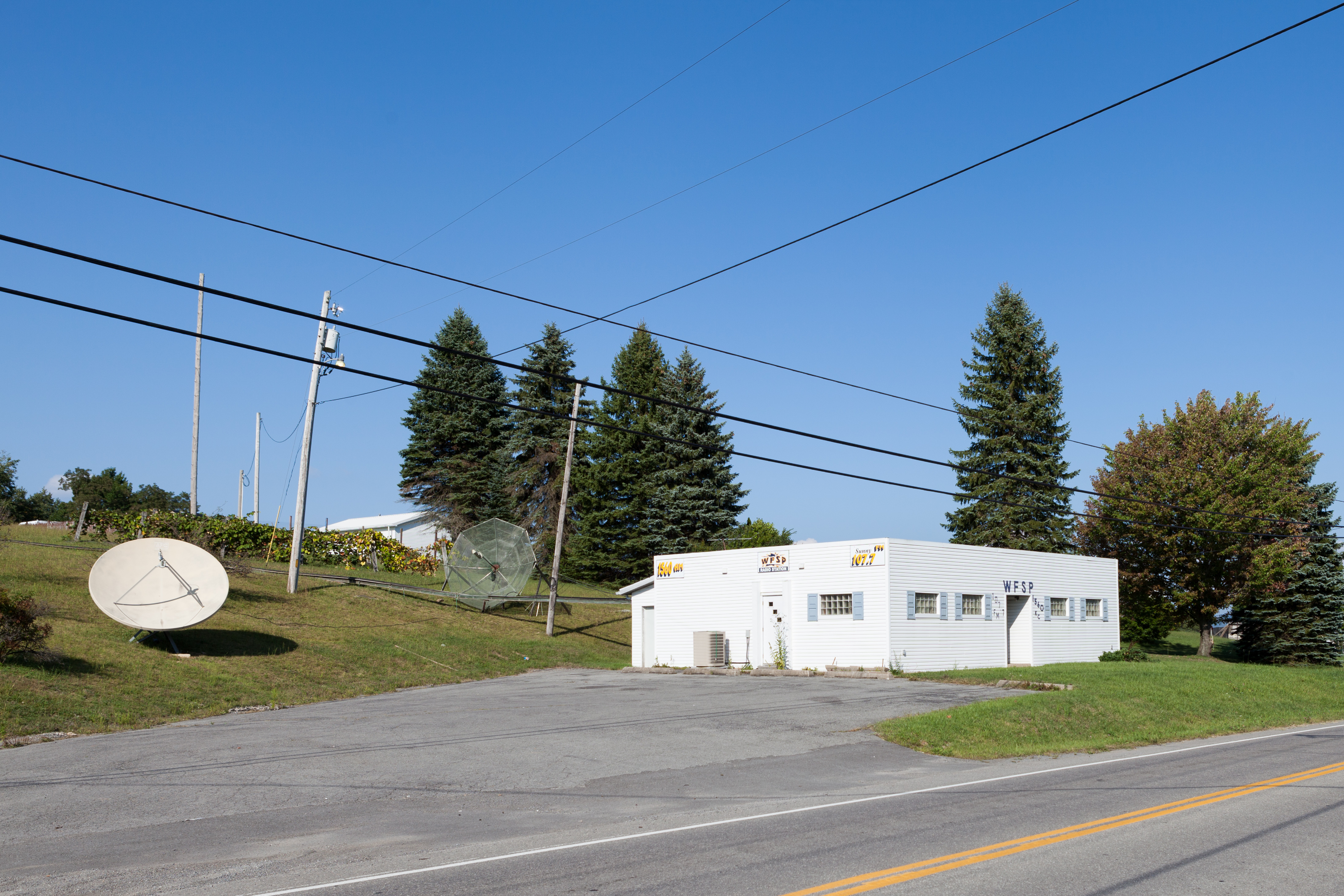
- Kingwood, West Virginia; United States
- Broadcast area: Preston County, West Virginia; Morgantown, West Virginia; Oakland, Maryland
- Frequency: 107.7 MHz
- Branding: Classic Hits 107.7

Programming
- Format: Classic hits; Oldies
- Affiliations: SRN News; West Virginia MetroNews; Westwood One's Good Time Oldies

Ownership
- Owner: Greg Bolyard; (WFSP Broadcasting, LLC)
- Sister stations: WFSP, WKMM

History
- First air date: June 10, 1991
- Call sign meaning: Free State of Preston

Technical information
- Licensing authority: Federal Communications Commission
- Facility ID: 72071
- Class: A
- ERP: 1,850 watts
- HAAT: 183 meters (600 ft)
- Transmitter coordinates: 39°27′26.60″N 79°36′9.90″W

Links
- Public license information: Public file; LMS
- Webcast: Listen live
- Website: wfspradio.com

WFSP-FM is a classic hits and oldies formatted radio station. It is licensed to Kingwood, West Virginia and serves Preston County, West Virginia, Morgantown, West Virginia, and Oakland, Maryland. The station is owned by Greg Bolyard and operated under its WFSP Broadcasting, LLC. licensee.

== Sale ==
On June 6, 2013, WFSP-FM and sister station WFSP were sold to David Wills' Kingwood-based WFSP Radio, LLC for $500,000. The sale was closed on September 30, 2013.

Wills passed away in 2002. WFSP-FM and sister WFSP-AM were sold again in August 2025 to Greg Bolyard's WFSP Broadcasting, LLC for $250,000. Bolyard owns Kingwood's other radio station WKMM.
