= North Central West Virginia =

Region of West Virginia, United States

Coordinates: 39°30′N 80°10′W

Map of counties in North Central West Virginia

North Central West Virginia (sometimes known as "Mountaineer Country") is a region in the U.S. state of West Virginia. The region's largest cities are Morgantown, Fairmont, and Clarksburg.

== Counties ==
- Monongalia County
- Marion County
- Harrison County
- Taylor County
- Doddridge County

These counties are sometimes also included in the region.

- Barbour County
- Lewis County
- Upshur County
- Preston County
- Randolph County
- Wetzel County

== Cities and towns ==
- Morgantown
- Fairmont
- Mannington
- Clarksburg
- Bridgeport
- Grafton
- West Union

Note: These cities are sometimes included within the region.

- Kingwood
- Philippi
- New Martinsville
- Weston
- Buckhannon
- Elkins

== Media ==
=== TV ===
- WBOY-TV (NBC-12)
- EBOY-TV (ABC-11)
- WDTV-TV (CBS-5)
- WNPB-TV (PBS-24)
- WVFX-TV (FOX-46)

=== Radio ===
- WAJR - News/Talk/Sports-1440 AM
- WVAQ - Top 40-101.9 FM
- WKKW - Country-97.9 FM
- WWLW - Classic Hits -106.5 FM
- WCLG - Active rock-100.1 FM
- WGYE - Conservative talk-102.7 FM
- WRLF - Conservative talk -94.3 FM
- WPDX - Classic country-104.9 FM
- WFGM-FM - Classic Hits -93.1 FM
- WVIW - Christian-104.1 FM
- WKTZ-FM - Classic Hits -95.9 FM
- WZST - Conservative talk -100.9 FM
- WOTR - Religious - 96.3 FM
- WHTI - Conservative talk-105.7 FM
- WVUS - Catholic-1190 AM
- WXJ85 - NOAA Weather Radio-162.550 MHz

=== Print ===
- Times West Virginian (Fairmont)
- The Dominion Post (Morgantown)
- Clarksburg Exponent-Telegram (Clarksburg)

== Transportation ==
=== Public Transit ===
A network of intracity and intercity buses is provided in the area by three private services: CENTRA, the Fairmont Marion County Transit Authority, and the Mountain Line Transit Authority.

The Fairmont Marion County Transit Authority provides bus routes focusing on Marion County, but trips to the nearby cities of Clarksburg and Morgantown are also provided for a charge of $2.00, one way. Free transfers are provided at the Marion County courthouse. All routes within the county have a flat rate of $0.75, but for all routes, children under the age of 6 ride free.

CENTRA is a service based at the southern end of the region, serving the areas around Clarksburg and Harrison County. Travel is facilitated by 16 individual lines that run weekdays from 6 AM to 6 PM, and Saturdays from 8 AM to 4 PM.

The Mountain Line Transit Authority provides bus routes in and around Monongalia County and WVU campuses. When WVU is in session, 18 routes around Morgantown provide service from as early as 6 AM to as late as 2:30 AM. During summer these hours are slightly reduced, and some routes are eliminated. The Grey Line is a special intercity service connecting the area to Pittsburgh for a flat rate of $25.00 per ride. For regular routes, the standard individual fare is $0.75, with special packages such as monthly passes or individual deviations. Transfers are $0.75, and children 5 and under ride free.

=== Highways ===
==== Interstates ====
- Interstate 79
- Interstate 68

==== The U.S. ====
- U.S. Route 50
- U.S. Route 19
- U.S. Route 119
- U.S. Route 250

==== Appalachian Corridors ====
- Corridor D
- Corridor H

==== WV ====
- West Virginia Route 20
- West Virginia Route 310
- West Virginia Route 7
- West Virginia Route 58
- West Virginia Route 57

==== Airports ====
- Morgantown Municipal Airport
- North Central West Virginia Airport

== Population ==
County	2013 (estimate)	2010	2000	1990	1980	1970	1960	1950
Doddridge	8,344	8,202	7,403	6,994	7,433	6,389	6,970	9,026
Harrison	68,972	69,099	68,652	69,371	77,710	73,028	77,856	85,296
Marion	56,868	56,418	56,598	57,249	65,789	61,356	63,717	71,521
Monongalia	102,274	96,189	81,866	75,509	75,024	63,714	55,617	60,797
Taylor	16,973	16,895	16,089	15,144	16,584	13,878	15,010	18,422

"U.S. Census website". U.S. Census Bureau.
