= WMTD-FM =

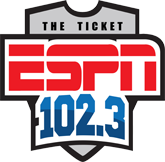
- Hinton, West Virginia; United States
- Broadcast area: Beckley, West Virginia
- Frequency: 102.3 MHz
- Branding: ESPN 102.3 The Ticket

Programming
- Format: Sports
- Affiliations: ESPN Radio

Ownership
- Owner: Kenneth Allman; (Mountainplex Media II, LLC)
- Sister stations: WMTD

History
- First air date: 1985

Technical information
- Licensing authority: FCC
- Facility ID: 6012
- Class: A
- ERP: 370 watts
- HAAT: 388 meters (1,273 ft)
- Transmitter coordinates: 37°42′53.0″N 80°57′9.0″W

Links
- Public license information: Public file; LMS
- Webcast: Listen Live
- Website: theticket102.com

WMTD-FM (102.3 MHz) is a sports formatted broadcast radio station licensed to Hinton, West Virginia, serving Beckley, West Virginia. WMTD-FM is owned and operated by Kenneth Allman, through licensee Mountainplex Media II, LLC.

== History ==
On April 5, 2010, WMTD-FM switched from classic rock to sports as "ESPN 102.3, The Ticket" picking up the full national lineup of ESPN Radio personalities.
