= WVOW (AM) =

- Logan, West Virginia; United States
- Broadcast area: Logan, West Virginia; Logan County, West Virginia
- Frequency: 1290 kHz
- Branding: WVOW Radio

Programming
- Format: Full-service
- Affiliations: ABC Radio News; ESPN Radio

Ownership
- Owner: Logan Broadcasting Corporation
- Sister stations: WVOW-FM

History
- First air date: May 1954

Technical information
- Licensing authority: FCC
- Facility ID: 38268
- Class: B
- Power: 5,000 watts (day); 1,000 watts (night)
- Transmitter coordinates: 37°51′22.0″N 81°58′19.0″W

Links
- Public license information: Public file; LMS
- Webcast: Listen live
- Website: wvowradio.com

WVOW is a Full Service formatted broadcast radio station licensed to Logan, West Virginia, serving Logan and Logan County, West Virginia. WVOW is owned and operated by Logan Broadcasting Corporation.
