= WVOW-FM =

Radio station in Logan, West Virginia

- Logan, West Virginia; United States
- Broadcast area: Southern West Virginia
- Frequency: 101.9 MHz
- Branding: WVOW Radio

Programming
- Format: Full Service
- Affiliations: ABC Radio News; ESPN Radio

Ownership
- Owner: Logan Broadcasting Corporation
- Sister stations: WVOW

History
- First air date: August 1969

Technical information
- Licensing authority: FCC
- Facility ID: 38267
- Class: B
- ERP: 15,000 watts (horiz.); 13,500 watts (vert.)
- HAAT: 253 meters (830 ft)
- Transmitter coordinates: 37°51′24.0″N 81°58′18.0″W

Links
- Public license information: Public file; LMS
- Website: WVOW Online

WVOW-FM is a Full Service formatted broadcast radio station licensed to Logan, West Virginia, serving Southern West Virginia. WVOW-FM is owned and operated by Logan Broadcasting Corporation.
