= WVUS =

- Grafton, West Virginia; United States
- Broadcast area: Taylor County, West Virginia
- Frequency: 1190 kHz
- Branding: Light of Life Ministry

Programming
- Format: Catholic radio

Ownership
- Owner: Light of Life Community, Inc.
- Sister stations: WLOL-FM

History
- First air date: 1957
- Former call signs: WVVW (1957–1982); WKGA (1982–1986); WTBZ (1986–2008)
- Call sign meaning: West Virginia, United States

Technical information
- Licensing authority: FCC
- Facility ID: 64661
- Class: D
- Power: 250 watts daytime; 22 watts nighttime
- Transmitter coordinates: 39°21′1″N 80°2′40″W
- Translator: 97.5 W248DB (Clarksburg)

Links
- Public license information: Public file; LMS
- Website: WVUS Online

WVUS is a Catholic radio formatted broadcast radio station licensed to Grafton, West Virginia, serving Grafton and Taylor County, West Virginia. WVUS is owned and operated by Light of Life Community, Inc.

WVUS operates on a frequency of 1190 kHz, a United States and Mexican clear-channel frequency. WVUS must reduce power from sunset to sunrise to prevent nighttime skywave interference to the Class A stations.

== History ==
WVUS was first licensed as WVVW in 1957; a condition of the station's launch was that principal J. Patrick Beacom had to relinquish his interest in WTCS in Fairmont. The station switched calls to WKGA in July 1982.

In 1986, WKGA would become country formatted WTBZ and begin simulcasting then co-owned WTBZ-FM (now WKTZ-FM). In August 2002, WTBZ-FM was sold to Educational Media Foundation (becoming a K-Love affiliate), while WTBZ dropped country for a rhythmic contemporary hit radio format.

On May 6, 2008, WTBZ became WVUS in the first step as becoming a "new station". Then-owner Appalachian Radio filed an application to move the station from AM 1260 to AM 1190 and increase the station's daytime power to 4,500 watts. On August 8, 2008, WVUS officially began broadcasting on AM 1190.

It was announced on November 6, 2009, that owner Steven Tocco was attempting to sell the station at an asking price of $59,000. Tocco cited low ad revenue and high operating costs as reasons for the sale, and gave a shutdown date of December 31. On December 23, 2009, WVUS was sold to Light of Life Community, Inc. for $62,550. On March 8, 2010, WVUS dropped its adult standards format for Catholic radio programming.

== See also ==
- WVVW history page with photos
