= WVAM =

Radio station in Parkersburg, West Virginia

- Parkersburg, West Virginia; United States
- Frequency: 1450 kHz
- Branding: 98.1 and 107.9 WVAM

Programming
- Format: Oldies

Ownership
- Owner: Thomas Taggart and Samuel Yoho; (Mid Ohio Valley Radio Corporation)

History
- First air date: July 11, 1935 (as WPAR at 1420)
- Former call signs: WPAR (1935–1983); WIKS (1983–1986); WLTP (1986–2004); WHNK (2004–2020)
- Former frequencies: 1420 kHz (1935–1941)
- Call sign meaning: West Virginia AM

Technical information
- Licensing authority: FCC
- Facility ID: 73353
- Class: C
- Power: 1,000 watts day and night
- Transmitter coordinates: 39°17′23.0″N 81°31′36.0″W
- Translators: 98.1 W251CP (Parkersburg); 107.9 W300AQ (Williamstown)

Links
- Public license information: Public file; LMS
- Website: wvamradio.com

WVAM is a radio station in Parkersburg, West Virginia. Owned by Mid-Ohio Valley Radio Corporation, it broadcasts an oldies format.

== History ==
The station signed on July 11, 1935 as WPAR, operating with 100 watts at 1420 kHz under the ownership of the Ohio Valley Broadcasting Corporation. On February 13, 1937, WPAR became an affiliate of the CBS radio network. It moved to 1450 in 1941; at the same time, WPAR boosted its power to 250 watts. The station was Parkersburg's first radio station and remained the only station in the area during its first decade of broadcasting. On September 22, 1983, the station was renamed WIKS; on November 1, 1986, it became WLTP. The WLTP call sign moved to its sister station at 910 AM on March 9, 2004; at that time, 1450 AM became WHNK.

Clear Channel took WHNK off-the-air on April 28, 2014 after the station lost its lease with Walker Machinery, which owned WHNK's transmitter site and intended to use the property for expansion. At the time of the going silent, WHNK was broadcasting a classic country format.

On November 1, 2016, WHNK returned to the air with a Christian radio format branded as FaithTalk 1450, airing Christian talk and teaching programs.

In August 2020, the station and its two translators were sold to Mid Ohio Valley Radio Corporation for $30,000. On August 30, the station announced that it would drop its Christian talk format on August 31 and flip to oldies under the new call letters WVAM. The station will also carry Parkersburg High School football games. The sale of the station and the translators was consummated on October 29, 2020.
