= WCLG-FM =

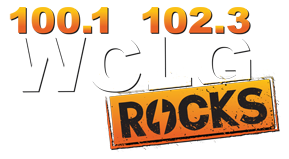
- Morgantown, West Virginia; United States
- Broadcast area: North-Central West Virginia
- Frequency: 100.1 MHz (HD Radio)
- Branding: 100.1 CLG; CLG

Programming
- Format: Active rock
- Affiliations: Compass Media Networks; United Stations Radio Networks

Ownership
- Owner: AJG Radio Corporation; (AJG Corporation)
- Sister stations: WBTQ, WFGM-FM, WPDX-FM, WPDX, WBUC

History
- First air date: September 28, 1974
- Call sign meaning: W C. Leslie Golliday

Technical information
- Licensing authority: FCC
- Facility ID: 6553
- Class: A
- Power: 6,000 watts
- HAAT: 91 meters (299 ft)
- Transmitter coordinates: 39°37′40.0″N 79°58′11.0″W
- Repeater: 102.3 WBTQ (Weston)

Links
- Public license information: Public file; LMS
- Webcast: WCLG-FM Webstream
- Website: WCLG-FM Online

WCLG-FM (100.1 MHz) is an active rock formatted broadcast radio station licensed to Morgantown, West Virginia, serving North-Central West Virginia. WCLG-FM is owned by AJG Corporation licensee.

== History ==
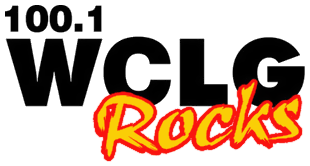
WCLG-FM Previous Logo

On October 18, 1973, Freed Broadcasting Corporation applied for a construction permit to build what would become WCLG-FM.

WCLG-FM began broadcasting on September 28, 1974 simulcasting 70% of sister-station WCLG Top 40 programming and its own progressive rock format. At the time of launch, WCLG-FM broadcast with a power of 3,000 watts. The meaning of the station's callsign comes from the initials of former WCLG owner C. Leslie Golliday. The studios of WCLG-FM have remained in the same location since sister-station WCLG signed on in 1954, 343 High Street in Morgantown.

In 1979, future owner Garry L. Bowers came on board as the station's general manager. In 1980, WCLG-FM took over the Top 40 programming which sister station WCLG had dropped two years earlier, when it switched to a Middle of the Road format. In 1983, WCLG-FM switched to a Contemporary Hit Radio format.

Freed Broadcasting Corporation sold WCLG-FM and sister station WCLG to Bowers Broadcasting Corporation on March 15, 1985 for $715,000.

In 1993, WCLG-FM switched its current Active Rock format. The following year, the station increased its transmitting power to 6,000 watts.

Bowers Broadcasting Corporation owner Garry L. Bowers died on Christmas Eve 2011. On September 25, 2013, Bowers widow Linda K. Bowers assumed control of the company.

== Sale ==
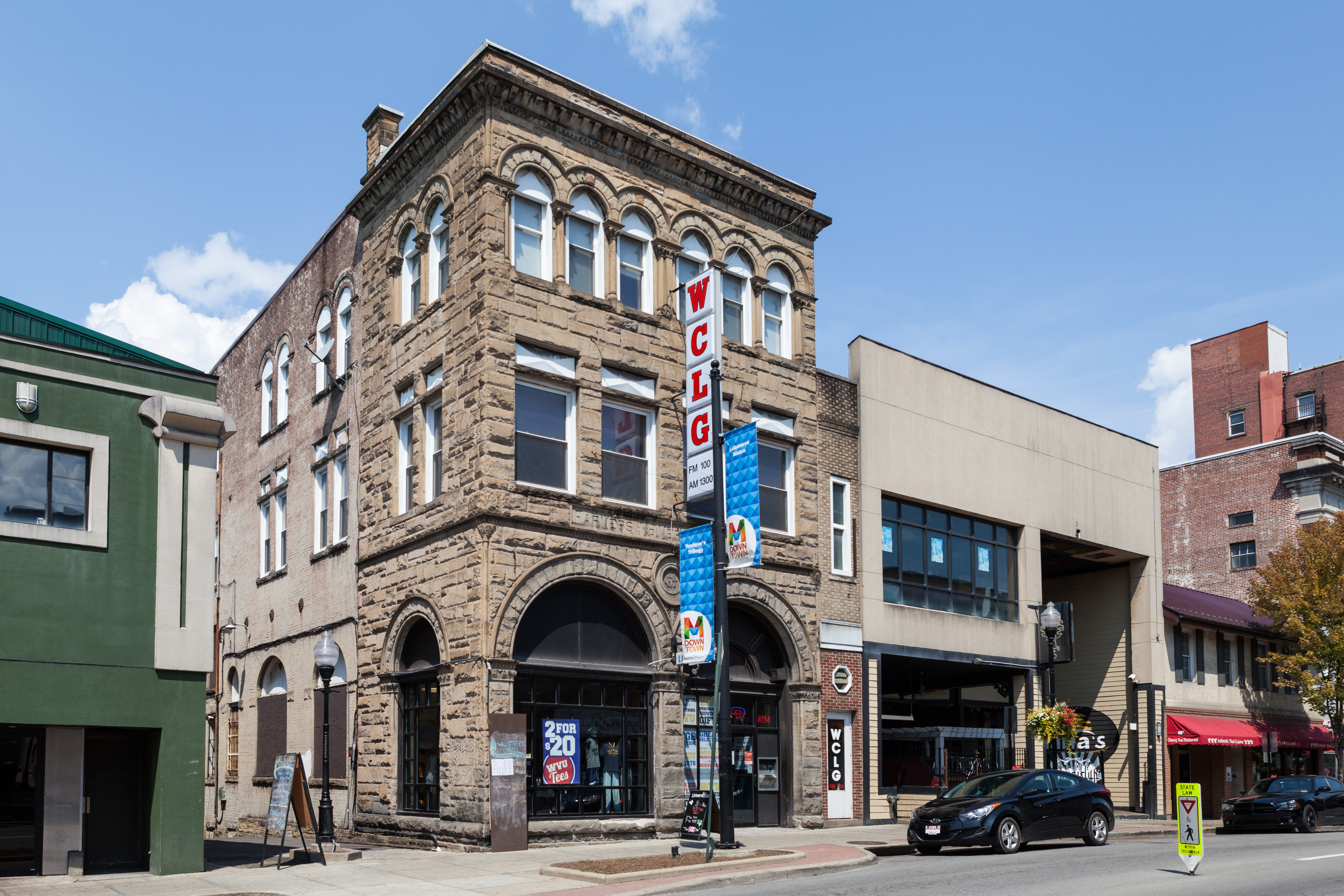
The WCLG studios and sign along High Street in Morgantown, 2015.

On September 26, 2013, Bowers entered into an agreement to sell WCLG-FM and sister station WCLG to AJG Corporation, for $1.8 Million.

On October 21, 2013, the Federal Communications Commission (FCC) rescinded the transfer-of-ownership application after an objection by Joe Potter, Senior Vice President of IMG Sports. Potter contends there is "very close connections and operational control" between AJG Corporation and West Virginia Radio Corporation (now WVRC Media). (WVRC). The co-directors of West Virginia Radio Corporation, John and David Raese, operate AJG Corporation as a trust for their descendents.

Potter's complaint goes on to say that "IMG was close to finalizing a contract to air WVU sports" but was "prevented by the terms of AJG's purchase agreement" which barred Bowers Broadcasting Corporation from "'entering into any contract or agreement' without the consent of AJG".

West Virginia Radio Corporation previously held the rights to West Virginia University sports before losing them to IMG Sports. West Virginia Radio Corporation filed a lawsuit against West Virginia University and IMG Sports, to retain the broadcast rights, which it lost in late August 2013.

The FCC granted the ownership transfer on February 3, 2015 subject to several conditions regarding business relationships and communication between AJG and WVRC. An appeal of the grant conditions was denied by the FCC on September 16, 2015. Bowers Broadcasting subsequently filed applications for extension of the consummation of the transfer on October 23, 2015, January 29, 2016, April 22, 2016, July 22, 2016, and October 17, 2016. The last of these extension requests was denied by the FCC on November 30, 2016, and this denial was appealed on January 10, 2017.

The transfer to AJG Corporation was eventually consummated on September 1, 2017.

== Programming ==
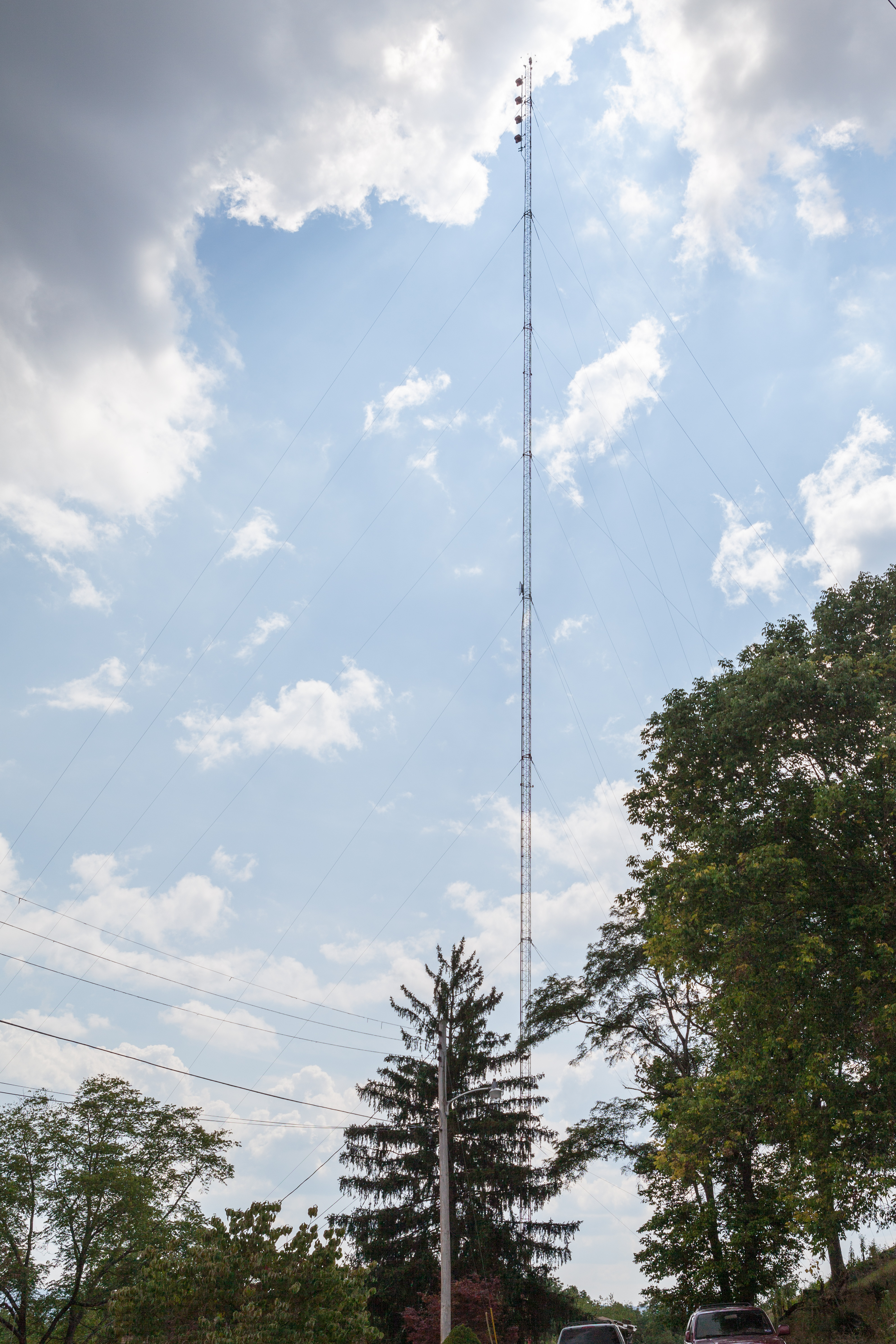
Antenna on Jackson Street in Westover

Weekdays used to begin with the nationally syndicated Lex and Terry Morning Show. In late 2016, the station began its own weekday morning show called "It's Better Than Your Morning Show Show". The station also has a news department which prepares and broadcasts local news reports on weekdays. The rest of the day was filled with local WCLG DJs Marshall, and Jeff Miller, respectively. The station previously aired "The CLG Punk and Ska Show" on Tuesday Nights, featuring local and national punk and ska artists and bands. The show ended on April 15, 2014.

On weekends, WCLG-FM once featured local DJs Whalen, Chuck, Chris, Zee Marie and Jeff Jasper. Weekend programs on WCLG-FM consist of "CLG Homegrown", featuring unsigned local artists; and the nationally syndicated shows "HardDrive with Lou Brutus" and "Floydian Slip" with Craig Bailey, devoted to the band Pink Floyd.

As of Summer 2020, the CLG lineup includes the CLG Morning Show with Marshall and Dave, the CLG Workforce with Ashley, Afternoon Chaos with Chris Chaos, and Dave Sweitzer, your Nighttime Rocker.

== See also ==
- WCLG-FM's Studios on Google StreetView
- WCLG-FM's Tower on Google StreetView
