= WPDX-FM =

Coordinates: 39.256°N 80.113°W

- Clarksburg, West Virginia; United States
- Broadcast area: North-Central West Virginia
- Frequency: 104.9 MHz
- Branding: "Superstar Country 104-9 and 92-1 WPDX"

Programming
- Format: Classic country

Ownership
- Owner: AJG Radio Corporation; (AJG Corporation)
- Sister stations: WFGM-FM, WCLG-FM,WBTQ, WPDX, WBUC

History
- First air date: 1948 (on 95.1)
- Former frequencies: 95.1 MHz (1948–1974)

Technical information
- Licensing authority: FCC
- Facility ID: 68303
- Class: B1
- ERP: 7,400 watts
- HAAT: 182 meters
- Repeater: 1300 WPDX (AM) (Morgantown)

Links
- Public license information: Public file; LMS
- Webcast: Listen Live
- Website: 1049wpdx.com

WPDX-FM (104.9 MHz) is a classic country formatted broadcast radio station licensed to Clarksburg, West Virginia, serving the North-Central West Virginia area. WPDX is owned and operated under their AJG Corporation licensee.

== History ==
WPDX-FM began broadcasting March 11, 1948, on 95.1 MHz. The station was licensed to the Clarksburg Broadcasting Corporation.

Previous logo
