= WPDX (AM) =

Radio station in Morgantown, West Virginia

Simulcast of WPDX-FM, Clarksburg, WV
- Morgantown, West Virginia; United States
- Broadcast area: Monongalia County
- Frequency: 1300 kHz
- Branding: Superstar Country 104-9 and 92-1 WPDX

Programming
- Format: Classic country

Ownership
- Owner: AJG Radio Corporation; (AJG Corporation)
- Sister stations: WCLG-FM,WBTQ, WFGM-FM, WPDX-FM, WBUC

History
- First air date: December 27, 1954
- Former call signs: WCLG (1954–2019); WFGM (2019–2023); WCLG (2023)

Technical information
- Licensing authority: FCC
- Facility ID: 3
- Class: D
- Power: 2,500 watts (day); 44 watts (night)
- Transmitter coordinates: 39°37′40.0″N 79°58′11.0″W
- Translator: 92.1 W221DR (Morgantown)

Links
- Public license information: Public file; LMS
- Webcast: Listen live
- Website: www.1049wpdx.com

WPDX (1300 AM) is a commercial radio station licensed to Morgantown, West Virginia, carrying a classic country format simulcasting WPDX-FM in Clarksburg. The station serves Morgantown and Monongalia County. WPDX is owned and operated under their AJG Corporation licensee. In addition to standard analog transmission, WPDX is relayed over low-power translator W221DR (92.1 FM) in Morgantown.

Launched on December 27, 1954, WPDX signed on as WCLG with broadcasting a "music-news" format. The station was originally intended to be a part of a statewide network of stations. Over the years, the station was subject to an equal-time rule complaint and was awarded for its coverage of the Farmington Number 9 mine disaster. A planned 2013 sale of WCLG (and its sister-station WCLG-FM) was halted by the Federal Communications Commission (FCC) due to a complaint that the company buying the stations, AJG Corporation, had close connections with another local broadcaster, West Virginia Radio Corporation (now WVRC Media). The sale was ultimately allowed to proceed and was completed in 2015.

Many different formats were heard on the station during the 1970s and 1980s, with its current format launched in 2023.

== History ==
=== Pre-broadcast ===
Martinsburg, West Virginia, businessman C. Leslie Golliday filed the initial application for the station with the FCC on September 1, 1954. In the application, Golliday estimated construction costs at $13,608, with a first year operation cost of $36,000. Golliday estimated an initial revenue of $60,000.

As WCLG, the station began testing equipment during the week of December 19, 1954, and filed its construction permit application two days later. WCLG broadcast for the first time on December 27, 1954. The station initially had a "music-news" format, using the Associated Press news service.

In its early days, WCLG was a daytime-only broadcaster, with a power of 500 watts. Owner C. Leslie Golliday used his initials for the station's call sign. Golliday, who also owned Martinsburg's WEPM, envisioned a network of stations across the state of West Virginia.

WCLG was officially granted its broadcast license by the FCC on January 18, 1955. Throughout its existence, the station's studios have been at 343 High Street in Morgantown.

=== History since launch ===
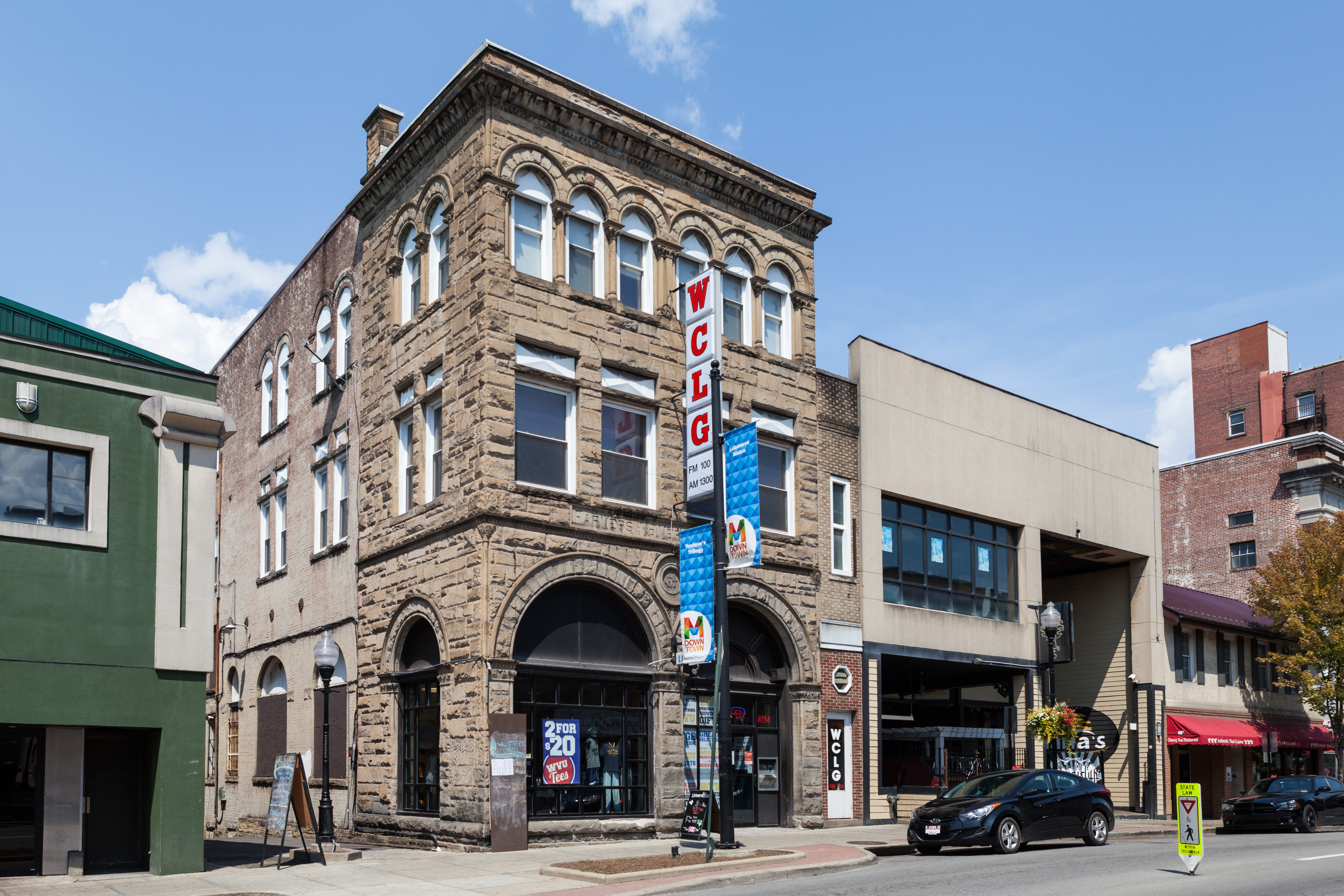
The WCLG studios and sign along High Street in Morgantown, 2015.

On March 10, 1955, WCLG filed an application to increase its power to 1,000 watts, proposing to continue daytime-only broadcasts. The application was granted on September 28, 1955. In 1958, future owner Garry L. Bowers joined the station as an announcer. WCLG was bought by Freed Broadcasting Corporation for $67,000 on December 19, 1959.

In May 1960, Stanley R. Cox, a candidate in the Republican primary election for the House of Representatives, filed an equal-time rule complaint against WCLG. Cox objected that the station gave his opponent, Sheriff Charles Whiston, a five-minute-long segment called "Sheriff's Office Calling". In the show, "arrests and other activities of interest are recited"; it ended with a 30-second "thought for the day". Cox had been refused equal time by the station "on the ground that the program is a public service feature." The FCC upheld the complaint, deciding the content of the program was "determined by Sheriff Whiston and not by the station" and that remarks made by the sheriff were of an editorial nature. Whiston would go on to win the primary over Cox by about 300 votes.

The station's coverage of the explosion at the Farmington Number 9 mine, which killed 78, earned the station the Associated Press Radio-Television Association (APRTA) in early 1969. The station earned another APRTA award for "Outstanding News Coverage" the following year.

Sister station WCLG-FM began broadcasting on September 28, 1974. Also, in 1974, WCLG began a Top 40 format. Another change in format took place in 1978, with middle-of-the-road (MOR) music taking the place of Top 40. WCLG became part of the NBC Radio Network on October 2, 1978. In 1979, Bowers became the station's general manager.

WCLG applied for another broadcasting power increase on November 4, 1980, to 2,500 watts, but remained a daytime-only station. The station added oldies to its MOR music format in 1983.

Logo used by WCLG under the branding "Oldies 13AM".

In 1985, WCLG switched formats to a soft adult contemporary playlist. On March 15 of that year, Freed Broadcasting Corporation sold WCLG-FM and sister station WCLG to Bowers Broadcasting Corporation, owned by Garry Bowers, for $715,000.

The station changed formats again in 1988, this time to classic hits. Two years later, WCLG began broadcasting during the nighttime with 44 watts of power, enough to cover the city of Morgantown. Another format change took place in 1991, when the station switched to golden oldies using the "Pure Gold" format from Satellite Music Network (now Cumulus Media Networks).

Bowers Broadcasting Corporation owner Garry L. Bowers died on December 24, 2011. On September 25, 2013, control of the company was transferred to Bowers' widow, Linda K. Bowers.

=== Sale ===
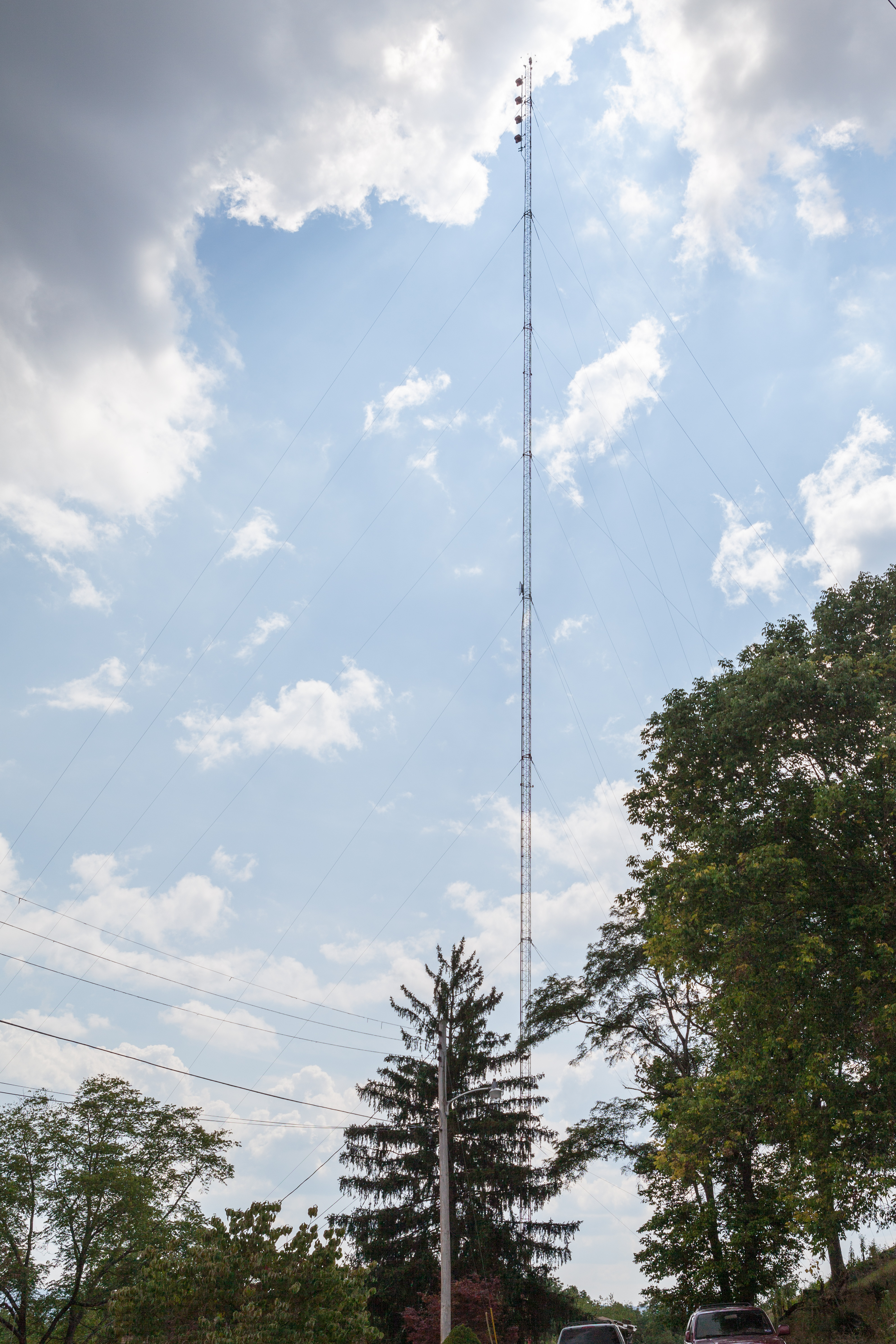
Antenna on Jackson Street in Westover

On September 26, 2013, Linda Bowers entered into an agreement to sell WCLG and sister station WCLG-FM to AJG Corporation, for $1.8 million. Bowers also entered into a time brokerage agreement, allowing AJG to operate the station prior to the close of the sale.

The Federal Communications Commission (FCC) rescinded the transfer-of-ownership application on October 21, 2013, after an objection by Joe Potter, Senior Vice President of IMG Sports. Potter contended there were "very close connections and operational control" between AJG Corporation and West Virginia Radio Corporation (now WVRC Media). (WVRC) and AJG's purchase of WCLG-AM/FM would be "possibly in violation of FCC regulations." The co-directors of West Virginia Radio Corporation, John and David Raese, operate AJG Corporation as a trust for their descendants.

Potter's complaint went on to say that "IMG was close to finalizing a contract to air WVU sports" but was "prevented by the terms of AJG's purchase agreement", which barred Bowers Broadcasting Corporation from "'entering into any contract or agreement' without the consent of AJG".

West Virginia Radio Corporation previously held the rights to West Virginia University sports before losing them to IMG Sports. West Virginia Radio Corporation filed a lawsuit against West Virginia University and IMG Sports to retain the broadcast rights, which it lost in late August 2013.

The FCC granted the ownership transfer on February 3, 2015 subject to several conditions regarding business relationships and communication between AJG and WVRC. Multiple appeals were filed in 2015, 2016, and 2017, with them ultimately being denied by the FCC.

The transfer to AJG Corporation was eventually consummated on September 1, 2017, at which point WCLG changed its format from classic hits to adult contemporary, branded as "Morgan 92.1".

=== Post sale ===
On November 29, 2019, the station changed its call sign to WFGM. On December 5, 2019, WCLG changed its format from adult contemporary to contemporary Christian, branded as "The New Journey FGM". On March 6, 2023, the station changed its call sign back to the original WCLG. On August 29, 2023, the station changed its call sign again, this time to WPDX. In September 2023, the station flipped to classic country as a simulcast of WPDX-FM.

== Former staff ==
Jim Slade, a Morgantown native, was hired as news director when the station launched in 1954. Slade was later heard on WOWO and WIND, covering the assassination of Martin Luther King Jr. (April 1968) and of Robert F. Kennedy (June 1968) on the latter station. On the Mutual Broadcasting System and at ABC News he covered space-related stories.

Country-music performer Charlie Arnett hosted the Old Trading Post program on WCLG in 1959. Arnett's later career took him to the CBS Radio program Renfro Valley Folks and to the Tampa, Florida, station WDAE.

Eugene Cottilli started as sports director at WCLG, before becoming the press secretary to Senator Howard Metzenbaum of Ohio. As of 2013, Cottilli is the Congressional Media Liaison for the United States Department of Commerce.

== Translator ==
In addition to the main station, WPDX is relayed by an FM translator to widen its broadcast area.

Call sign	Frequency	City of license	FID	ERP (W)	HAAT	Class	FCC info
W221DR	92.1 FM	Morgantown, West Virginia	139879	240	111 m (364 ft)	D	LMS
