= WFGM-FM =

- Barrackville, West Virginia; United States
- Broadcast area: North Central West Virginia
- Frequency: 93.1 MHz
- Branding: 93.1 WFGM

Programming
- Format: Classic hits
- Affiliations: West Virginia MetroNews

Ownership
- Owner: AJG Radio Corporation; (AJG Corporation)
- Sister stations: WBTQ, WCLG-FM, WPDX-FM, WPDX, WBUC

History
- First air date: July 1993
- Former call signs: WVCW (1991–1993); WMMN-FM (1993–1995); WVUC (1995–2003); WBVQ (2003–2007)

Technical information
- Licensing authority: FCC
- Facility ID: 21170
- Class: A
- ERP: 2,600 watts
- HAAT: 151 meters (495 ft)
- Transmitter coordinates: 39°26′40.0″N 79°59′10.0″W

Links
- Public license information: Public file; LMS

WFGM-FM (93.1 MHz) is a radio station licensed to Barrackville, West Virginia, serving North Central West Virginia. WFGM-FM is owned by WVRC Media and operated under their AJG Corporation licensee.

== History ==
On December 5, 2019, WFGM-FM changed their format from country to contemporary Christian, branded as "The New Journey FGM".

In September 2023, the station flipped to hot adult contemporary branded as Fun 93.1.

On December 26, 2024, WFGM-FM changed their format from hot adult contemporary to classic hits, branded as "93.1 WFGM".

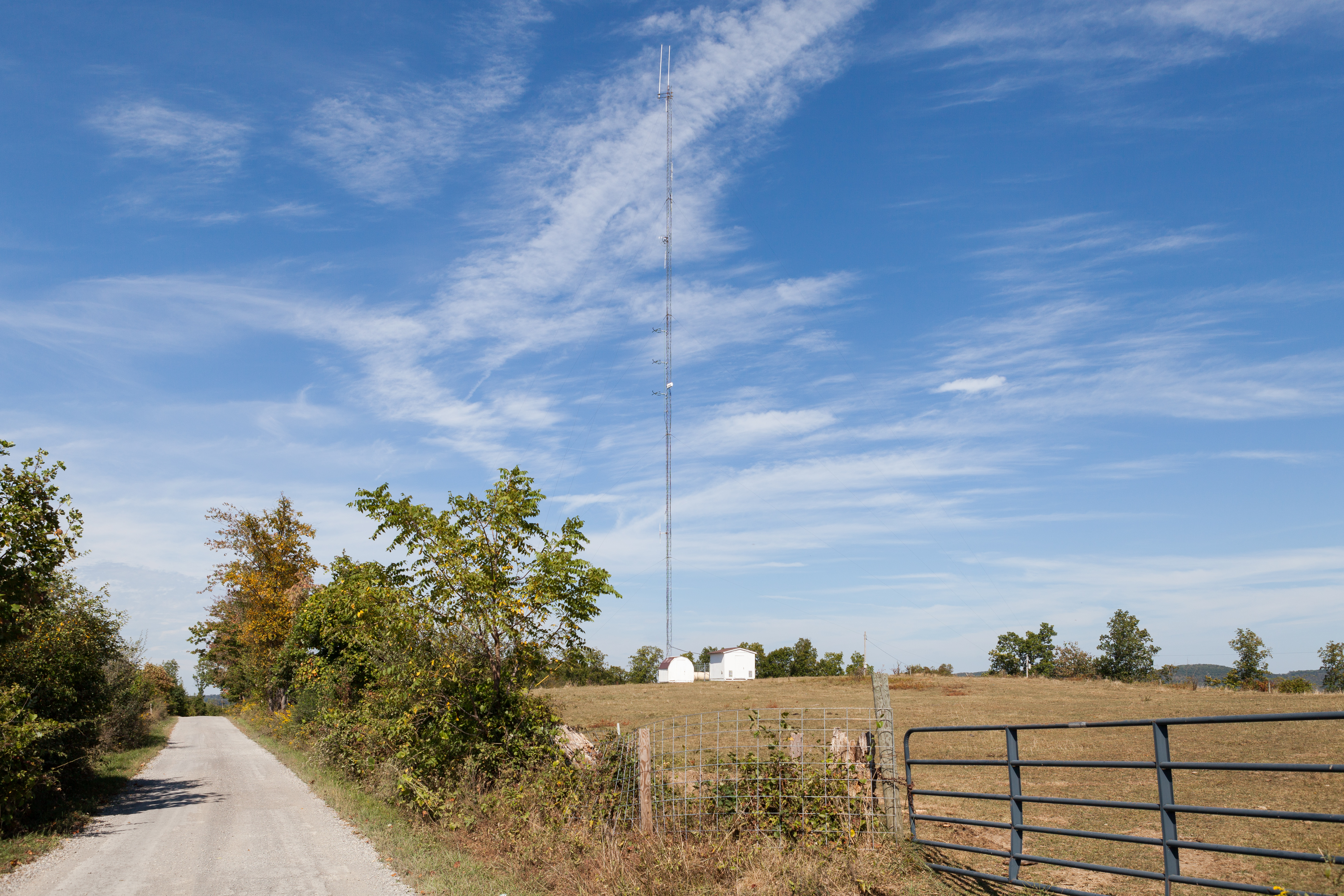
Tower, east of Fairmont, West Virginia
