= WBTQ =

Simulcasting WCLG-FM Morgantown
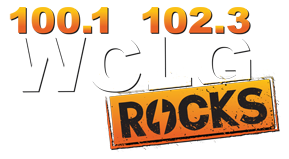
- Weston, West Virginia; United States
- Broadcast area: North Central West Virginia
- Frequency: 102.3 MHz
- Branding: 100.1 & 102.3 CLG

Programming
- Format: Active rock
- Affiliations: Compass Media Networks; United Stations Radio Networks

Ownership
- Owner: AJG Radio Corporation; (AJG Corporation)
- Sister stations: WFGM-FM, WCLG-FM, WPDX-FM, WPDX, WBUC

History
- First air date: August 29, 1972 (as WSSN)
- Former call signs: WSSN (1972–2002); WFBY (2002–2018)

Technical information
- Licensing authority: FCC
- Facility ID: 71690
- Class: B1
- ERP: 10,000 watts
- HAAT: 155 meters (509 ft)
- Transmitter coordinates: 39°1′27.0″N 80°19′16.0″W

Links
- Public license information: Public file; LMS
- Webcast: Listen Live
- Website: WBTQ Online

WBTQ (102.3 FM) is an active rock formatted broadcast radio station licensed to Weston, West Virginia, serving North Central West Virginia. WBTQ is owned and operated by AJG Corporation .

On January 31, 2018, the then-WFBY changed their format from classic rock (which moved to 93.5 FM Buckhannon) to a simulcast of active rock-formatted WCLG-FM 100.1 Morgantown under new WBTQ calls.
