= WKAZ =

WKAZ can refer to:

- WKAZ (AM), a radio station (680 AM) located in Charleston, West Virginia, United States
- WRVZ (FM), a radio station (107.3 FM) located in Miami, West Virginia, which held the call signs WKAZ and WKAZ-FM from 1992 to 2023
- WJYP, a radio station (1300 AM) located in St. Albans, West Virginia, which held the call sign WKAZ from 1983 to 1992
- WBES, a radio station (950 AM) located in Charleston, West Virginia, which held the call sign WKAZ from 1957 to 1983
