= WRVZ =

WRVZ may refer to:

- WRVZ (FM), a radio station (107.3 FM) licensed to serve Miami, West Virginia, United States
- WCST-FM, a radio station (98.7 FM) licensed to serve Pocatalico, West Virginia, which held the call sign WRVZ from 1994 to 2023
