= WSWW (AM) =

Radio station in Charleston, West Virginia

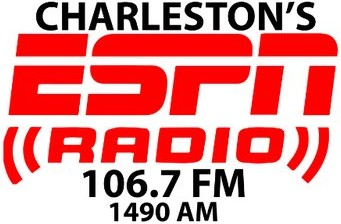
- Charleston, West Virginia; United States
- Broadcast area: Metro Charleston
- Frequency: 1490 kHz
- Branding: Charleston's ESPN Radio

Programming
- Format: Sports
- Affiliations: AP Radio; ESPN Radio

Ownership
- Owner: WVRC Media; (West Virginia Radio Corporation of Charleston)
- Sister stations: WCHS; WCST-FM; WKAZ; WKWS; WRVZ; WVAF

History
- First air date: September 24, 1939
- Former call signs: WGKV (1939–1958); WHMS (1958–1961); WTGR (1961); WHMS (1961–1962); WGKV (1962–1969); WXIT (1969–1990); WCZR (1990–1997)
- Former frequencies: 1500 kHz (1939–1941)

Technical information
- Licensing authority: FCC
- Facility ID: 19534
- Class: C
- Power: 1,000 watts (unlimited)
- Transmitter coordinates: 38°21′28″N 81°37′00″W
- Translator: 106.7 W294CL (Charleston)

Links
- Public license information: Public file; LMS
- Website: charlestonespn.com

WSWW (1490 kHz, "Charleston's ESPN Radio") is an AM radio station airing a sports radio format in Charleston, West Virginia, United States. The station is an affiliate of ESPN Radio and is owned by WVRC Media. The station has a power of 1,000 watts. It is also heard on FM translator W294CL (106.7 FM) in and around Charleston.

WSWW is promoted as part of the "WCHS News Network", which also features co-owned news/talk WCHS (580 AM, 96.5 and 104.5 FM).

== History ==
=== WGKV ===
The Kanawha Valley Broadcasting Company established WGKV on September 24, 1939, broadcasting with 100 watts on 1500 kHz from a transmitter at Coal Branch Heights. The station moved to 1490 kHz on March 29, 1941, as a result of NARBA. Not long after signing on, the station joined NBC, the network's first affiliate in southern West Virginia. The station survived a 1941 fire in its studios and control room, all while announcer George Kent was able to keep the station on the air as firefighters fought the blaze.

WGKV applied to upgrade to 250 watts in December 1941, but it would have to wait for World War II to end before the Federal Communications Commission (FCC) granted the increase on January 16, 1946. During that time, however, more serious problems emerged that had the station in a fight for its legal life. In late 1943, Worth Kramer, who was about to be inducted into the Army, filed to relinquish control in Kanawha Valley, and the FCC ordered a hearing on alleged "hidden ownership". The war would soon take a larger toll on WGKV when four station employees were called to serve at the same time on February 1, 1944, leaving the outlet without its manager, women's director, promotions manager, and replacement, who all joined the armed forces and the Red Cross. Even when the war ended, the station's license renewal remained pending at the FCC; the hidden ownership allegations, concerning John A. Kennedy, had also put the license of WGKV's only competitor, WCHS, in doubt. A former secretary testified that Kennedy had secretly paid original station owner W. A. Carroll to build WGKV and asked that his involvement be concealed.

In December 1947, the FCC proposed denying WGKV a renewal of its license. The station appealed, calling the action an unjust punishment, as WCHS had its license renewed at the same time. The station charged that new proposed owners, Eugene R. Custer and Richard M. Venable, had relied on the advice of Worth Kramer and his counsel, in a fashion similar to that charged against WCHS. The commission ultimately approved the license renewal and related transfers of control, finding that Venable and Custer were "almost wholly ignorant of the field of radio broadcasting" and of FCC regulations, relying entirely on Kramer and counsel and later being cooperative with the hearing proceeding.

WGKV launched an FM companion, WGKV-FM 98.5, on September 24, 1949, marking its 10th anniversary of broadcasting. The FM station operated for more than five years and was deleted at the station's request on November 8, 1954. Earlier that year, an entirely new ownership group, associated with WSAZ (930 AM) and WSAZ-TV channel 3 at Huntington, had acquired the station from Venable and associates for $75,000.

=== WHMS and second stint as WGKV ===
In 1956, WSAZ sold WGKV for $90,000 to Jake and Walter Evans; the sale was necessary because WSAZ was buying WKNA (1240 AM) and WKNA-FM 97.5. The station was relocated to the Professional Building after 16 years in the Empire Building, and after a second sale to Joseph Brechner, the station changed its call letters to WHMS on February 1, 1958; letterhead boasted that the calls stood for "West Virginia's Hit Music Station". The new designation came with a revamped popular music format. Robert V. Barron, a Charleston native who went on to be a TV and film director in Hollywood, worked at several local radio stations, including WGKV/WHMS.

Edgar Clinton bought WHMS in 1961. The license carried the call letters WTGR from July to November of that year, but the station continued to promote itself as WHMS. The call letters were retired again on February 20, 1962, this time reverting to the former WGKV call sign. The next year, it was approved to increase daytime power to 1,000 watts.

=== WXIT ===
In 1968, David Steere of Kalamazoo, Michigan, acquired WGKV for $250,000. Steere took over on January 15, 1969, and on February 10, WGKV became WXIT. The station billed itself as "The POPular Sound in Charleston", airing a Top 40 format. It aggressively competed with WKAZ (950 AM), a 5,000-watt outlet, for the youth audience.

Kanawha Broadcasting Corporation acquired WXIT in 1978. The station was sold to Empire Broadcasting System, Inc., in 1987; separately, Empire bought WVCM (107.3 FM), licensed to nearby Miami.

=== WCZR and WSWW ===
WXIT became WCZR in 1990, named for and utilizing the satellite Z Rock syndicated network. Two years later, it flipped to talk, adding gospel and R&B music in 1994. It was when they picked up the R&B format that they changed their tag to "Crazy 1490".

In 1995, the station dropped its talk programming and went full-time gospel/R&B, under a new LMA with Kingdom Broadcasting. Kingdom was owned by local Black pastor Matthew J. Watts.

In 1997, West Virginia Radio Corporation, which already owned four stations in Charleston, acquired WCZR and WKAZ-FM for $2.14 million. The station flipped to sports and adopted the call letters WSWW, going by the name "3WS".
