= WVAF =

Charleston, West Virginia; United States
- Broadcast area: Charleston MSA
- Frequency: 99.9 MHz
- Branding: V-100

Programming
- Format: Adult contemporary

Ownership
- Owner: WVRC Media; (West Virginia Radio Corporation of Charleston)
- Sister stations: WCHS, WCST-FM, WKAZ, WKWS, WRVZ, WSWW

History
- First air date: February 1, 1965
- Call sign meaning: West VirginiA FM

Technical information
- Licensing authority: FCC
- Facility ID: 71663
- Class: B
- ERP: 24,500 watts
- HAAT: 215 meters (705 ft)
- Transmitter coordinates: 38°16′25.4″N 81°31′26.4″W

Links
- Public license information: Public file; LMS
- Webcast: Listen Live
- Website: v100.fm

WVAF (99.9 FM) is an adult contemporary radio station in the Charleston, West Virginia, market area. The station broadcasts with an ERP of 24,500 watts. WVAF is ranked third in the Arbitron ratings for the Charleston Metropolitan Statistical Area market, and is currently owned by WVRC Media.

== History ==
WVAF's license was granted on December 24, 1963, but it did not sign on until February 1, 1965. Although V100 has broadcast the AC format for most of its existence, it has dabbled in other formats. It was previously a rock station thru most of the 1970s, and in September 1998, took on a contemporary hit radio format until October 1999.

It was also previously owned by Capital Broadcasting Corporation and was the FM sister of WCAW-AM 680 until it was sold to West Virginia Radio Corporation. In the late 1990s, V100 played songs from the 70s such as Elton John & Kiki Dee's "Don't Go Breaking My Heart", Eagles' "Hotel California", Bee Gees "Stayin' Alive" and many more. By 2013, V100 dropped all 70s songs from its playlist and started to focus on more of a hot AC format without the hard rock or rap. It averages two or three songs from the 80s an hour, with mostly 90s, 2000s and current hits.

The All 80s Lunch with Steve Bishop is broadcast on weekdays at noon and plays music from 1980 to 1989. The John Tesh Radio Show is broadcast early Sunday mornings from 4 am to 9 am. Backtrax USA with Kidd Kelly (the 80s and 90s versions) is broadcast from 8 pm to midnight on Saturdays, and Tom Kent's radio program Lovin Life, Livin The '80s from 7 pm to midnight on Sundays. On Sunday, the station broadcasts Sonrise from 9am to 11am.
