= WLZT =

WLZT may refer to:

- WLZT (FM), a radio station (94.1 FM) licensed to serve Worthington, Indiana, United States
- WODC, a radio station (93.3 FM) licensed to serve Ashville, Ohio, United States, which held the call sign WLZT from 2004 to 2011
- WRVZ (FM), a radio station (107.3 FM) licensed to serve Miami, West Virginia, United States, which held the call sign WLZT from 1988 to 1992
