= William S. Gilliland Log Cabin and Cemetery =

Historic house in West Virginia, United States

- U.S. National Register of Historic Places
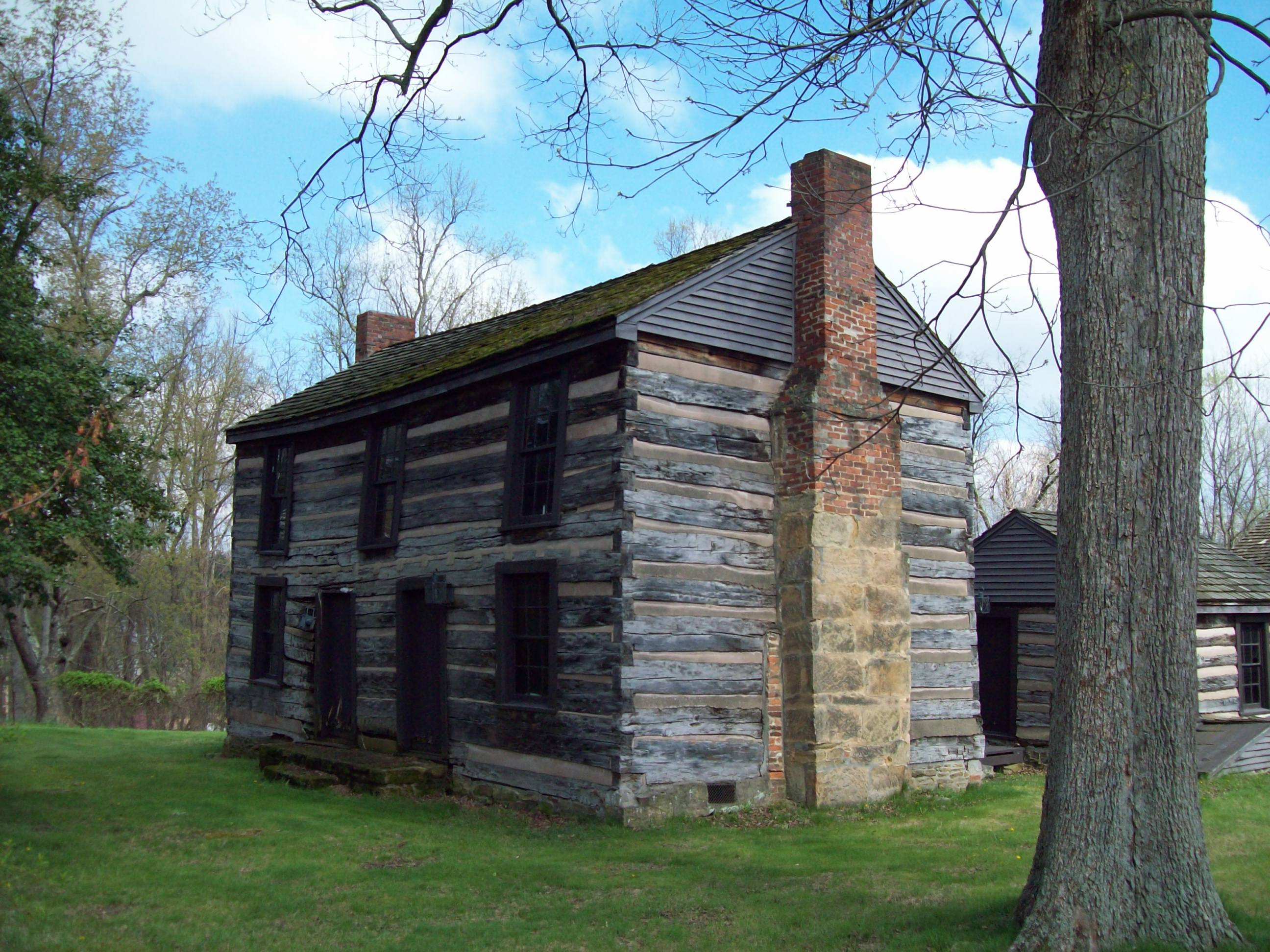
- Gilliland Cabin, April 2009

- Location within West Virginia Location within the United States
- Location: Louden Heights and Bridge Rd., Charleston, West Virginia
- Coordinates: 38°19′47″N 81°38′48″W
- Area: 1.5 acres (0.61 ha)
- Built: 1847
- Architect: Miller Construction Co.
- MPS: South Hills MRA
- NRHP reference No.: 84000407
- Added to NRHP: October 26, 1984

William S. Gilliland Log Cabin and Cemetery is a historic home and family cemetery located in Charleston, West Virginia. It was the home and graveyard of one of Charleston's oldest families, the Gillilands. They built the log cabins and lived there until selling it to the Neale family in 1868.

It was listed on the National Register of Historic Places in 1984 as part of the South Hills Multiple Resource Area.
