= WCHS (AM) =

News/talk radio station in Charleston, West Virginia, United States

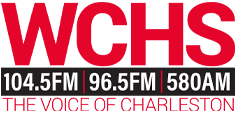
- Charleston, West Virginia; United States
- Broadcast area: Southern West Virginia; Southwestern West Virginia
- Frequency: 580 kHz
- Branding: 580 WCHS

Programming
- Format: News/talk/sports
- Affiliations: ABC News Radio; NBC News Radio; Westwood One; West Virginia MetroNews

Ownership
- Owner: WVRC Media; (West Virginia Radio Corporation of Charleston)
- Sister stations: WKAZ, WCST-FM, WKWS, WRVZ, WSWW, WSWW-FM, WVAF

History
- First air date: September 15, 1927 as WOBU
- Former call signs: WOBU (1927–34)
- Call sign meaning: Charleston

Technical information
- Licensing authority: FCC
- Facility ID: 71660
- Class: B
- Power: 5,000 watts
- Transmitter coordinates: 38°21′51.3″N 81°46′4.55″W
- Translators: 96.5 W243DR (Charleston); 104.5 W283AQ (Cross Lanes)

Links
- Public license information: Public file; LMS
- Webcast: Listen Live
- Website: wchsnetwork.com

WCHS (580 kHz) is a news/talk/sports formatted broadcast radio station licensed to Charleston, West Virginia, serving Southern West Virginia and Southwestern West Virginia. WCHS is owned and operated by WVRC Media.

WCHS is the Primary Entry Point Emergency Alert System station for West Virginia.

== History ==
WCHS signed on September 15, 1927, as WOBU, operating at 1120 kilohertz with 50 watts of power; it moved to 580 kilohertz the following year. The station was founded by Walter Fredericks, owner of the Charleston Radio Supply Company, who launched WOBU to sell more radios; he would sell the station in 1930. The call sign was changed to WCHS in 1933; by 1940, it was operating at its current power of 5,000 watts.

One popular program on the station was The Old Farm Hour. Country musicians Bill Cox and the Kessinger Brothers were among the performers on the show.

WCHS was acquired by the West Virginia Radio Corporation in 1992, and its format was changed from oldies to its current talk radio format; the oldies format would move to WKAZ-FM (107.3).

== FM translators ==
In addition to the main station broadcasting at 580 kHz, WCHS is relayed by two FM translators which are used to widen its broadcast area.

Broadcast translators for WCHS
Call sign	Frequency	City of license	FID	ERP (W)	Class	FCC info
W243DR	96.5 FM	Charleston, West Virginia	141152	250	D	LMS
W283AQ	104.5 FM	Cross Lanes, West Virginia	157126	250	D	LMS

== Programming ==
WCHS is the flagship station of the statewide West Virginia MetroNews network. Programming heard on WCHS consists of local and national news, talk and sports programs. The station's weekday morning schedule begins with the nationally syndicated "America in the Morning". "The Morning News" hosted by West Virginia MetroNews anchors Chris Lawrence and Shauna Johnson follows. A locally produced "Ask The Expert" then airs, followed by "MetroNews Talkline" hosted by Hoppy Kercheval.

The weekday afternoon lineup beings with the nationally syndicated Rush Limbaugh Show. "MetroNews Hotline" and "MetroNews Sportsline", hosted by Dave Weekley and Tony Caridi respectively, round out the afternoon. Various sports programs air in the evenings, with Dave Ramsey Show and "The Jim Bohannon Show" rounding out the night. Red Eye Radio is heard during the overnight hours.

The weekend lineup includes nationally syndicated shows from John Batchelor and Kim Komando. "West Virginia Outdoors" and "Sunday Sportsline", hosted by Chris Lawrence and Travis Jones respectively, are also heard. "The Don Nehlen and Bob Pruett Show" also airs on WCHS. The program is hosted by former West Virginia Mountaineers football head coach Don Nehlen and former Marshall University football head coach Bob Pruett.

Various programs, produced by West Virginia MetroNews, cover high school sports either live or with highlights during the week. The "MetroNews High School Scoreboard" airs highlights of games already played or to-be-played around the state. "High School Sportsline" is a mid-week call-in show, hosted by Garrett Cullen, exclusively about high school sports. "High School Game Night" is a live Friday evening program which features continuous score updates, interviews, and analysis.

WCHS is also an affiliate of the Cincinnati Reds Radio Network.

== Awards ==
A 1942 Peabody Award for Outstanding Public Service by a Regional Station for "The Home Front," a twice-weekly feature.

A 2007 National Edward R. Murrow Award, in the category of "Continuing Coverage", for their reporting on the Sago Mine disaster in Sago, West Virginia.

The station was presented with two 2011 Regional Edward R. Murrow Awards. The first, in the category of "Breaking News Coverage", was given for the station's coverage of the Upper Big Branch Mine disaster in Montcoal, West Virginia. The second, in the category of "Audio News Documentary", was for "The Life of U.S. Senator Robert C. Byrd".

In 2011, the station was presented with a National Edward R. Murrow Award, for their Upper Big Branch Mine disaster coverage. WCHS, along with four other stations, were nominated for the 2011 Marconi Radio Award for "News/Talk Station of the Year" by the National Association of Broadcasters. WSB in Atlanta, however, won the award.

In 2014, WCHS anchors and reports Chris Lawrence, Fred Persinger, Jeff Jenkins, Shauna Johnson, and Hoppy Kercheval were presented with various awards at that year's West Virginia Broadcasters Association "Excellence in Broadcasting Awards".

In 2015, the station was again presented with two Regional Edward R. Murrow Awards, one for "Overall Excellence" and the other for "Best Newscast".
