= Clay Center (Charleston, West Virginia) =

Coordinates: 38.34811°N 81.6294°W

The Clay Center for the Arts and Sciences of West Virginia

- The Clay Center in 2015

General information
- Location: 1 Clay Square, Charleston, West Virginia 25301
- Construction started: 1999
- Opened: 2003
- Owner: The City of Charleston

Technical details
- Size: 240,000-square-foot (22,000 m^{2})

Website
- Official website

The Clay Center in Charleston, West Virginia, is a 240,000-square-foot (22,000 m^{2}) facility dedicated to promoting performing arts, visual arts, and the sciences.

== History ==
In 1999 The Clay Center, named after West Virginia philanthropists Buckner and Lyell Clay of the Clay Foundation, started construction. Four years later in 2003, it opened its doors to the public.

== Features ==
=== The Avampato Discovery Museum ===
The Avampato Discovery Museum features two floors of interactive science exhibits and an art gallery. Science gallery themes include creativity and engineering; sound, light, and color; energy and magnetism; earth science; health and wellness; and a special area for children aged five and under. The Museum's art gallery features selections from its permanent collections and traveling exhibitions.

The Caperton Planetarium and Theater is part of the Museum and presents planetarium shows and large-format films on its giant domed screen. Admission to the Theater is in addition to the regular Museum ticket.

=== Juliet Art Museum ===
The Juliet Art Museum hosts traveling exhibits from artists and museums nationwide and exhibits featuring work from a permanent collection, providing visitors with completely new experiences every few months. The Museum offers a large variety of educational programs including tours through the art galleries and workshops.

=== Other features ===
- The Maier Foundation Performance Hall, an 1,883-seat theater with exceptional acoustics and sight lines
- The Walker Theater, a black-box theater which can accommodate between 150 – 200 people depending upon the set-up
