= Edgewood Historic District (Charleston, West Virginia) =

Historic district in West Virginia, United States

- U.S. National Register of Historic Places
- U.S. Historic district
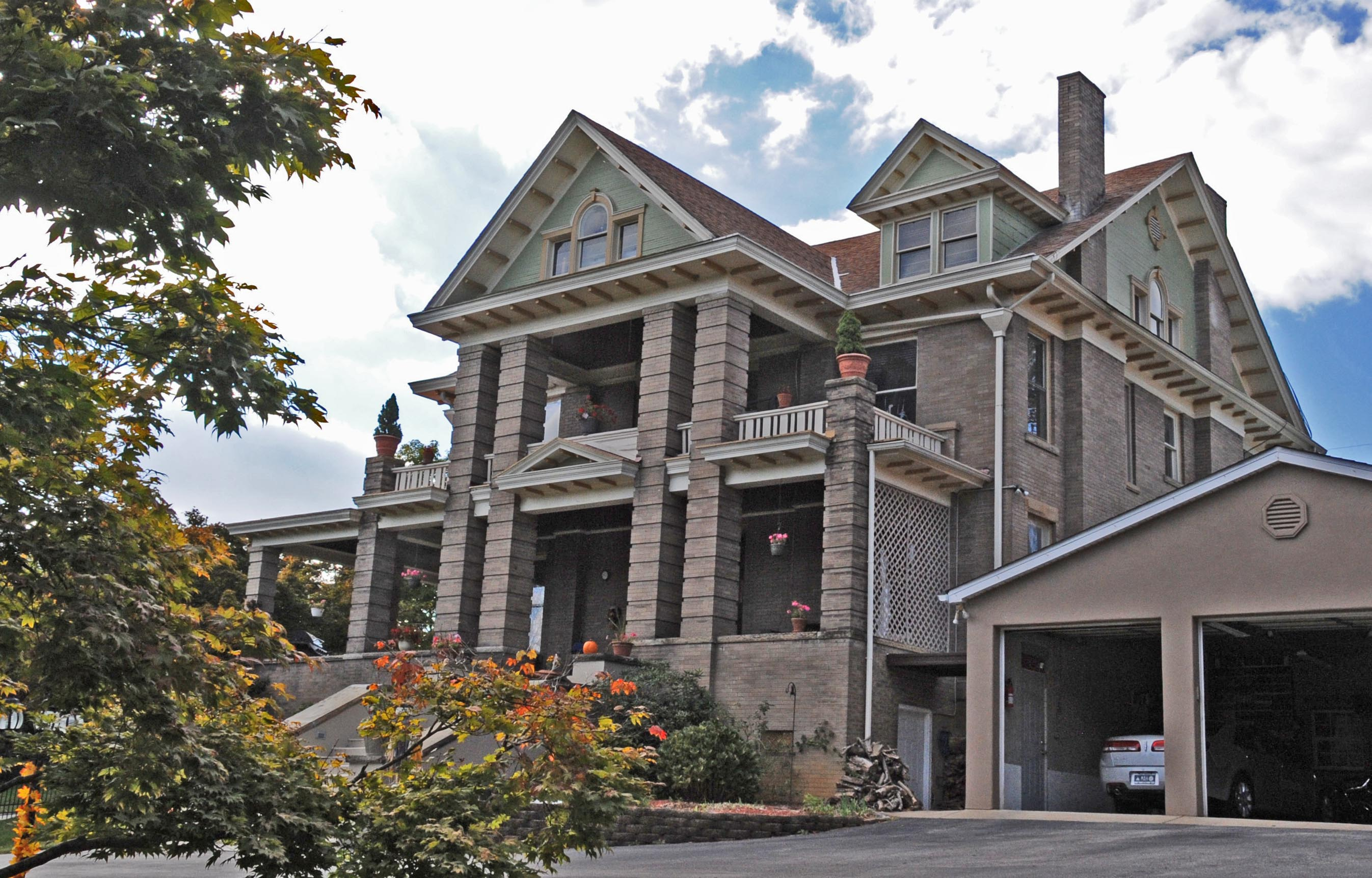

- Location within West Virginia Location within the United States
- Location: Roughly bounded by Edgewood Dr., Highland, Beech, Chester, and Lower Chester, Charleston, West Virginia
- Coordinates: 38°22′3″N 81°38′42″W
- Architect: Multiple
- Architectural style: Colonial Revival, Bungalow/Craftsman, Late Victorian
- NRHP reference No.: 89001800
- Added to NRHP: November 09, 1989

Edgewood Historic District is a national historic district located at Charleston, West Virginia. The district is set on the West Side of the city and was the first planned suburb in Charleston. The area developed in the early 20th century. The architectural styles of Edgewood are eclectic, ranging from Neo-Classicism to Neo-Colonial, from Craftsman to Bungaloid.

It was listed on the National Register of Historic Places in 1989.

== Fire ==
The house listed as Nichols House, located at 856 Chester Road, was destroyed in May, 2023, when a small fire broke out and three fire hydrants near the residence could not supply firefighters with enough water to contain the blaze.
