= WKWS =

- Charleston, West Virginia; United States
- Broadcast area: Charleston, West Virginia
- Frequency: 96.1 MHz
- Branding: 96.1 KWS

Programming
- Format: Classic country

Ownership
- Owner: WVRC Media; (West Virginia Radio Corporation of Charleston)
- Sister stations: WCHS, WCST-FM, WKAZ, WRVZ, WSWW, WVAF

History
- First air date: 1969

Technical information
- Licensing authority: FCC
- Facility ID: 71661
- Class: B
- ERP: 45,000 watts
- HAAT: 157 meters (515 ft)
- Transmitter coordinates: 38°21′54.3″N 81°46′5.5″W

Links
- Public license information: Public file; LMS
- Webcast: Listen Live
- Website: 961kws.com

WKWS (96.1 FM) is a broadcast radio station licensed to Charleston, West Virginia, and owned and operated by WVRC Media

== History ==
=== Origination ===
In 1969, WBES-FM 96.1 was launched by Rollins Telecasting (later acquired by Heritage Media) as an FM sister station of WCHS (AM) and WCHS-TV with a beautiful music format. It would stick with this format for nearly 20 years.

In 1988, shortly after the Heritage acquisition, they would change both their format and callsign. They took the letters WVNS, which stood for “West Virginia’s 96“, and originally tagged themselves as “Warm 96“, playing a mix of oldies and light rock and pop.

Shortly thereafter, they changed the tag to their eponymous “West Virginia’s 96 FM“, and adjusted the format to encompass a wide variety of oldies from the 50s, 60s, 70s, and some light favorites from the 80s. Lady Virginia West (afternoons) and Garrett Majors (mornings) were the main personalities on air.

in 1990, they re-tagged themselves as “Oldies 96“, and scrapped the late 70s and 80s music from their format to be strictly an oldies station. In the fall of that same year, they completely changed their format to soft pop with music furnished from a feed by the Unistar Satellite Network and their tag became "Lite Mix 96". They would have one live section of programming during this time with longtime Charleston radio personality Al Sahley as the morning man.

=== WKWS and the country era ===
in mid 1992, following the purchase of the station by West Virginia Radio Corporation, the format was subsequently changed to country music and was originally tagged "Kicks 96". The skew of WKWS was to target younger country music fans, going after a seemingly untapped audience not reached by Charleston country music mainstay, WQBE-FM. The WVNS callsign went dormant and was picked up in 2003 by WVNS-TV in Lewisburg (not owned by Heritage or WVRC).
