= WKAZ (AM) =

Charleston, West Virginia; United States
- Broadcast area: Charleston, West Virginia; Kanawha County, West Virginia
- Frequency: 680 kHz
- Branding: 95.3 KAZ

Programming
- Format: Country

Ownership
- Owner: WVRC Media; (West Virginia Radio Corporation of Charleston)
- Sister stations: WCHS, WCST-FM, WKWS, WRVZ, WSWW, WVAF

History
- First air date: September 12, 1947 (as WCAW)
- Former call signs: WCAW (1947–2006)

Technical information
- Licensing authority: FCC
- Facility ID: 71662
- Class: B
- Power: 10,000 watts day 221 watts night
- Transmitter coordinates: 38°19′7.0″N 81°32′28.0″W
- Translator: 95.3 W237AZ (Charleston)

Links
- Public license information: Public file; LMS
- Webcast: Listen Live
- Website: Official website

WKAZ (680 kHz) is a country music formatted broadcast radio station licensed to Charleston, West Virginia, serving Charleston and Kanawha County, West Virginia. WKAZ is owned and operated by WVRC Media.

== History ==
WKAZ first aired on September 12, 1947, as WCAW. Its original frequency was 1400 kilohertz with an operating power of 250 watts. It moved to its current frequency (680 kilohertz) on June 5, 1960, and on October 31, 1962, its daytime power was increased to 10,000 watts.

Due to FCC regulations concerning "clear channel" radio stations, it has long been required to turn its power down at night, so as not to interfere with WPTF out of Raleigh, North Carolina, which is designated as a "clear channel" and also broadcasts at 680 kilohertz.

Originally WCAW was the top-rated "Top 40" station in the market during most of the early 1960s. Its main competition within the format at that time was WGKV and WKAZ. The primary ratings battle was between WCAW and WCHS.

WCAW dropped Top 40 later that decade and flipped to a country format shortly after that and stayed with it from the 60s thru the 90s. Over its tenure as a country station, some of its DJ personalities included Randy Damron, Rick Johnson (later worked for WVAF), and "Smilin'" Dewey Calwell.

WCAW was bought by The West Virginia Radio Corporation in 1993, along with WVAF. At various times broadcasting country and American standards formats, the station was formerly a gospel station until sister station WKAZ-FM became Jack FM in 2006, at which point the oldies format was moved to WKAZ AM, and the station tag became "68-KAZ" to differentiate it from its 107.3 FM sister.

As an oldies station, they concentrated on 50s, 60s, 70s, and limited 80's music. They would also broadcast Arkansas Governor Mike Huckabee's syndicated podcast The Huckabee Report three times each weekday.

In addition to its primary AM frequency, WKAZ simulcasts on 95.3 FM (not to be confused with its aforementioned sister station WKAZ-FM, which broadcast on 107.3 FM and did not simulcast with the AM station). Even though the AM station is required by the FCC to turn its power down so as not to interfere with WPTF, the FM repeater is under no such requirement, meaning that the station can still be received via FM day and night.

The format of WKAZ changed from oldies to business news in March 2017, with programming from the Bloomberg Radio network.

On June 16, 2023, WVRC announced that on June 26, the country music format of WKAZ-FM would move to 680 AM and 95.3 FM. The change was in conjunction with sister station WRVZ moving its rhythmic contemporary format from 98.7 to 107.3 on July 10, with 98.7 becoming WCST-FM.
