= WRVZ (FM) =

- Miami, West Virginia; United States
- Broadcast area: Metro Charleston, West Virginia
- Frequency: 107.3 MHz
- Branding: 107.3 The Beat

Programming
- Format: Rhythmic contemporary
- Affiliations: Compass Media Networks

Ownership
- Owner: WVRC Media; (West Virginia Radio Corporation of Charleston)
- Sister stations: WCHS, WCST-FM, WKAZ, WKWS, WSWW, WVAF

History
- First air date: June 6, 1983 (as WVCM)
- Former call signs: WVCM (1983–1988); WLZT (1988–1992); WKAZ (1992–2006); WKAZ-FM (2006–2023)

Technical information
- Licensing authority: FCC
- Facility ID: 19535
- Class: B
- ERP: 23,500 watts
- HAAT: 206 meters (676 feet)
- Transmitter coordinates: 38°16′25.4″N 81°31′26.4″W

Links
- Public license information: Public file; LMS
- Webcast: Listen Live
- Website: 1073thebeatwv.com

WRVZ (107.3 MHz, "107.3 The Beat") is an FM radio station licensed to Miami, West Virginia. Owned by WVRC Media, it broadcasts a rhythmic contemporary format serving the Charleston area.

== History ==
When the station was initially launched, it was known as "Country Heaven 107", broadcasting from Miami (Cabin Creek) West Virginia. Its call sign was WVCM, which stood for “West Virginia’s Country Music“.

In 1987, after it and WXIT were acquired by Empire Broadcasting, the format was changed to a soft rock format, and the station was known as “Lite 107“. The call sign was subsequently changed to WLZT to signify the “lite“ element of the station.

In early 1989, the station would switch to an oldies format, keeping the WLZT call sign, and the tag became "Z–107". Despite the format change, WLZT continued to air the current hit countdown show Casey's Top 40 with Casey Kasem every Sunday morning due to contractual obligations.

Bristol Broadcasting Company acquired the station circa 1992, and briefly changed the format to the CD Country satellite feed format. They retagged the station as “QBE2“, designating it as a high sound quality, continuous music companion to Bristol’s main country station in the market, WQBE.

After approximately a year, the station reverted to oldies and adopted the dormant WKAZ call sign. Original WKAZ (950 AM) personality Frank George hosted an all request hour at noon on weekdays (but did not have a regular length shift beyond that).

The West Virginia Radio Corporation purchased WKAZ-FM and WSWW in 1995. It initially had a 1970s music format until spring 1997.

Around that time, sister station 580 WCHS would move its oldies format to WKAZ-FM in favor of a news and talk radio format. In fall 2001, in the wake of the September 11 terrorist attacks, WKAZ committed to broadcast ABC News Radio updates at the top of every hour, 24/7.

In 2006, WKAZ flipped from oldies to adult hits under the "Jack FM" branding, using the ABC Radio satellite feed.

In March 2007, after the Jack FM format was not well received by listeners in the area, WKAZ-FM restored the previous oldies format using Tom Kent's "Classic Top 40" branding. It positioned itself as "107.3 WKAZ-FM, Classic Top 40".

On April 25, 2012, WKAZ-FM changed its format to classic rock, branded as "107.3 K-Rock".

On August 8, 2014, after stunting for a day with patriotic-themed songs, WKAZ-FM flipped to a broad adult hits format as Tailgate 107.3: positioned as "Party Songs for Party People", the station played a broad mix of current pop and country music, as well as classic hits spanning as far back as the 1970s.

Previous logo

On April 1, 2020, the station flipped to country music as 107.3 KAZ, flanking sister station classic country WKWS.

On June 26, 2023, the country format moved to WKAZ (680 AM), while 107.3 picked up the rhythmic contemporary format, "The Beat" branding, and WRVZ call sign from 98.7 FM on July 10.
