= WCST-FM =

Pocatalico, West Virginia; United States
- Broadcast area: Charleston, West Virginia
- Frequency: 98.7 MHz
- Branding: 98.7 The Mountain

Programming
- Format: Classic rock

Ownership
- Owner: WVRC Media; (West Virginia Radio Corporation of Charleston)
- Sister stations: WCHS, WKAZ, WKWS, WRVZ, WSWW, WVAF

History
- First air date: 1989 (as WTUN)
- Former call signs: WTUN (1989–1994); WWZZ (1994); WRVZ (1994–2023)
- Call sign meaning: Charleston

Technical information
- Facility ID: 71433
- Class: A
- ERP: 630 watts
- HAAT: 188 meters (617 feet)
- Transmitter coordinates: 38°23′53.3″N 81°41′5.5″W

Links
- Webcast: Listen Live
- Website: 987themountain.com

WCST-FM (98.7 MHz) is a classic rock formatted broadcast radio station licensed to Pocatalico, West Virginia, and serving the Charleston area.

== History ==
WCST-FM originated in 1989, using the call sign WTUN. However, details are sketchy about the format used at the time.

=== WRVC repeater ===
On November 21, 1994, WTUN changed its call sign to WRVZ, and it was used by WRVC in Huntington as a broadcast relay station to expand their signal into the Charleston area when WRVC had an oldies format. WRVC was most likely motivated for doing so because the usual oldies mainstay of Charleston, WKAZ-FM (107.3), was notorious for changing formats and they saw opportunity to expand their reach even further. (They had already increased their power to 100,000 watts from Ashland at the time.)

=== Acquired by WVRC ===
In 1997, after being acquired by West Virginia Radio Corporation, the station assumed a modern AC outlet called "Planet 98.7" prior to its flip to rhythmic top 40 in 1998. This was the only rhythmic top 40 formatted radio station in West Virginia.

In July 2023, the rhythmic top 40 format moved to WKAZ-FM; 98.7 then changed its call sign from WRVZ to WCST-FM (to differentiate itself from WCST in Berkeley Springs), adopted the branding "98.7 The Mountain," and adopted a classic rock format.
