= Tom Kent =

American radio personality (1954/1955–2024)

- Born: August 6, 1954; Winston-Salem, North Carolina, U.S.
- Died: June 24, 2024 (aged 69); Brecksville, Ohio, U.S.
- Occupations: Radio personality, record executive, CEO-President TKRN
- Years active: 1973-late 1980s, 2002–2024 (radio)
- Spouse: Karen Marie
- Children: 3
- Website: https://www.tomkentradio.com/

Thomas Kent Newton (August 6, 1954 – June 24, 2024) was an American radio personality and label executive. As the head of the Tom Kent Radio Network, Kent hosted and produced syndicated daily, weekend and, 24/7 programming each week on approximately 600 stations. The majority of Kent's programming was centered on classic hits and adult contemporary music formats, with selected programming made available to stations of any music format.

== Biography ==
Prior to becoming syndicated, Kent worked on the air and in programming at the top 40 radio station WLS in Chicago. Kent also worked on the air at KFJZ Ft. Worth, KLIF in Dallas, WIBG Philadelphia, WGCL and WIXY in Cleveland, WMXJ in Miami, WAVA-FM in Washington, D.C., where he was also the Program Director, and WBZZ (B-94) in Pittsburgh.

In addition, Kent worked in the music industry as a promotion executive for Elektra Entertainment, which was a division of Time-Warner's Warner Music Group. While an executive at Elektra, Kent received many awards including "Promotion Rookie of the Year" and "Promotion Executive of the Year" both separate and individual awards in different years. He helped break and bring to the national music spotlight national music recording artists Tracy Chapman, Third Eye Blind, Keith Sweat, Moby, Natalie Merchant, Simply Red, Missy Elliott, Gerald Levert, Metallica, Yolanda Adams, and En Vogue.

On August 6, 2015, The National Radio Hall of Fame in Chicago nominated Tom Kent in the category of syndicated music personality.

=== Syndication ===
On June 29, 2002, Kent launched the Tom Kent Organization and its radio network, the TKO Radio Network. It was here that Kent launched what was then oldies programming, centered around the decades of 1964 to 1973. Drawing on inspiration from classic Top 40 disc jockeys, Kent's goal was to create a broad-based persona that, while still appealing to the "adult power demo" (persons 25 to 54, many of whom listened to Top 40 radio at a young age), would be enjoyed by all ages. During this time, Kent created and hosted the programs "Into the Seventies," a five-hour weekly program devoted to 1970s music, and "Hall of Fame Coast to Coast", a general six-day-a-week oldies program. The programming was immensely successful and significantly boosted ratings on the stations it aired. In 2006, Kent turned the network into the "Classic Top 40" network, renaming the weeknight show from "Hall of Fame Coast to Coast" to "Classic Top 40 Weeknights." The long-term goal was to create a 24-hour network out of this with similar programming.

Exactly five years after Kent launched the network, on June 29, 2007, he resigned as host and sold the company.

=== Tom Kent Radio Network ===
Kent then launched a new network, the Tom Kent Radio Network. The network ran on a small number of personnel, with Kent's family members providing a large proportion of the network's staff. Programs included a live five-hour show called The Music Magazine as well as weekend shows The Ultimate Party, a live five-hour Saturday evening party show, and My 70s Show, a five-hour show that plays music from the 1970s. Other offerings included Powerline hosted by Brother Jon Rivers (based on the original Powerline radio program that was produced by the Southern Baptist Convention from 1969 until 2003 and was also hosted by Rivers), Totally 90s Now, Lovin' Life, Livin' the 80s, Sweet Soul Weekend with Jeff Foxx, TK 2K, The Classic Hits Countdown, and The Diva Diner hosted by Kent's daughter Jackie Newton. The Tom Kent Radio Network had more than 600 affiliates since its launch in March 2008, reaching nearly 100 million listeners.

On April 18, 2011, TKRN launched a 24-hour Classic Hits network called 24/7 Fun. The network featured Steve Kent on weekdays from 3:00-6:00 AM and from 1:00-4:00 PM, Jackie Newton also on weekdays from 11:00 PM-3:00 AM and from 9:00 AM-1:00 PM, and Tom Kent from 4:00-11:00 PM on weekdays and all Saturday. Brother Jon Rivers (5:00-10:00 AM) and Jeff Foxx (7:00 PM-12:00 AM) presented on Sunday.

Upon launching TKRN, Kent entered into a distribution and sales agreement with Jones Radio Network in March 2008 and then in February 2009, with ABC Radio Network. Starting in February 2012, Kent employed sales and distribution services through United Stations Radio Networks.

Following Kent's death, retired executive Ed Douglas returned to the company, where he and Kent's next of kin devised a plan to wind down the network's operations; advertising sales and affiliations (300 at the time of Kent's death) had already been declining before Kent died, and the loss of the network's namesake and flagship star made continuing the show unfeasible, since they did not believe rerunning his existing archives would be as effective. The last programming on the network ended near the end of 2024.

== Personal life ==
Kent lived in suburban Cleveland, Ohio, with his wife Karen Marie. Kent and his family moved back to Cleveland in 1988 and had lived there since. Two of Kent's three children, Jackie Newton and Steve Kent, host radio shows on the network. Karen Marie works behind the scenes at the network. Kent died from cancer at home on June 24, 2024, at the age of 69.
