= Miami, West Virginia =

- Unincorporated community
- Location within West Virginia Location within the United States
- Coordinates: 38°09′08″N 81°26′52″W
- Country: United States
- State: West Virginia
- County: Kanawha
- Elevation: 676 ft (206 m)
- Time zone: UTC-5 (Eastern (EST))
  - Summer (DST): UTC-4 (EDT)
- ZIP code: 25134
- Area codes: 304 & 681
- GNIS feature ID: 1555109

Miami is an unincorporated community in Kanawha County, West Virginia, United States. Miami is 4.5 miles (7.2 km) south of East Bank along Cabin Creek. Miami has a post office with ZIP code 25134.

The community was named after the Miami Indians.
