= Baltimore Orioles Radio Network =

Official radio network of MLB's Baltimore Orioles

The Baltimore Orioles Radio Network is a radio network comprising 39 stations that carry coverage of the Baltimore Orioles, a professional baseball team in Major League Baseball. The network spans five states and the District of Columbia.

Beginning in 2022, the Orioles' flagship station was once again WBAL/1090 AM and was joined by sister station WIYY/97.9 FM; a game conflict with the Baltimore Ravens sees one station carrying the Orioles, and the other the Ravens. The contract is for six years. Geoff Arnold, Brett Hollander, Melanie Newman and Scott Garceau are the Orioles' radio voices who are part of a rotation in which two broadcasters work each game. All 162 regular-season baseball games are currently broadcast throughout the network.

== Affiliates ==
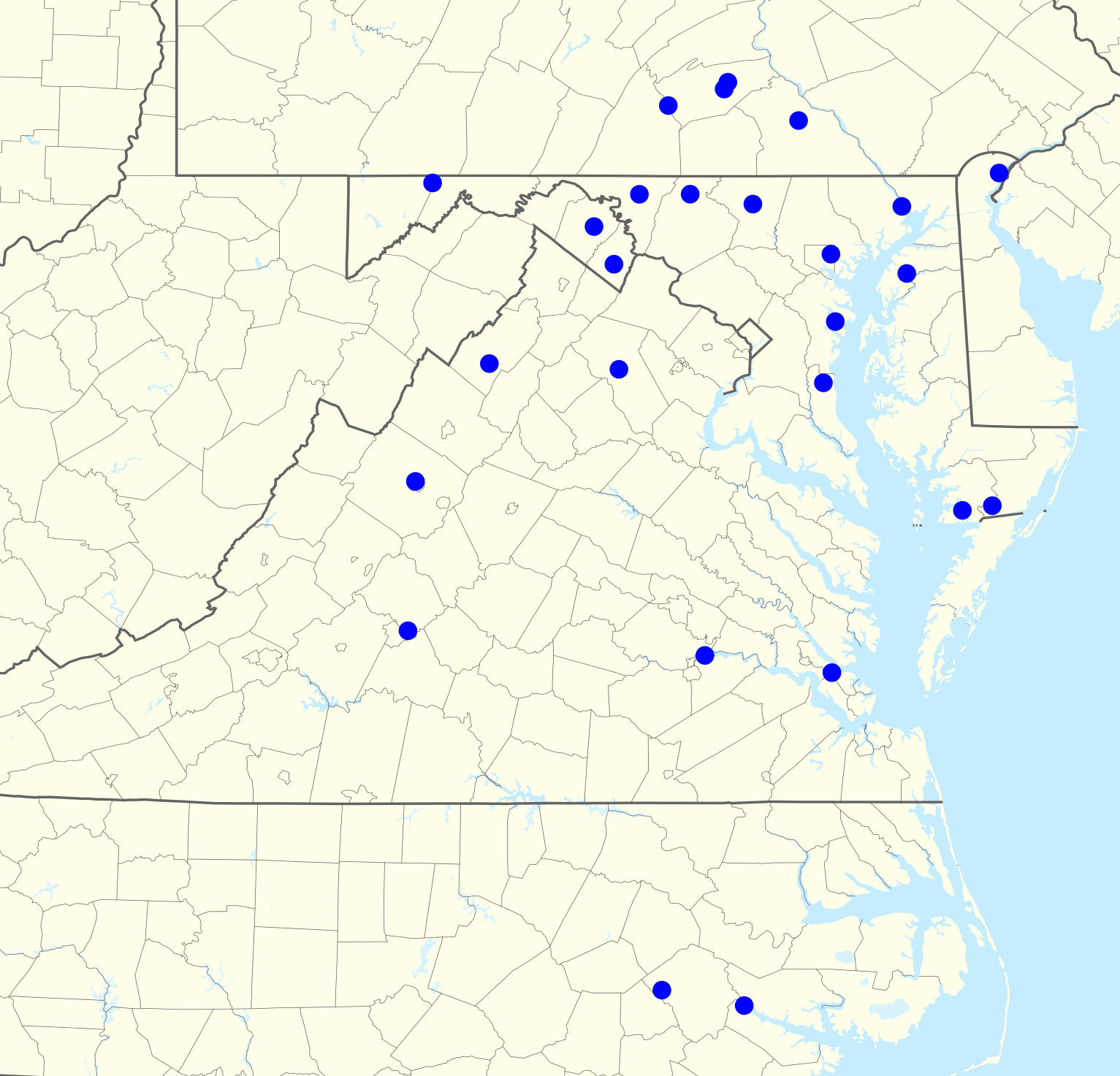
Map of radio affiliates in 2015

City/market	State/Dist.	Station	Frequency	Network status
Salisbury–Ocean City	Delaware	WZBH	93.5 FM	Affiliate
Washington, D.C.	District of Columbia	WSBN	630 AM	Affiliate
Annapolis	Maryland	WNAV	1430 AM	Affiliate (Note: Only games that do not conflict with the Chesapeake Baysox.)
Annapolis	Maryland	W224EM	92.7 FM	WNAV relay
Baltimore	Maryland	WBAL	1090 AM	Flagship
Baltimore	Maryland	WIYY	97.9 FM	Flagship
Baltimore	Maryland	W268BA	101.5 FM	WBAL relay
Cambridge	Maryland	WAAI	100.9 FM	Affiliate
Cumberland–Frostburg	Maryland	WTBO	1450 AM	Affiliate
Cumberland–Frostburg	Maryland	W250CM	97.9 FM	WTBO relay
Hagerstown	Maryland	WARK	1490 AM	Affiliate
Hagerstown	Maryland	W255CP	98.9 FM	WARK relay
Hagerstown	Maryland	WWEG	106.9 FM	Affiliate
Westminster	Maryland	WTTR	1470 AM	Affiliate
Westminster	Maryland	W272CX	102.3 FM	WTTR relay
Greenville	North Carolina	WGHB	1250 AM	Affiliate
Washington	North Carolina	WDLX	930 AM	Affiliate
Carlisle	Pennsylvania	WIOO	1000 AM	Affiliate
Carlisle	Pennsylvania	W250AP	97.9 FM	WIOO relay
Hanover	Pennsylvania	WHVR	1280 AM	Affiliate
Hanover	Pennsylvania	W237EN	95.3 FM	WHVR relay
York	Pennsylvania	WSBA	910 AM	Affiliate
York	Pennsylvania	W230CQ	93.9 FM	WSBA relay
Hopewell	Virginia	WHAP	1340 AM	Affiliate
Hopewell	Virginia	W245CU	96.9 FM	WHAP relay
Lynchburg	Virginia	WLVA	580 AM	Affiliate
Lynchburg	Virginia	W231CE	94.1 FM	WLVA relay
Winchester	Virginia	WINC	1400 AM	Affiliate
Winchester	Virginia	WINC-FM	105.5 FM	Affiliate
Yorktown	Virginia	WVSP-FM	94.1 FM	Affiliate
Berkeley Springs	West Virginia	WCST	1010 AM	Affiliate
Berkeley Springs	West Virginia	W228DU	93.5 FM	WCST relay
Martinsburg	West Virginia	WEPM	1340 AM	Affiliate
Martinsburg	West Virginia	W229CM	93.7 FM	WEPM relay

== See also ==
- List of XM Satellite Radio channels
- List of Sirius Satellite Radio stations
