= WCST =

WCST can refer to:

- WCST (AM), a radio station (1010 AM) located in Berkeley Springs, West Virginia, United States
- WCST-FM, a radio station (98.7 FM) located in Pocatalico, West Virginia, United States
- Wisconsin Card Sorting Test, a neuropsychological test
- WXDC, a radio station (92.9 FM) in Berkeley Springs, West Virginia, United States, which held the call sign WCST-FM from 1965 to 1996
