= Whap =

Whap or WHAP may refer to:

- "Whap", an episode of Harper's Island
- AP World History, a high school college credit course offered by the Advanced Placement Program
- WHAP, a sports radio station in Hopewell, Virginia
- WhAP, a Wheeled Armoured Platform manufactured by Tata Advanced Systems in India.
