= Abell-Kilbourn House =

Historic house in West Virginia, United States

- U.S. National Register of Historic Places
- U.S. Historic district – Contributing property
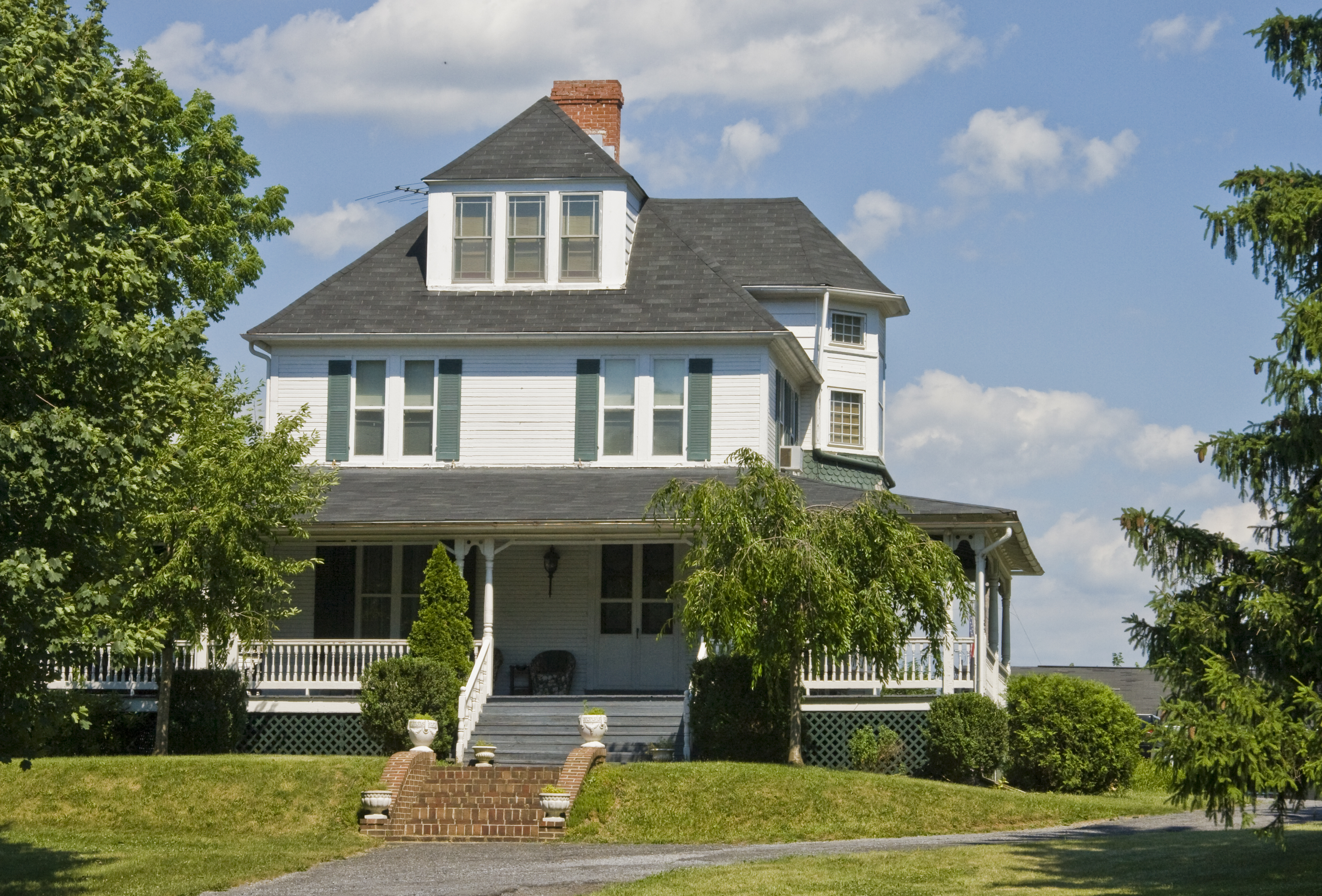

- Location within West Virginia Location within the United States
- Location: 1018 Winchester Ave., Martinsburg, West Virginia
- Coordinates: 39°26′43.5″N 77°58′47.3″W
- Built: 1895
- Architectural style: Colonial Revival
- NRHP reference No.: 94001290
- Added to NRHP: November 21, 1994

The Abell-Kilbourne House in Martinsburg, West Virginia is associated with John N. Abell, a prominent Martinsburg businessman and Charles W. Kilbourn, a Martinsburg mill owner. The former president of the Old National Bank, Abell developed the area known as "Abell's Addition" after his retirement in 1886. At that time Abell lived at 506 West Burke Street.

== Description ==
The house is a frame 2½ story Colonial Revival structure. The house's long axis is arranged perpendicular to the street, from which it is well set back at the top of a rise. The house has a hip roof, with a three-story tower on the right side, and is fronted by a broad porch that wraps around to either side. The tower houses the main stairs. The porch features low-key Eastlake detailing. Windows in the attic contain colored novelty glass. A unique feature in the pantry is a built-in refrigerator in the pantry. Other unusual features are the windows set in the floor of the second floor storage room, which allow light into the room from the porch ceiling below. The basement contains a cistern.

A garage and barn, garage and office, and servants' residence are associated with the house.

== History ==
Abell bought the Winchester Street site in 1895 from D.W. Shaffer for $1,075 and completed the house the same year. The surrounding development was associated with the Martinsburg Mining, Manufacturing, and Improvement Company. Abell lived in the house until his death in 1905. His wife Nora lived there until 1910 when she sold the house to Thomas B. Underhill, who immediately sold it to E.F. Millard. Millard sold the house a year later to John W. Wilen. Wilen sold the house and adjoining lots on July 24, 1912, for $3,780 to J. M. Rothwell, who then sold the house and lots to Charles W. Kilbourn on May 23, 1918, for $8,500. Kilbourn died on November 28, 1937. In 1938, the house was sold to George Martin, who retained the house until 1987.

Charles Kilbourn owned the Interwoven Mill in Martinsburg. His father invented a knitting machine and started the Kilbourne Knitting Machine Company in 1899 at the Middlesex Mill in New Jersey. After a fire, Charles Kilbourn, who by then had inherited the operation of the company, relocated to Martinsburg. The Interwoven Mill was the largest manufacturing operation in the Eastern Panhandle of West Virginia.

The Abell-Kilbourn House was listed on the National Register of Historic Places in 1994, and is included in the Boomtown Historic District.
