= WDHC =

WDHC may refer to:

- WDHC-LD, a low-power television station (channel 6, virtual 11) licensed to serve Dickson–Nashville, Tennessee, United States
- WXDC, a radio station (92.9 FM) licensed to serve Berkeley Springs, West Virginia, United States, which held the call sign WDHC from 1996 to 2017
