= Shannondale Springs =

Coordinates: 39.23053°N 77.83787°W

- U.S. National Register of Historic Places
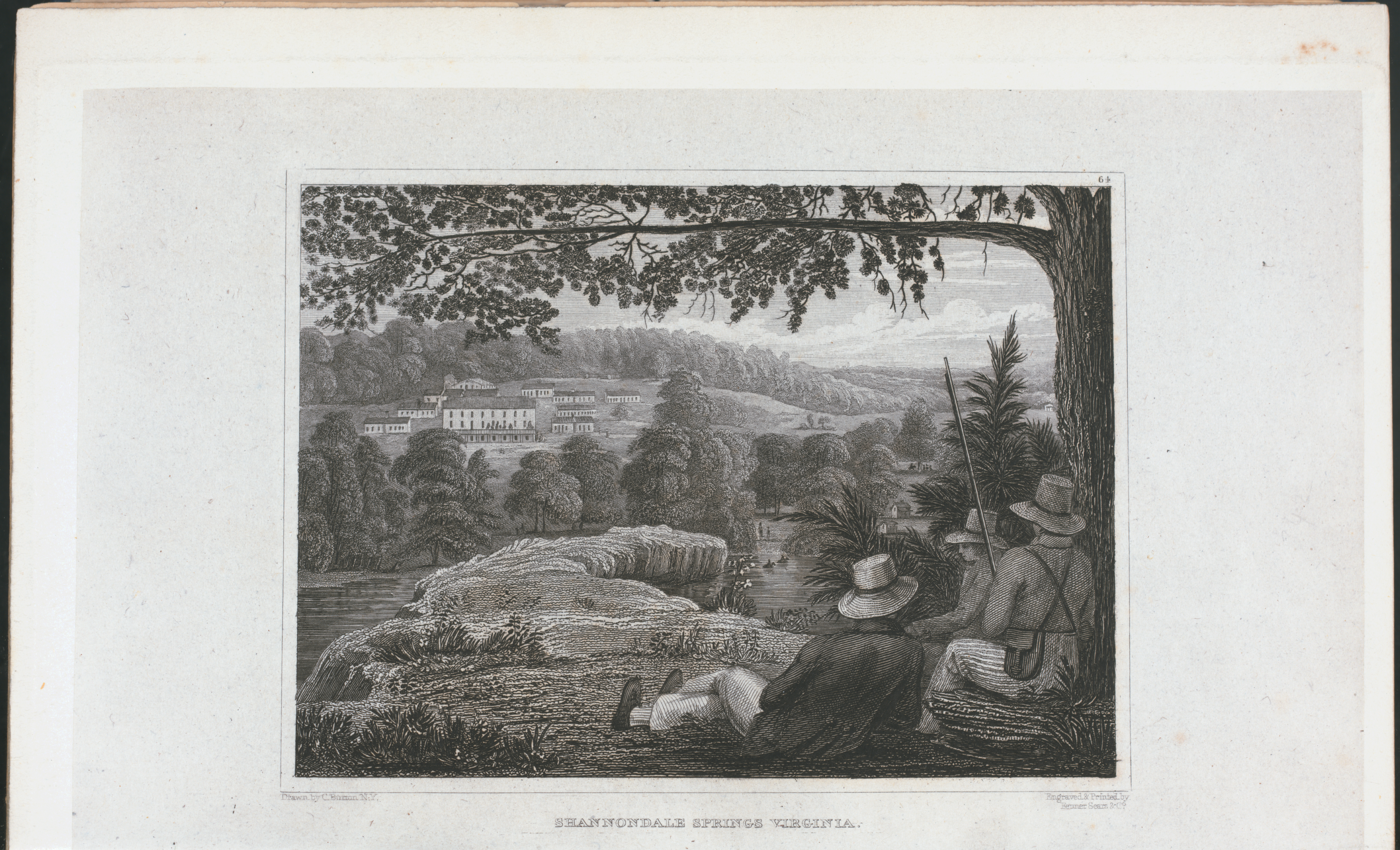
- Shannondale Springs, Virginia.

- Location within West Virginia
- Nearest city: Shannondale, West Virginia
- Built: 1820
- NRHP reference No.: 98000289
- Added to NRHP: March 31, 1998

Shannondale Springs is a former American resort associated with mineral springs on the bank of the Shenandoah River upstream from Harpers Ferry, West Virginia. The water from the main spring was reputed to have mild laxative qualities, while other springs had a sulfurous odor. The resort began in 1820 with the construction of 10 to 12 wood cottages, and a two-story hotel was added the next year. The hotel and some of the cottages burned in 1858. After the Civil War several new brick cottages were built and a new hotel was built on the site of the old in 1890. This hotel burned in 1909 and was never rebuilt. The cottages and accessory structures lasted another thirty years before becoming uninhabitable.

In the late 18th century the 29,000-acre (120 km^{2}) Shannondale tract was owned by Fernandino Fairfax (1769-1820), who sold several parcels between 1811 and 1819 to settle debts. A ferry was established around 1819. Fairfax's residence, Shannon Hill, was across the Shenandoah from the Shannondale site. After a good start, the resort struggled until the Baltimore and Ohio Railroad and the Winchester and Potomac Railroad reached Harpers Ferry in 1834 and 1835, respectively. This permitted easy access from Baltimore and Washington, D.C. The loss of the hotel to fire and the coming of the Civil War closed the resort until 1867, when the resort resumed operations on a much-diminished scale. A flood in 1870 caused considerable damage, and in 1890 a new hotel was constructed with 25 guest rooms, a ballroom and several bath houses. Investors in the new hotel had ties to the Charles Town Mining, Manufacturing and Improvement Company, and proposed to mine iron deposits near the springs. In 1902 the property was purchased at public sale by H.C. Getzendanner, who reopened the hotel in 1903. By 1919 Getzendanner had sold the resort to E.B. Frye for $500. In 1931 a lessor sold the waters for $1 per five-gallon bottle. The property was sold again in 1937 to Thornton T. Perry, Sr.. Much of the property was later donated to The Nature Conservancy, and in 1986 it was transferred to the West Virginia Division of Natural Resources.

From 1996 the Jefferson County Historic Landmarks Commission has leased the last two remaining structures, a bathhouse and a fountain, and has undertaken stabilization work.
