= Shenandoah Valley Railroad =

Shenandoah Valley Railroad refers to one of several railroads in the U.S. states of Virginia and West Virginia:

- Shenandoah Valley Railroad (short-line), a current short line
- Shenandoah Valley (Electric) Railroad, a proposed trolley system in Martinsburg, West Virginia
- Shenandoah Valley Railroad (1867–1890), predecessor of the Norfolk and Western Railway
  - Shenandoah Valley Railway (1890), short-lived successor to the above
