= Martinsburg Street Railway =

Former electric streetcar system in Martinsburg, WV.

- Martinsburg Street Railway Company car #1

Overview
- Franchise: March 1891
- Key people: J.R. Wilson, owner; John B. Wilson, president & treasurer; J.W. Walker, secretary
- Reporting mark: MSRY
- Locale: Martinsburg, West Virginia
- Dates of operation: 1891–1893

Technical
- Track gauge: (?)
- Electrification: Overhead wires, General Electric, McIntosh & Seymour engines
- Track length: 3.5 miles (5.6 km)

The Martinsburg Street Railway was an electric street railway system and company in Martinsburg, West Virginia. It was built in 1891 during a period where the electric streetcar was prominent. The railway thrived starting off, however, the company collapsed after business dropped off.

The street railway never made a profit during its operation and it closed in 1893 after its franchise was revoked, attributed to worn macadam. It was also said that the railway closed due to the small size of Martinsburg. The network liquidated in 1896, shipping its trolley cars to the Hagerstown Railway. It was said that service would had continue if the street railway's owner, J.R. Wilson, took on a business partner.

== History ==
=== Planning and construction ===
Construction of the line along Queen Street. To the left is The Peoples National Bank

On March 20, 1891, the Martinsburg Street Railway company got a twenty-year charter to own, operate, and construct electric streetcars, cable cars and horse-drawn streetcars. In April, the company elected its officials and plans were made to construct and run electric streetcars. On April 30, streets were measured for the street railway.

By July 1891, the railway was under construction. On July 11, the first rails were laid in Strinesville near Williamsport Pike. Track started to be laid on August 18. Queen Street was filled with an "army of laborers laying track." A steam roller and stone crusher were needed to level stone. During construction, Martinsburg's street lights needed to run all night to prevent accidents. By September 5, track between the depots was completed. On September 11, Martinsburg's city council ordered the Martinsburg Street Railway to be financially and physically responsible for sewers on King, Martin, Queen, and other streets. The streetcar company was also ordered to remove stone and clear streets as they laid tracks. By September 19, King Street was lined with rails and trolley poles. The Strinesville line was also completed to Queen Street, however further work on the line was halted for line to Boomtown. By October 24, the cars had arrived and the railway was planned to run in a week.

=== Opening and expansion ===
Hand bill for Boomtown's lot sale

The Martinsburg Street Railway opened in 1891, on October 29 (Note: Later accounts state that the railway opened on October 30) just before 10 p.m. EDT. The street railway saw more than 3,000 paid fares the first day. The streetcar's opening was coordinated alongside the Martinsburg Mining, Manufacturing, and Improvement Company two day sale of lots in Boomtown, located on the south side of town. The street railway's business was "booming" in October and was deemed "promising" by the Virginia Free Press in November. By December, the street railway was extended on Queen Street to near Baltimore and Ohio Railroad's crossing.

The Martinsburg Street Railway implemented Baltimore and Ohio Railroad's block system in February 1892. In May, major work was done on an streetcar extension to Elkins Park, (Note: However, a newspaper from The World in December 1891, stated that the Martinsburg Street Railway already ran to Elkins Park) the line planned to operate to the B&O Railroad crossing on Queen Street. It was completed by June 11. On August 11, John B. Wilson, president of the Martinsburg Street Railway, sent a petition to Martinsburg's council to extend the railway along North Queen Street to Martinsburg's city limits, however, it was adjourned. This extension would require a grade crossing on Queen Street with the B&O. In September, Wilson sent a testimonial to the R. D. Nuttall Company stating that he was pleased with the company's "trolley" and that he wanted to trade for "several more" of them if he could get rid of the street railway's current fleet. On September 3, the street railway was announced to temporarily close until the railway had built a plant, which went into effect by September 6. In December, it was argued that the railway was burdened over strict legal demands and competing interests.

=== Elkins Park ===
Elkins Park was a 24-acre (1,000,000 sq ft) trolley park at the terminus of the Martinsburg Street Railway. The park was located just south of Route 45 and Route 9, near the Hott Benner Farm, on land owned by the Martinsburg Mining, Manufacturing, and Improvement Company. The park was approximately 1.5 miles (2.4 km) away from Martinsburg city limits. People wanted to visit the park to escape hot evenings in the shade. The park held picnics and recreational activities, which included dancing and evening excursions.

The improvement company's property around Martinsburg was named "Elkins Park" by August 15, 1891. On June 21, 1892, Elkins Park opened with an estimated 2,500 attendees. It was proposed to establish an agricultural fair at the park after its opening, by July 2, 1892. In June 1893, work was being done to erect a dancing pavilion at the park. That month, it was also planned to install baseball fields at Elkins Park with a stand and fence, in coordination with a local team. On April 13, 1896, a sale was planned for Elkins Park's poles and other materials.

=== Decline and closure ===
On March 24, 1893, Judge Jackson of the United States Court granted the B&O Railroad a temporary restraining order from the Martinsburg Street Railway. The B&O requested a injunction to stop the Martinsburg Street Railway from laying tracks on their railroad. The injunction was granted on July 27, 1898, and the street railway was ordered to pay. On April 10, 1893, the Martinsburg Street Railway was ordered to repay $3769.51 of debt to the National Bank of Martinsburg. On the same day, Judge Faulkner also granted John B. Wilson $24,647.07, from the Martinsburg Street Railway over an action in assumpsit. In May, the Swartz Mill was in the process of repairment to be used as a generator room for Edison Illuminating; which would house an engine for the Martinsburg Street Railway. The street railway announced to resume operations on July 6, alongside new dynamo and the reopening of Elkins Park. They were running by July 5. Edison General Electric ordered a court case on the Martinsburg Street Railway over assumpsit, which was thrown out by October 14.

The Martinsburg Street Railway closed in early October as they needed more power and equipment, resulting in the forfeiture of their charter. Their franchise was repealed on October 5 due to the eroded macadamizing (which exposed the rails) and out-of-shape rails. The Martinsburg Herald rebut this claim, stating that macadam was the council's responsibility, that the railway was in working condition, and that the city now had to be responsible for repairs. The railway needed a new franchise to resume service. By October 21, the railway was seen as "all right" and that it would come out of the conflict in working condition. John Wilson stated that he would appeal the revocation during the spring election the next year.

=== Revival attempts ===
In 1894, the Martinsburg Street Railway was used as political tension for John B. Wilson's mayoral campaign. Wilson won the election, which meant the railway wouldn't be dismantled. General Electric issued another court order in April over detinue, which was also thrown out. In September, a court order allowed Edison General Electric to retain property seized from the Martinsburg Street Railway.

By January 12, 1895, it was unlawful to block the streetcar tracks. On March 21, a council meeting took place to renew the Martinsburg Street Railway's franchise, however, the meeting was adjourned. On May 17, Martinsburg Street Railway's charter license was taxed, proving its renewal. The railway was noted to be non-operational in April, July, and September, where it was "wrecked". On September 24, 1895, Judge Faulkner appointed E. P. H. Harrison as receiver of the Martinsburg Street Railway with permission to sell its franchise or to sell the railway's property in multiple parcels. The Martinsburg Herald hoped that the new receiver would restart service on the railway.

=== Disestablishment and liquidation ===
A sale was planned for the Martinsburg Street Railway on December 18, 1895 with an asking price of $12,000 cash. The Hagerstown and Potomac Railway Company offered a deal of $6,000 in cash and $4,000 in bonds, but this was declined by the street railway. One day later, the plant would be sold Harrisburg Construction Company for $10,000, which included the company's rails, trolley cars and other equipment to construct the Funkstown and Leitersburg extension of the Hagerstown Railway in Hagerstown, Maryland. Track, rail, and other property, were in the process of dismantlement (to later be sold) in late January. In March, a sale on the overhead wire was finalized to a supply firm in St. Louis. The cars were sold again on April 2 to the Hagerstown Railway for $900 without dynamo. The cars were delivered on April 4 over the Cumberland Valley Railroad at a top speed of 4.5 miles per hour (7.2 km/h), the trail cars rode on gondolas while the motor cars were dragged. These were the railway's final assets. A sale was planned for John B. Wilson's real estate on April 13. The street railway's charter was repealed the next month. In September, the trolley poles were still extant; creating a hazard. E. P. H. Harrison was not empowered to remove the poles without court orders.

=== Other proposals ===
In April 1902, there were talks to build a street railway in Martinsburg after an increase of population in Boomtown, as many residents now lived between Elkins Park and West Stephen Street who weren't there when former streetcar system was in operation.

In September 1908, the Berkeley Traction Company asked Martinsburg's city council for a street railway franchise. The company planned to construct an urban loop with extending lines to the west, east, and south, with later proposals for trolley lines to Shepherdstown and Winchester, Virginia. The franchise was granted by November. By December, the company proposed an electric railway line between Williamsport, Maryland and Martinsburg. By April 1909, however, the company phased out and the Tuscarora Traction Company applied for a franchise.

On October 13, 1912, Clearance E. Martin, J. Whann McSherry, S. N. Myers, Gray Silver, John Stewart, and F. E. Wilson formed the Shenandoah Valley (Electric) Railroad, which sought out to build an electric trolley line from Martinsburg to Williamsport, Winchester, Hedgesville, Shepherdstown, and Charles Town. On March 27, 1912, Clearance E. Martin was granted a street railway franchise from Martinsburg and on April 12, 1912, Winchester also granted Martin a franchise. On October 31, 1912, a proposed Martinsburg Street Railway was reported to soon undertake survey work. The Shenandoah Valley Railroad project, however, died out after World War I and the rise of the Automobile.

== Description ==
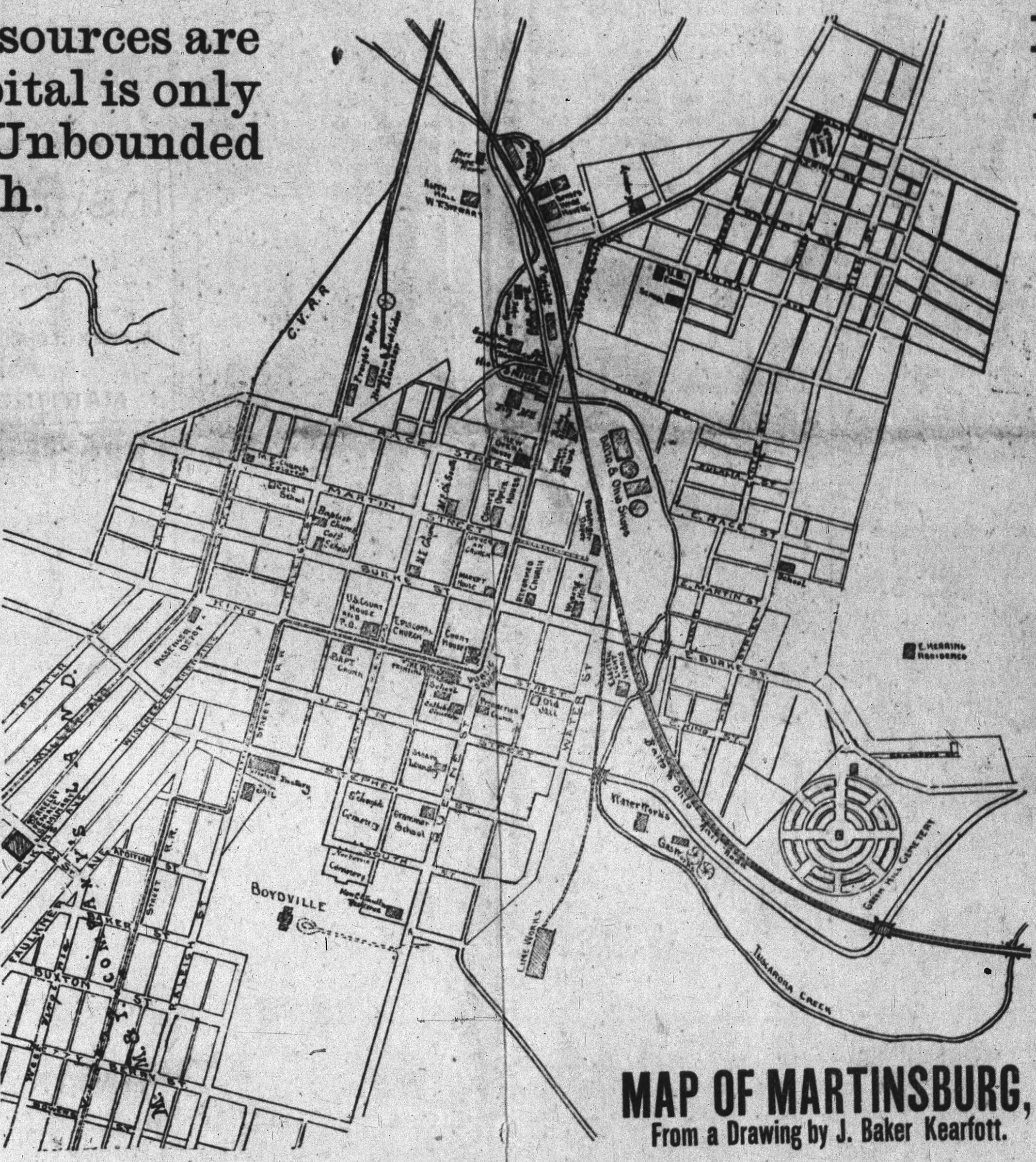
Map of Martinsburg in 1892 with the street railway

The line traveled from the B&O depot along Martin Street, to Queen Street and the public square, where it then traveled on King Street to the Cumberland Valley Railroad depot (located near the Interwoven Mill). From King Street, a branch line traveled on Raleigh Street reaching Boomtown and the jail before following New York Avenue until reaching Elkins Park. Track also extended along Queen Street to the far north. The railway met both the southern and northern city limits, serving the post office, hotels, stores, and Martinsburg Mining, Manufacturing, and Improvement Co. development.

The Martinsburg Street Railway used T-rail, each segment weighed 40 pounds. The Edison Illuminating Company furnished many of the street railway's materials. The trolley cars were painted red with silver boards depicting the trolleys route and the company's logo. Their interior was furnished with electric lights, hardwood floors, brussels carpet, and seats. The fare was five cents (which was ten cents round-trip).

== Remnants ==
In April 1908, wooden railroad tie was found approximately one foot underground on the west side of the public square when water pipes were laid. The ties were covered back up after construction finished.

A set of bridge abutments were located near the intersection of Route 45/Route 9 and New York Avenue before being removed in November 1968, for the highway's bypass. A graded stretch of right of way exists along the east side of New York Avenue between Sheridan Avenue and Route 45. Known items from the system are pictures, a length of rail, and a ticket.

== Financials ==
The Martinsburg Street Railway company started with $50 in capital with a cap of $50,000. Shares started at $10. By May 1891, the company's capital had grown to $5,000. By September 1893, the capital had grown to $50,000 with a cap of $100,000. The capital stagnated at $50,000 throughout 1894 and 1895.

The street railway company had no bonded debt by 1895.

The Martinsburg Street Railway lost $35,000 (as of April 1896) during its operation, a $5,000 increase from earlier that year.

== See also ==
- List of West Virginia railroads
