= Boomtown Historic District =

- U.S. National Register of Historic Places
- U.S. Historic district
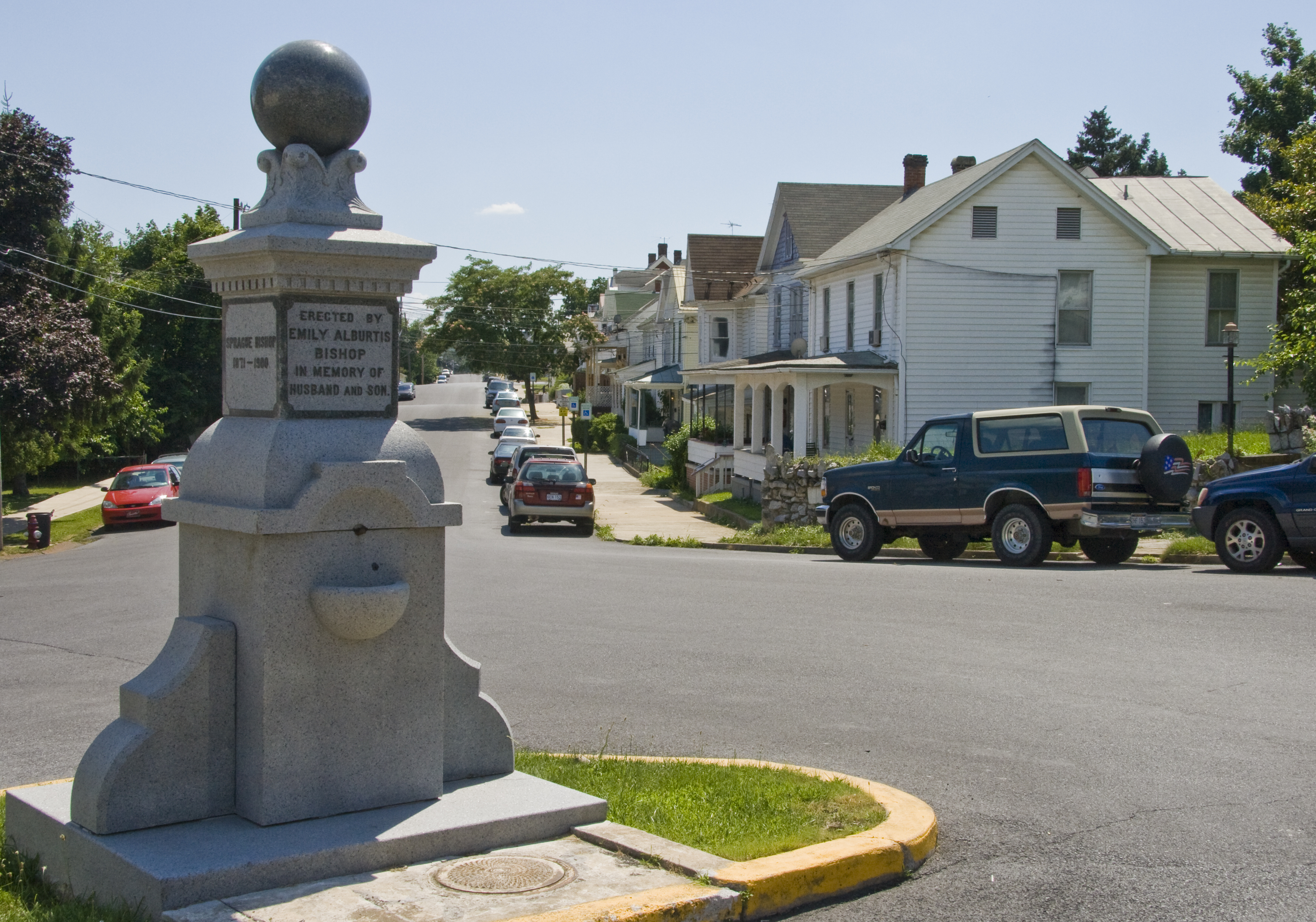
- Fountain on Virginia Ave

- Location within West Virginia Location within the United States
- Location: Roughly along Winchester Ave. to Arden Rd., W. King St. to Red Hill Rd., W. Stephen, W. Addition St, and Raleigh Sts., Martinsburg, West Virginia
- Coordinates: 39°27′6″N 77°58′44″W
- Area: 142 acres (57 ha)
- Built: 1891
- Architect: Multiple
- Architectural style: Greek Revival, Queen Anne, Shingle Style
- MPS: Berkeley County MRA
- NRHP reference No.: 80004414
- Added to NRHP: December 10, 1980

The Boomtown Historic District is a streetcar suburb boomtown consisting of the western and southern portions of Martinsburg, West Virginia, generally along the alignments of West King Street and Winchester Avenue. It includes a former industrial section of the town, home to a number of textile mills, as well as the housing that was built for mill workers.

Boomtown's central core is along Virginia, West Virginia and Faulkner Avenues, centering on the fountain at Virginia and Faulkner. The area consists of primarily middle-class Victorian-style houses, in contrast to the more modest working-class houses on the opposite side of Winchester Avenue.

The area was designated a historic district in 1980. It includes the separately-listed Abell-Kilbourn House.

== Development ==
Advertisement for the 1891 lot sale

Boomtown was laid out by the Martinsburg Mining, Manufacturing, and Improvement Company, with 3,000 lots and 42 streets. A separate area was divided up for manufacturing plants. These were completed on April 12, 1891. Boomtown opened on October 30 and 31, as a two-day sale of lots. The sale was successful with good advertising, as clients from New York, Chicago, and from other areas, bought lots. They made $94,430.

Boomtown opened in conjunction with the Martinsburg Street Railway. The line traveled along the rear and east of the development.

== Textile mills ==
Boomtown's laid out its textile mills near the intersection of King Street and the Winchester Turnpike. These were recruited by the MMM&I. The Chesapeake and Ohio and the Cumberland Valley Railroad started operations to the mills in 1873. The area was established by the Cashmere Mills, Crawford Woolen Company, Interwoven Mills, Shenandoah Pants Company, and the Southern Merchant Tailoring Company in 1891. The Crawford Woolen and Cashmere Mills stood along Stephen Street. These mills made Martinsburg a manufacturing hub.

In the following fifteen years after 1891, the industrial area was populated by the Heiston Construction Company, Purdy Picture Frame Company, H. P. Thorn Lumber Company, and other large stores and corporations. These mills suffered due to the Great Depression and were lost within the next 40 years.

=== Interwoven Mill ===
The Kilbourne Knitting Machine Co. shown on the Sanborn Fire Insurance Map from Martinsburg, March 1897

The Interwoven Mill was the largest manufacturing factory in the Eastern panhandle of West Virginia. It was a "boom" for Martinsburg.

In 1893, Charles Kilbourn took over operations at the Middlesex Mill, which was owned and operated by Colonel R.J. Hickman. Charles implemented the knitting machine, which was invented by his father. In 1899, Charles's father started Kilbourne Knitting Machine Company in New Jersey, Charles acted as vice president. After a fire, the Kilbourne Knitting Machine Company relocated to the Interwoven Mill. Both mills were expanded and renamed the Interwoven Mill after Hickman's death. By 1922, the Interwoven Mill expanded to nearly triple it's 1897 size. During World War II, the mill would manufacture socks for the army and navy. The factory's decline started in the 1950s, ownership subsequently changed hands to Kayser-Roth in 1962. The Interwoven Mill closed in February 1976.

In 2018, the Interwoven Mill was up for sale as adaptive reuse. The Interwoven Mill became the Interwoven Lots, an approximately 400 unit apartment with 5,000 square feet (460 m^{2}) of commercial space. The project consists of 3 phases and has a planned cost of $80 million dollars.
