= Martinsburg Mining, Manufacturing, and Improvement Company =

Development company in Martinsburg, West Virginia

The Martinsburg Mining, Manufacturing, and Improvement Company was a company founded in 1890 in Martinsburg, West Virginia. The company developed the Boomtown Historic District and the Martinsburg Mining, Manufacturing & Improvement Co. Historic District. The company provided land for the Interwoven Mill.

In the early 1890's, the Martinsburg Mining, Manufacturing, and Improvement Company bought hundreds of acres on the south side of Martinsburg. The company organized its officials by spring of 1891.

== Boomtown Historic District ==
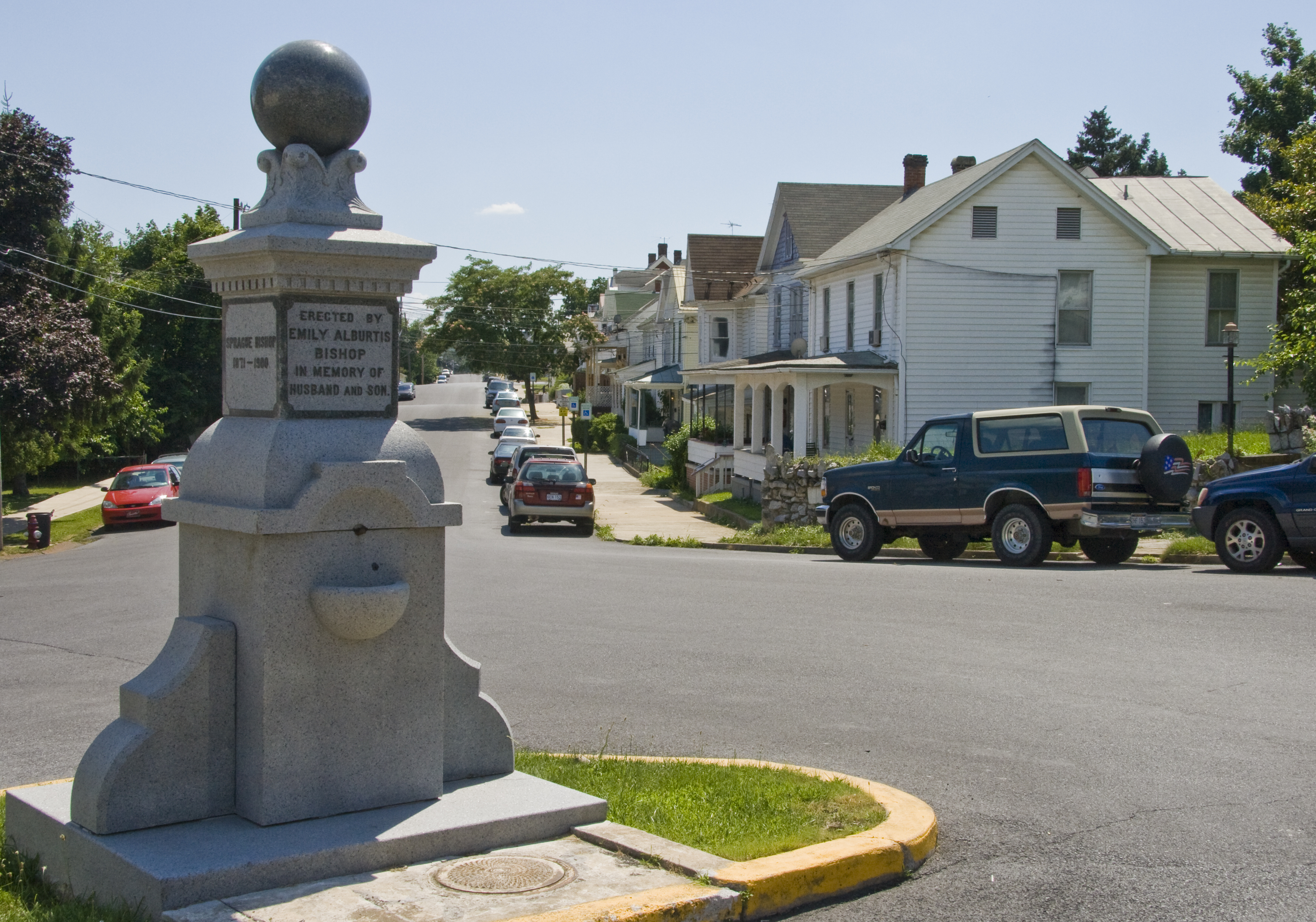
Fountain on Virginia Ave

The Boomtown Historic District consists of the western and southern portions of Martinsburg, West Virginia, generally along the alignments of West King Street and Winchester Avenue, developing alongside the town's electric streetcar system. It includes a former industrial section of the town, home to a number of textile mills, as well as the housing that was built for mill workers.

Boomtown's central core is along Virginia, West Virginia and Faulkner Avenues, centering on the fountain at Virginia and Faulkner. The area consists of primarily middle-class Victorian-style houses, in contrast to the more modest working-class houses on the opposite side of Winchester Avenue. The greatest building activity took place after 1891, when the Martinsburg Mining and Manufacturing Company developed the area in conjunction with the opening of streetcar service.

Industrial buildings include the former homes of the Shenandoah Pants Company, Brooklyn Brass Works and the Interwoven Mills. The Crawford Woolen and Cashmere Mills stand along Stephen Street.

The area was designated a historic district in 1980. It includes the separately-listed Abell-Kilbourn House.

== Martinsburg Mining, Manufacturing & Improvement Co. Historic District ==
- Martinsburg Mining, Manufacturing & Improvement Co. Historic District
- U.S. National Register of Historic Places
- U.S. Historic district
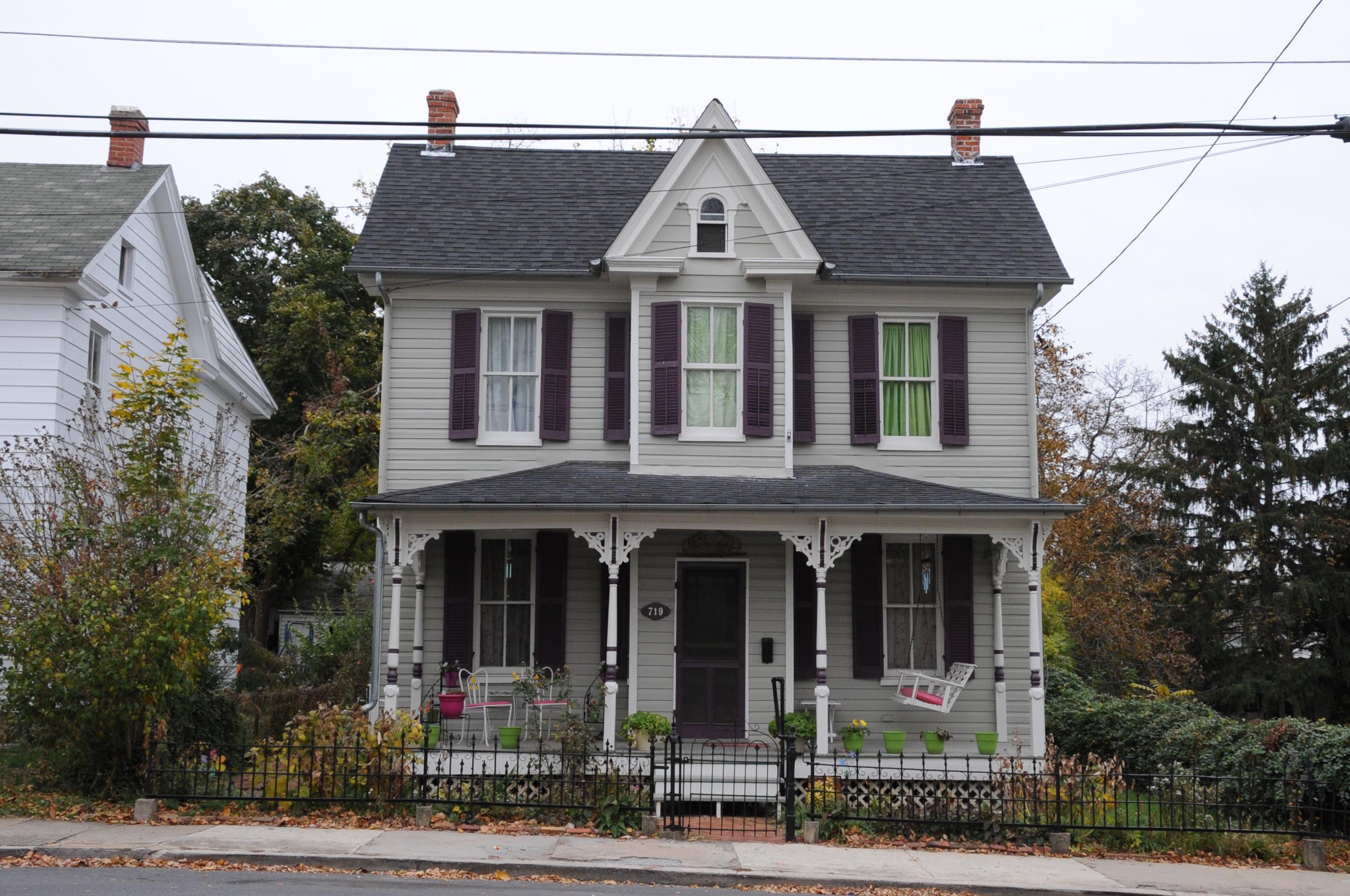
- House on Raleigh Street

- Location within West Virginia Location within the United States
- Location: New York, Virginia, West Virginia, Maryland, Florida, and Faulkner Avenues, Martinsburg, West Virginia
- Coordinates: 39°26′59″N 77°58′26″W
- Area: 64 acres (26 ha)
- Built: 1891
- Architectural style: Late Victorian, Late 19th And 20th Century Revivals
- NRHP reference No.: 02001519
- Added to NRHP: December 16, 2002

The Martinsburg Mining, Manufacturing & Improvement Co. Historic District is a national historic district located at Martinsburg, Berkeley County, West Virginia. It encompasses 289 contributing buildings located within 19 city blocks and built between 1891 and 1952. It includes a residential area developed by the Martinsburg Mining, Manufacturing & Improvement Co. as worker housing. They are one to 2 1/2-story, single family, detached, semi-detached, and multi-unit housing built in wood frame, brick or brick veneer, and concrete block. Also located in the district is the Gothic Revival-style St. Luke's United Methodist Church. It includes examples of vernacular interpretations of popular architectural styles including Queen Anne, American Four Square, and Bungalow styles.

It was listed on the National Register of Historic Places in 2002.

== See also ==
- Charles Town Mining, Manufacturing, and Improvement Company Building
