= WICL =

Radio station in Williamsport, Maryland

- Williamsport, Maryland; United States
- Broadcast area: Hagerstown metropolitan area
- Frequency: 95.9 MHz
- RDS: PI: 6a07; PS: 95.9 THE BIG DAWG; RT: Website
- Branding: 95-9 The Big Dawg

Programming
- Language: English
- Format: Classic country
- Affiliations: Compass Media Networks; Superadio Networks; Westwood One

Ownership
- Owner: WVRC Media; (West Virginia Radio Corporation of the Alleghenies)
- Sister stations: WEPM; WLTF; WXDC; WCST

History
- First air date: November 15, 1972
- Former call signs: WYII (1972–2000); WLTF (2000–2001); WKMZ (2001–2005)
- Call sign meaning: "Cool" (former branding)

Technical information
- Licensing authority: FCC
- Facility ID: 50058
- Class: A
- ERP: 3,300 watts
- HAAT: 91 meters (299 ft)
- Transmitter coordinates: 39°36′18.0″N 77°46′49.0″W

Links
- Public license information: Public file; LMS
- Webcast: Listen live; Listen live (via Audacy)
- Website: www.bigdawgfm.com

WICL (95.9 MHz) is a classic country formatted broadcast commercial radio station licensed to Williamsport, Maryland, serving the Hagerstown metropolitan area. WICL is owned and operated by John and David Raese, through licensee West Virginia Radio Corporation of the Alleghenies.

== History ==
Logo used from May 2009 to July 2012.

The station was started as WYII, a country music station, by Ken Smith on November 15, 1972. It operated this way until 2000, when it was bought by Prettyman Broadcasting Company. Also on December 26 of that year, it became soft adult contemporary formatted WLTF (which is now on 97.5).

On September 15, 2001, WLTF moved to 97.5 and then classic rocker WKMZ moved to 95.9. In 2005, WKMZ dropped its classic rock format for oldies and picked up the WICL calls. WICL dropped all on-air talent in 2008, airing programming directly from the True Oldies Channel network from ABC Radio. On July 4, 2012, WICL switched formats from oldies to classic hits under the branding "95.9 The Greatest Hits Of All Time".

On September 24, 2012, WICL switched from classic hits to classic country, a format previously abandoned by WNUZ (then WPPT) earlier in 2012, changing their branding to simply "95-9". On September 28, the station rebranded as "95-9 The Big Dawg" and morphed back into a country music format playing both classic and new country music.

== Location ==
While the station is licensed to Williamsport, Maryland, the studios for WICL are located in Martinsburg, West Virginia and the tower is located just south of Hagerstown, Maryland.

== Sale ==
On October 31, 2014, Prettyman Broadcasting announced the sale of WICL to West Virginia Radio Corporation (WVRC) for an unknown sum. Included in the same are sister stations WEPM and WLTF. WVRC assumed control of the stations, through a Local marketing agreement, on November 1. The purchase was consummated on February 13, 2015, at a price of $3 million.
