= WDLX =

Radio station in Washington, North Carolina

WDLX and WGHB

WDLX: Washington, North Carolina; WGHB: Farmville, North Carolina; United States
- Broadcast area: Greenville-New Bern
- Frequencies: WDLX: 930 kHz; WGHB: 1250 kHz
- Branding: Pirate Radio

Programming
- Format: Sports
- Affiliations: East Carolina University; Baltimore Orioles Radio Network

Ownership
- Owner: Pirate Media Group

History
- First air date: WDLX: March 2, 1942; WGHB: December 12, 1959
- Former call signs: WDLX: WRRF (1942–1962); WITN (1962–1985); WRRF (1985–1996); WGHB: WHTC (1959–1960); WFAG (1960–1979)

Technical information
- Licensing authority: FCC
- Facility ID: WDLX: 64610; WGHB: 56566
- Class: WDLX: B; WGHB: B
- Power: WDLX: 5,000 watts (day); 1,000 watts (night); WGHB: 5,000 watts (day); 2,500 watts (night)
- Transmitter coordinates: WDLX: 35°31′36″N 77°04′31″W; WGHB: 35°36′17″N 77°34′29″W
- Translator(s): WDLX: 104.1 W281CH (Washington); WGHB: 92.7 W224EI (Greenville)

Links
- Public license information: WDLX: Public file; LMS; WGHB: Public file; LMS
- Webcast: Listen Live
- Website: pirateradio930.com

WDLX (930 AM and 104.1 FM) and WGHB (1250 AM and 92.7 FM) are radio stations broadcasting a sports format. The WDLX/WGHB simulcast is currently owned by Pirate Media Group, LLC.

Licensed to Washington, North Carolina, United States, WDLX serves the Greenville-New Bern area. The station signed on the air March 3, 1942 as WRRF. The calls stood for "We Radiate Real Friendship". In 1962, the call letters were changed to WITN, owing largely to the eyeWITNess news format adopted by owner Bill Roberson's television station, WITN-TV. Roberson had also signed on sister FM station WITN-FM at 93.3 MHz (today's WERO) on September 6, 1961. These stations shared the same callsigns on FM and AM until 1985, when the FM facility became WDLX and the AM reverted to the WRRF calls. They shared the same building until about 2004.

In 1996, new owner Pinnacle Broadcasting changed the calls for WDLX to WERO as the station adopted an Arrow 93.3 moniker and a classic hits format; to protect the copyright to the call letters, they switched WRRF to WDLX, although no change was made in its talk format.

WDLX and WGHB now operate as 104.1 FM and 92.7 FM in the Greenville/Washington/New Bern media market. They are simulcast and they operate as Pirate Radio. They are known as "The Voice of the Pirate Nation." The current format is sports talk radio and they have and they broadcast live shows from Greenville, NC. They are focused around East Carolina University Athletics with live local shows Pirate Radio Live (3-6 PM weekly), The Brian Bailey Show, and the Holton Ahlers Show (among others). During ECU Football games, they host a pregame show as well as a post game call-in show. Starting in 2010, WDLX aired the Baltimore Orioles.

These two stations are not related to pirate radio, deriving their name instead from the East Carolina University Pirates.
