= WLVX =

- Westminster, Maryland; United States
- Broadcast area: Baltimore metropolitan area
- Frequency: 100.7 MHz (HD Radio)
- Branding: K-Love

Programming
- Language: English
- Format: Christian adult contemporary
- Network: K-Love

Ownership
- Owner: Educational Media Foundation; (K-LOVE, Inc.)

History
- First air date: November 1, 1959
- Former call signs: WTTR-FM (1959–1984); WGRX (1984–1999); WZBA (1999–2026)

Technical information
- Licensing authority: FCC
- Facility ID: 59985
- Class: B
- ERP: 25,000 watts (analog); 2,500 watts (digital)
- HAAT: 210 meters (690 ft)
- Transmitter coordinates: 39°26′50.4″N 76°46′46.9″W
- Translator: See § Translators

Links
- Public license information: Public file; LMS
- Webcast: Listen live (via TuneIn); Listen live (via iHeartRadio)
- Website: www.klove.com

WLVX (100.7 FM) is a non-commercial radio station licensed to serve Westminster, Maryland. The station is an affiliate of Christian adult contemporary network K-Love and is owned by Educational Media Foundation. The station's broadcast tower is located near Owings Mills at (39°26′49.9″N 76°46′47.2″W).

The station's service contour covers the Baltimore metropolitan area and southern portions of South Central Pennsylvania.

== History ==
Engineer Russ Morgan signed on the station for the first time on November 1, 1959, as WTTR-FM, a simulcast partner of Westminster's WTTR (1470 AM).

Shamrock Communications purchased the station on April 7, 1981, and changed the format to easy listening. The station's call sign was changed to WGRX in 1984, with a format change to "Eclectic Oriented Rock". Shamrock moved the station to a new 17 kW signal from a tower in Hampstead in late 1986, and the format changed to classic rock in May 1987.

WGRX changed its format to modern rock on December 2, 1994, branded as The X. In April 1996, the station fired its program director and six DJs, then aired a weekend-long stunt of disco music as "Polyester 101" before switching to a country music format on May 6, 1996, branded as "Froggy 100.7". The station later rebranded as "New Country 100.7".

On December 1, 1999, due to declining ratings, the station switched its call sign to WZBA, rebranded as 100.7 The Bay and flipped to a rock-based adult contemporary format, with the slogan "Rock Without the Hard Edge".

In 2001, WZBA relocated again to a new 27 kW signal from a tower in Owings Mills, closer to Baltimore proper and co-located with its Maryland Public Broadcasting television station WMPB.

The station changed its format back to classic rock when WXFB flipped to smooth jazz on September 5, 2003.

Jefferson Ward, the station's general manager, retired in 2021.

In June 2026, it was announced that Shamrock Communications would sell WZBA to K-Love, Inc., which operates the contemporary Christian music networks K-Love and Air1. At the time of the sale, Baltimore was the largest market in which K-Love, Inc. did not operate a station. Classic rock programming on the station ended at midnight on August 13, 2026, and it signed off with "Stairway to Heaven" by Led Zeppelin before flipping to K-Love.

== Signal note ==
WLVX is short-spaced to two other Class B stations operating on 100.7 MHz: WLEV 100.7 WLEV (licensed to serve Allentown, Pennsylvania) and WZXL 100.7 ZXL (licensed to serve Wildwood, New Jersey). The distance between WLVX's transmitter and WLEV's transmitter is only 105 miles (169 km), while the distance between WLVX's transmitter and WZXL's transmitter is only 110 miles (180 km), as determined by FCC rules. The minimum distance between two Class B stations operating on the same channel according to current Federal Communications Commission rules is 150 miles (240 km).

== Translators ==
WLVX programming is broadcast on the following translators:

Call sign	Frequency	City of license	FID	ERP (W)	HAAT	Class	Transmitter coordinates	FCC info
W261CD	100.1 FM	Baltimore, Maryland	59981	2	93 m (305 ft)	D	39°17′12.3″N 76°36′30.8″W	LMS
W298CG	107.5 FM	Bel Air, Maryland	86135	250	0 m (0 ft)	D	39°32′05.5″N 76°20′25.5″W	LMS
