= Shannondale, West Virginia =

- Census-designated place
- Location within West Virginia Location within the United States
- Coordinates: 39°12′44″N 77°48′38″W
- Country: United States
- State: West Virginia
- County: Jefferson

Area
  - Total: 8.745 sq mi (22.65 km^{2})
  - Land: 8.428 sq mi (21.83 km^{2})
  - Water: 0.317 sq mi (0.82 km^{2})
- Elevation: 558 ft (170 m)

Population (2020)
  - Total: 3,487
  - Density: 413.7/sq mi (159.7/km^{2})
- Time zone: UTC-5 (Eastern (EST))
  - Summer (DST): UTC-4 (EDT)
- GNIS feature ID: 2586881

Shannondale is a census-designated place (CDP) in Jefferson County, West Virginia, United States. As of the 2020 census, its population was 3,487 (up from 3,358 at the 2010 census).

== History ==
Originally conceived as a respite from the city to be used in the Spring and Summer by urbanites occupying vacation cottages. Shannondale is nestled between the Shenandoah River and the Appalachian Trail on the western slope of the Blue Ridge Mountain. The name Shannondale first appears in public records in January 1740. It referred to a 29,120-acre (118 km^{2}) parcel conveyed by Lord Thomas Fairfax to his nephew William Fairfax which contained the spa and resort of Shannondale Springs.

The modern Shannondale Community in Jefferson County was established in the mid-1950s by Charles M. Johnson, an engineer and real estate broker. He realized the potential of the property surrounding the Shannondale Springs as a retreat for residents of the Baltimore and Washington area. He invited people to come and enjoy the beauty of the Blue Ridge Mountains and the Shenandoah River. In 1955, the first road was built in the development then consisting of 2500 acres (10 km^{2}). Three years later, an Adirondack styled lodge, bath house, as well as an Olympic-sized swimming pool had been constructed, in addition to the recreational and camping facilities along the river. During that period, many summer vacation homes were built and more than 20 miles (32 km) of rugged road was put into use. Over time, the developer acquired more than 5,000 acres (20 km^{2}) making Shannondale arguably the largest subdivision in the State of West Virginia (in surface area).

In 1961, work commenced on an earthen dam to impound a 65-acre (260,000 m^{2}) lake adjacent to and partially surrounding the clubhouse and pool. When it was completed, the lake was the largest in the state owned by a private entity. Building and membership in the community club (membership was concomitant with the purchase of development property) increased dramatically with the lake's completion. By 1970, Shannondale consisted of more than 500 homes, many of which were converted to full-time residences, and over 40 miles (64 km) of roads. C. M. Johnson remains one of the few developers of "Shannondale style" communities who delivered what was promised to its membership.

The club relinquished its private status in 1972 and was bought by a consortium of members in 1978. As a result of changing demographics and the loss of operating capital from land sales, the operation never regained the luster of the years of the late 1950s and 1960s. The club is now privately owned and operated as The Mountain Lake Club. The Lodge (formerly the Clubhouse) was destroyed by a tragic fire on June 19, 2003. The investigation into the cause of the conflagration has stalled, likely for good. The owners lack of adequate insurance (30k on a structure valued at 1.5M) virtually guarantees the club house will never be re-built. In fact, the area is now considered historic ruins.

The surrounding community now consists of more than 1200 homes, most of which are inhabited on a full-time basis. The over 70 miles (110 km) of roads present are now maintained by the State of West Virginia.
