= WLTF =

Adult contemporary radio station in Martinsburg, West Virginia

- Martinsburg, West Virginia; United States
- Broadcast area: Hagerstown metropolitan area; Winchester metropolitan area
- Frequency: 97.5 MHz
- RDS: PI: 73a7; PS: TODAY'S 97.5; RT: Website
- Branding: Today's 97-5

Programming
- Language: English
- Format: Adult contemporary
- Affiliations: Compass Media Networks; West Virginia MetroNews; Westwood One

Ownership
- Owner: WVRC Media; (West Virginia Radio Corporation of the Alleghenies)
- Sister stations: WEPM; WICL; WXDC; WCST

History
- First air date: 1949
- Former call signs: WEPM-FM (1949–1973); WESM (1973–1981); WKMZ (1981–2001); WLTF (2001–2017); WKMZ-FM (2017–2019)
- Former frequencies: 94.3 MHz (1949–1962)
- Call sign meaning: "Lite FM" (former branding)

Technical information
- Licensing authority: FCC
- Facility ID: 53486
- Class: B
- ERP: 11,500 watts
- HAAT: 316 meters (1,037 ft)
- Transmitter coordinates: 39°27′33″N 78°03′47″W

Links
- Public license information: Public file; LMS
- Webcast: Listen live; Listen live (via Audacy)
- Website: todays975.com

WLTF is an American radio station licensed to Martinsburg, West Virginia. Owned by WVRC Media, it currently broadcasts an adult contemporary format.

Its signal covers the "four state" region, east into Washington, DC, south to Luray, Virginia, west into Grantsville, Maryland, and north into Altoona, Pennsylvania, although the station primarily targets Martinsburg.

== History ==
In September 1981, WESM changed their format from adult contemporary to album-oriented rock, branded as "K 97.5", and changed its call sign to WKMZ. In the mid-80s, the station was an affiliate of ABC Direction Network.

In January 1987, WKMZ changed their format from album-oriented rock to Top 40/CHR, branded as "Power 97-5 KMZ". In the early 90s, the station was an affiliate of CNN Headline News.

In March 1992, WIKZ dropped the Top 40 format in favor of adult contemporary as Mix 95, leaving WKMZ as the only Top 40 station in the Hagerstown market.

In August 1993, WKMZ changed their format from Top 40/CHR to classic rock.

On September 15, 2001, WKMZ moved down the dial to 95.9 frequency, and WLTF moved up the dial to the stronger 97.5 frequency.

On October 31, 2014, Prettyman Broadcasting announced the sale of WLTF to West Virginia Radio Corporation (WVRC) for an unknown sum. Included in the same were sister stations WEPM and WICL. WVRC assumed control of the stations, through a local marketing agreement, on November 1. The purchase was consummated on February 13, 2015, at a price of $3 million.

On November 24, 2017, the station flipped back to a CHR format and changed its call sign back to WKMZ-FM. The station was unable to reclaim its legacy WKMZ callsign due to the existence of WKMZ-LP in Ruckersville, Virginia.

On April 24, 2019, the station changed its call sign back to WLTF.

On April 30, 2019, WLTF dropped the CHR format again, as "97.5 WKMZ" and began stunting with Christmas music as "Santa 97.5". At Midnight, on May 1, 2019, the stunting ended and the format of WLTF flipped back to adult contemporary branded as "Today's 97-5".
