= WTTR =

- Westminster, Maryland; United States
- Broadcast area: Westminster, Maryland; Carroll County, Maryland
- Frequency: 1470 kHz
- Branding: FM 102.3 & AM 1470 WTTR

Programming
- Language: English
- Format: Full service classic hits
- Affiliations: Baltimore Orioles Radio Network; Baltimore Ravens Radio Network; Westwood One

Ownership
- Owner: Hilltop Communications, LLC

History
- First air date: 1953

Technical information
- Licensing authority: FCC
- Facility ID: 59975
- Class: B
- Power: 540 watts (day); 35 watts (night)
- Transmitter coordinates: 39°34′37″N 77°1′21″W
- Translators: 93.5 W228EI (Eldersburg); 102.3 W272CX (Westminster)

Links
- Public license information: Public file; LMS
- Webcast: Listen live
- Website: www.wttr.com

WTTR (1470 AM) is a full service and classic hits broadcast radio station licensed to Westminster, Maryland, serving Carroll County, Maryland. WTTR is owned and operated by Hilltop Communications, LLC.

== History ==
WTTR was placed on the air in 1953 by local businessman Russ Morgan. The first song broadcast was the Star Spangled Banner on the 4th of July. Carroll County Broadcasting Company retained ownership of WTTR and WTTR-FM until the stations were sold to Shamrock Broadcasting in the early 1980s.

In 1981, WTTR changed format to adult contemporary, operating as a daytime only station known as Carroll Community Radio. The station had a full-time news team and three full time DJs. In 1984, Shamrock was granted permission by the Federal Communications Commission (FCC) to allow WTTR to broadcast at night, adding two additional towers at its Uniontown Road studios in Westminster. The station broadcast a successful middle of the road format dubbed Nightime Nostalgia hosted by DJ Steve Spencer and played big band standards from the 1940s and 1950s. At the same time, WTTR-FM switched its long time association with the Baltimore Orioles to WTTR AM.

Well known DJ Dwight Dingle, a retired school teacher joined WTTR part time in 1974 and later became operations manager and then General Manager in 1986 until his death in November 2009. He was tightly involved with the community serving on the Carroll County Chamber of Commerce.

WTTR is also known for its local sports content broadcasting weekly high school football and basketball games as well as Western Maryland College games and Babe Ruth Baseball play by play. Dwight Dingle and Charlie Beckhardt provided the play by play. The duo also created the Carroll County High School Athlete of the Week award, honoring local athletic accomplishments.

Shamrock moved WTTR-FM to Baltimore in 1984 and constructed a new tower in Hampstead to increase its signal to Baltimore. The station changed its call letters to WGRX, eventually became WZBA, and was retained by Shamrock until 2026; it was then acquired by K-Love Inc. and became WLVX.

Shamrock sold WTTR to Pat Sajak's Sajak Broadcasting Corporation in 2005. In late September 2013, Sajak Broadcasting announced an agreement to sell WTTR to the newly formed Hilltop Communications, LLC. Hilltop assumed ownership on December 19, 2013.

On January 1, 2014, WTTR shifted their format from oldies to classic hits of the 1960s, 1970s, and 1980s.

On July 18, 2016, WTTR went live with its 102.3 FM translator frequency.
