= East Martinsburg Historic District =

Historic district in West Virginia, United States

- U.S. National Register of Historic Places
- U.S. Historic district
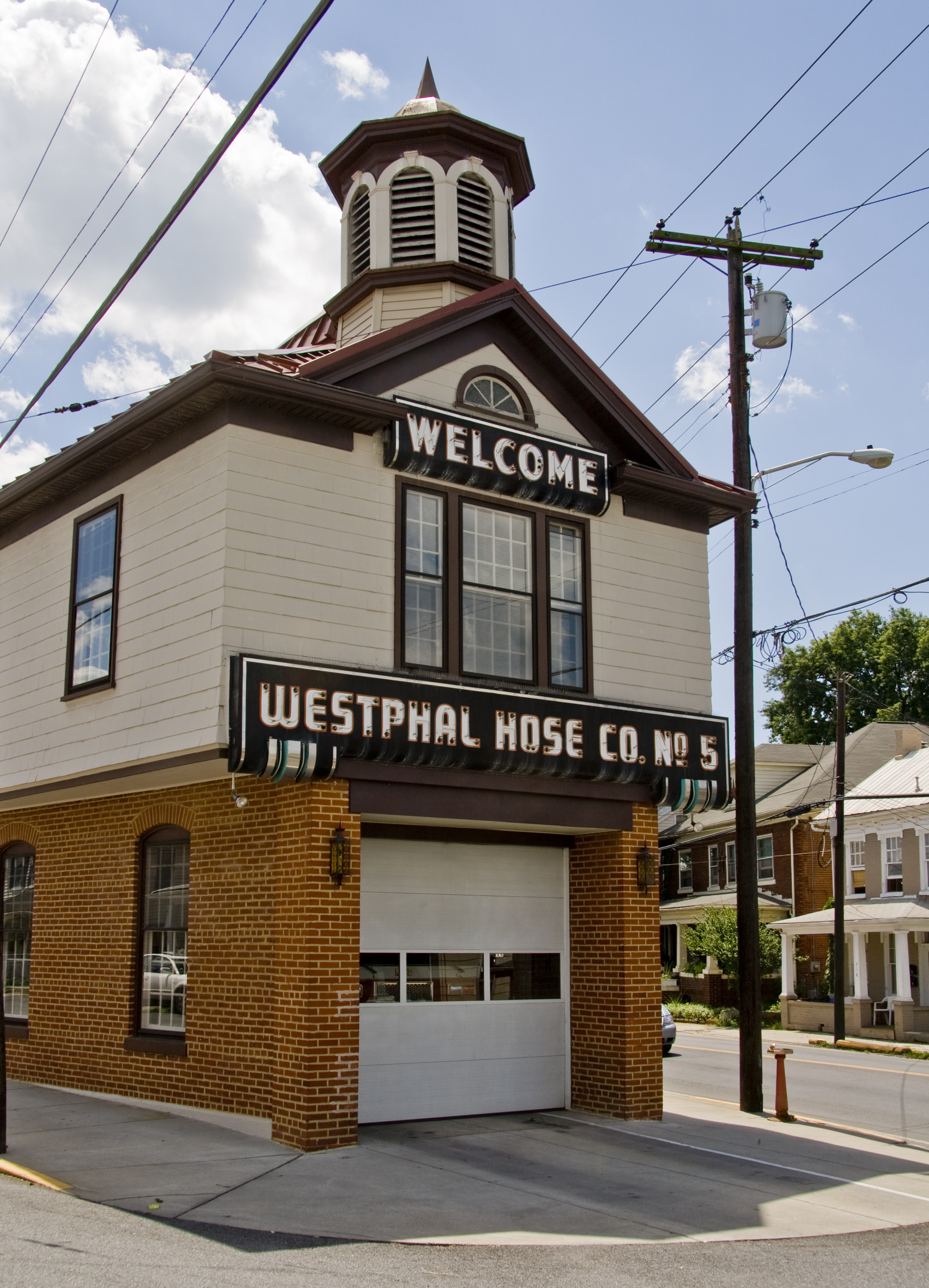
- Whestphal Hose Company in the East Martinsburg district

- Location within West Virginia Location within the United States
- Location: Roughly bounded by B&O RR right-of-way, N. Queen St., Moler Ave., and High St., Martinsburg, West Virginia
- Coordinates: 39°27′40″N 77°57′19″W
- Architect: Multiple
- Architectural style: Queen Anne, Federal, Federal
- MPS: Berkeley County MRA
- NRHP reference No.: 80004417
- Added to NRHP: December 10, 1980

The East Martinsburg Historic District is associated with the growth of Martinsburg, West Virginia during the 1850s, when the development of the Baltimore and Ohio Railroad brought German and Irish settlers to the area. The district includes areas known as Buena Vista, Chevally City, St. Vincent, Hooge's Addition, Small's Addition, Carver's Addition, Mohler's Addition, Strinesville and East Strinesville.

The oldest sections of the district have concentrations of pre-Civil War buildings in the Greek Revival style, while later sections include Gothic Revival, Queen Anne and Classical Revival buildings.

The district was listed on the National Register of Historic Places in 1980.
