= WCST (AM) =

- Berkeley Springs, West Virginia; United States
- Broadcast area: Eastern Panhandle of West Virginia; Western Maryland; Potomac Highlands of West Virginia
- Frequency: 1010 kHz
- Branding: The Panhandle News Network

Programming
- Language: English
- Format: Talk and sports radio
- Affiliations: ESPN Radio; Fox News Radio; West Virginia MetroNews

Ownership
- Owner: WVRC Media; (West Virginia Radio Corporation of the Alleghenies)
- Sister stations: WXDC; WLTF; WICL; WEPM

History
- First air date: September 7, 1958
- Call sign meaning: Charles Samuel Trump, one of the original owners

Technical information
- Licensing authority: FCC
- Facility ID: 68205
- Class: D
- Power: 270 watts (day); 17 watts (night)
- Transmitter coordinates: 39°37′0.0″N 78°13′3.0″W
- Translator: 93.5 W228DU (Berkeley Springs)

Links
- Public license information: Public file; LMS
- Webcast: Listen live; Listen live (via Audacy)
- Website: panhandlenewsnetwork.com

WCST (1010 kHz) is a commercial talk and sports radio formatted broadcast AM radio station licensed to Berkeley Springs, West Virginia, serving Berkeley Springs and Morgan County, West Virginia. WCST is owned by John and David Raese's WVRC Media, through licensee West Virginia Radio Corporation of the Alleghenies. WCST simulcasts Martinsburg, West Virginia-based sister-station WEPM.

== History ==
WCST signed on the air on September 7, 1958. WCST started with Dale Brooks, Tom Butcher, Kenny Robertson and Gary Daniels. They offered local programming, advertising and rock n' roll music. The call letters of the station were a tribute to Charles S. Trump, a major force behind getting the station on the air.

WCST adopted FM in 1965, and changed its genre to country music with the frequency 93.5. It was sold in the 1980s to Sam and Mary Lou Trump and later to Emmett Capper in 1995.

For many years WCST played country music, 23 hours a day; why they went off the air for just one hour remains a mystery. AM1010 was reported to be dark several times, but is just a tough catch even within town limits due to a bad tower location and tower ground system.

In the summer of 2006, Berkeley Springs High School games and other local programming, which were heard on sister station WDHC, were moved to WCST when WDHC moved to 92.9.

Also in 2006, WCST and WDHC finally made a presence on the internet of sorts, with a MySpace Group operated by employees of the station. Currently, WCST and WXDC (formerly WDHC) each have an active Facebook page.

In March 2014, WCST changed its format from news/talk to country, with the branding "Cat Country 1010AM WCST".

In January 2017, WCST was sold with sister station WDHC (now WXDC) to Metro Radio of Fairfax, Virginia, who owns WTNT in the Washington D.C. radio market. The sale was consummated on March 1, at a price of $365,000.

In May, WCST began simulcasting the classic hits format of WXDC, which flipped to oldies at the beginning of 2018.

WCST was granted a construction permit for FM translator W228DU on January 11, 2018. The translator rebroadcasts WCST on 93.5 FM from the WXDC/WCST transmitter site east of Berkeley Springs.

Former logo

On May 1, 2019, West Virginia Radio Corporation began operating WCST and WXDC as it began the process of buying the stations from Metro Radio. The local marketing agreement with Diane Smith ended on April 30, 2019. At midnight on May 1, 2019, WCST's programming shifted from a simulcast of WXDC to a simulcast of Martinsburg-based WEPM's news/talk/sports under the branding "The Panhandle News Network". The sale, at a price of $365,000, was consummated on March 3, 2021.

== Translator ==
In addition to the main station, WCST is relayed by an FM translator to widen its broadcast area.

Call sign	Frequency	City of license	FID	ERP (W)	HAAT	Class	FCC info
W228DU	93.5 FM	Berkeley Springs, West Virginia	199987	100 watts	376 m (1,234 ft)	D	LMS
