= WXDC =

Classic hits radio station in Berkeley Springs, Virginia

- Berkeley Springs, West Virginia; United States
- Broadcast area: Eastern Panhandle of West Virginia; Western Maryland; South Central Pennsylvania
- Frequency: 92.9 MHz
- RDS: PI: 91b4; PTY: Classic Rock; RT: Website MORGAN COUNTY'S GREATEST HITS
- Branding: Cool 92.9

Programming
- Language: English
- Format: Classic hits
- Affiliations: Compass Media Networks; United Stations Radio Networks; West Virginia Mountaineers; West Virginia MetroNews

Ownership
- Owner: WVRC Media; (West Virginia Radio Corporation of the Alleghenies)
- Sister stations: WCST; WEPM; WICL; WLTF

History
- First air date: December 1965
- Former call signs: WCST-FM (1965–1996); WDHC (1996–2017)
- Former frequencies: 93.5 MHz (1965–2005)

Technical information
- Licensing authority: FCC
- Facility ID: 68204
- Class: A
- ERP: 3,200 watts
- HAAT: 139 meters (456 ft)
- Transmitter coordinates: 39°37′0.0″N 78°13′3.0″W

Links
- Public license information: Public file; LMS
- Webcast: Listen live
- Website: 929wxdc.com

WXDC (92.9 MHz, Cool 92-9) is a classic hits formatted broadcast commercial radio station licensed to Berkeley Springs, West Virginia, serving Martinsburg in West Virginia and Hancock in Maryland. WXDC is owned by WVRC Media, through their West Virginia Radio Corporation of the Alleghenies licensee.

WVRC Media began operating WXDC and sister-station WCST on May 1, 2019, as they begin the process of buying the two stations from Metro Radio, Inc.

== History ==
The station came on the air as WCST-FM in December 1965, but later changed to WDHC with the "Down Home County" branding in 1996. WDHC was originally on 93.5 FM and moved to 92.9 FM in 2005, with a taller tower and twice the original size and double the original power of 93.5. WXDC's distant grade signal can be heard in Winchester, Virginia, Hagerstown, Maryland and Martinsburg, West Virginia.

In April 2009, WDHC DJ Travis Lee, 27, known on the air as "Mr. T", was killed by a train while camping with friends in Morgan County, West Virginia.

In 2011, WDHC switched their branding from "Down Home Country" to "Country 92-9" and to a more mainstream country music format, as well as updating their website. In March 2014, WDHC dropped its longtime country format for a hybrid classic hits/classic Top 40 format as "Max 92-9".

In January 2017, WDHC was sold to Metro Radio of Fairfax, Virginia, who owns WTNT in the Washington market. The purchase was consummated on March 1, at a price of $365,000. Metro fired the entire staff, changed the callsign to WXDC, and began simulcasting WTNT's Spanish-language programming on March 8. Due to community backlash, Metro Radio entered into a local marketing agreement with Hancock, Maryland restaurant owner Diane Smith, who flipped the station back to English-language classic hits "Max 92-9" on May 1. On January 1, 2018, WXDC changed to oldies from classic hits.

On May 1, 2019, West Virginia Radio Corporation began operating WXDC and sister station WCST as it began the process of buying the stations from Metro Radio. The local marketing agreement with Diane Smith ended on April 30. At 9 am, on May 1, WXDC relaunched their oldies format as "Cool 92-9". On October 11, WXDC shifted back from oldies to classic hits. On March 1, 2020, WXDC changed their format from classic hits back to their longtime country music format. The purchase, at a price of $365,000, was consummated on March 3, 2021.

On October 23, 2023, WXDC changed their format from country back to classic hits, and returned to the "Cool 92-9" branding.
