= WEPM =

- Martinsburg, West Virginia; United States
- Broadcast area: Eastern Panhandle of West Virginia
- Frequency: 1340 kHz
- Branding: The Panhandle News Network

Programming
- Language: English
- Format: News/talk and sports radio
- Affiliations: Baltimore Ravens; ESPN Radio; Fox News Radio; West Virginia MetroNews; West Virginia Mountaineers

Ownership
- Owner: WVRC Media; (West Virginia Radio Corporation of the Alleghenies)
- Sister stations: WICL; WLTF; WXDC; WCST

History
- First air date: October 13, 1946
- Call sign meaning: Eastern Panhandle Mountaineer

Technical information
- Licensing authority: FCC
- Facility ID: 53484
- Class: C
- Power: 1,000 watts (unlimited)
- Transmitter coordinates: 39°27′48.0″N 77°59′11.0″W

Links
- Public license information: Public file; LMS
- Webcast: Listen live; Listen live (via Audacy)
- Website: panhandlenewsnetwork.com

WEPM (1340 kHz The Panhandle News Network) is a news/talk and sports radio formatted broadcast AM radio station licensed to Martinsburg, West Virginia, serving the Eastern Panhandle of West Virginia. WEPM is owned and operated by John and David Raese, through licensee West Virginia Radio Corporation of the Alleghenies.

== History ==
Owner C. Leslie Golliday, a prominent Martinsburg businessman, envisioned a group of stations in the state, and his early announcers used the tag line, "This is the Mountaineer station for the Eastern Panhandle", thus the call sign there of WEPM. Another suggested meaning for EPM is "Eastern Panhandle, Martinsburg".

Golliday also owned WCLG in Morgantown, WV which carried a similar tag line, "This is the Mountaineer station for northern West Virginia".

Golliday died in late June 2007, at the age of 92.

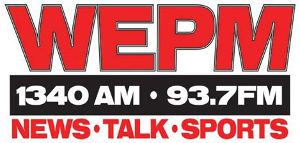
Logo before prioritizing the translator over the AM

== Sale ==
On October 31, 2014, Prettyman Broadcasting announced the sale of WEPM to West Virginia Radio Corporation (WVRC) for an unknown sum. Included in the same are sister stations WICL and WLTF. WVRC assumed control of the stations, through a Local marketing agreement, on November 1. The purchase was consummated on February 13, 2015, at a price of $3 million.

== Translator ==
In addition to the main station, WEPM is relayed by an FM translator to widen its broadcast area.

Call sign	Frequency	City of license	FID	ERP (W)	HAAT	Class	FCC info
W229CM	93.7 FM	Martinsburg, West Virginia	154324	250 watts	44 m (144 ft)	D	LMS
