= Charles Town Mining, Manufacturing, and Improvement Company Building =

- U.S. National Register of Historic Places
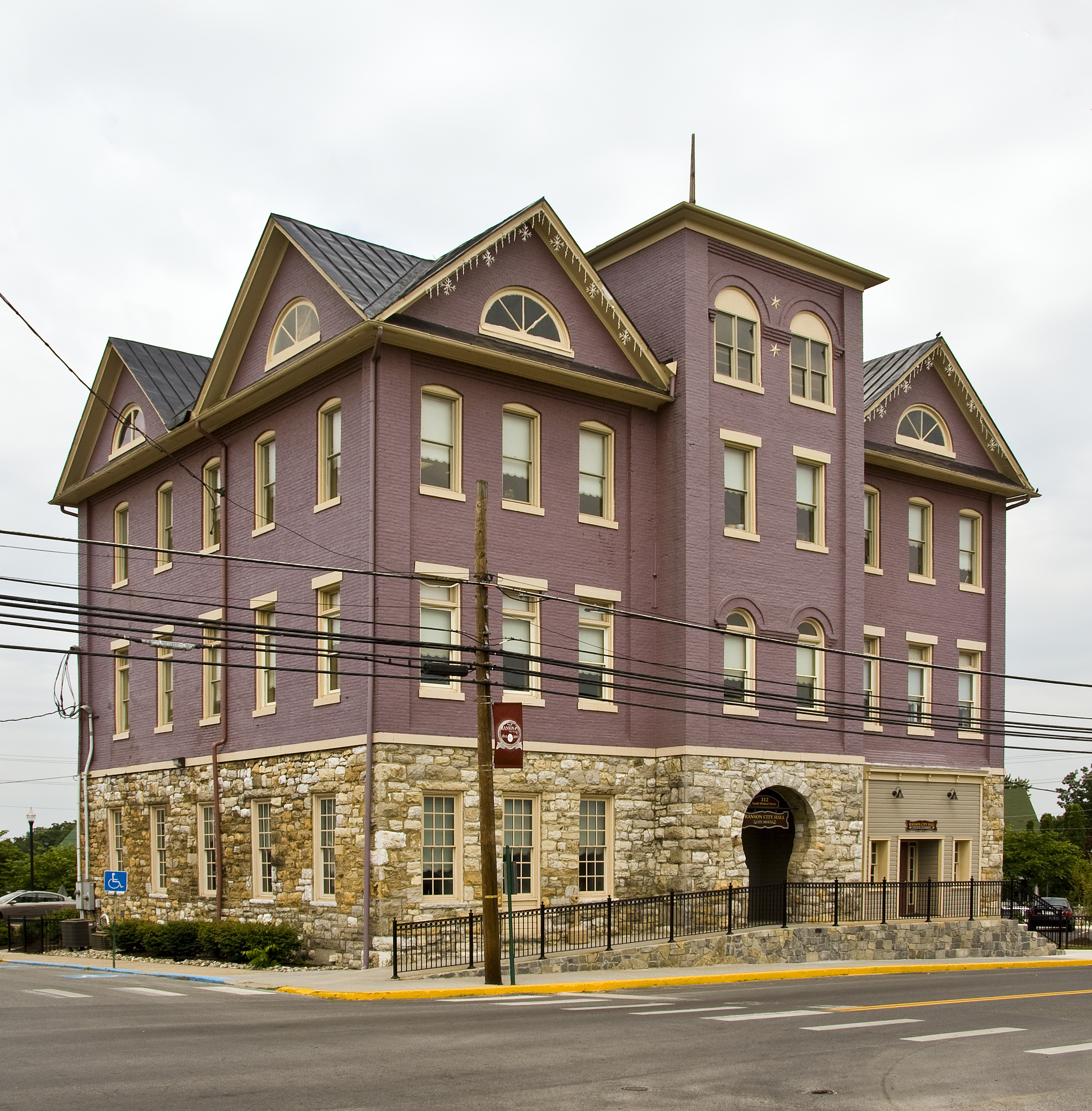
- Ranson City Hall, June 2011

- Location within West Virginia Location within the United States
- Location: 312 S. Mildred St., Ranson, West Virginia
- Coordinates: 39°17′40″N 77°51′38″W
- Built: 1891
- Architect: Holmes, Julius C.
- Architectural style: Romanesque
- NRHP reference No.: 01000779
- Added to NRHP: August 2, 2001

The Charles Town Mining, Manufacturing, and Improvement Company Building in Ranson, Jefferson County, West Virginia is a Romanesque Revival building that now serves as Ranson's City Hall. It was built for the Charles Town Mining, Manufacturing and Improvement Company (CMM&I) in 1891 as its headquarters. The CMM&I sought to develop industry in the area that in 1910 became the City of Ranson. The company was formed in 1890 by Roger Preston Chew, Frank Beck, Forrest W. Brown, T.C. Green, W.F. Lippitt, A.W. McDonald and B. C. Washington, with Chew as president. Using 850 acres (3.4 km^{2}) of land purchased from the Ranson family, a planned community was laid out by D.G. Howell, a Washington, D.C. landscape architect and civil engineer. In 1891 the 3½ story headquarters was built, designed by J.C. Holmes.

By 1893 the CMM&I was facing hard times, possibly as a result of the Panic of 1893, and the headquarters was sold to the Board of Education of Charles Town, and served as the white Charles Town High School from 1893 to 1912. The school was sometimes known as both the "Keyhole School,” due to its distinctive entrance, and as the Wright Denny School. In 1917 the Board of Education sold the school to former mayor Gerard D. Moore, and upon his death the property went to H.C. Getzendanner for $4500. Part of the building was used as a confectionery and the north half became the Ranson Post Office. In 1936 the City of Ranson bought the building for $3000 as its City Hall, although apartments occupied the upper floors until the 1970s.

== See also ==
- Martinsburg Mining, Manufacturing and Improvement Company
