= WHAP =

- Hopewell, Virginia; United States
- Broadcast area: Petersburg, Virginia
- Frequency: 1340 kHz
- Branding: The Point

Programming
- Format: Country music

Ownership
- Owner: Bruce D. Gee and David E. Gee; (Gee Communications, Inc.)

History
- First air date: January 16, 1949
- Call sign meaning: Hopewell And Petersburg

Technical information
- Licensing authority: FCC
- Facility ID: 33900
- Class: C
- Power: 1,000 watts (unlimited)
- Transmitter coordinates: 37°17′46.0″N 77°18′50.0″W
- Translator: 96.9 W245CU (Hopewell)

Links
- Public license information: Public file; LMS
- Webcast: Listen live
- Website: whapradio.com

WHAP (1340 AM) is a country music formatted broadcast radio station licensed to Hopewell, Virginia, serving Petersburg, Virginia. WHAP is owned by Bruce D. Gee and Davie E. Gee, through licensee Gee Communications, Inc.

== Frequencies ==
WHAP broadcasts on 1340 kHz at 1000 watts 24 hours/day. The station has authorization for an FM Translator at 96.9 MHz at 250 watts with callsign W245CU.

== History ==
The station first signed on the air on January 16, 1949, as WHAP. It was originally licensed to the Hopewell Broadcasting Company and served as the primary local radio outlet for Hopewell and surrounding Prince George County. The call letters were chosen to represent "Hopewell And Petersburg".

Throughout the 1960s and 1970s, WHAP maintained a full-service middle-of-the-road (MOR) and adult contemporary format, often emphasizing local news and high school sports. In 1988, the station was acquired by Gee Communications, Inc., owned by Bruce and David Gee, who transitioned the station to a country music format branded as "The Point".

In the early 2010s, the station briefly shifted to a sports talk format as an affiliate of Fox Sports Radio, branded as "Fox Sports 1340," before eventually returning to its country roots. As of 2025, the station continues to operate from its studio location in Hopewell, simulcasting its programming on FM translator W245CU at 96.9 MHz .

== Status ==
As of May 9th, 2026 the 1340 kHz AM signal is silent and the FM translator signal is present.
