= Martinsburg, West Virginia =

City in West Virginia, United States

- City
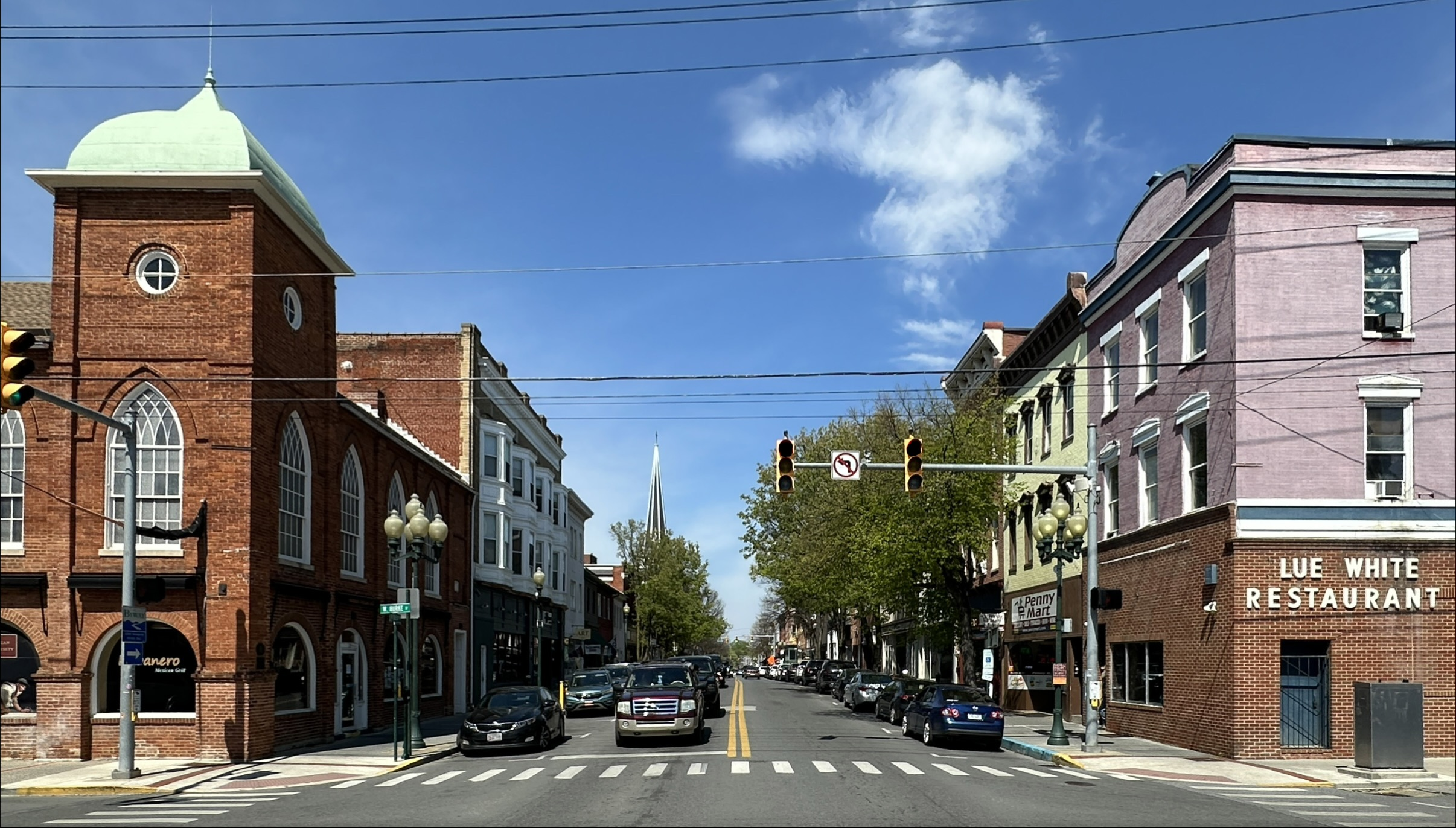
- Downtown Martinsburg Historic District

- Flag Seal
- Interactive map of Martinsburg, West Virginia
- Location within West Virginia Location within the United States
- Coordinates: 39°27′13″N 77°59′44″W
- Country: United States
- State: West Virginia
- County: Berkeley
- Chartered: 1778
- Incorporated: March 30, 1868

Government
  - Mayor: Kevin Knowles (D)

Area
  - City: 6.65 sq mi (17.22 km^{2})
  - Land: 6.63 sq mi (17.17 km^{2})
  - Water: 0.015 sq mi (0.04 km^{2})
- Elevation: 495 ft (151 m)

Population (2020)
  - City: 18,777
  - Estimate (2019): 18,835
  - Density: 2,632.2/sq mi (1,016.31/km^{2})
  - Urban: 43,441
  - Metro: 260,070 (US: 167th)
- Time zone: UTC−5 (EST)
  - Summer (DST): UTC−4 (EDT)
- ZIP codes: 25401–25405
- Area code: 304 681
- FIPS code: 54-52060
- GNIS feature ID: 2390615
- Website: cityofmartinsburg.org

Martinsburg is a city in Berkeley County, West Virginia, United States, and its county seat. The population was 18,773 at the 2020 census, making Martinsburg the largest city in the eastern panhandle of West Virginia and the sixth-most populous city in the state. It is a principal city of the Hagerstown–Martinsburg metropolitan area extending into Maryland, which had 293,844 residents in 2020.

== History ==
Martinsburg was established by an act of the Virginia General Assembly that was adopted in December 1778 during the American Revolutionary War. Founder Major General Adam Stephen named the gateway town to the Shenandoah Valley along Tuscarora Creek in honor of Colonel Thomas Bryan Martin, a nephew of Thomas Fairfax, 6th Lord Fairfax of Cameron.

Aspen Hall, a Georgian mansion, is one of the oldest houses in the city. It was built in about 1776, by Edward Beeson II. Aspen Hall, and its wealthy residents had key roles in the agricultural, religious, transportation, and political history of the region. Significant events related to the French and Indian War, the Revolution, and the Civil War took place on the property. Three original buildings are still standing, including the rare blockhouse of Mendenhall's Fort.

One of the first United States post office in what is now West Virginia was established at Martinsburg in 1792. At that time, Martinsburg and the larger territory were still part of Virginia.

The Baltimore and Ohio Railroad (B&O) reached Martinsburg in 1842. The Baltimore and Ohio Railroad Martinsburg Shops were constructed in 1848 and rebuilt after the American Civil War.

According to William Still, "The Father of the Underground Railroad" and its historian: Mr Robert Brown, alias Thomas Jones, escaped from slavery in Martinsburg on Christmas night in 1856. He rode a horse and had it swim across the freezing Potomac River. After riding forty miles, he walked in cold wet clothes for two days, to Harrisburg, Pennsylvania. He received assistance there from the Underground Railroad and traveled by train to Philadelphia, and the office of William Still with the Pennsylvania Anti-Slavery Society. Brown's wife and four children had been sold; he sought help to find them. He had a likeness of his wife, and locks of hair from each of them.

=== Civil war ===
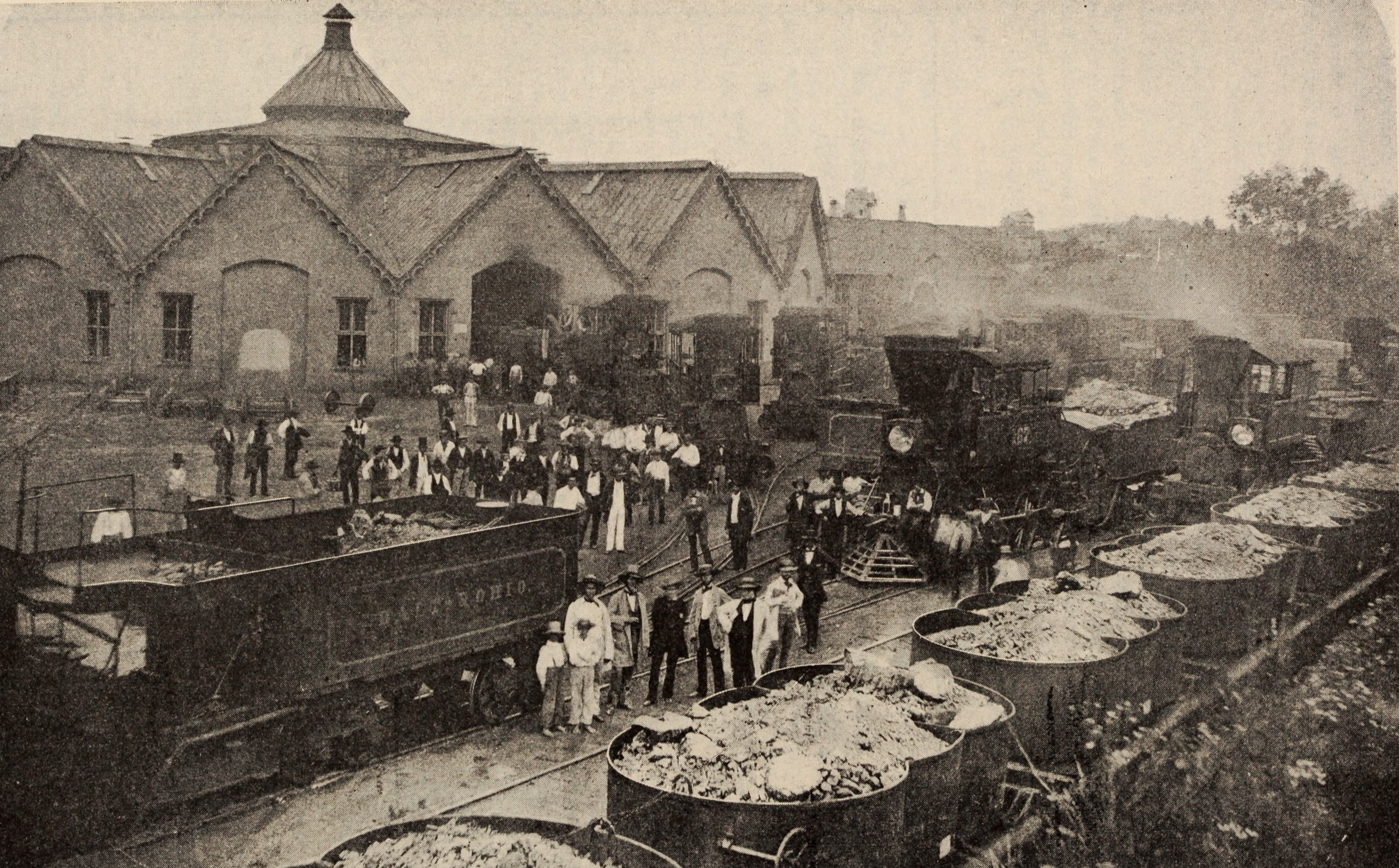
The Baltimore and Ohio Railroad's Martinsburg Shops three years before the Civil War

In 1853, Isabelle Boyd, known as "Belle" and later a noted spy for the Confederacy, moved to Martinsburg with her family, where her father Benjamin operated a general merchandise store. After the Civil War began, Benjamin joined the Second Virginia Infantry, which was part of the Stonewall Brigade. His wife Mary was thus in charge of the Boyd home when Union forces under General Robert Patterson took Martinsburg. When a group of Patterson's men tried to raise a Union flag over the Boyd home, Mary refused. One of the soldiers threatened Mary, and Belle shot him. She was acquitted.

She soon became involved in espionage, sending information to Confederate generals Thomas "Stonewall" Jackson and J.E.B. "Jeb" Stuart. Often she was helped by Eliza Corsey, a Boyd family slave whom Belle had taught to read and write. In 1863, Belle was arrested in Martinsburg by the Union Army and imprisoned. Boyd's Greek Revival home, which he had built in 1853 and sold in 1855, had numerous owners over the decades. In 1992 it was purchased by the Berkeley County Historical Society. The historical society renovated the building and now operates it as the Berkeley County Museum. It is also known as the Belle Boyd House.

=== Reconstruction ===
Residents of West Virginia were split in their allegiance during the war, with half of its soldiers serving in the Confederate army. The vote to create a new state in western Virginia was very low, but statehood was approved by Congress and President Lincoln, and the new state was admitted to the Union on June 20, 1863.

The city of Martinsburg was incorporated by an act of the new West Virginia Legislature on March 30, 1868.

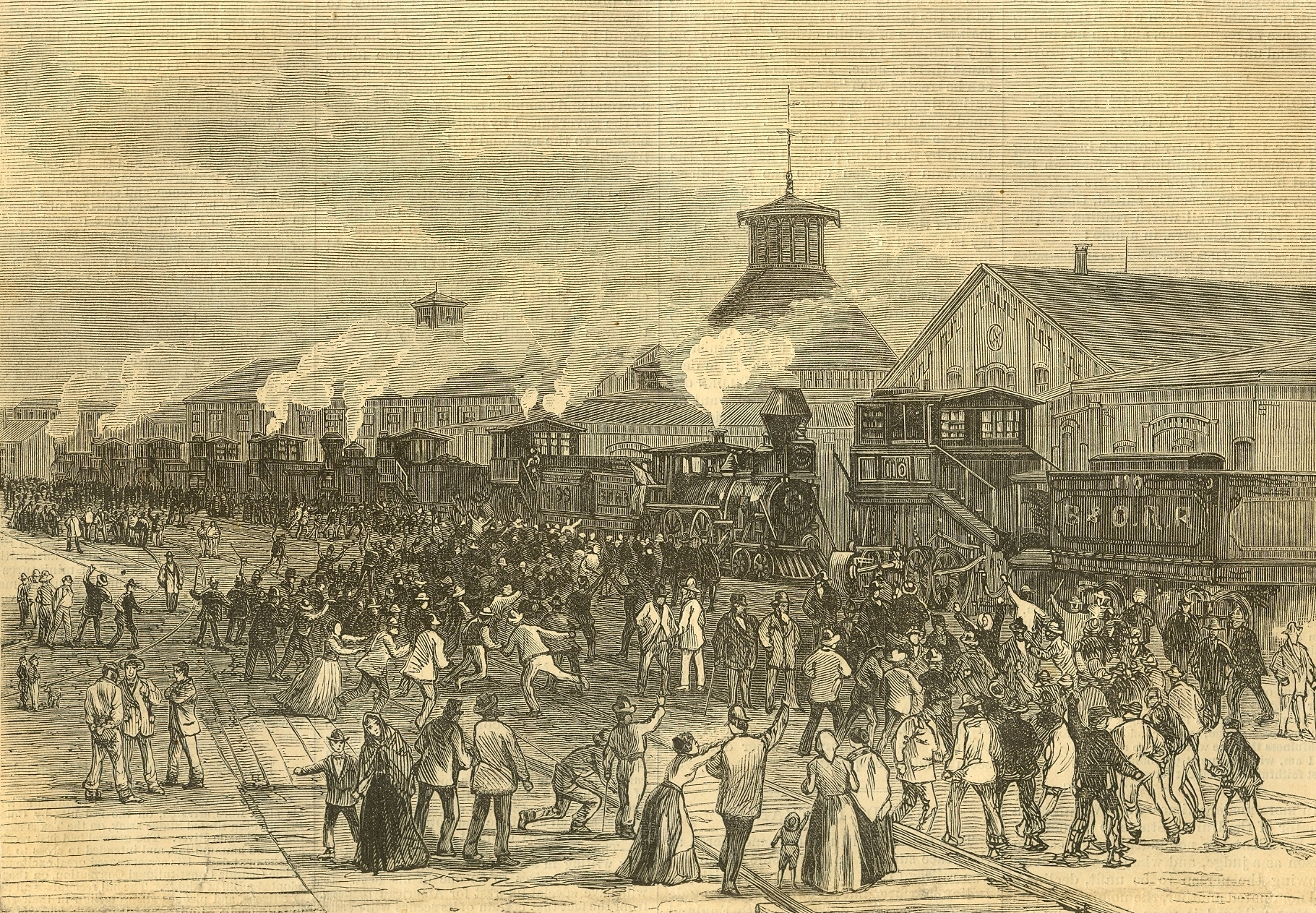
Blockade of engines during the Great Railroad Strike of 1877

Martinsburg became a center of the railroad industry and its workers. The Great Railroad Strike of 1877 began July 14, 1877, in this city at the Baltimore and Ohio Railroad Martinsburg Shops. After several unsuccessful attempts to quell the protests, Governor Henry M. Mathews called for federal troops. By the time these troops had restored order, the protest of the rail company had spread across the country.

Telephone service was established in Martinsburg in 1886.

In 1890, the Martinsburg Mining, Manufacturing, and Improvement Company was founded, who bought up land on the south side of Martinsburg to sell into lots. The area developed into residential and industrial, which contained Martinsburg's textile mills including the Interwoven Mills, which opened in 1891.

In January 1890, electricity began to be furnished in Martinsburg as part of a franchise granted to the United Edison Manufacturing Company of New York.

The Martinsburg Street Railway operated for two years between 1891-1893.

Construction of the Apollo Civic Theatre was completed in 1913.

=== World War I and beyond ===
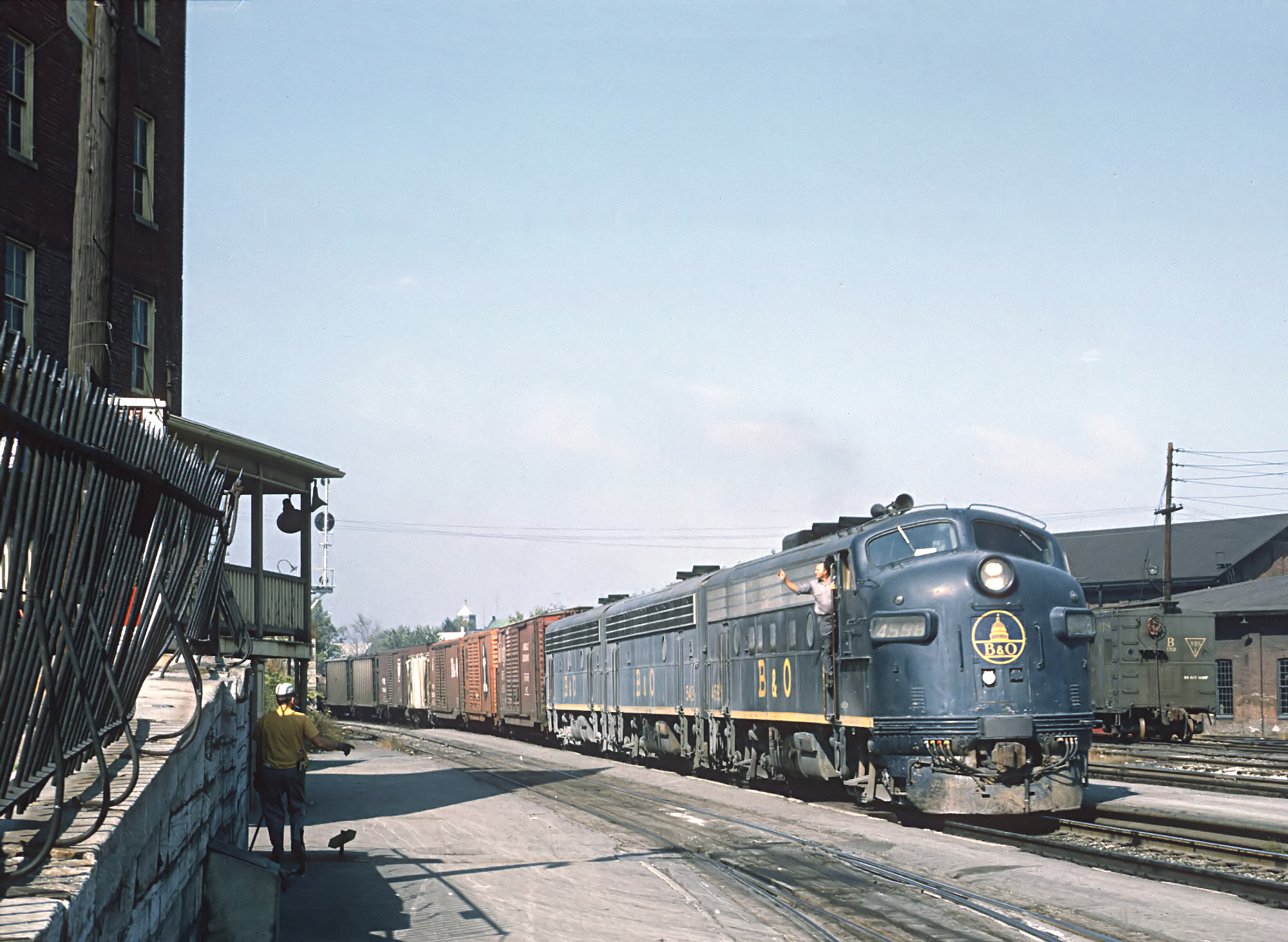
An engineer waves from a passing B&O freight train in 1969. The B&O's shops employed many locals throughout its 130 years of operation.

Over one thousand (1,039) men from Berkeley County participated in World War I. Of these, forty-one were killed, and twenty-one were wounded in battle. A monument to those who fell in battle was erected in Martinsburg in 1925.

During World War II, the Newton D. Baker Hospital in Martinsburg treated soldiers wounded in the war. In 1946 this military hospital became a part of the Veterans Administration (VA). The VA Medical Center in Martinsburg still provides care to United States veterans.

Due to restructuring beginning in the late 1940s and continuing through the 1960s, many of the mills and factories operating in Martinsburg shut down and went out of business, dealing a major blow to the local economy. These jobs moved to the Deep South and later offshore. In their place, new businesses moved to Martinsburg during the years after World War II, providing growth to the city.

== Geography ==
=== Location and topography ===
Martinsburg is approximately 18 miles (29 km) southwest of Hagerstown, 73 miles (117 km) west of Baltimore, 63 miles (101 km) northwest of Washington, D.C., and 134 miles (216 km) east of Morgantown. U.S. Route 11 runs through the center of town, and Interstate 81 passes along the northern side of the town.

Martinsburg is 212 miles (341 km) distant from the state capital of Charleston. However, it is closer to no less than five other state capitals: Harrisburg PA - 80 miles (130 km), Annapolis MD - 85 miles (137 km), Dover DE - 132 miles (212 km), Richmond VA - 135 miles (217 km), and Trenton NJ - 179 miles (288 km).

According to the United States Census Bureau, the city has a total area of 6.67 square miles (17.28 km^{2}), of which 6.65 square miles (17.22 km^{2}) is land and 0.02 square miles (0.05 km^{2}) is water.

=== Climate ===
Martinsburg lies in the transitional area between humid subtropical climate (Köppen Cfa) and humid continental climatic zones (Köppen Dfa), with four distinct seasons. Winters are cool to cold, with a January daily mean temperature of 32.4 °F (0.2 °C) and an average annual snowfall of 26.1 inches (66 cm), while summers are hot and humid with a July daily mean temperature of 75.7 °F (24.3 °C) and 27 days of 90 °F (32 °C)+ readings annually. Precipitation is moderate, with winter being the driest period and May thru July the wettest. Extreme temperatures at Eastern West Virginia Regional Airport range from −18 °F (−28 °C) on January 21, 1994, up to 112 °F (44 °C) on July 11, 1936; an even colder −19 °F (−28 °C) was recorded in the city on January 14, 1912.

Climate data for Martinsburg, West Virginia (Eastern West Virginia Regional Airport), 1991−2020 normals, (Note: Mean monthly maxima and minima (i.e. the expected highest and lowest temperature readings at any point during the year or given month) calculated based on data at said location from 1991 to 2020.) extremes 1891−present (Note: Records have been kept at Eastern WV Regional Airport since 1926.)
Month	Jan	Feb	Mar	Apr	May	Jun	Jul	Aug	Sep	Oct	Nov	Dec	Year
Record high °F (°C)	80 (27)	83 (28)	90 (32)	101 (38)	100 (38)	110 (43)	112 (44)	108 (42)	103 (39)	98 (37)	86 (30)	78 (26)	112 (44)
Mean maximum °F (°C)	64.0 (17.8)	65.9 (18.8)	76.0 (24.4)	85.1 (29.5)	89.7 (32.1)	93.8 (34.3)	96.6 (35.9)	94.3 (34.6)	90.6 (32.6)	83.6 (28.7)	73.7 (23.2)	64.7 (18.2)	97.4 (36.3)
Mean daily maximum °F (°C)	41.3 (5.2)	44.7 (7.1)	53.5 (11.9)	65.4 (18.6)	74.0 (23.3)	82.4 (28.0)	86.9 (30.5)	85.0 (29.4)	78.1 (25.6)	66.7 (19.3)	55.1 (12.8)	44.8 (7.1)	64.8 (18.2)
Daily mean °F (°C)	32.4 (0.2)	35.0 (1.7)	42.8 (6.0)	53.6 (12.0)	62.5 (16.9)	71.1 (21.7)	75.7 (24.3)	73.8 (23.2)	66.7 (19.3)	55.2 (12.9)	44.6 (7.0)	36.0 (2.2)	54.1 (12.3)
Mean daily minimum °F (°C)	23.5 (−4.7)	25.3 (−3.7)	32.2 (0.1)	41.8 (5.4)	51.0 (10.6)	59.8 (15.4)	64.5 (18.1)	62.5 (16.9)	55.3 (12.9)	43.7 (6.5)	34.2 (1.2)	27.1 (−2.7)	43.4 (6.3)
Mean minimum °F (°C)	4.3 (−15.4)	9.5 (−12.5)	15.5 (−9.2)	27.2 (−2.7)	36.6 (2.6)	46.7 (8.2)	53.7 (12.1)	52.2 (11.2)	41.3 (5.2)	29.2 (−1.6)	19.3 (−7.1)	12.0 (−11.1)	2.1 (−16.6)
Record low °F (°C)	−19 (−28)	−13 (−25)	−3 (−19)	19 (−7)	26 (−3)	36 (2)	41 (5)	38 (3)	29 (−2)	17 (−8)	6 (−14)	−12 (−24)	−19 (−28)
Average precipitation inches (mm)	2.60 (66)	2.14 (54)	3.42 (87)	3.36 (85)	4.05 (103)	3.85 (98)	3.78 (96)	3.02 (77)	4.03 (102)	2.99 (76)	2.73 (69)	3.00 (76)	38.97 (990)
Average snowfall inches (cm)	9.0 (23)	7.2 (18)	4.6 (12)	0.4 (1.0)	0.0 (0.0)	0.0 (0.0)	0.0 (0.0)	0.0 (0.0)	0.0 (0.0)	0.0 (0.0)	1.1 (2.8)	3.8 (9.7)	26.1 (66)
Average precipitation days (≥ 0.01 in)	10.0	8.9	11.0	11.0	13.0	11.3	10.6	9.1	9.4	9.0	8.5	9.5	121.3
Average snowy days (≥ 0.1 in)	3.7	2.1	1.7	0.2	0.0	0.0	0.0	0.0	0.0	0.0	0.5	2.1	10.3
Source: NOAA (snow 1981–2010)

== Demographics ==
Historical population
Census	Pop.	Note	%±
1850	2,190		—
1860	3,364		53.6%
1870	4,863		44.6%
1880	6,335		30.3%
1890	7,226		14.1%
1900	7,564		4.7%
1910	10,698		41.4%
1920	12,515		17.0%
1930	14,857		18.7%
1940	15,063		1.4%
1950	15,621		3.7%
1960	15,179		−2.8%
1970	14,626		−3.6%
1980	13,063		−10.7%
1990	14,073		7.7%
2000	14,972		6.4%
2010	17,227		15.1%
2020	18,777		9.0%
U.S. Decennial Census

=== 2020 census ===
As of the 2020 census, Martinsburg had a population of 18,777 and a population density of 2,591.7 inhabitants per square mile.

The median age was 38.3 years. 22.4% of residents were under the age of 18 and 16.4% of residents were 65 years of age or older. For every 100 females there were 94.4 males, and for every 100 females age 18 and over there were 92.8 males age 18 and over.

98.8% of residents lived in urban areas, while 1.2% lived in rural areas.

There were 8,003 households in the city, of which 27.9% had children under the age of 18 living in them. Of all households, 30.9% were married-couple households, 24.7% were households with a male householder and no spouse or partner present, and 33.5% were households with a female householder and no spouse or partner present. About 37.6% of all households were made up of individuals and 15.1% had someone living alone who was 65 years of age or older.

There were 8,860 housing units, of which 9.7% were vacant. The homeowner vacancy rate was 2.0% and the rental vacancy rate was 8.2%.

The median household income (in 2019 dollars) was $42,835, and the per capita income was $24,970; 29.5% of residents were below the poverty line. 88.5% of households had a computer, and 77.9% had broadband internet access.

Racial composition as of the 2020 census
Race	Number	Percent
White	13,054	69.5%
Black or African American	2,928	15.6%
American Indian and Alaska Native	91	0.5%
Asian	325	1.7%
Native Hawaiian and Other Pacific Islander	9	0.0%
Some other race	561	3.0%
Two or more races	1,809	9.6%
Hispanic or Latino (of any race)	1,401	7.5%

=== 2010 census ===
As of the census of 2010, there were 17,227 people, 7,293 households, and 4,106 families residing in the city. The population density was 2,590.5 inhabitants per square mile (1,000.2/km^{2}). There were 8,408 housing units at an average density of 1,264.4 per square mile (488.2/km^{2}). The racial makeup of the city was 77.5% White, 14.9% African American, 0.4% Native American, 1.2% Asian, 0.1% Pacific Islander, 2.3% from other races, and 3.7% from two or more races. Hispanic or Latino of any race were 6.2% of the population.

There were 7,293 households, of which 29.6% had children under the age of 18 living with them, 35.3% were married couples living together, 15.0% had a female householder with no husband present, 6.0% had a male householder with no wife present, and 43.7% were non-families. Of all households, 35.4% were made up of individuals, and 12.6% had someone living alone who was 65 years of age or older. The average household size was 2.32 and the average family size was 3.00.

The median age in the city was 37 years. 23.3% of residents were under the age of 18; 8.6% were between the ages of 18 and 24; 28.3% were from 25 to 44; 26.3% were from 45 to 64; and 13.4% were 65 years of age or older. The gender makeup of the city was 48.8% male and 51.2% female.

=== 2000 census ===
As of the census of 2000, there were 14,972 people, 6,684 households, and 3,689 families residing in the city. The population density was 2,977.4 inhabitants per square mile (1,149.6/km^{2}). There were 7,432 housing units at an average density of 1,478.0 per square mile (570.7/km^{2}). The racial makeup of the city was 83.9% White, 11.6% African American, 0.4% Native American, 0.9% Asian, 0% Pacific Islander, 1.3%% from other races, and 2.2% from two or more races. Hispanic or Latino of any race were 2.9% of the population.

There were 6,684 households, out of which 24.9% had children under the age of 18 living with them, 36.7% were married couples living together, 13.7% had a female householder with no husband present, and 44.8% were non-families. 37.6% of all households were made up of individuals, and 15.2% had someone living alone who was 65 years of age or older. The average household size was 2.21 and the average family size was 2.92.

In the city, the population was spread out, with 23.1% under the age of 18, 9.6% from 18 to 24, 28.7% from 25 to 44, 22.3% from 45 to 64, and 16.4% who were 65 years of age or older. The median age was 37 years. For every 100 females, there were 91.0 males. For every 100 females age 18 and over, there were 88.6 males.

The median income for a household in the city was $29,495, and the median income for a family was $36,954. Males had a median income of $29,697 versus $22,212 for females. The per capita income for the city was $16,314. About 14.7% of families and 20.0% of the population were below the poverty line, including 28.8% of those under age 18 and 15.1% of those age 65 or over.

== Economy ==
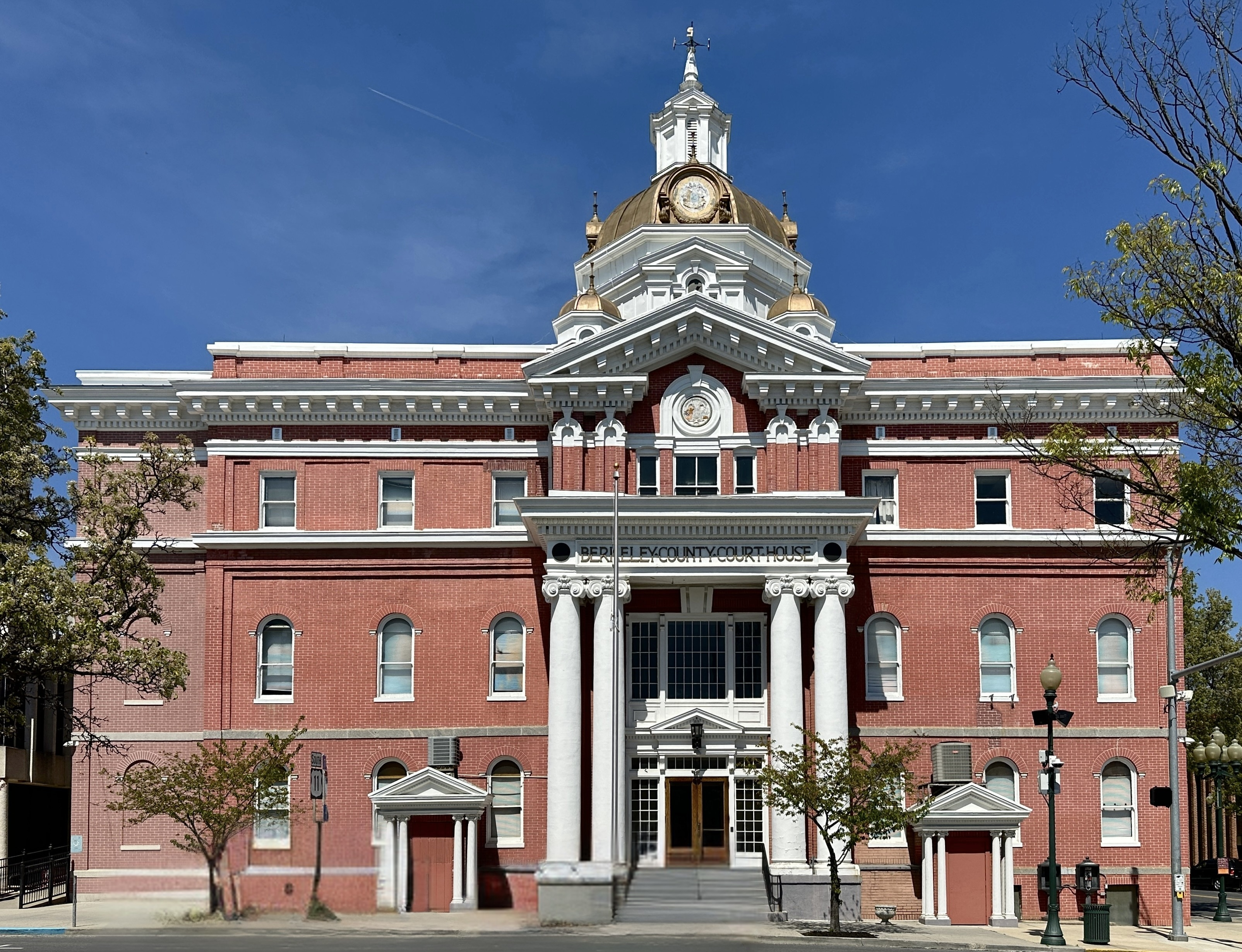
Former Berkeley County Courthouse in 2026

Major private employers in and around Martinsburg include Quad/Graphics, Ecolab, Orgill, Macy's, and FedEx. In February 2015, it was announced that Procter & Gamble planned to build a $500 million facility near the city.

The city also has numerous federal government employers, including the Internal Revenue Service (IRS), U.S. Coast Guard C5ISC-Kearneysville, U.S. Coast Guard National Maritime Center, Bureau of Alcohol, Tobacco, Firearms, and Explosives, and the Martinsburg VA Medical Center.

The Martinsburg IRS Facility, one of the two Enterprise Computing Centers of the Internal Revenue Service (the other is in Memphis, Tennessee), processes most of the country's electronically filed tax documents from businesses, and about one-third of electronically filed tax returns.

Martinsburg had its own automobile company from 1912 to 1922, called Norwalk, which assembled the longest-made known cars to be built in the state of West Virginia.

Martinsburg Mall was an 670,000 square feet (62,000 m^{2}) enclosed shopping mall situated along Interstate 81. It opened in 1991 and the mall became a regional and retail hub for the area. The property was renamed to Foxcroft Town Center and it closed in 2016 for a redevelopment into an open-air shopping center.

== Sports ==
Major League Baseball Hall of Famer Hack Wilson began his storied professional career in his adopted hometown with the Martinsburg Blue Sox, a low-level minor-league baseball team. Wilson would go on to set the yet-to-be-broken major league record for RBI in a season (191) with the Chicago Cubs in 1930.

After his playing career ended in 1935, Hack went back home to Martinsburg, played some ball with the town's semipro team and opened a recreation and pool hall in town with a partner. He later moved to Baltimore in 1941 where he later died November 23, 1948. Originally scheduled to be interred in Baltimore, Wilson was buried — in a donated plot — in Martinsburg,

== Education ==
=== Elementary and intermediate schools ===
- Rocky Knoll Adventist School
- Bedington Elementary
- Berkeley Heights Elementary
- Burke Street Elementary
- Opequon Elementary
- Rosemont Elementary
- Spring Mills Elementary
- Tuscarora Elementary
- Winchester Avenue Elementary
- Potomack Intermediate
- Orchard View Intermediate
- Eagle School Intermediate
- St. Joseph Catholic School

=== Middle schools ===
- North Middle
- South Middle
- Spring Mills Middle

=== High schools ===
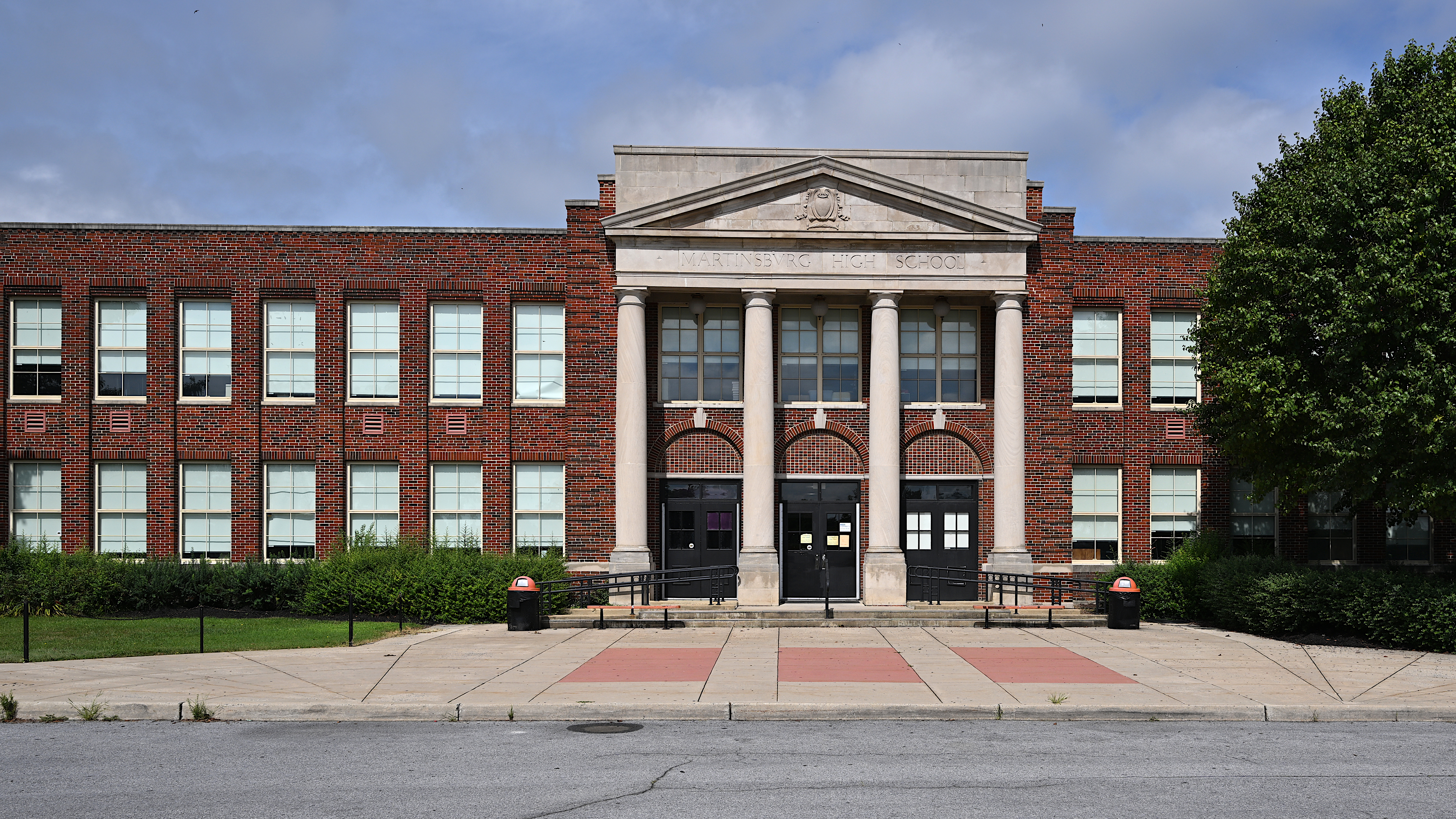
Martinsburg High School

- Martinsburg High School
- Spring Mills High School

=== Colleges and universities ===
- Blue Ridge Community and Technical College, Martinsburg
- James Rumsey Technical Institute, Martinsburg
- Valley College of Technology, Martinsburg Campus

== Media ==
=== Print ===
Martinsburg has one daily community newspaper, The Journal and also is regionally covered by The Herald-Mail out of Hagerstown, Maryland. Martinsburg has a bi-monthly magazine, Around the Panhandle magazine.

=== Radio ===
The city is home to WEPM/1340 AM, WRNR/740 AM, WICL/95.9 FM, WLTF/97.5 FM, and WVEP/88.9 FM radio stations.

=== Television ===
Martinsburg is home to W08EE-D Channel 8 (West Virginia Public Broadcasting) and WWPX 60 (ION), all part of the Hagerstown sub-market that is further grouped under the Nielsen-designated Washington, D.C.-Hagerstown, Md. market, the ninth largest market in the nation.

Martinsburg was the setting of the X-Files episode "Small Potatoes" (Season 4, episode 20). However, the filming did not take place in the vicinity. Martinsburg was also the setting for the reality television series Gypsy Sisters on TLC.

== Transportation ==
=== Roads and highways ===
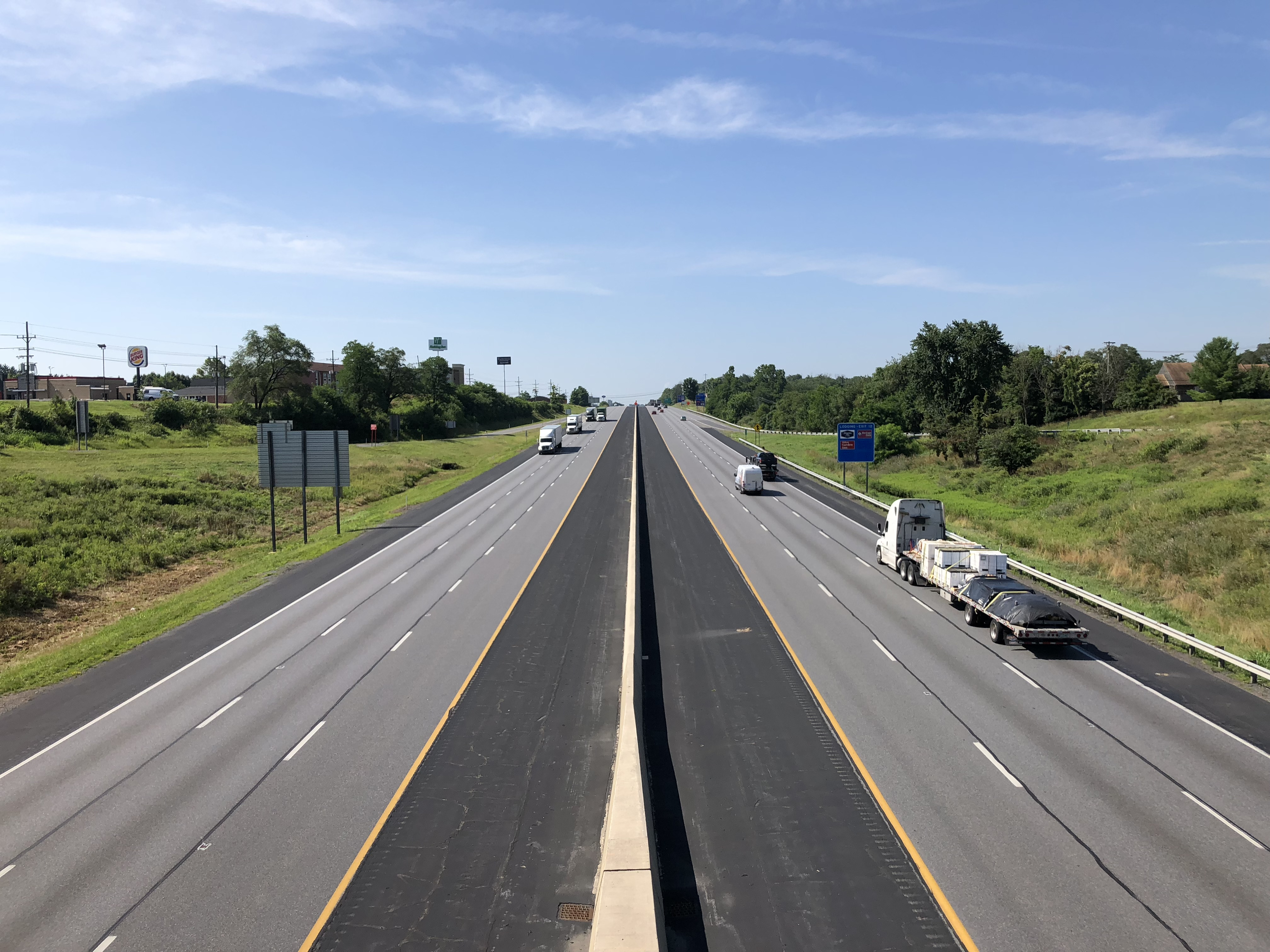
I-81 southbound in Martinsburg

Martinsburg is served by several significant highways. The most prominent of these is Interstate 81, which is the main north–south highway through the region. I-81 connects northward to Hagerstown and Harrisburg, and continues southward to Winchester and Roanoke. U.S. Route 11, the former primary regional north–south highway, now serves as a local service road to I-81, and travels through downtown Martinsburg. The main highway serving regional east–west travel is West Virginia Route 9. From Martinsburg eastwards, WV 9 follows an expressway, connecting the city to Charles Town and Leesburg. WV 9 follows US 11 through downtown Martinsburg. To the west, WV 9 continues to Berkeley Springs and Paw Paw. West Virginia Route 45 is the other state highway serving Martinsburg. WV 45 extends westward into rural areas of western Berkeley County, and continues eastward to Shepherdstown.

=== Mass transportation ===
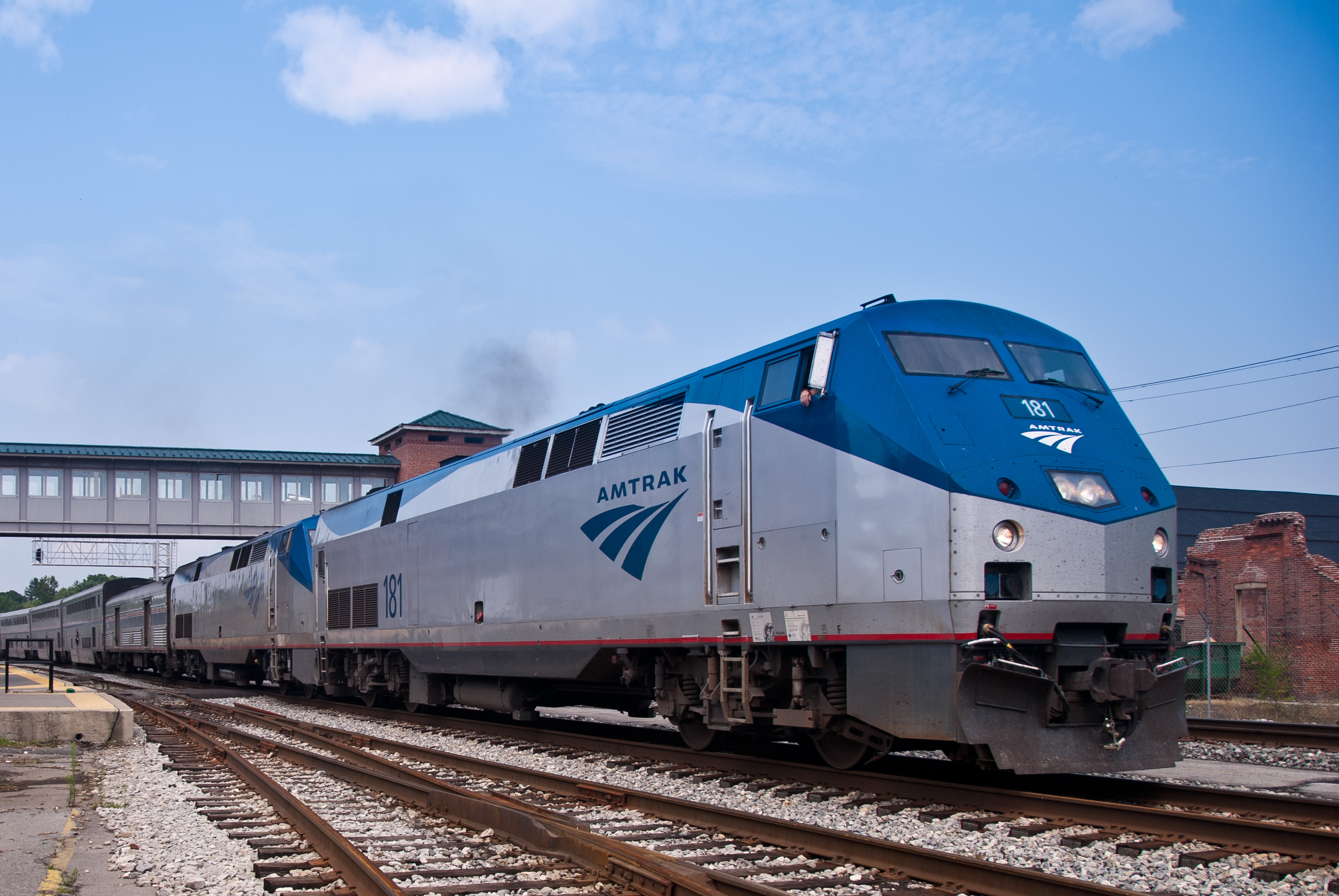
Amtrak train at Martinsburg station

Amtrak provides service to Martinsburg on its Washington-Chicago Capitol Limited route (now served by the Floridian). The city's passenger rail station is located downtown at 229 East Martin Street. MARC, Maryland's commuter rail system, operates trains on weekdays on its Brunswick Line which terminates in Martinsburg. Service is provided to Washington Union Station in Washington, D.C.

Eastern Panhandle Transit Authority (EPTA) operates public bus transit routes in Martinsburg, surrounding Berkeley County, and neighboring Jefferson County, West Virginia. A transit center is being built in Martinsburg.

=== Aviation ===
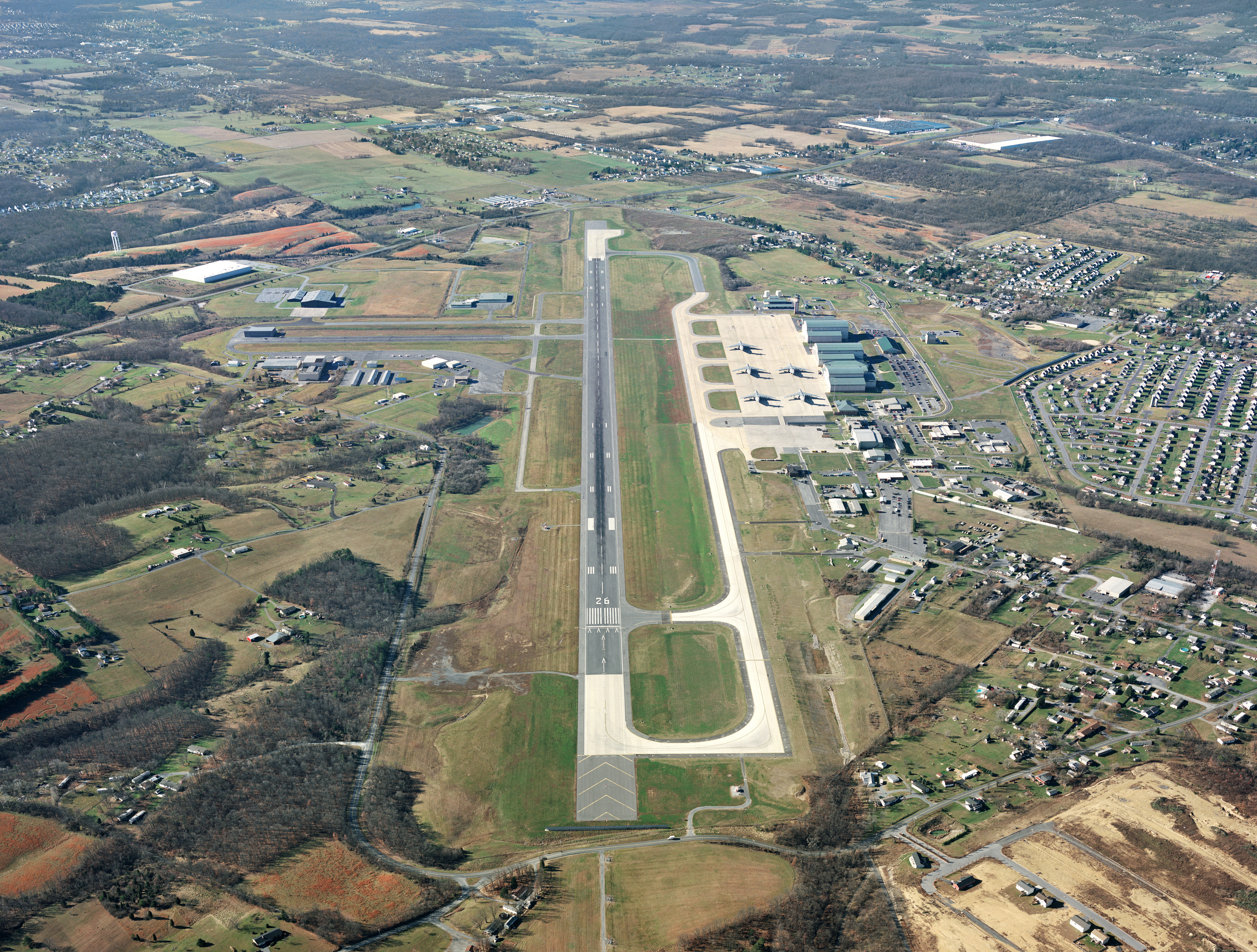
Eastern WV Regional Airport

Eastern WV Regional Airport, south of the city, handles general aviation. The Shepherd Field Air National Guard Base, the home base for 167th Airlift Wing of the West Virginia Air National Guard, is located here. The closest airport with commercial air service is Hagerstown Regional Airport, that is about 25 miles (40 km) driving distance north. The closest international airport is Washington Dulles International Airport near D.C., which is about 60 miles (97 km) driving distance east.

== Healthcare ==
Martinsburg is home to two hospitals, namely the Berkeley Medical Center and the Martinsburg Veterans Affairs Medical Center.
