= Pittsburgh Pirates Radio Network =

Stations carrying Pittsburgh Pirates baseball games

The Pittsburgh Pirates, the Major League Baseball franchise in Pittsburgh are carried on radio stations throughout four states including Pennsylvania, Ohio, West Virginia and Maryland. In 2012, KDKA-FM in Pittsburgh became the flagship station, replacing WPGB-FM., KDKA (AM) also simulcasts all weekday afternoon games as well as select other broadcasts, and serves as the backup station when 93.7 airs Pittsburgh Panthers football.

Greg Brown and Joe Block do play by play. They are joined by a rotating cast of color commentators: John Wehner, Bob Walk, Neil Walker, Kevin Young, and Matt Capps.

== Affiliate stations ==
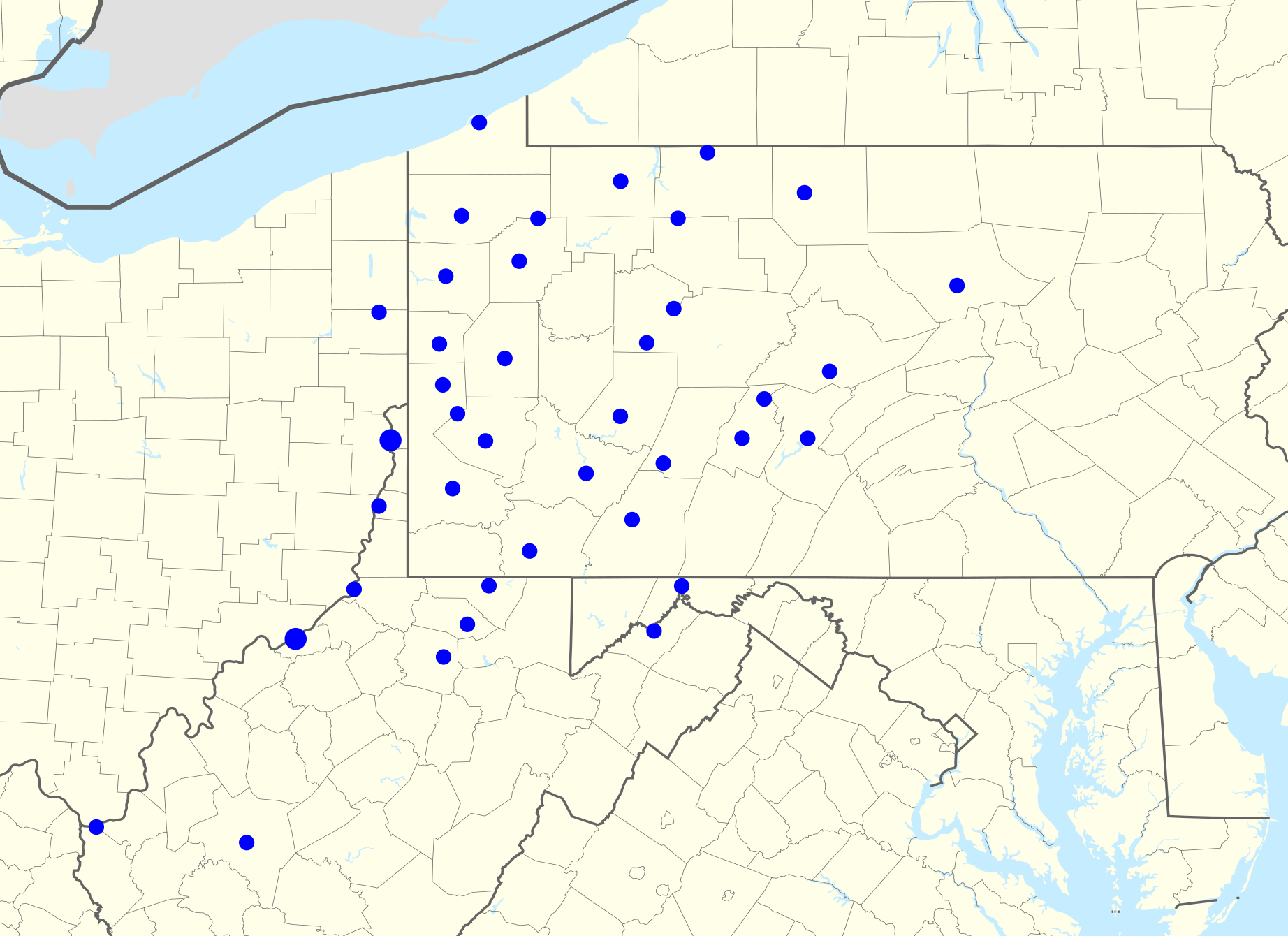
Map of affiliates

== Station list ==
| Callsign | Frequency | Band | City | State | Network status |
|---|---|---|---|---|---|
| KDKA-FM | 93.7 | FM | Pittsburgh | Pennsylvania | Flagship |
| KDKA | 1020 | AM | Pittsburgh | Pennsylvania | Flagship |
| WTNA | 1430 | AM | Altoona | Pennsylvania | Affiliate |
| W259DG | 99.7 | FM | Altoona | Pennsylvania | n/a (WTNA simulcast) |
| WMBA | 1460 | AM | Ambridge | Pennsylvania | Affiliate |
| W239CR | 95.7 | FM | Ambridge | Pennsylvania | n/a (WMBA simulcast) |
| WBVP | 1230 | AM | Beaver Falls | Pennsylvania | Affiliate |
| W257EA | 99.3 | FM | Beaver Falls | Pennsylvania | n/a (WBVP simulcast) |
| WESB | 1490 | AM | Bradford | Pennsylvania | Affiliate |
| W298CM | 107.5 | FM | Bradford | Pennsylvania | n/a (WESB simulcast) |
| WISR | 680 | AM | Butler | Pennsylvania | Affiliate |
| W298CW | 107.5 | FM | Butler | Pennsylvania | n/a (WISR simulcast) |
| WKAZ | 680 | AM | Charleston | West Virginia | Affiliate |
| W235BX | 94.9 | FM | Colliers | West Virginia | n/a (WEIR simulcast) |
| WFRM | 600 | AM | Coudersport | Pennsylvania | Affiliate |
| W243EB | 96.5 | FM | Coudersport | Pennsylvania | n/a (WFRM simulcast) |
| WCBC | 1270 | AM | Cumberland | Maryland | Affiliate |
| W276DQ | 103.1 | FM | Cumberland | Maryland | n/a (WCBC simulcast) |
| WCED | 1420 | AM | DuBois | Pennsylvania | Affiliate |
| W259DC | 99.7 | FM | DuBois | Pennsylvania | n/a (WCED simulcast) |
| W300BR | 107.9 | FM | DuBois | Pennsylvania | n/a (WCED simulcast) |
| WJET | 1400 | AM | Erie | Pennsylvania | Affiliate |
| W244DX | 96.7 | FM | Erie | Pennsylvania | n/a (WJET simulcast) |
| WRLF | 1490 | AM | Fairmont | West Virginia | Affiliate |
| W252EF | 98.3 | FM | Fairmont | West Virginia | n/a (WRLF simulcast) |
| WFRA | 1450 | AM | Franklin | Pennsylvania | Affiliate |
| W251CL | 98.1 | FM | Franklin | Pennsylvania | n/a (WFRA simulcast) |
| WRVC | 930 | AM | Huntington | West Virginia | Affiliate |
| W231BS | 94.1 | FM | Huntington | West Virginia | n/a (WRVC simulcast) |
| WCCS | 1160 | AM | Indiana | Pennsylvania | Affiliate |
| W266CZ | 101.1 | FM | Indiana | Pennsylvania | n/a (WCCS simulcast) |
| WEJS | 1600 | AM | Jersey Shore | Pennsylvania | Affiliate |
| W281CI | 104.1 | FM | Jersey Shore | Pennsylvania | n/a (WEJS simulcast) |
| WNTJ | 1490 | AM | Johnstown | Pennsylvania | Affiliate |
| W283CX | 104.5 | FM | Johnstown | Pennsylvania | n/a (WNTJ simulcast) |
| WKLP | 1390 | AM | Keyser | West Virginia | Affiliate |
| WJFG | 1480 | AM | Latrobe | Pennsylvania | Affiliate |
| W298DH | 107.5 | FM | Latrobe | Pennsylvania | n/a (WJFG simulcast) |
| W224AI | 92.7 | FM | Loyalsock Township | Pennsylvania | n/a (WLYC simulcast) |
| WMGW | 1490 | AM | Meadville | Pennsylvania | Affiliate |
| W264DK | 100.7 | FM | Meadville | Pennsylvania | n/a (WMGW simulcast) |
| WLLF | 96.7 | FM | Mercer | Pennsylvania | Affiliate |
| WAJR | 1440 | AM | Morgantown | West Virginia | Affiliate |
| W283CR | 104.5 | FM | Morgantown | West Virginia | n/a (WAJR simulcast) |
| WUZZ | 1280 | AM | New Castle | Pennsylvania | Affiliate |
| W248DJ | 97.5 | FM | New Castle | Pennsylvania | n/a (WUZZ simulcast) |
| WETZ | 1330 | AM | New Martinsville | West Virginia | Affiliate |
| W226BE | 93.1 | FM | New Martinsville | West Virginia | n/a (WETZ simulcast) |
| W283DH | 104.5 | FM | New Martinsville | West Virginia | n/a (WETZ simulcast) |
| WPXZ | 104.1 | FM | Punxsutawney | Pennsylvania | Affiliate |
| WDDH | 97.5 | FM | Ridgway | Pennsylvania | Affiliate |
| W244CH | 96.7 | FM | Rockton | Pennsylvania | n/a (WCED simulcast) |
| WGGI | 990 | AM | Somerset | Pennsylvania | Affiliate |
| W278CR | 103.5 | FM | Somerset | Pennsylvania | n/a (WGGI simulcast) |
| WJAW | 630 | AM | St. Marys | West Virginia | Affiliate |
| W225CW | 92.9 | FM | St. Marys | West Virginia | n/a (WJAW simulcast) |
| WLEJ | 1450 | AM | State College | Pennsylvania | Affiliate |
| W279DK | 103.7 | FM | State College | Pennsylvania | n/a (WLEJ simulcast) |
| WCDK | 106.3 | FM | Steubenville | Ohio | Affiliate |
| WTIV | 1230 | AM | Titusville | Pennsylvania | Affiliate |
| W287DC | 105.3 | FM | Titusville | Pennsylvania | n/a (WTIV simulcast) |
| WTRN | 1340 | AM | Tyrone | Pennsylvania | Affiliate |
| W264BZ | 100.7 | FM | Tyrone | Pennsylvania | n/a (WTRN simulcast) |
| WMBS | 590 | AM | Uniontown | Pennsylvania | Affiliate |
| W266DB | 101.1 | FM | Uniontown | Pennsylvania | n/a (WMBS simulcast) |
| WICU | 1310 | AM | Warren | Pennsylvania | Affiliate |
| W244DY | 96.7 | FM | Warren | Pennsylvania | n/a (WICU simulcast) |
| WJPA | 1450 | AM | Washington | Pennsylvania | Affiliate |
| WEIR | 1430 | AM | Weirton | West Virginia | Affiliate |
| W271CZ | 102.1 | FM | Weirton | West Virginia | n/a (WEIR simulcast) |
| WBBD | 1400 | AM | Wheeling | West Virginia | Affiliate |
| W280EW | 103.9 | FM | Wheeling | West Virginia | n/a (WBBD simulcast) |
| WLYC | 1050 | AM | Williamsport | Pennsylvania | Affiliate |
| WBBW | 1240 | AM | Youngstown | Ohio | Affiliate |
