= WOHI =

Partial Simulcast of WOMP-FM Bellaire, Ohio
- East Liverpool, Ohio; United States
- Broadcast area: East Liverpool, Ohio
- Frequency: 1490 kHz
- Branding: "WOHI Classic Hits" "100.5 WOMP-FM" during simulcasts with WOMP-FM.

Programming
- Format: Classic hits

Ownership
- Owner: Cody Barack; (Ohio Midland Newsgroup, LLC)
- Sister stations: WCDK, WLYV, WRQY, WBGI-FM, WEIR, WOMP-FM

History
- First air date: December 1, 1949
- Call sign meaning: Ohio

Technical information
- Licensing authority: FCC
- Facility ID: 13710
- Class: C
- Power: 1,000 watts unlimited
- Transmitter coordinates: 40°37′47.2″N 80°36′8.3″W
- Translator: 103.9 W280FL (East Liverpool)

Links
- Public license information: Public file; LMS
- Webcast: Listen Live
- Website: rivernetworkradio.com

WOHI (1490 AM) is a radio station broadcasting a classic hits format. Licensed to East Liverpool, Ohio, United States, it serves the East Liverpool area. The station is currently owned by Cody Barack through licensee Ohio Midland Newsgroup, LLC.

WOHI (Woah-Hi) was joined by an FM station (WOHI-FM 104.3) years after it came on the air. Their former slogan was "Music of Your Life", with a nostalgia format.

Once Keymarket purchased the stations, they moved 104.3 to Moon Township, and gave it the WOGI call sign. It is now boasting their "Froggy" country format while 1490 WOHI is still in East Liverpool, did have the "Pickle" format. Before that, Keymarket had programmed a sports format from ESPN Radio on WOHI.

On April 8, 2025 Forever Media announced it would be selling WOHI-AM and two FM translators to Cody Barack Ohio Midland Newsgroup, LLC. On June 9, 2025 the FCC approved the sale and on June 26, 2025 the deal was Consummation. On that date the station started to simulcast WOMP-FM out of Bellaire, OH. Sometime in the middle of July 2025, WOHI-AM went to be programmed separately from WOMP-FM. Expect for WOMP-FM weekday morning and Open House Party.

<ref name="PBRTV">

- We reported it back in April, but now Forever Media has completed the sale of WOHI (1490) East Liverpool to Ohio Midland Newsgroup, LLC. The sale included 1490’s FM translator W280FL (103.9 East Liverpool. Right now they’re simulcasting WOMP (100.5 Bellaire). Thanks to alert Ohio Valley reader Jason R. for the discovery!

</ref>
