= WBGI =

WBGI may refer to:

- Long Seridan Airport, Malaysia (ICAO code: WBGI)
- WBGI (AM), a defunct radio station in Pennsylvania, United States
- WBGI-FM, a West-Virginia–licensed radio station (105.5 FM) serving the Wheeling, WV-OH metropolitan area, U.S.
- WOMP (FM) (formerly WBGI-FM), an Ohio-licensed station (100.5 FM) also serving the Wheeling metropolitan area, U.S.
