= WYJK =

WYJK may refer to:

- WRQY, a radio station (96.5 FM) licensed to serve Moundsville, West Virginia, United States, which held the call sign WYJK-FM from 2012 to 2014
- WOMP (FM), a radio station (100.5 FM) licensed to serve Bellaire, Ohio, United States, which held the call sign WYJK-FM from 2005 to 2012
- WBGI (AM), a radio station (1340 AM) licensed to serve Connellsville, Pennsylvania, United States, which held the call sign WYJK from 2005 to 2011
