= WUKL =

WUKL may refer to:

- WUKL (FM), a radio station (106.9 FM) licensed to serve Masontown, Pennsylvania, United States
- WOMP (FM), a radio station (100.5 FM) licensed to serve Bellaire, Ohio, United States, which held the call sign WUKL from 2021 to 2023
- WBGI-FM, a radio station (105.5 FM) licensed to serve Bethlehem, West Virginia, United States, which held the call sign WUKL from 2004 to 2021
