= WJAW =

WJAW may refer to:

- WJAW (AM), a radio station (630 AM) licensed to St. Mary's, West Virginia, United States
- WJAW-FM, a radio station (100.9 FM) licensed to McConnelsville, Ohio, United States
