= WOMP =

WOMP may mean:

- WOMP (FM), a radio station (100.5 FM) licensed to serve Bellaire, Ohio, United States
- WOMP-LP, a radio station (101.9 FM) licensed to serve Cambridge, Ohio; see List of radio stations in Ohio
- WLYV, a radio station (1290 AM) licensed to serve Bellaire, Ohio, which held the call sign WOMP from 1959 to 2017
