= WOVK =

- Wheeling, West Virginia; United States
- Broadcast area: Wheeling metro area
- Frequency: 98.7 MHz
- Branding: 98.7 WOVK

Programming
- Language: English
- Format: Country music
- Affiliations: Premiere Networks

Ownership
- Owner: iHeartMedia, Inc.; (iHM Licenses, LLC)
- Sister stations: WBBD; WEGW; WKWK-FM; WVKF; WWVA

History
- First air date: September 1, 1947; 79 years ago
- Former call signs: WWVA-FM (1947–1977); WCPI (1977–1984)
- Call sign meaning: Ohio Valley K(C)ountry

Technical information
- Licensing authority: FCC
- Facility ID: 44048
- Class: B
- ERP: 50,000 watts
- HAAT: 119 meters (390 ft)
- Transmitter coordinates: 40°04′58″N 80°46′18″W

Links
- Public license information: Public file; LMS
- Webcast: Listen live (via iHeartRadio)
- Website: wovk.iheart.com

WOVK (98.7 FM) is a radio station broadcasting a country format. Licensed to Wheeling, West Virginia, United States, it serves the Wheeling area. The station is owned by iHeartMedia, Inc.

WOVK is one of the Local Primary 1 Emergency Alert System stations in the Wheeling area.

== History ==
The 98.7 MHz frequency in Wheeling was originally assigned to WWVA-FM, which began broadcasting September 1, 1947. It was licensed to West Virginia Broadcasting Corporation.

In the 1990s to the 2000s, the station boasted an impressive lineup of local on-air talent and programming. Former disc jockeys include Steve Crow, Otis, Ken "Big K" Andrews, "Coffee Boy," Chad Tyson, Jamie Lynn, Skip Kelly, Rich Biela, Traci Fulton, Don Anthony, Scott Fisher, David Demarest, Kari Brooks, Charlie Mitchell, Michael St. James, Corey Klug, and longtime Program Director & Music Director Jimmy Elliott. The station's former flagship morning program, Morning Madness, was consistently the #1-ranked morning program in the Ohio Valley from 1993 until its cancellation in November 2020.

WOVK also served as the official radio station of Jamboree in the Hills for many years until its cancellation in 2018, broadcasting live audio of the entire country music festival. The station was also heavily involved in the festival's successor, Blame My Roots Festival, although it did not broadcast live audio of the performing acts.
