= WDSN =

Coordinates: 41°08′41″N 78°52′41″W

- Reynoldsville, Pennsylvania; United States
- Broadcast area: DuBois, Pennsylvania
- Frequency: 106.5 MHz
- Branding: Sunny 106

Programming
- Format: Adult contemporary
- Affiliations: Compass Media Networks; Westwood One; Pittsburgh Penguins Radio Network

Ownership
- Owner: Priority Communications
- Sister stations: WCED

History
- First air date: February 14, 1990 (at 99.5)
- Former call signs: WDDH (1988–1989, CP)
- Former frequencies: 99.5 MHz (1990–1997)
- Call sign meaning: "DuBois Sunny"

Technical information
- Licensing authority: FCC
- Facility ID: 53580
- Class: A
- ERP: 6,000 watts
- HAAT: 100 meters (330 ft)
- Translator: 98.7 W254BU (Brookville) 107.9 W300BR (Dubois)

Links
- Public license information: Public file; LMS
- Website: sunny106.fm

WDSN (106.5 FM) is a commercial radio station, licensed to the community of Reynoldsville, Pennsylvania. WDSN broadcasts at an effective radiated power of 3,000 Watts. WDSN and its AM sister station, WCED, are owned and operated by Priority Communications of Pittsburgh, Pennsylvania.

== History ==
This station was first assigned the call letters WDDH, the last three as the initials of Elk County industrialist Dennis Heindl, who had applied for the construction permit in his wife Paula's name in the late 1980s. Heindl, who had owned WLMI in Kane, sold both WLMI and the construction permit for WDDH to separate owners. WLMI came under the control of a new owner in 1989, and the WDDH construction permit was sold in 1990 to Pittsburgh radio entrepreneur Jay Phillipone, who would build a small empire out of Priority Communications for himself with this station as his flagship, as he acquired more properties over the years.

WDSN first began broadcasting on 99.5 FM from studios on West Long Avenue in DuBois. It later moved to 106.5 FM in 1997 as part of a strategic move to accommodate another station (WKQL 103.3 FM) to go on the air in Brookville, about ten miles west of Reynoldsville.

WDSN acquired an AM station, WCED, in 2003 from Vox Media. WCED joined its new FM sister at 51 West Long Avenue in downtown DuBois. Needing more room to better accommodate a News/Talk formatted radio station, WDSN and WCED moved across and down the street to a former bank building at 12 West Long Avenue, where they continue to operate today. The station operated a translator in Punxsutawney on 94.7 FM (W234AV, Now simulcasting WEIR). They also operated a translator on 105.9 (W290BO) in Brookville, PA. As of November 10, 2011, the station applied for a different translator for Brookville, 98.7; it is now operational, and 105.9 is dark.
