= Rockton Mountain Trails =

Network of hiking trails in Pennsylvania, United States

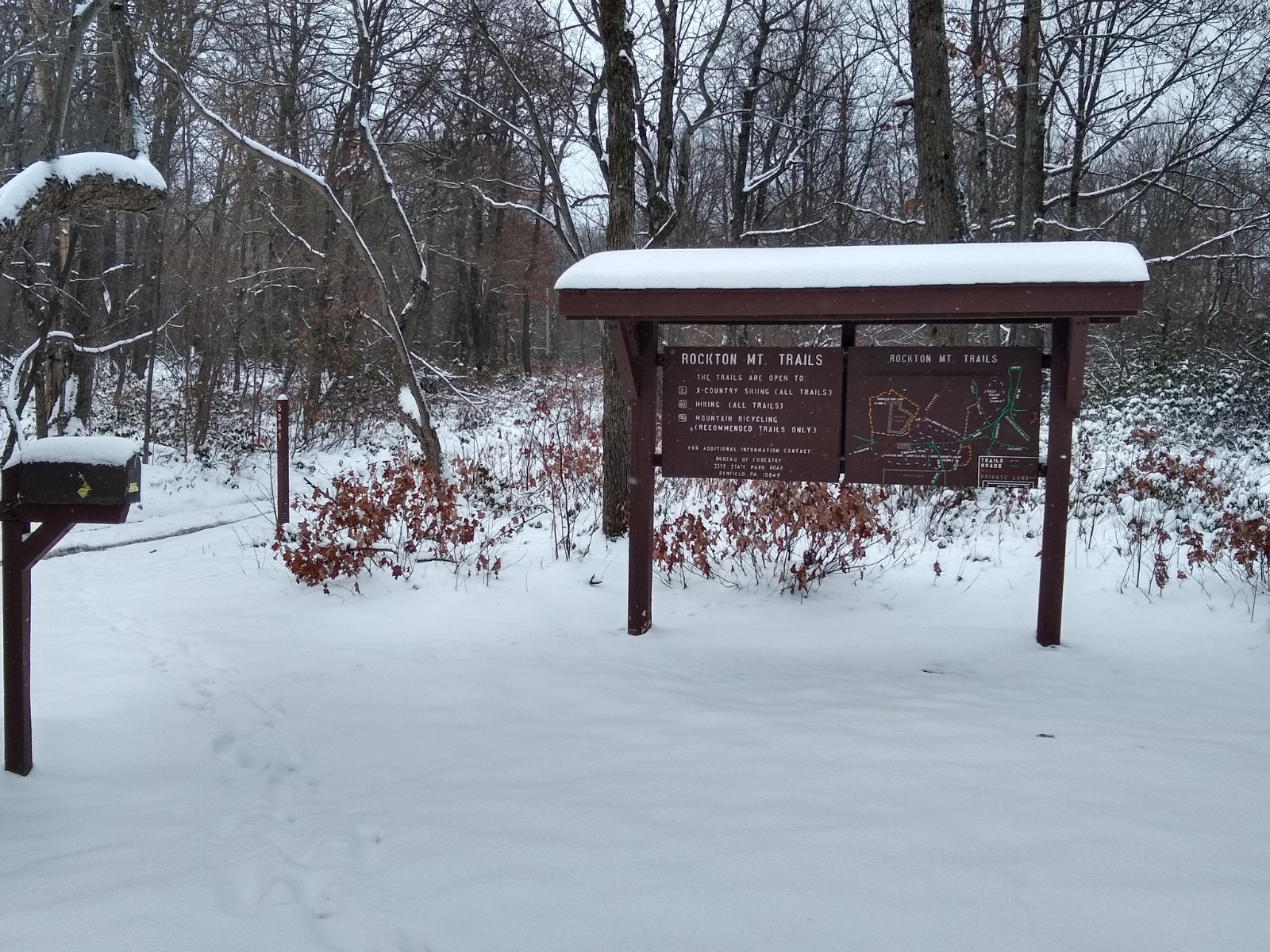
- The trailhead for the Rockton Mountain Trails system
- Length: 17.1 mi (27.5 km)
- Location: Clearfield County, Pennsylvania, US
- Use: Hiking, cross-country skiing, mountain biking
- Elevation change: Moderate
- Difficulty: Moderate
- Season: Year-round; hiking and biking discouraged during winter months
- Hazards: Uneven and rocky terrain, rattlesnakes, mosquitoes, ticks, black bears

The Rockton Mountain Trails are an approximately 17.1-mile (27.5 km) network of connected hiking trails in central Pennsylvania, in Moshannon State Forest. The total trail distance includes several different linear trails that can be used to form one-way and loop hikes of various lengths. The trail system is also often used for cross-country skiing, with some segments available for mountain biking as well.

== Description ==
The Rockton Mountain Trails were constructed starting in 1993, with a volunteer named Ben Irwin leading the efforts. Trails were built to reach scenic areas along Panther Run, Horn Shanty Stream, and Coupler Run. The area was selected for its heavy snowfall in order to attract cross-country skiers during the winter, though other users are welcomed during non-winter months. The trailhead is found on US Route 322, about three miles west of its northern interchange with Pennsylvania Route 153, or about four miles east of the village of Rockton.
