= Burns Run (Montgomery Run tributary) =

Stream in Pennsylvania, USA

Burns Run Tributary to Montgomery Run
- Location of Burns Run mouth Burns Run (Montgomery Run tributary) (the United States)

Location
- Country: United States
- State: Pennsylvania
- County: Clearfield

Physical characteristics
- Source: Coupler Run divide
  - location: about 3 miles east of Rockton, Pennsylvania
  - coordinates: 41°04′51″N 078°36′22″W
  - elevation: 1,980 ft (600 m)
- Mouth
  - location: about 2.5 miles northeast of Rockton, Pennsylvania
  - coordinates: 41°05′45″N 078°37′00″W
  - elevation: 1,703 ft (519 m)
- Length: 1.43 mi (2.30 km)
- Basin size: 1.19 square miles (3.1 km^{2})
- Discharge
  - location: Montgomery Run
  - average: 18.94 cu ft/s (0.536 m^{3}/s) at mouth with Montgomery Run

Basin features
- Progression: Montgomery Run → Anderson Creek → West Branch Susquehanna River → Susquehanna River → Chesapeake Bay → Atlantic Ocean
- River system: Susquehanna River
- Tributaries
  - left: unnamed tributaries
  - right: unnamed tributaries
- Bridges: none

Burns Run is a 1.43 mi (2.30 km) long 1st order tributary to Montgomery Run in Clearfield County, Pennsylvania.

== Course ==
Burns Run rises about 3 miles east of Rockton, Pennsylvania, and then flows generally north-northwest to join Montgomery Run about 2.5 miles northeast of Rockton.

== Watershed ==
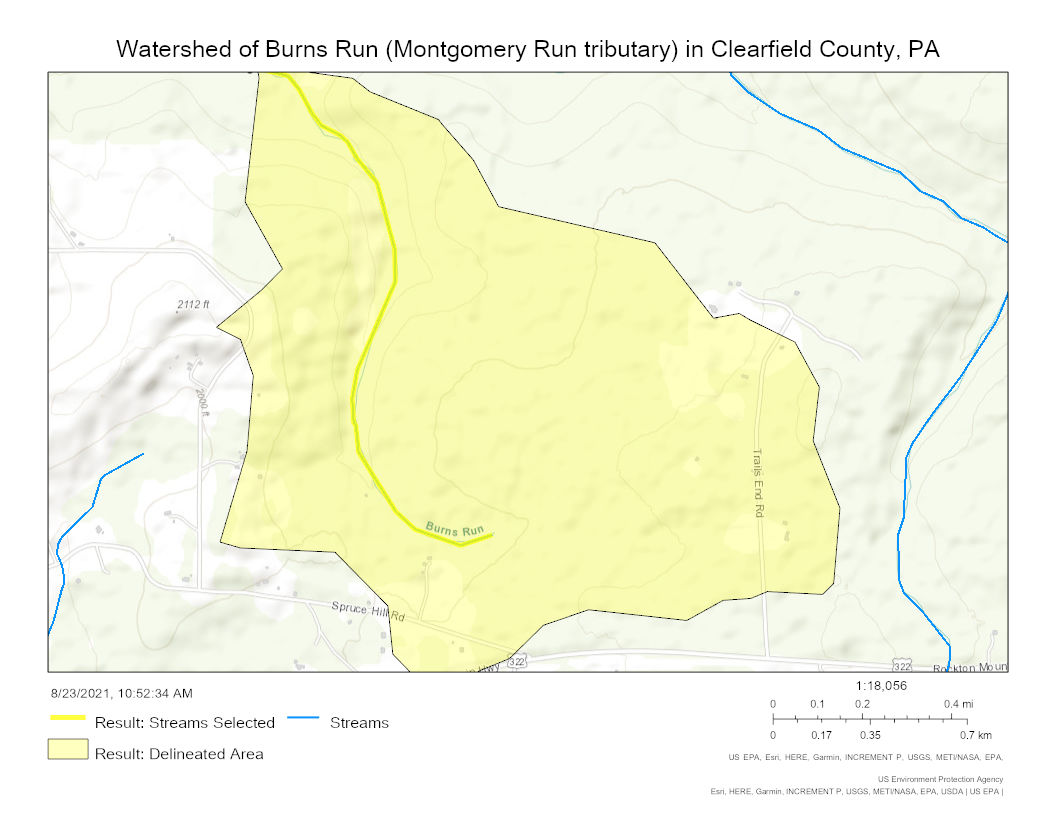
Course and Watershed of Burns Run (Montgomery Run tributary) in Clearfield County, Pennsylvania, USA

Burns Run drains 1.19 square miles (3.1 km^{2}) of area, receives about 45.3 in/year of precipitation, has a wetness index of 430.05, and is about 93% forested.

== See also ==
- List of Pennsylvania Rivers
