= Montgomery Run (Anderson Creek tributary) =

Stream in Pennsylvania, USA

Montgomery Run Tributary to Anderson Creek
- Location of Montgomery Run mouth Montgomery Run (Anderson Creek tributary) (the United States)

Location
- Country: United States
- State: Pennsylvania
- County: Clearfield

Physical characteristics
- Source: Moose Creek divide
  - location: about 5 miles south-southwest of Anderson Creek, Pennsylvania
  - coordinates: 41°06′36″N 078°33′21″W
  - elevation: 2,055 ft (626 m)
- Mouth
  - location: about 2 miles northeast of Rockton, Pennsylvania
  - coordinates: 41°05′46″N 078°37′26″W
  - elevation: 1,675 ft (511 m)
- Length: 4.70 mi (7.56 km)
- Basin size: 10.11 square miles (26.2 km^{2})
- Discharge
  - location: Anderson Creek
  - average: 18.94 cu ft/s (0.536 m^{3}/s) at mouth with Anderson Creek

Basin features
- Progression: Anderson Creek → West Branch Susquehanna River → Susquehanna River → Chesapeake Bay → Atlantic Ocean
- River system: Susquehanna River
- Tributaries
  - left: Coupler Run; Burns Run
  - right: unnamed tributaries
- Bridges: Kelley Cellar Road

Montgomery Run is a 4.70 mi (7.56 km) long 2nd order tributary to Anderson Creek in Clearfield County, Pennsylvania.

== Course ==
Montgomery Run rises about 2 miles northeast of Rockton, Pennsylvania, and then flows generally southwest to join Anderson Creek about 5 miles south-southwest of Anderson Creek.

== Watershed ==
Montgomery Run drains 10.11 square miles (26.2 km^{2}) of area, receives about 45.8 in/year of precipitation, has a wetness index of 446.10, and is about 93% forested.

== See also ==
- List of Pennsylvania Rivers

== Watershed Maps ==
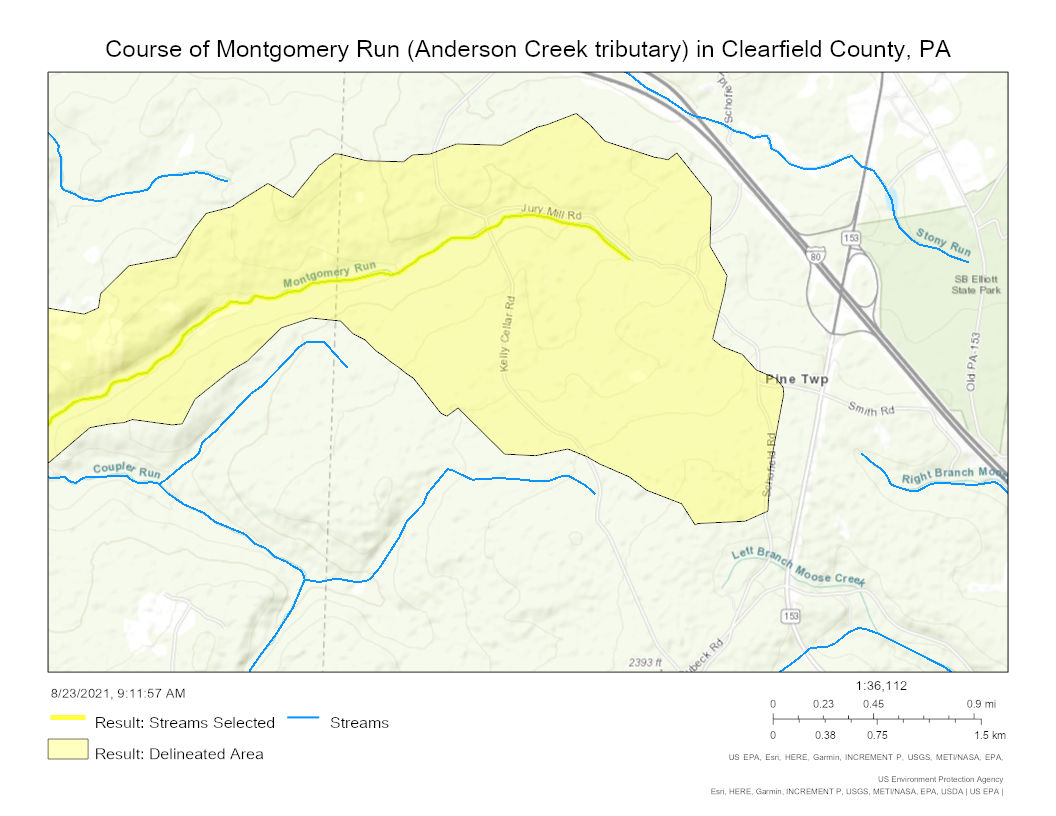
Course of Montgomery Run (Anderson Creek tributary) in Clearfield County, Pennsylvania, USA

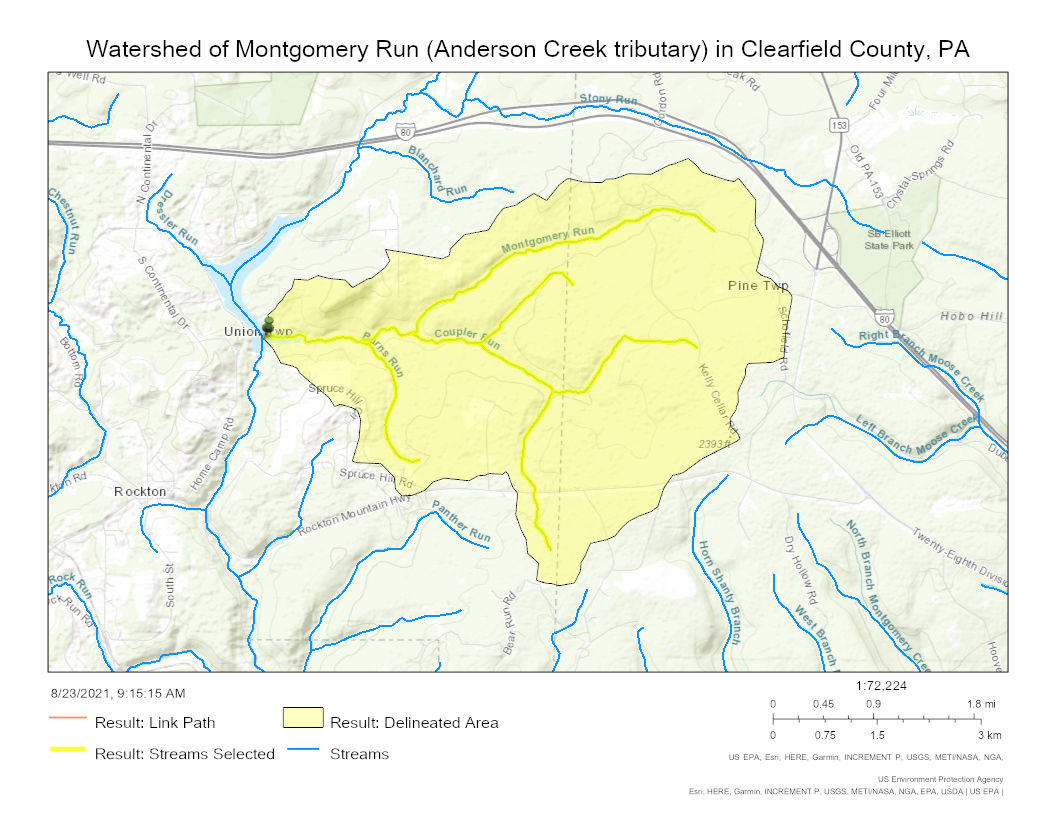
Watershed of Montgomery Run (Anderson Creek tributary) in Clearfield County, Pennsylvania, USA
