= WWVA (AM) =

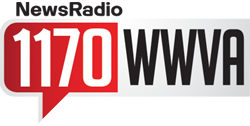
- Wheeling, West Virginia; United States
- Broadcast area: Wheeling metropolitan area
- Frequency: 1170 kHz
- Branding: NewsRadio 1170 WWVA

Programming
- Format: News/talk
- Affiliations: Compass Media Networks; Fox News Radio; iHeartRadio; Premiere Networks

Ownership
- Owner: iHeartMedia; (iHM Licenses, LLC)
- Sister stations: WBBD; WEGW; WKWK-FM; WOVK; WVKF

History
- First air date: December 13, 1926
- Former frequencies: 860 kHz (1926–1941)
- Call sign meaning: Wheeling, West Virginia

Technical information
- Licensing authority: FCC
- Facility ID: 44046
- Class: A
- Power: 50,000 watts
- Transmitter coordinates: 40°06′07″N 80°52′02″W

Links
- Public license information: Public file; LMS
- Webcast: Listen live (via iHeartRadio)
- Website: newsradio1170.iheart.com

WWVA (1170 kHz, NewsRadio 1170) is an AM radio station in Wheeling, West Virginia, owned by iHeartMedia.

It is West Virginia's only class A, 50,000–watt clear-channel station, sharing the frequency's Class A status with KOTV in Tulsa, Oklahoma, and KJNP in North Pole, Alaska. Its transmitter site is located at a three-tower facility in St. Clairsville, Ohio.

During the day, a single, nondirectional tower beams its full power to northern West Virginia, southwestern Pennsylvania (including Pittsburgh), and eastern Ohio (as far as Akron). At night, power is fed to all three towers in a directional pattern to protect KOTV. Even with this restriction, it can still be heard in most of the eastern two-thirds of the United States, as well as most of Canada, with a good radio.

WWVA is one of the Local Primary 1 Emergency Alert System stations in the Wheeling area.

== Programming ==
The BloomDaddy Experience hosts the AM-Drive portion of WWVA. The Glenn Beck Program, The Sean Hannity Show, and The Clay Travis and Buck Sexton Show air in late mornings, middays, afternoons, and early evenings, respectively. WWVA airs paid religious programming in the late evenings and Coast to Coast AM in the overnight. This Morning, America's First News with Gordon Deal is also carried in the early morning.

WWVA produces Extension Calling, a local agricultural education program recorded by the Ohio State University and West Virginia University extension agents, aired Sunday mornings for over 40 years.

== History ==
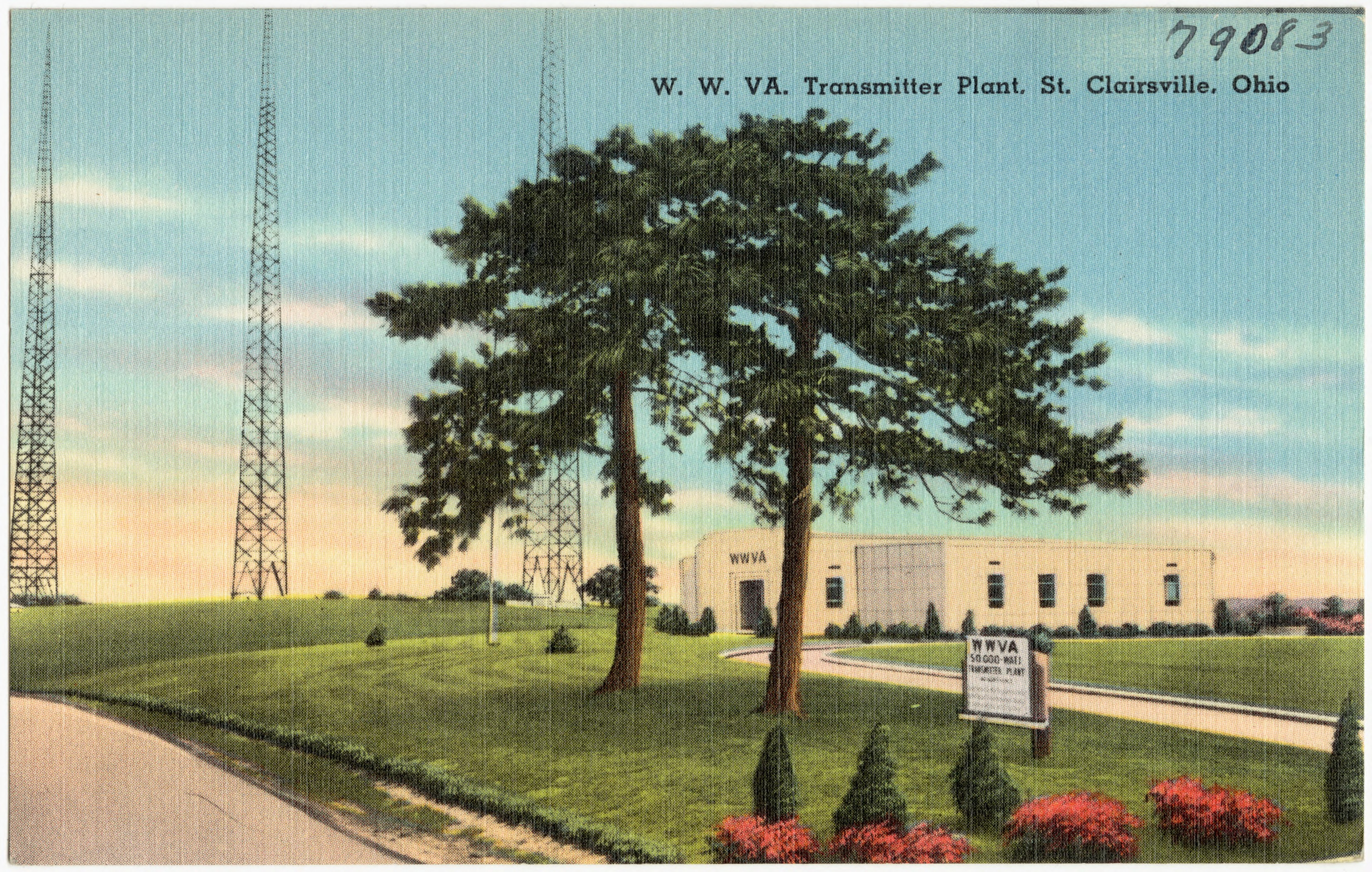
Transmitter circa 1940s

WWVA began broadcasting at 2 a.m. on December 13, 1926, when John Stroebel threw the switch that sent power to a home-built 50-watt transmitter in the basement of his home. One week earlier, the Commerce Department granted a broadcast license on 860 kHz to the radio station WWVA. In its first year of operation, it broadcast to listeners with home-made crystal sets, principally from Stroebel's own home. The call letters are derived from the words Wheeling, West Virginia (WWVA), as U.S. postal codes were once written out with three letters such as WVA for West Virginia, hence Wheeling, WVA became "WWVA".

Through the years, WWVA has been granted several power increases. In May 1941, the FCC moved WWVA to 1170, and in August of that same year, granted it the highest power for AM stations: 50,000 watts. With the increase, WWVA became the most powerful AM station in West Virginia.

WWVA has changed hands many times over the years. Past owners include Fidelity Investments, West Virginia Broadcasting Corporation, Storer Broadcasting, Basic Communications, Screen Gems Radio - a division of Columbia Pictures, Coca-Cola, Price Broadcasting, Osborn Communications, Atlantic Star Communications, AMFM Inc., and Clear Channel Communications.

WWVA's broadcast history includes the airing of such notable live broadcasts as President Dwight D. Eisenhower's 1952 visit to the Wheeling area.

In the 1980s, WWVA briefly enjoyed a reputation as one of the leading radio news operations in the country, and won several national news-reporting awards under the leadership of prominent broadcast journalists such as Jim Forsyth and Colleen Marshall, but that reputation faded in the 1990s. Harvey, however, remained on the station's schedule, as did the legendary Jamboree USA and Jamboree in the Hills broadcasts. The WWVA Jamboree broadcasts started on January 7, 1933, and were even transmitted to troops abroad during World War II.

Under Basic Communications ownership, the Jamboree became the centerpiece of an all-contemporary country western format starting on November 8, 1965, a format that saw ratings skyrocket weeks after it debuted. "This is WWVA, the big country" was their signature. In 1970, the studios and the Jamboree moved to the Capitol Music Hall, a civic center that is the largest in West Virginia.

This country music format lasted until November 1997, when WWVA abandoned it in favor of news/talk. Assumption of ownership by Clear Channel Communications resulted in the addition of such hosts as Rush Limbaugh and Glenn Beck. A series of cost-cutting moves in January 2004, resulted in the elimination of both local talk hosts (George Kellas and Jim Harrington) and most of the news department. Coinciding with this was an attempt to relocate the station to Stow, Ohio, under an FCC major construction permit four weeks later. This application was withdrawn in August 2004.

former logo

Since then, much of WWVA's programming emulates regional sister station WHLO in Akron, Ohio. One local link to the station's past was the afternoon drive show hosted by former sportscaster Steve Novotney, but he was also fired from WWVA in November 2006. At the time, the only local talk show remaining on WWVA was Saturday Sports Day with John Simonson, but WWVA, then in negotiations with new ownership, made a bold move when they paid more money to David Bloomquist to export his Bloomdaddy Experience from rival local station, WKKX in late May/early June 2007. The move was controversial (though the reason given by WKKX to let Bloomquist go was in connection with the Don Imus Rutgers controversy that transpired on MSNBC around that same time), as WKKX members appeared bitter about the exit. Clear Channel began to syndicate Bloomdaddy through the Northeast and Midwest after the cancellation of The War Room with Quinn and Rose in November 2013.

The Original Wheeling Radio Jamboree (formerly Jamboree USA) is the second-longest running program in radio history (The Grand Ole Opry on WSM Nashville is the oldest, having first aired in 1925). However, the Jamboree was dropped from WWVA's schedule in December 2008, and went to WKKX for a time. In 2015, it was picked up by community station WWOV-LP/101.1.

On August 4, 2010, a severe thunderstorm, classified as a "down-burst" by the National Weather Service, pushed through the Wheeling area, knocking the three–tower array, located in nearby St. Clairsville, Ohio, to the ground. The station was taken completely off the air and took its programming to sister station WBBD on August 5. On August 5, 2010, at 10:30 pm, transmissions on 1170 AM were restored using temporary equipment.

On November 16, 2006, WWVA, WOVK, WVKF, WKWK, WEGW, and WBBD were announced for sale as part of Clear Channel's divestiture of almost 450 small and middle-market radio properties in the U.S. The Clear Channel Wheeling stations were initially slated to be sold to Florida-based GoodRadio.TV LLC in May 2007, but the deal soon collapsed prior to FCC approval.
