= Coupler Run =

Stream in Pennsylvania, US

Coupler Run Tributary to Montgomery Run
- Location of Coupler Run mouth Coupler Run (the United States)

Location
- Country: United States
- State: Pennsylvania
- County: Clearfield

Physical characteristics
- Source: Bear Run divide
  - location: about 5 miles east-southeast of Rockton, Pennsylvania
  - coordinates: 41°04′07″N 078°35′03″W
  - elevation: 2,250 ft (690 m)
- Mouth
  - location: about 3 miles northeast of Rockton, Pennsylvania
  - coordinates: 41°05′49″N 078°36′28″W
  - elevation: 1,741 ft (531 m)
- Length: 3.04 mi (4.89 km)
- Basin size: 4.53 square miles (11.7 km^{2})
- Discharge
  - location: Montgomery Run
  - average: 8.71 cu ft/s (0.247 m^{3}/s) at mouth with Montgomery Run

Basin features
- Progression: Montgomery Run → Anderson Creek → West Branch Susquehanna River → Susquehanna River → Chesapeake Bay → Atlantic Ocean
- River system: Susquehanna River
- Tributaries
  - left: unnamed tributaries
  - right: unnamed tributaries
- Bridges: US 322

Coupler Run is a 3.04 mi (4.89 km) long 2nd order tributary to Montgomery Run in Clearfield County, Pennsylvania. This is the only stream of this name in the United States.

== Course ==
Coupler Run rises about 5 miles east-southeast of Rockton, Pennsylvania, and then flows north and northwest to join Montgomery Run about 3 miles northeast of Rockton.

== Watershed ==
Coupler Run drains 4.53 square miles (11.7 km^{2}) of area, receives about 46.2 in/year of precipitation, has a wetness index of 452.11, and is about 95% forested.

== See also ==
- List of Pennsylvania Rivers

== Watershed Maps ==
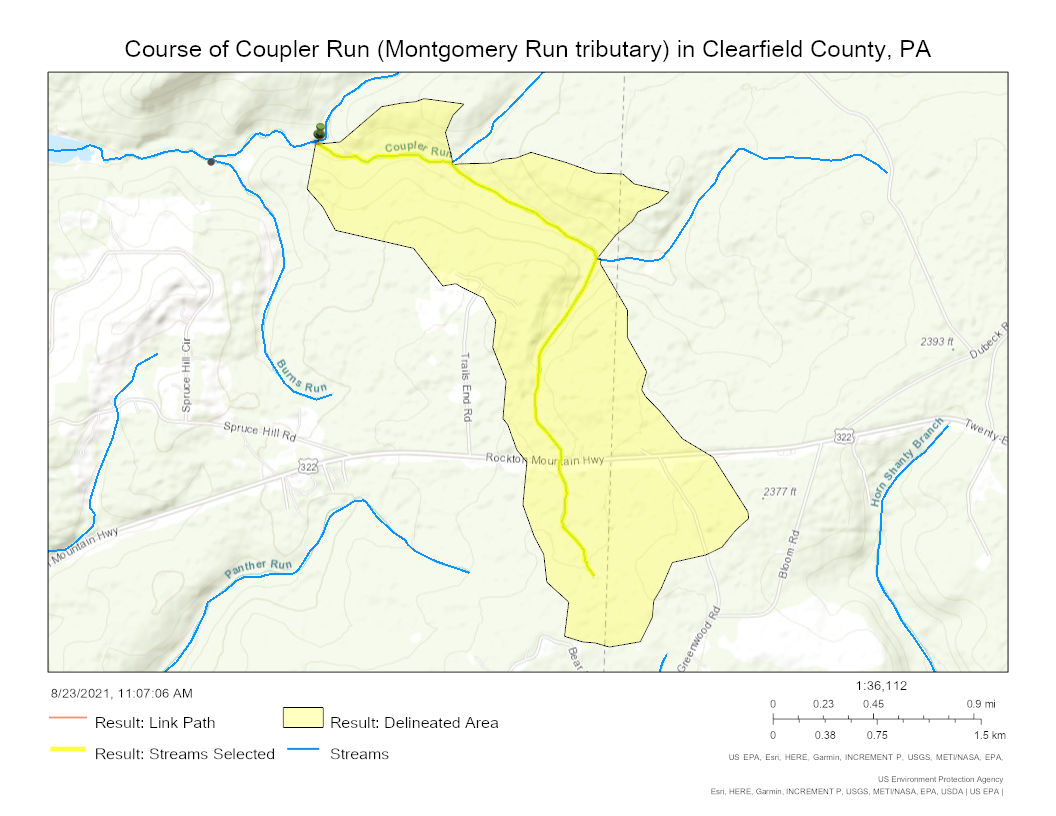
Course of Coupler Run in Clearfield County, Pennsylvania, USA

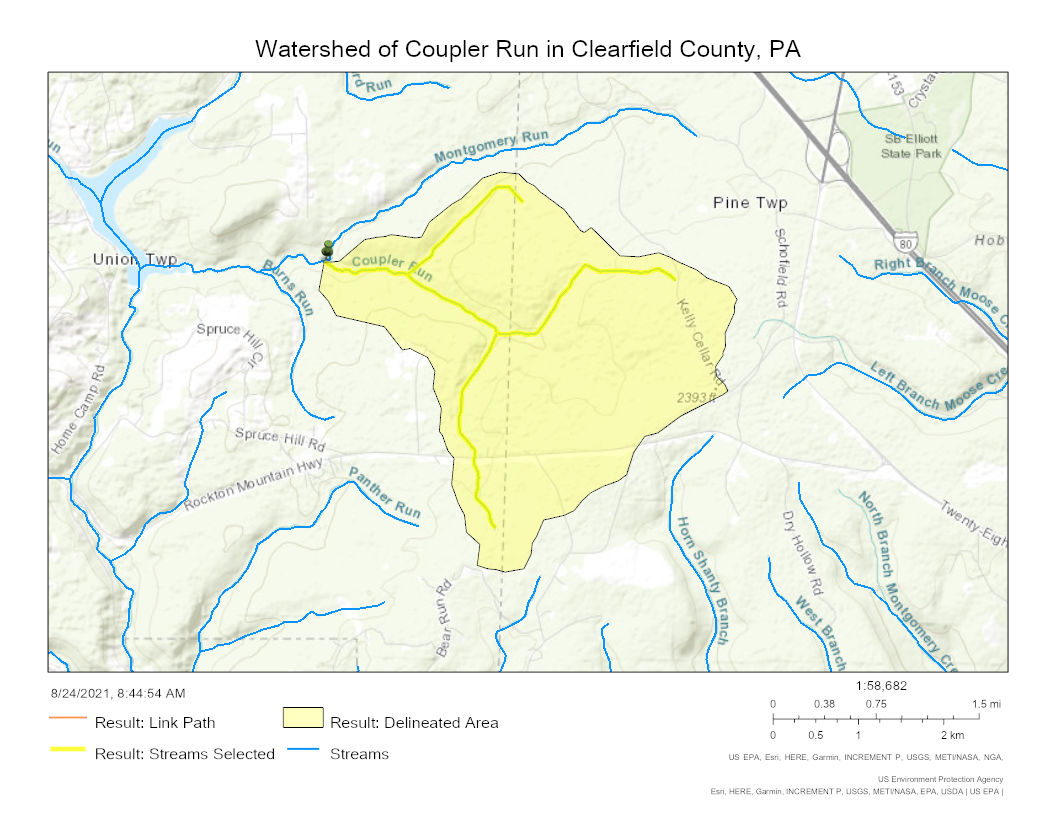
Watershed of Coupler Run in Clearfield County, Pennsylvania, USA
