= WCED (disambiguation) =

WCED may refer to:

- Radio station WCED ("News/Talk 1420 WCED") in DuBois, Pennsylvania.
- The World Commission on Environment and Development, commonly known as the Brundtland Commission.
- The Western Cape Education Department, a government department in the Western Cape province of South Africa.
