= WCED =

Coordinates: 41°08′31″N 78°48′07″W

- DuBois, Pennsylvania; United States
- Frequency: 1420 kHz
- Branding: Connect FM 96.7 & 99.7

Programming
- Language: English
- Format: News/talk and sports radio
- Affiliations: Fox News Radio; Infinity Sports Network; Compass Media Networks; Premiere Networks; Radio America; Westwood One; Pittsburgh Pirates Radio Network

Ownership
- Owner: Priority Communications
- Sister stations: WDSN

History
- First air date: February 1941; 85 years ago
- Call sign meaning: "Continental Eastern Divide"

Technical information
- Licensing authority: FCC
- Facility ID: 67703
- Class: D
- Power: 4,200 watts (day); 5 watts (night)
- Translators: 96.7 W244CH (Rockton); 99.7 W259DC (DuBois)

Links
- Public license information: Public file; LMS
- Webcast: Listen live
- Website: www.connectradio.fm

WCED (1420 AM, "Connect FM 96.7 & 99.7") is a commercial radio station, licensed to the city of DuBois, Pennsylvania. WCED broadcasts with a power output of 4,200 watts during the day and 5 watts at night using a non-directional antenna system. WCED and its FM sister station WDSN are owned and operated by Priority Communications of Pittsburgh, Pennsylvania.

== History ==
For much of its existence, WCED was the sister station of FM station WOWQ, also licensed to DuBois, which had a country music format and was known by the moniker Q102. The stations were owned by Derrick Publishing, of Oil City, Pennsylvania, which did business as Tri-County Broadcasting and also published the Oil City Derrick newspaper.

WCED became known for its full-service approach to local programming for both DuBois and the tri-county area, which includes Clearfield, Jefferson, and Elk counties. It also became the local radio outlet for ABC News, airing Paul Harvey and other full-service network program offerings. The station also offered music formats such as CHR, oldies, nostalgia, and some talk, but the station would go to a news and talk format after its sale to Priority Communications.

WCED and WOWQ were among the first stations in the country to use computer-based hard-disk audio storage technology in the early 1990s.

In 1999, both stations were sold to Vox Media. Vox sold WOWQ to First Media and then WCED in 2003 to Priority Communications, which had been operating competitor WDSN since its first air date on February 14, 1990. First Media had been operating WCED under an LMA, but had no interest in owning it.

WCED moved to a new, nearby building and vacated the former DuBois Lumber Company office building after the sale to Priority. The purchase price for WCED was $150,000, according to FCC records. In 2003, WCED moved from 80 North Park Place to 51 West Long Avenue in DuBois, where it shared space with WDSN temporarily until a new facility conducive to a news/talk formatted radio station could be found. Priority Communications negotiated a deal for an old bank building at 12 West Long Avenue, down the street from its original location. Both stations were moved into the new, state-of-the-art facility by the end of 2004.

== Operations ==
Although WCED is licensed to DuBois, the transmitter is located in the Falls Creek/Washington Twp area of Jefferson County. The station uses translators on 96.7 in Rockton (as W244CH) and 107.9 FM in DuBois (as W300BR) to extend the coverage.

The station operates a two tower array, but for years before, operated with three towers. One tower collapsed due to high winds in a March 2005 storm and was not replaced. The phasors and feed system were modified, and the nighttime power level was significantly reduced from the original 500 watts. It now radiates a cardioid pattern into the DuBois local area only at night, while continuing to operate daytime-non-directional at the rated 5,000 watts.

== Programming ==
Originally billed as News Talk Radio WCED, the station airs local and syndicated talk programming during the daytime hours and Infinity Sports Network during the evening hours. While the program offerings are relatively the same, the station now acknowledges its FM translators at 96.7, 99.7, and 107.9, and puts them at the forefront of all marketing efforts, hence the new moniker "Connect FM".

A local morning newscast airs Monday through Friday for two hours. The current weekday lineup of nationally radio personalities including This Morning with Gordon Deal, Bill Kilmede, and Markly van Camp & Robbins. Weekend syndicated shows include Sunday Nights with Bill Cunningham. The station also serves as a part-time affiliate of Fox Sports Radio.

The station also serves as the local affiliate of the Pittsburgh Pirates Radio Network and broadcasts all team games.
