= WMOA =

Radio station in Marietta, Ohio

- Marietta, Ohio; United States
- Broadcast area: Parkersburg-Marietta
- Frequency: 1490 kHz
- Branding: WMOA 1490

Programming
- Format: Full-service and adult contemporary
- Affiliations: ABC News Radio

Ownership
- Owner: Jawco, Inc.
- Sister stations: WJAW, WJAW-FM

History
- First air date: 1947
- Call sign meaning: Marietta, Ohio

Technical information
- Licensing authority: FCC
- Facility ID: 54265
- Class: C
- Power: 1,000 watts
- Transmitter coordinates: 39°25′09″N 81°28′35″W
- Translator: 101.3 W267CQ (Marietta)

Links
- Public license information: Public file; LMS
- Webcast: Listen live
- Website: wmoa1490.com

WMOA (1490 AM) is a commercial radio station licensed to Marietta, Ohio, United States, featuring a full-service and adult contemporary format. The station covers much of the Mid-Ohio Valley, which includes parts of Southeastern Ohio and Northwestern West Virginia around the cities of Marietta and Parkersburg, West Virginia.

== History ==
WMOA began broadcasting as an experimental station in September 1946 from a garage in Williamstown, West Virginia, across the Ohio River from Marietta. The station, upon receiving a Federal Communications Commission (FCC) license, relocated its broadcast studios to the basement of the historic Lafayette Hotel in downtown Marietta. The studios relocated again to the Citizen's Bank Building during the latter part of the 20th century before settling at their current location on Lancaster Street in Marietta.

== Programming ==
The station currently advertises itself as "Local Radio" and features a variety of generally local interest broadcasting. The station is currently affiliated with ABC Radio for national news updates, and broadcasts live sporting events for nearby Marietta College. Besides ABC News updates twice hourly, the station features local on-air talent and Adult Contemporary music for the bulk of their broadcast day, The station primarily provides coverage of the Cincinnati Reds and Ohio State University football, but also airs Cincinnati Bengals, Cleveland Browns, Cleveland Guardians, Ohio University Bobcats football, and local high school sports broadcasts.
