= Blame My Roots Festival =

Annual festival of country music in Morristown, Ohio

- Genre: Country
- Dates: 3rd week of July (Friday-Sunday)
- Locations: Valley View Campgrounds, Belmont, Ohio (2019, 2021–2023)
- Years active: 2019, 2021–2022
- Founders: Chris Dutton, Nina Dutton, and Dino Giovannone
- Attendance: 12,000 +
- Website: Festival Website

Blame My Roots Festival was an annual festival of country music in Morristown, Belmont County, Ohio. Founded by Chris Dutton, Nina Dutton, and Dino Giovannone, the annual festival debuted in 2019 when Jamboree in the Hills went on hiatus. The annual festival is held at the Valley View Campgrounds in Morristown, Ohio. The venue has hosted Jamboree in the Hills campers for 28 years and served as a venue for after parties. In the festivals debut year it showcased a variety of new, veteran, and legendary musicians on two different stages. Morristown is about 1½ hours west of Pittsburgh, and 20 minutes west of Wheeling, West Virginia.

In 2020, the Festival was canceled due to the COVID-19 pandemic concerns. The annual festival has announced its return slated for 2021.

In September 2022, festival organizers announced that the festival would be postponed in 2023 as organizers actively seek a festival for 2024.

On November 6, 2023, festival organizers announced that the festival would be retired after being unable to book a headliner for 2024. Organizers also cited that there is too much competition with other concerts, tours and festivals throughout the region for the Blame My Roots Fest to exist.

== History ==
The inaugural Blame My Roots Festival was held July 18–20, 2019

=== 2019 ===
The festival's first announced lineup featured headliners The Stickers on Thursday, July 18; Trace Adkins on Friday, July 19; and Tyler Farr on Saturday, July 20. The lineup included primarily country artists and bands.

The lineup, ordered as advertised on the festival's website, is as follows:

- Gypsy Cowboy
- Tim Ullom Band
- The Stickers
- Barnesville Community Alumni Band
- Walker Montgomery
- 11/70 Band
- Whiskey Myers
- Dillon Carmichael
- Joe Diffie
- Trace Adkins
- Old Buddy Jack
- Jo Ann Jones
- Sydney Mack
- Joe Zelek
- Whey Jennings
- Gabby Barrett
- Ryan Hurd
- Lindsay Ell
- Kyle Daniel
- Tyler Farr
- Frank Vieira

=== 2020 (canceled due to COVID-19 pandemic) ===
Dates for the 2020 Blame My Roots Festival were Thursday, July 16 through Sunday, July 18. Artists that were scheduled to perform included:

- Justin Moore
- Neal McCoy
- Tracy Lawrence
- Jo Dee Messina
- Gone West (band) Ft. Colbie Caillat
- Black Stone Cherry
- Whey Jennings
- The Kentucky Headhunters
- Walker Montgomery
- Allie Colleen
- Thomas Gabriel
- George Shingleton
- 11/70 Band

=== 2021 ===
Dates for the 2021 Blame My Roots Festival are Friday, July 16 through Sunday, July 17. Artists that are announced to perform include:

- Friday: Neal McCoy, Joe Dee Messina, Adam Doleac, Walker Montgomery
- Saturday: Miranda Lambert, Lee Brice, Tenille Townes, Niko Moon, Allie Colleen

=== 2022 ===
Dates for the 2022 Blame My Roots Festival are Thursday, July 14 through Sunday, July 16. Artists that are announced to perform include:

- Thursday: Niko Moon, Walker Montgomery
- Friday: Chase Rice, Randy Houser, Priscilla Block, Levi Hummon
- Saturday: Dierks Bentley, Ashley McBryde, David Lee Murphy, James Barker Band

=== 2023 ===
Blame My Roots Festival 2023 was announced as postponed.

=== 2024 ===
Blame My Roots Festival was announced as retired for 2024 after being unable to book a headliner for the festival.
