= WYMJ =

- New Martinsville, West Virginia; United States
- Frequency: 99.5 kHz
- Branding: Power Country 99.5

Programming
- Format: Country

Ownership
- Owner: Dailey Corporation
- Sister stations: WETZ

History
- Former call signs: WNMF

Technical information
- Licensing authority: FCC
- Facility ID: 79304
- Class: A
- ERP: 2,700 watts
- HAAT: 147 meters (483 feet)
- Transmitter coordinates: 39°39′10″N 80°54′47″W

Links
- Public license information: Public file; LMS
- Website: www.powercountry995.com

WYMJ (99.5 FM, "Power Country 99.5") is a radio station licensed to serve New Martinsville, West Virginia. The station is owned by the Dailey Corporation. It airs a country music format.

The station was assigned the WYMJ call letters by the Federal Communications Commission on February 13, 2001.

On November 7, 2011 WYMJ changed its format to country, branded as "Power Country 99.5".
