= WBBD =

- Wheeling, West Virginia; United States
- Broadcast area: Wheeling metro area
- Frequency: 1400 kHz
- Branding: Fox Sports AM 1400

Programming
- Language: English
- Format: Sports
- Affiliations: Fox Sports Radio

Ownership
- Owner: iHeartMedia, Inc.; (iHM Licenses, LLC)
- Sister stations: WEGW; WKWK-FM; WOVK; WVKF; WWVA

History
- First air date: May 2, 1941
- Former call signs: WKWK (1941–1996)
- Call sign meaning: "Big band"

Technical information
- Licensing authority: FCC
- Facility ID: 73192
- Class: C
- Power: 1,000 watts
- Transmitter coordinates: 40°5′49.0″N 80°42′6.0″W
- Translator: 103.9 W280EW (Wheeling)

Links
- Public license information: Public file; LMS
- Webcast: Listen live (via iHeartRadio)
- Website: foxsports1400wheeling.iheart.com

WBBD (1400 AM) is a commercial radio station licensed to Wheeling, West Virginia, United States, carrying a sports format. Owned by iHeartMedia, WBBD serves both the Wheeling metropolitan area and nearby St. Clairsville, Ohio, as the market's Fox Sports Radio affiliate. WBBD's studios are currently located at the Capitol Theatre in downtown Wheeling, while its transmitter resides in the city's northern end. In addition to a standard analog transmission, WBBD is relayed over low-power FM translator W280EW (103.9 FM) and is available online via iHeartRadio.

WBBD was established in 1941 as WKWK, which aired network programming in the 1940s and 1950s before emerging as a Top 40 station in the 1960s and 1970s. Later operating various oldies and adult standards formats, it has broadcast Fox Sports Radio since 2014 after a brief period airing comedy radio.

== History ==
On July 10, 1940, Community Broadcasting applied with the Federal Communications Commission (FCC) to build a new radio station at 1370 kHz in Wheeling. This application was approved on November 26 of that year, and after being changed to 1400 kHz as part of NARBA reallocation in March 1941, WKWK began broadcasting on May 2 of that year as an affiliate of CBS. It operated with 100 watts of power, raised to 250 later that year, from studios at the corner of 16th and Market streets. Its owner was Joe L. Smith, Jr., son of Joe L. Smith, a Democratic U.S. representative for the state; its first general manager was John B. Reynolds, who resigned from his post as assistant secretary of the FCC to run the new Wheeling outlet. The station remained with CBS until 1947, when it traded network affiliations with the more powerful WWVA (1170 AM) and became an ABC outlet. The next year, it expanded to the FM band with the launch of WKWK-FM 97.3 on March 17, 1948; the region's third FM outlet in operation, it initially served as a simulcaster for the AM output.

Smith Jr. sold his stake in WKWK-AM-FM in 1951 to Reynolds, who had held 49 percent of the business. The AM transmitter was relocated from its existing site to be co-sited with the FM transmitter on Glenwood Road in 1958.

Reynolds died after a long illness on March 22, 1959; he was 62. Reynolds's estate wasted little time in selling the WKWK stations, reaching a deal in August with Lewis W. Dickey, who had been an advertising salesman for WWVA. It was the first station owned by Dickey, the father of later Cumulus Media president Lew Dickey, who was credited with turning around the new acquisition; also during his tenure as owner, the station increased its power to 1,000 watts.

The WKWK stations were sold again in 1965 to WK, Inc., a company owned by the Resources and Facilities Corporation (REFAC)—a company controlled by Eugene Lang—and Victor Oristano, for $575,000. Four years later, the pair were purchased by Publishers Broadcasting Corporation, a subsidiary of the Washington-based Publishers Co., for $649,000. The contract printing and binding concern was making an incursion into broadcasting by buying stations to build what it hoped would be a maximum-size group; prior to acquiring the outlets in Wheeling, it had purchased an AM-FM combo in Tallahassee, Florida. The company renamed itself Camptown Industries in December 1972; having not bought any additional stations beyond those in Wheeling and Tallahassee, it had instead diversified into owning the Uline Arena in Washington, D.C., and the namesake Camptown at East Lake Toho in Osceola, Florida. During this time, WKWK was a Top 40 outlet, complete with "Good Guys" disc jockeys and a large teenage listening audience.

Community Service Broadcasting, owned by the Glassman family of Illinois, acquired the WKWK stations in 1975. It attempted to sell its Wheeling operation to Price Communications Corporation in 1981, but the deal fell apart, and Price ultimately bought WWVA and WCPI (98.7 FM) in late 1982. Meanwhile, the station was shifting to target an older audience. It adopted the Music of Your Life syndicated adult standards format in 1982.

Community Service sold all of its stations—including WKWK-AM-FM—in 1986 to CR Broadcasting, a partnership of two men from Virginia and Maryland. WKWK switched to an oldies format the following year. The entire CR portfolio was repurchased by the Glassman family in 1992.

Wheeling radio would be hit by successive rounds of change in the late 1990s as deregulation led to rapid industry consolidation. Osborn Communications Corporation acquired the WKWK stations from the Glassmans in February 1996, paying $2.75 million. In April 1996, WKWK, having by this point become a sports talk station, became WBBD after dropping most of its sports programming to return to standards; the WBBD call letters had previously been on 1600 kHz until 1995, when that station became Radio AAHS affiliate WOHZ. Three months later, Osborn and its 17 radio stations were purchased by Capstar Broadcasting Partners in a $100 million transaction; by this time, the Wheeling cluster of stations had grown to six. Capstar merged with Chancellor Media, which renamed itself AMFM, Inc., in the summer of 1999, then merged into Clear Channel Communications in a deal that closed in 2000.

The station's "Real Oldies" format was dropped in 2012, when WBBD became an affiliate of the 24/7 Comedy Network as part of a 12-station flip of mostly AM stations in various markets. This lasted until June 2014, when the station adopted its current sports format. The comedy format had been a failure in the local ratings, registering a zero share among listeners 12 and up in the fall 2013 Nielsen report.

== Taking over for WWVA ==
On August 4, 2010, a downburst event generating strong winds pushed through the Wheeling area, knocking the three–tower array used by WWVA, located in nearby St. Clairsville, Ohio, to the ground. The station was knocked completely off the air; in the immediate wake of the storm, WBBD was pressed into service to carry all of WWVA's programming. On August 5, 2010, at 10:30 p.m., WWVA began to broadcast from a temporary facility, allowing WBBD to resume its existing programming. Similarly, in 2000, WBBD was used as a temporary substitute for WWVA during tower work.

== Programming ==
WBBD is an affiliate of the Pittsburgh Pirates Radio Network.

== FM translator ==
WBBD rebroadcasts its signal to the following low-power FM translator:

Call sign	Frequency	City of license	FID	ERP (W)	HAAT	Class	Transmitter coordinates	FCC info
W280EW	103.9 FM	Wheeling, West Virginia	140908	250	99 m (325 ft)	D	40°03′41″N 80°45′07″W	LMS
