= WETZ =

- New Martinsville, West Virginia; United States
- Broadcast area: New Martinsville, West Virginia; Western Wetzel County, West Virginia; Eastern Monroe County, Ohio
- Frequency: 1330 kHz
- Branding: The Legend WETZ

Programming
- Format: Classic hits
- Affiliations: ABC Radio's Classic Hits Network; West Virginia MetroNews

Ownership
- Owner: Dailey Corporation
- Sister stations: WYMJ

History
- First air date: 1953
- Call sign meaning: WETZel

Technical information
- Licensing authority: FCC
- Facility ID: 26514
- Class: D
- Power: 1,000 watts daytime 59 watts nighttime
- Transmitter coordinates: 39°39′27.0″N 80°51′34.0″W
- Translators: 93.1 W226BE (New Martinsville); 104.5 W283DH (New Martinsville)

Links
- Public license information: Public file; LMS

WETZ (1330 AM) is a classic hits formatted broadcast radio station licensed to New Martinsville, West Virginia, serving New Martinsville, Western Wetzel County, West Virginia and Eastern Monroe County, Ohio. WETZ is owned and operated by Dailey Corporation. On the FM dial, WETZ can be heard on 93.1 and 104.5.

On Monday, April 5, 2021, WETZ changed its format from classic hits to classic rock. After nearly a year of running the classic rock format WETZ reverted to a classic hits station.
