= WKWK-FM =

- Wheeling, West Virginia; United States
- Broadcast area: Wheeling metro area
- Frequency: 97.3 MHz
- Branding: Mix 97-3

Programming
- Language: English
- Format: Adult contemporary
- Affiliations: Premiere Networks; Wheeling Nailers Broadcast Network

Ownership
- Owner: iHeartMedia, Inc.; (iHM Licenses, LLC)
- Sister stations: WBBD; WEGW; WOVK; WVKF; WWVA

History
- First air date: 1948; 78 years ago
- Former call signs: WEEL-FM (1987–1990)

Technical information
- Licensing authority: FCC
- Facility ID: 73193
- Class: B
- ERP: 50,000 watts
- HAAT: 128 meters (420 ft)
- Transmitter coordinates: 40°5′49.0″N 80°42′6.0″W

Links
- Public license information: Public file; LMS
- Webcast: Listen live (via iHeartRadio)
- Website: mix973wheeling.iheart.com

WKWK-FM (97.3 MHz) is an adult contemporary formatted broadcast radio station licensed to Wheeling, West Virginia, and serving the Wheeling–Steubenville area. WKWK is owned and operated by iHeartMedia, Inc. The station carries Murphy, Sam and Jodi and Delilah from Premiere Networks. WKWK-FM is also the flagship broadcast station of the Wheeling Nailers ECHL ice hockey team, with all games broadcast.
