= WJAW-FM =

- McConnelsville, Ohio; United States
- Broadcast area: Marietta/Athens, Ohio
- Frequency: 100.9 MHz
- Branding: Jaws Country 100.9

Programming
- Format: Country
- Affiliations: ABC News Radio

Ownership
- Owner: Jawco, Inc.
- Sister stations: WMOA, WJAW

History
- First air date: 1990
- Call sign meaning: owner John A. Wharff, III

Technical information
- Licensing authority: FCC
- Facility ID: 54264
- Class: A
- ERP: 1,900 watts
- HAAT: 176 meters (577 ft)
- Transmitter coordinates: 39°33′24″N 81°51′06″W

Links
- Public license information: Public file; LMS
- Webcast: Listen live
- Website: wmoa1490.com

WJAW-FM (100.9 MHz) is a radio station broadcasting a country music format. Licensed to McConnelsville, Ohio, United States. The station is currently owned by Jawco Inc.
