= WVKF =

- Shadyside, Ohio; United States
- Broadcast area: Wheeling metropolitan area
- Frequency: 95.7 MHz
- Branding: Kiss 95-7

Programming
- Language: English
- Format: Contemporary hit radio
- Affiliations: Premiere Networks

Ownership
- Owner: iHeartMedia, Inc.; (iHM Licenses, LLC)
- Sister stations: WBBD; WEGW; WKWK-FM; WOVK; WWVA

History
- First air date: 1988; 38 years ago
- Former call signs: WBJY (1988–90); WEEL (1990–2004)
- Call sign meaning: West Virginia's Kiss FM

Technical information
- Licensing authority: FCC
- Facility ID: 50150
- Class: B1
- ERP: 6,800 watts
- HAAT: 191.0 meters (626.6 ft)
- Transmitter coordinates: 40°3′41.00″N 80°45′9.00″W

Links
- Public license information: Public file; LMS
- Webcast: Listen live (via iHeartRadio)
- Website: kisswheeling.iheart.com

WVKF (95.7 FM, "Kiss 95.7") is a radio station broadcasting a contemporary hit radio format. Licensed to Shadyside, Ohio, United States, the station serves the Wheeling, West Virginia, area. The station is owned by iHeartMedia, Inc.

== History ==
former logo

WVKF began its life on 105.5 as "The Zone" in 2000 under the calls of WZNW, with a similar format but without the hip-hop music that had become dominate once the banner was changed to "Kiss-FM". Once Clear Channel took over the station, its format shifted to play, in addition to the current format, the R&B and hip-hop tracks. This, along with its main competitor in the market at the time, 100.5 WOMP-FM, being reluctant to play the Top 40 hits that Kiss was willing to play (due to WOMP's demographic being slightly older than WVKF's was), KISS developed the moniker "All of today's best music, not just some of it", which it still uses today.

Once WVKF eclipsed WOMP in the ratings, some of the image promotions that ran on the station began to get more cocky about its position, at times running promos wanting for their listeners to call WOMP's phone number and tell them that their ratings were dropping. This tactic only lasted about a month, but despite that, WVKF's ratings surge continued. It was also during this time that Rick Dees Weekly Top 40, which was on WOMP before, switched to WVKF.

Once WOMP-FM folded and changed formats and call letters, WVKF became the only Top 40 station in the market. However, about three months after the victory, the station's frequency was changed suddenly to 95.7 (the former frequency of WEEL-FM), while oldies radio format WUKL took over the 105.5 frequency.

As of 2022, the station features Premiere Networks’ Elvis Duran and the Morning Show and On-Air With Ryan Seacrest in mornings and middays, respectively. Most Requested Live and American Top 40, also from Premiere, air on weekends. Programming at most other hours comes from iHeartMedia's syndicated “Hit Nation” feed. OVAC high school football is also aired seasonally on Friday nights.
