= WEGW =

- Wheeling, West Virginia; United States
- Broadcast area: West Virginia Panhandle
- Frequency: 107.5 MHz
- Branding: Eagle 107.5

Programming
- Language: English
- Format: Classic rock
- Affiliations: Premiere Networks

Ownership
- Owner: iHeartMedia, Inc.; (iHM Licenses, LLC)
- Sister stations: WBBD; WKWK-FM; WOVK; WVKF; WWVA

History
- First air date: October 1965
- Former call signs: WTRF-FM (1965–1972); WTRF (1972–1984); WZMM (1984–1987); WZMM-FM (1987–1989)
- Call sign meaning: Eagle Wheeling

Technical information
- Licensing authority: FCC
- Facility ID: 72173
- Class: B
- ERP: 16,000 watts
- HAAT: 269 meters (883 ft)
- Transmitter coordinates: 40°3′41.0″N 80°45′9.0″W

Links
- Public license information: Public file; LMS
- Webcast: Listen live (via iHeartRadio)
- Website: eagle1075.iheart.com

WEGW (107.5 FM, "Eagle 107.5") is a commercial radio station licensed to Wheeling, West Virginia, United States, and serving the West Virginia Panhandle and parts of Ohio and Pennsylvania. It has a classic rock format and is owned and operated by iHeartMedia, Inc., with studios at the Capitol Theatre in downtown Wheeling.

WEGW's transmitter is sited on Kirkwood Heights Road in Bridgeport, Ohio. The station is the Wheeling/Steubenville area affiliate of the Pittsburgh Steelers Radio Network and Pittsburgh Penguins Radio Network.

== History ==
The station signed on in October 1965 as WTRF-FM. It was a network affiliate of the Mutual Broadcasting System and played a variety of musical styles in its early days.

In 1984, it changed its call letters to WZMM and in 1989, it switched to its current call sign, WEGW.
