= WCDK =

Radio station in Cadiz, Ohio

- Cadiz, Ohio; United States
- Broadcast area: Steubenville, Ohio; Wheeling, West Virginia
- Frequency: 106.3 MHz
- Branding: 106.3 The River

Programming
- Format: Classic rock
- Affiliations: Ohio State Sports Network

Ownership
- Owner: Cody Barack; (Ohio Midland Newsgroup, LLC)
- Sister stations: WEIR, WRQY, WOMP, WBGI-FM, WLYV, WOHI

History
- First air date: August 17, 1990 (as WFNN)
- Former call signs: WFNN (1990); WWYS (1990–1993)

Technical information
- Licensing authority: FCC
- Facility ID: 40874
- Class: A
- ERP: 2,700 watts
- HAAT: 151 meters (495 ft)
- Transmitter coordinates: 40°15′14.00″N 80°50′35.00″W

Links
- Public license information: Public file; LMS
- Website: 1063theriver.com

WCDK (106.3 FM) is a radio station licensed to Cadiz, Ohio, United States, the station serves the Steubenville, Ohio and Wheeling, West Virginia, area. The station is currently owned by Cody Barack, through licensee Ohio Midland Newsgroup, LLC. WCDK broadcasts a classic rock music radio format.

WCDK broadcasts from facilities along Ohio Route 150 in Dillonvale, Ohio. It is the flagship station for Steubenville High School football.

== History ==
The roots of this station date back to March 17, 1980, when the construction permit was first applied for. The application was granted on May 23, 1983 to Cadiz Broadcasting, Inc., a company headed by Randall M. O'Grady. However, the station would not sign on the air under this company's ownership, largely due to its inability to acquire a suitable tower site from which to broadcast.

The station went on the air as WFNN on 1990-08-17. On 1990-10-08, the station changed its call sign to WWYS. On 1993-09-01 to the current WCDK,

On August 2, 2017 Priority Communications of Ohio filed an application with the FCC to sell WEIR and WCDK to Ohio Midland Newsgroup, LLC of Bellaire, Ohio. The company is headed by Cody Barack and had no other broadcast interests. The sale was consummated on October 31, 2017 at a price of $700,000.
