= WOMP (FM) =

Radio station in Bellaire, Ohio

Coordinates: 40.036°N 80.771°W

- Bellaire, Ohio; United States
- Broadcast area: Wheeling, West Virginia; Steubenville, Ohio
- Frequency: 100.5 MHz
- Branding: 100.5 WOMP-FM

Programming
- Format: Classic hits

Ownership
- Owner: Cody Barack; (Ohio Midland Newsgroup, LLC)
- Sister stations: WCDK; WLYV; WRQY; WBGI-FM; WEIR; WOHI

History
- First air date: December 2, 1947 (as WTRF-FM)
- Former call signs: WTRF-FM (1947–1955); WTRX-FM (1955–1959); WOMP-FM (1959–2005); WYJK-FM (2005–2012); WBGI-FM (2012–2021); WUKL (2021–2023)

Technical information
- Licensing authority: FCC
- Facility ID: 3039
- Class: B
- ERP: 48,000 watts
- HAAT: 152 meters (499 ft)

Links
- Public license information: Public file; LMS
- Webcast: Listen live
- Website: rivernetworkradio.com

WOMP (100.5 FM) is a radio station broadcasting a classic hits format. Licensed to Bellaire, Ohio, United States, it serves the Wheeling, West Virginia, area. The station is owned by Cody Barack through licensee Ohio Midland Newsgroup, LLC and transmits from studio facilities in Bellaire.

== History ==
=== WTRF-FM, WTRX-FM and WOMP-FM ===
This station began as WTRF-FM at a time when many applicants for new AM radio stations were also issued FM licenses. Thus, WTRF (1290 AM) and WTRF-FM went on the air at around the same time, but in FM's halcyon years, no profit would be realized until years later. The FM simulcast its AM sister station for many years, primarily using the FM station as a vehicle for providing local radio service after the AM was mandated to shut down after sunset.

These stations operated for many years as co-owned affiliates of local television station WTRF-TV, then an NBC, and since 1980 a CBS affiliate for the Wheeling and Steubenville television market. Though the radio stations went on the air first, they prospered under this relationship with the television station. (WTRF-AM-FM became WTRX-AM-FM on January 1, 1955, and WOMP-AM-FM on February 28, 1959.) The radio stations were sold off to new owners in the late 1970s.

At around this time, programming was separated between the two stations, with WOMP-FM (the station's branding was a phonetic sound of the call letters) taking on a more Top 40/CHR role, becoming a neck-and-neck competitor with like-formatted then-competitor WKWK in Wheeling, WZMM in Wheeling, and WRKY "Rocky 103" in Steubenville soon after WKWK changed its format.

=== In the news: station silenced ===
WOMP-AM-FM had fallen into financial difficulty at around 1990, forcing the station into receivership in 1992. The station's studios and offices were consumed in a fire later that year, forcing the station to broadcast from a trailer near its transmitter site after a brief period off the air. The station was then acquired by its current owner as part of a duopoly transaction with WRKY and its AM sister station WSTV. WOMP-FM simulcast WRKY outside of morning drive, but resumed full independent programming after studio issues were resolved.

=== As WYJK-FM ===
In the fall of 2005, both WOMP-AM-FM underwent format changes. WOMP (AM) and its simulcast sister, WSTV began an affiliation with the ESPN Radio network after years as a talk station. WOMP-FM's longtime legendary call letters were switched to WYJK-FM, and the station adopted an adult hits format under the "Jack FM" brand.

The WYJK call letters were also being used for a co-owned sister AM station in Connellsville, Pennsylvania (later known as WBGI). Though the call letters were similar, the same-named AM station never adopted its own variety hits format nor did it simulcast this station. The call letters on that station were switched from WPNT (but was known for years as WCVI, going bankrupt in 2001 and subsequently sold) shortly before its owners closed the station with a dark license in the fall of 2006, citing technical repairs.

=== Frequency swap with WBGI-FM ===
On September 10, 2012, WYJK-FM's "Jack FM" format moved to 96.5 FM in Moundsville, West Virginia, swapping frequencies with country-formatted WBGI-FM (now WRQY under the Rage 96.5 banner and an active rock format), which moved to the 100.5 FM frequency. On September 18, 2012, the stations changed call signs.

=== Sale to Ohio Midland Newsgroup; return of WOMP-FM ===
On August 12, 2021, WBGI-FM, along with WUKL, WLIE, and WRQY, were sold by Forever Media to Cody Barack's Ohio Midland Newsgroup for $1,225,000. Then, on December 28, 2021, it was announced that WBGI-FM would swap frequencies with WUKL, on January 3, 2022, at 5:30 a.m. WBGI-FM's country format moved to the 105.5 frequency, while WUKL's classic hits format moved to 100.5 and revived the "WOMP-FM" branding that had been dropped in 2005. To prepare for the swap, both stations had swapped call signs on December 24, 2021.

At the time of the relaunch, WOMP-LP, a community radio station in Cambridge, Ohio, had not granted Ohio Midland Newsgroup permission to use WOMP as a call sign. WOMP-LP's owner, Buckeye Broadcasting, would grant this consent on October 6, 2022; on October 11, WUKL filed a request to change to WOMP effective October 20. The change would ultimately take effect on January 6, 2023.
