= WBGI-FM =

Radio station in Bethlehem, West Virginia

- Bethlehem, West Virginia; United States
- Broadcast area: Wheeling metropolitan area
- Frequency: 105.5 MHz
- Branding: Big Willie 105.5

Programming
- Format: Country music
- Affiliations: Fox News Radio

Ownership
- Owner: Cody Barack; (Ohio Midland Newsgroup, LLC)
- Sister stations: WOMP, WLYV, WRQY, WEIR, WCDK

History
- First air date: 1985
- Former call signs: WHLX (1982–1996); WRIR (1996–1997); WZNW (1997–2001); WZNW-FM (2001); WVKF (2001–2004); WUKL (2004–2021)
- Call sign meaning: "Biggie"

Technical information
- Licensing authority: FCC
- Facility ID: 4996
- Class: B1
- ERP: 13,500 watts
- HAAT: 95 meters (312 ft)
- Transmitter coordinates: 40°03′17″N 80°42′26″W

Links
- Public license information: Public file; LMS
- Webcast: Listen live

WBGI-FM (105.5 FM) is a commercial radio station licensed to Bethlehem, West Virginia, United States, and serving the Wheeling metropolitan area. WBGI-FM is owned by Cody Barack through licensee Ohio Midland Newsgroup LLC, and carries a country music format.

WBGI-FM's transmitter is sited on Highland Lane in Bethlehem, near Interstate 470.

== History ==
The station first signed on the air in 1985. Its original call sign was WHLX.

In 1997, WHLX was flipped to a Modern AC—WZNE—THE ZONE, a Hit based Alternative Pop station programmed by Doug Daniels. The station then transitioned to a Mainstream CHR in 1998.

Beginning in 2001, the station changed call letters to WVKF and become KISS FM remaining CHR. But the CHR/Top 40 format moved to 95.7 in 2004. After Kiss-FM moved, 105.5 flipped to Classic Hits as "Kool 105.5" under the WUKL call sign.

On August 12, 2021, the station cluster was sold by Forever Media to Cody Barack's Ohio Midland Newsgroup, LLC. The properties included WBGI-FM, WLIE (now WLYV), and WRQY. The price tag was $1,250,000 along with the sale of FM translator W235BX.

On December 28, 2021, Ohio Midland Newsgroup announced that WUKL and WBGI-FM would swap formats on January 3, 2022, at 5:30 a.m. The switch put the classic hits format on 100.5 as a revived "WOMP-FM”, and the country format on 105.5 as "105.5 Biggie Country", with both stations exchanging call signs before the announcement on December 24, 2021.

On September 22, 2022, after stunting with a one day loop of "Achy Breaky Heart" by Billy Ray Cyrus, WBGI-FM changed its format to classic country as "Big Willie 105.5", positioned as "The Greatest Country Hits of the 80s, 90s & More". In early 2025, the station playlist was tweaked to add more current music while retaining the Big Willie branding. The station is now positioned as “Your Country.”

In addition to its primary country format, WBGI airs a local talk program hosted by Dimitri Vassilaros on weekday mornings, Indian Creek High School football, and Nascar coverage.
