= WLYV =

Talk station in Bellaire, Ohio

Simulcast of WEIR Weirton, WV
- Bellaire, Ohio; United States
- Broadcast area: Wheeling, West Virginia
- Frequency: 1290 kHz
- Branding: River Talk

Programming
- Format: News/talk/sports/oldies

Ownership
- Owner: Cody Barack; (Ohio Midland Newsgroup, LLC)
- Sister stations: WBGI-FM; WRQY; WOMP; WEIR; WCDK

History
- First air date: 1947 (as WTRF)
- Former call signs: WTRF (1947–1954); WTRX (1955–1959); WOMP (1959–2017); WLEJ (2017); WYLY (2017–2019); WLIE (2019–2021)
- Call sign meaning: Live

Technical information
- Licensing authority: FCC
- Facility ID: 3038
- Class: D
- Power: 1,000 watts day; 33 watts night
- Transmitter coordinates: 40°2′9.3″N 80°46′15.3″W
- Translator: 100.1 W261DH (Wheeling)

Links
- Public license information: Public file; LMS
- Webcast: Listen Live
- Website: 1063theriver.com

WLYV (1290 AM) is a radio station broadcasting a news/talk/sports/oldies format. Licensed to Bellaire, Ohio, United States, it serves the Wheeling area. The station is owned by Cody Barack, through licensee Ohio Midland Newsgroup, LLC.

Originally known as WTRF, the station signed on the air for the first time in 1947 on both the AM and FM bands. Fittingly, the call sign stood for "Two Radio Frequencies". It became WTRX in 1955 and then WOMP in 1959.

On June 5, 2017, WOMP changed their format from sports to classic country, branded as "Lejends 100.1/1290" (simulcast on FM translator W261DH 100.1 FM Wheeling, West Virginia). The station changed its call sign to WLEJ on June 12, 2017. The station changed its call sign and branding again on September 8, 2017, to WYLY, "Willie 100.1/1290". When the WLIE call letters became available, WYLY used them and changed to WLIE on January 1, 2019.

On October 31, 2021, Forever Media consummated the sale of WLIE, three sister stations, and a translator to Ohio Midland Newsgroup, LLC for $1,300,000. On November 15, 2021, WLIE changed its format from classic country to a simulcast of conservative and local talk formatted WEIR 1430 AM Weirton, West Virginia, branded as "River Talk". It changed its callsign to WLYV on November 23, 2021 with its own live and local content. In addition to its primary talk format, the station airs OVAC high school football, Ohio State athletics, and an automated oldies format (branded as Good Time Oldies) on weeknights and weekends.
