= WJAW (AM) =

- St. Marys, West Virginia; United States
- Broadcast area: Mid-Ohio Valley
- Frequency: 630 kHz
- Branding: Mid-Ohio Valley's ESPN Radio

Programming
- Format: Sports
- Affiliations: ESPN Radio

Ownership
- Owner: JAWCO, Inc.
- Sister stations: WJAW-FM, WMOA

History
- First air date: October 1984
- Former call signs: WVVW (1984–2001)
- Call sign meaning: Owner John A. Wharff, III

Technical information
- Licensing authority: FCC
- Facility ID: 59716
- Class: D
- Power: 1,000 watts (day); 37 watts (night)
- Transmitter coordinates: 39°23′42.0″N 81°13′49.0″W
- Translator: 92.9 W225CW (Parkersburg)

Links
- Public license information: Public file; LMS
- Webcast: Listen live
- Website: wmoa1490.com

WJAW (630 AM) is a sports formatted radio station licensed to St. Marys, West Virginia, United States, serving the Mid-Ohio Valley. WJAW is owned by JAWCO, Inc.
