= WRQY =

Radio station in Moundsville, West Virginia

- Moundsville, West Virginia; United States
- Broadcast area: Wheeling, West Virginia; St. Clairsville, Ohio
- Frequency: 96.5 MHz
- Branding: Rage 96.5

Programming
- Format: Active rock
- Affiliations: Fox News Radio

Ownership
- Owner: Cody Barack; (Ohio Midland Newsgroup, LLC)
- Sister stations: WCDK, WLYV, WOMP, WBGI-FM, WEIR

History
- First air date: 1990 (as WRKP)
- Former call signs: WRKP (1988–2007); WLVW (2007–2011); WBGI-FM (2011–2012); WYJK-FM (2012–2014)
- Call sign meaning: Sounds like "Rocky" (previous branding and format)

Technical information
- Licensing authority: FCC
- Facility ID: 56641
- Class: A
- ERP: 2,500 watts
- HAAT: 138 meters
- Transmitter coordinates: 40°2′9.0″N 80°46′16.0″W

Links
- Public license information: Public file; LMS
- Webcast: Listen Live
- Website: rivernetworkov.com

WRQY (96.5 FM) is an active rock formatted broadcast radio station licensed to Moundsville, West Virginia, serving Wheeling in West Virginia and St. Clairsville in Ohio. WRQY is owned and operated by Cody Barack through licensee Ohio Midland Newsgroup.

== History ==
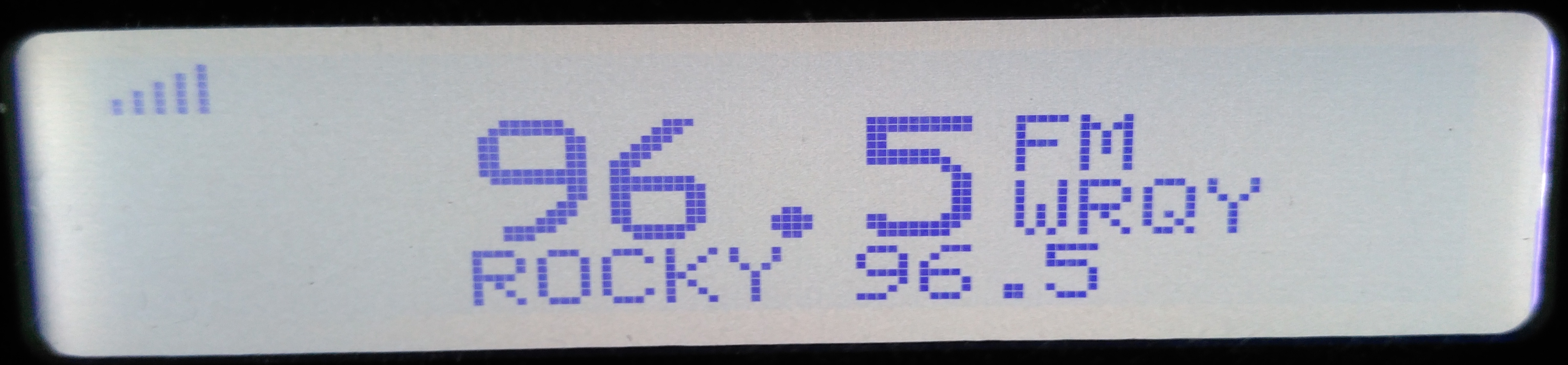
WRQY on a SPARC HD Radio with RDS.

On December 20, 2011, the then-WBGI-FM dropped the "K-Love" contemporary Christian format and began stunting. On December 27, 2011, WBGI-FM flipped to country, branded as "Biggie 96.5".

On September 10, 2012, WBGI-FM's country format moved to 100.5 FM in Bellaire, Ohio, swapping formats with "Jack FM" WYJK-FM, which moved to the 96.5 FM frequency. On September 18, 2012, the stations swapped call signs, with WBGI-FM changing to WYJK-FM and vice versa.

On September 8, 2014, WYJK-FM flipped to a hybrid sports/active rock format, branded as "Rocky 96.5"; the station also changed call letters to WRQY.

Final logo as "Rocky 96.5"

On March 26, 2018, WRQY flipped to classic rock, still under the "Rocky 96.5" branding. The station's format WAs fed via Westwood One's "Classic Rock X" network, which was developed in consultation with Forever Media and debuted on WRQY.

On November 12, 2021, WRQY's Facebook page posted a picture of their logo with the "classic" word crossed out with the text "Monday at 3". On November 15, WRQY dumped westwood one programming and went back to active rock and was rebranded as "Rage 96.5" by Cody Barack. Citing, "the Wheeling market needs a real rock station". The final song played before the switch was "Mysterious Ways" by U2. The first song that was played once the flip took place was "Darkness Settles In" by Five Finger Death Punch.
