= Jamboree in the Hills =

Country music festival near Wheeling, West Virginia

Jamboree in The Hills
- Genre: Country
- Dates: 3rd week of July (Thursday-Sunday)
- Locations: Brush Run Park, St. Clairsville, Ohio (1977-89); The Barn Stage, Plainfield, Belmont County, Ohio (1990-2018)
- Years active: 1977-2018
- Founders: Freddy Carr; F. Glen Reeves
- Attendance: est. 200,000 annually
- Website: Festival Website

Jamboree in the Hills was an annual festival of country music in Morristown, Ohio (about 1 1/2 hours west of Pittsburgh, and 20 minutes west of Wheeling, West Virginia) in Belmont County, Ohio, until Live Nation officially canceled it on November 7, 2018. The concert, owned by Live Nation, showcased a wide variety of new, veteran, and legendary musicians.

In November 2018, Live Nation announced that the Jamboree in the Hills would be going on hiatus and would not take place in 2019 as it began negotiations regarding the event's future. Local officials in Belmont County noted that the site was atypical of Live Nation's other concerts and that the event's BYOB policy deprived Live Nation of a major source of revenue. Live Nation had attempted to end the BYOB policy for the 2017 event, which was to be renamed "Jambo Country," but fan backlash led to the reversal of the decision and renaming within days of its announcement.

In 2025, the nonprofit Wheeling Jamboree announced the return of an outdoor, festival seating concert to be held at The Highlands in Triadelphia, West Virginia, in September. The event is billed as Jamboree USA and has no ties to Live Nation.
