= WEIR =

Radio station in Weirton, West Virginia, US

- Weirton, West Virginia; United States
- Broadcast area: Weirton, West Virginia; Steubenville, Ohio
- Frequency: 1430 kHz
- Branding: River Talk 100.9FM 1430

Programming
- Format: News/talk/sports
- Affiliations: Salem Broadcasting

Ownership
- Owner: Cody Barack; (Ohio Midland Newsgroup, LLC)
- Sister stations: WCDK; WOMP; WLYV; WRQY; WBGI-FM

History
- First air date: 1950
- Call sign meaning: Weirton

Technical information
- Licensing authority: FCC
- Facility ID: 40873
- Class: B
- Power: 1,000 watts day and night
- Transmitter coordinates: 40°26′42.2″N 80°37′40.3″W
- Translator: 100.9 W265ED (Weirton) ({{{3}}})
- Repeater: 1290 WLYV (Bellaire, Ohio)

Links
- Public license information: Public file; LMS
- Webcast: Listen live
- Website: www.1063theriver.com

WEIR is a news/talk/sports formatted broadcast radio station licensed to Weirton, West Virginia, serving the Weirton/Steubenville area. WEIR is owned and operated by Cody Barack, through licensee Ohio Midland Newsgroup, LLC known River Talk North with WLYV 1290 100.1 being River Talk South covering Bellaire/Wheeling.

The station broadcasts from transmitter facilities located along Ohio State Route 428 in Island Creek Township, Ohio.

== History ==
WEIR first went on the air on September 15, 1950, doing business as The Tri-State Broadcasting Company, maintaining studios and offices at 243 North Fourth Street in downtown Steubenville, Ohio. Thomas Millsop served as company president, and Paul White was the general manager.

By the mid-1960s, studios had moved from North Fourth Street in Steubenville to 3992 Main Street in Weirton, but maintained the same ownership. On October 17, 1968, WEIR was sold to 1430 Corp., a company headed by Mone Anatha, Jr. William Greaver was General Manager. Studios were re-located to 3578 Pennsylvania Avenue in Weirton.

In August 1976, WEIR was sold to Gilcom Corporation, a company headed by Edward T. Giller. John Rambo was named station manager. In January 1985, WEIR was sold again, this time to Weir Radio Corp., headed by Don DeVorris.

In December 1989, WEIR was sold to McGraw Broadcasting Corporation, a division of McGraw Group Stations. The company was headed by Richard McGraw and Karen McGraw. A few years after this transaction, WEIR was joined by an FM sister station, WCDK, licensed to Cadiz, Ohio. This relationship continues today. Studios were relocated to 878 Bantam Ridge Road in Wintersville, Ohio.

On December 4, 1998, both WEIR and WCDK were sold to Priority Communications, a company headed by Jay Phillipone. Studios were moved to 2307 Pennsylvania Avenue in Weirton, West Virginia.

On August 2, 2017, Priority Communications of Ohio filed an application with the FCC to sell WEIR and WCDK to Ohio Midland Newsgroup, LLC of Bellaire, Ohio. The company is headed by Cody Barack and had no other broadcast interests. The sale was consummated on October 31, 2017 at a price of $750,000. Barack changed the WCDK format from classic hits to classic rock and changed WEIR format from sports to conservative and local talk. Studios were relocated during covid to the Fort Steuben Mall in Steubenville Ohio.
