= WBGI (AM) =

Radio station in Connellsville, Pennsylvania

- Connellsville, Pennsylvania; United States
- Broadcast area: Fayette County; Pittsburgh (limited)
- Frequency: 1340 kHz

Ownership
- Owner: Keymarket Communications, Inc.

History
- First air date: April 23, 1947; 79 years ago
- Last air date: June 14, 2012; 13 years ago
- Former call signs: WCVI (1947–99); DWCVI (1999); WCVI (1999–2001); WPNT (2001–05); WYJK (2005–11)

Technical information
- Facility ID: 39859
- Class: C
- Power: 1,000 watts (unlimited)
- Transmitter coordinates: 40°01′27″N 79°36′35″W

WBGI (1340 AM) was an American radio station licensed to serve the community of Connellsville, Pennsylvania, approximately 40 miles (64 km) southeast of Pittsburgh. The station was last owned by Keymarket Communications, which also held the final broadcast license. Long known as WCVI, WBGI fell silent after several years of simulcasting sister station WPKL in Uniontown, Pennsylvania, which aired, and continues to air, a classic hits radio format. Its license was cancelled on July 19, 2012.

== History ==
=== Early years ===
First coming on the air in 1947, WCVI was a typical radio station of its time, boasting a middle-of-the-road music format with local talk and sports broadcasts, serving Western Pennsylvania's fabled "Fay-West" area (southern Westermoreland and northern Fayette Counties. Over the years, WCVI became one of the top stations in Western Pennsylvania, and best known for fostering the careers of local sportscaster legends Kevin Harrison and Jack Benedict.

WCVI was first owned by Connellsville Broadcasters, Inc., a company headed by J. Wylie Driscoll, who served as president, general manager, and commercial manager. The station broadcast from studios and offices at 126 West Crawford Avenue, and operated with a daytime power output of 1,000 watts, and at 250 watts at night.

On June 28, 1951, the owner principals of WCVI changed, though the name of the licensee remained the same, with a local physician, Dr. Cam T. "Doc" Troilo assuming control of the station from Raymond Galiardi by 1955. By that time, the station briefly relocated to the Hetzel Building, and then finally up the street from its original location to an 18th-century historic building at 133 East Crawford Avenue in Connellsville, where it would operate from for the rest of the 20th century.

In 1985, Troilo sold the station to Mar Com Broadcasting, owned by Marlene Hesler of Monroeville. Two years later, an FM sister station joined WCVI into the fold. WPQR (now WPKL), a station licensed to Uniontown, had been acquired that year by Pittsburgh attorney Geoffrey P. Kelly, doing business as Kel Com Broadcasting. Though the licenses of the two stations were separately owned, both Heshler and Kelly were able to make a partnership work, doing business as Mar Kel Partners, Limited, reducing expenses through shared employee functions. After Kelly acquired WPQR, he moved the on-air operations of his station to the WCVI building, but maintained a satellite sales office in downtown Uniontown.

=== Partnership dissolved ===
The partnership between Heshler and Kelly was eventually dissolved, with Heshler resigning her partnership in the stations by 1994, with Kelly acquiring the assets of WCVI, though Heshler stayed on as general manager for a year or two after its dissolution. Unfortunately, both stations fell on hard times throughout the 1990s, reducing the staffs of both stations to a skeleton crew, and WPQR being silent for almost a year due to a broken transmitter component and no money to fix it, further complicated by a dispute with the landlord who owned the property where WPQR's tower stood. The remaining staff, however, remained loyal to the station and stayed on, some even working for free as volunteers. WCVI missed the deadline to submit a renewal application to the FCC in early 1999, causing the license to temporarily be deleted (FCC records list the station as DWCVI from May 6 to August 9, 1999) and wound up operating under temporary authorization pending an appeal.

Eventually this began to take its toll; by early 2000, WCVI only had two paid employees by early 2000, the station manager (who doubled as a full-time supply sergeant at Connellsville's National Guard armory) and a part-timer who served as the station manager, disc jockey, secretary and ad saleswoman. The ABC affiliation lapsed and WCVI took Al Ham's Music Of Your Life format full-time outside of the morning and midday shows. The station's previous studios on the second and third floors at 133 East Crawford Avenue were vacated for a small storefront on the first floor that eventually had the heat turned off; evidence began to mount of the deteriorating condition of both the station and the building that housed it.

Creditors forced WCVI and WPQR into receivership in August 2000 after they reportedly racked up more than $1.5 million in debts; both stations were finally sold in a bankruptcy bid sale that November for $475,000 to Keymarket Communications.

=== Bankruptcy sale ===
WCVI also went silent in June 2001 after it and WPQR were acquired for $475,000 by Keymarket Communications of Carnegie in a January bankruptcy court sale, to satisfy more than a million dollars in debt incurred by Mar Com and Kel Com. After undergoing an extensive technical overhaul, WPQR finally returned to the air under the new call letters WPKL (99.3 The Pickle) and an oldies format. WCVI also returned to the air under the call letters WPNT, but only as a simulcast of its FM sister. The station changed its call sign to WYJK, but still had no independent programming of its own. A co-owned FM sister station licensed to Bellaire, Ohio, is known as WRQY, playing a variety hits format.

According to the Federal Communications Commission (FCC), Keymarket Communications applied for special temporary authority on WYJK's behalf in November for a silent station, with reasons given as being technical in nature. Reporting silence since November 6, the FCC approved the request November 29, 2006.

WYJK remained off the air for a period of more than two and a half years, returning to the air in August 2008. However, WYJK continued to simulcast FM sister station WPKL, and no plans were announced for it to develop independent programming of its own. On September 15, 2011, the station changed its call sign to WBGI.

=== Cancellation ===
On June 14, 2012, WBGI went silent for the final time. Keymarket surrendered the station's license to the FCC on June 21, 2012. The FCC cancelled the license and deleted the WBGI call sign from its database on July 19, 2012. The historic East Crawford Avenue building was sold to a new owner in 2005, after years of local hearings concerning its ownership liability.

== Sources ==
- Daily Courier: WCVI Building Owner to Pay
- Daily Courier: WCVI Building Owner Fined
- Tribune Review: Former radio building owner fined after violating city's building codes
- Daily Courier: Time running out for owner of WCVI building
- Daily Courier: WCVI building brought up to code
- Vacant WCVI Building Fine-tuned for Rebirth
- WCVI Building Found Unsafe for Occupancy
- 1949 Broadcasting Yearbook
- 1953 Broadcasting Yearbook
- 1959 Broadcasting Yearbook
- 1963 Broadcasting Yearbook
- 1965 Broadcasting Yearbook
- 1967 Broadcasting Yearbook
- 1971 Broadcasting Yearbook
- 1975 Broadcasting Yearbook
- 1978 Broadcasting Yearbook
- 1981 Broadcasting Yearbook
