= Rockton, Pennsylvania =

Unincorporated community in Pennsylvania, US

- Unincorporated community
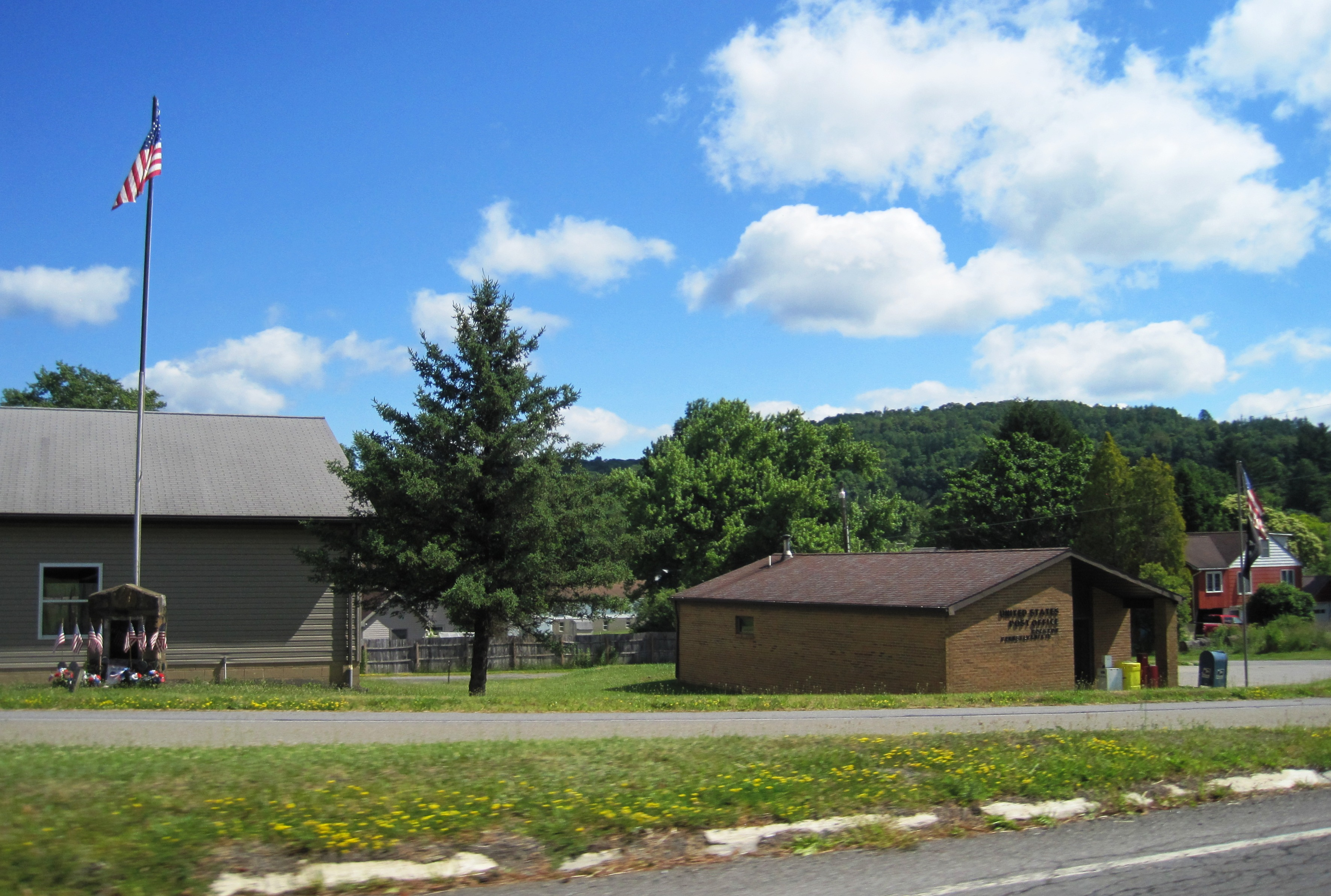
- War memorial and post office

- Location within Pennsylvania
- Coordinates: 41°04′32″N 78°39′11″W
- Country: United States
- State: Pennsylvania
- County: Clearfield
- Elevation: 1,755 ft (535 m)
- Time zone: UTC-5 (Eastern (EST))
  - Summer (DST): UTC-4 (EDT)
- ZIP code: 15856
- Area code: 814
- GNIS feature ID: 1193209

Rockton is an unincorporated community in Clearfield County, Pennsylvania, United States. The community is located on U.S. Route 322, 6.3 miles (10.1 km) east-southeast of DuBois. Rockton has a post office with the ZIP code of 15856.
