= 98.9 FM =

FM radio frequency

The following radio stations broadcast on FM frequency 98.9 MHz:

== Argentina ==
- CONTEMPORANEA, desde Jose C. Paz.
- Activa in Concordia, Entre Ríos
- Si in Rosario, Santa Fe
- Radio de Folklore in Córdoba
- Apuntes in Santos Lugares, Buenos Aires
- Total in Paso de los Libres, Corrientes
- Opción in Ingeniero Budge, Buenos Aires
- Revolución in La Plata, Buenos Aires
- Futuro in Pres. Roque Saenz Peña, Chaco
- Nihuil in Mendoza
- La 100 Formosa in Formosa
- Lider in Ingeniero Maschwitz, Buenos Aires
- Argentina in Neuquén
- La Golosa in Moreno, Buenos Aires
- 989 in Saladillo, Buenos Aires
- La Voz Del Pueblo in Posadas, Misiones
- Metro Mar del Plata in Mar del Plata, Buenos Aires
- Encuentro in Mocoretá, Corrientes
- Ciudad in General Pico, La Pampa
- Ades in Lamadrid, Buenos Aires

== Australia ==
- Triple A Murri Country in Brisbane, Queensland
- Radio National in Griffith, New South Wales
- Triple J in Wollongong, New South Wales
- ABC Classic in Yulara, Northern Territory
- Triple J in Geraldton, Western Australia
- 3NOW in Moreland, Victoria

== Canada (Channel 255) ==
- CBQY-FM in Nipigon, Ontario
- CFCP-FM in Courtenay, British Columbia
- CFPV-FM in Pemberton, British Columbia
- CFYK-FM in Yellowknife, Northwest Territories
- CHCD-FM in Simcoe, Ontario
- CHIK-FM in Quebec City, Quebec
- CHYC-FM in Sudbury, Ontario
- CIGV-FM-1 in Keremeos, British Columbia
- CIKT-FM in Grande Prairie, Alberta
- CILR-FM in Lloydminster, Saskatchewan/Alberta
- CIZL-FM in Regina, Saskatchewan
- CIZZ-FM in Red Deer, Alberta
- CJFX-FM in Antigonish, Nova Scotia
- CJLF-FM-3 in Huntsville, Ontario
- CJRG-FM-7 in Cloridorme, Quebec
- CJYC-FM in Saint John, New Brunswick
- CKLC-FM in Kingston, Ontario
- VF2206 in Kemano, British Columbia

== Cayman Islands ==
- ZFKV-FM at Georgetown

== China ==
- CNR Music Radio in Nanjing
- CNR The Voice of China in Tianshui and Yibin
- Radio Xingning Xingning People's Broadcasting Station in Meizhou

== El Salvador ==
- YSTN at El Salvador

== Malaysia ==
- Minnal FM in Ipoh, Perak
- Zayan in Malacca & North Johor

== Mexico ==
- XHACB-FM in Ciudad Delicias, Chihuahua
- XHAMO-FM in Irapuato, Guanajuato
- XHCHAL-FM in Chalco, State of Mexico
- XHCMN-FM in Ciudad del Carmen, Campeche
- XHCSCG-FM in Ciudad Obregón, Sonora
- XHDGM-FM in Playa del Carmen, Quintana Roo
- XHDU-FM in Durango, Durango
- XHERL-FM in Colima, Colima
- XHERO-FM in Aguascalientes, Aguascalientes
- XHESP-FM in Mazapil, Zacatecas
- XHJD-FM in Monterrey, Nuevo León
- XHMORE-FM in Tijuana, Baja California
- XHMPM-FM in San Blas (Los Mochis), Sinaloa
- XHNGO-FM in Huauchinango, Puebla
- XHNX-FM in Toluca, Estado de México
- XHPBJZ-FM in Juchitán de Zaragoza, Oaxaca
- XHPIXT-FM in Asunción Nochixtlán, Oaxaca
- XHSCBS-FM in Tarandacuao, Guanajuato
- XHSCGV-FM in Jarácuaro Erongarícuaro Municipality, Michoacán
- XHWB-FM in Veracruz, Veracruz
- XHYW-FM in Mérida, Yucatán

== New Zealand ==
- Today FM at Wellington

== Philippines ==
- DWIS in Vigan, Ilocos Sur
- DYRN in Guihulngan, Negros Oriental
- XFM in San Carlos, Negros Occidental
- Radyo Natin in Roxas, Oriental Mindoro

== Portugal ==
- Radio Nova (FM) in Oporto

== United States (Channel 255) ==
- KAAK in Great Falls, Montana
- KBQS-LP in Sacramento, California
- KCOQ in Steamboat Springs, Colorado
- KCVR in Columbia, California
- KFLW in Saint Robert, Missouri
- KFMG-LP in Des Moines, Iowa
- KGBK in Larned, Kansas
- KGRA in Jefferson, Iowa
- KHHT in Mettler, California
- KHWY in Essex, California
- KIOM-LP in Kaunakakai, Hawaii
- KITH in Kapaa, Hawaii
- KKMG in Pueblo, Colorado
- KKPR in Kearney, Nebraska
- KKZX in Spokane, Washington
- KLBY-FM in Albany, Texas
- KLMO in Dilley, Texas
- KLOW in Reno, Texas
- KLYD in Snyder, Texas
- KMKB-LP in Marfa, Texas
- KMRW-LP in Springdale, Arkansas
- KNLW-LP in Rochester, Minnesota
- KOGQ-LP in Oak Grove, Louisiana
- KPIH-LP in Payson, Arizona
- KPNW-FM in Seattle, Washington
- KQCR in Parkersburg, Iowa
- KQQF in Coffeyville, Kansas
- KQRC in Leavenworth, Kansas
- KRME-LP in College Station, Texas
- KRQX-FM in Hurricane, Utah
- KRSM-LP in Minneapolis, Minnesota
- KRVC in Hornbrook, California
- KSOF in Dinuba, California
- KSOL in San Francisco, California
- KTCO in Duluth, Minnesota
- KTEH-LP in Los Molinos, California
- KTUT in Crowell, Texas
- KTUX in Carthage, Texas
- KURA-LP in Ouray, Colorado
- KUTX in Leander, Texas
- KWCP-LP in Little Rock, Arkansas
- KWLU in Chester, California
- KXNZ in Wheeler, Texas
- KXYM-LP in Belcourt, North Dakota
- KYIS in Oklahoma City, Oklahoma
- KYMG in Anchorage, Alaska
- KZLQ-LP in La Quinta, California
- KZPK in Paynesville, Minnesota
- KZXK in Doney Park, Arizona
- WAJV in Brooksville, Mississippi
- WANT in Lebanon, Tennessee
- WAWM in Petoskey, Michigan
- WAXT-LP in Whitehall, Michigan
- WBAM in Montgomery, Alabama
- WBCG in Murdock, Florida
- WBYR in Woodburn, Indiana
- WBZA in Rochester, New York
- WBZE in Tallahassee, Florida
- WCLZ in North Yarmouth, Maine
- WDNE in Elkins, West Virginia
- WDXM-LP in Newburgh, Indiana
- WEMP in Two Rivers, Wisconsin
- WGUF in Marco, Florida
- WHQQ in Neoga, Illinois
- WHYP-LP in Corry, Pennsylvania
- WISH-FM in Galatia, Illinois
- WJEZ in Dwight, Illinois
- WKIM in Munford, Tennessee
- WLFV in Midlothian, Virginia
- WLKU in Rock Island, Illinois
- WLXB in Bethel, North Carolina
- WLYJ in Quitman, Mississippi
- WMKP-LP in Oakwood, Georgia
- WMMO in Orlando, Florida
- WMXY in Youngstown, Ohio
- WNGH in Chatsworth, Georgia
- WNNI in Adams, Massachusetts
- WNRW in Prospect, Kentucky
- WOFE in Byrdstown, Tennessee
- WOKO in Burlington, Vermont
- WOLR-LP in Williamsport, Pennsylvania
- WOOS-LP in Schenectady, New York
- WORC in Webster, Massachusetts
- WOWE in Vassar, Michigan
- WQKY in Emporium, Pennsylvania
- WQLV in Millersburg, Pennsylvania
- WRHE-LP in Dayton, Tennessee
- WSBY in Salisbury, Maryland
- WSIP in Paintsville, Kentucky
- WTMZ-FM in McClellanville, South Carolina
- WTOH in Upper Arlington, Ohio
- WUSL in Philadelphia, Pennsylvania
- WUUU in Franklinton, Louisiana
- WVCX in Tomah, Wisconsin
- WVOY-LP in Jefferson, South Carolina
- WWGA in Tallapoosa, Georgia
- WYRD in Spartanburg, South Carolina
- WYRZ-LP in Brownsburg, Indiana
- WZOL in Vieques, Puerto Rico
