= List of radio stations in Aguascalientes =

This is a list of CRT-licensed radio stations in the state of Aguascalientes, Mexico, which can be sorted by their call signs, frequencies, location, ownership, names, and programming formats.

Radio stations in Aguascalientes
Call sign	Frequency	Location	Owner	Name	Format
XHSCJS-FM	88.1 FM	Tepezalá	Voces de Tepezalá, Cultura de mi Pueblo, A.C.	Oro FM	Community radio
XHBI-FM	88.7 FM	Aguascalientes City	Radio Central, S.A. de C.V.	Radio BI	News/talk
XHPEFD-FM	90.1 FM	Aguascalientes City	Comunicación Integral para la Familia, A.C.	Más Que Radio	Variety
XHUVA-FM	90.5 FM	Aguascalientes City	Radio Central, S.A. de C.V.	Uva	English classic hits
XHPLA-FM	91.3 FM	Aguascalientes City	Radio Libertad, S.A. de C.V.	La Mexicana	Regional Mexican
XHRTA-FM	92.7 FM	Aguascalientes City	Government of the State of Aguascalientes	Conexión	Public Radio
XHAGT-FM	93.7 FM	Aguascalientes City	Irma Graciela Peña Torres	La Mejor	Regional Mexican
XHSCGX-FM	94.1 FM	Pabellón de Arteaga	Medios Digitales Sociales y Culturales de Aguascalientes, A.C.	NV Radio	Community radio
XHUAA-FM	94.5 FM	Aguascalientes City	Autonomous University of Aguascalientes	Radio Universidad	University
XHAGA-FM	95.7 FM	Aguascalientes City	Radio AGS, S.A. de C.V.	Los 40	Contemporary hit radio
XHAGC-FM	97.3 FM	Aguascalientes City	Radio Excedra, S.A. de C.V.	Exa FM	Contemporary hit radio
XHCIF-FM	97.7 FM	Calvillo	Comunicación Integral para la Familia, A.C.	Más Que Radio	Variety
XHNM-FM	98.1 FM	Aguascalientes City	Government of the State of Aguascalientes	Alternativa 98	Rock
XHERO-FM	98.9 FM	Aguascalientes City	Radio Central, S.A. de C.V.	La Invasora	Regional Mexican
XHPLVI-FM	99.7 FM	Calvillo	Arturo Emilio Zorrilla Ibarra	Radio Ranchito	Regional Mexican
XHARZ-FM	100.1 FM	Aguascalientes City	Arnoldo Rodríguez Zermeño	La Sanmarqueña	Spanish adult contemporary
XHCAA-FM	100.9 FM	Aguascalientes City	Radio Calvillo, S.A. de C.V.	Stereorey	English classic hits
XHSCCH-FM	101.3 FM	Calvillo	Comunicar para Ayudar, A.C.	Calvillo FM	Community radio
XHUNO-FM	101.7 FM	Aguascalientes City	Radio Central, S.A. de C.V.	Magia 101	Contemporary hit radio
XHEY-FM	102.9 FM	Aguascalientes City	Josefina Reyes Sahagún	La Kaliente	Regional Mexican
XHSCDR-FM	103.3 FM	Aguascalientes City	Organización Radiofónica de la Villa Asunción de las Aguas Calientes, A.C.	•	Community radio
XHMR-FM	103.7 FM	Aguascalientes City	Instituto Mendel, A.C.	Estéreo Mendel	Variety
XHDC-FM	104.5 FM	Aguascalientes City	Radio XEDC, S.A. de C.V.	Amor Es	Romantic
XHUZ-FM	105.3 FM	Aguascalientes City	Radio Central, S.A. de C.V.	105 Digital	Spanish Contemporary Hit Radio
XHLTZ-FM	106.1 FM	Aguascalientes City	Cosmorradial, S.A. de C.V.	La Ranchera	Ranchera
XHAC-FM	106.9 FM	Aguascalientes City	Manuel Guadalupe, J. Jesús, María Cristina, María Teresa, José Abraham y Alfonso Ramírez de la Torre	Radio Fórmula	News/talk
XHYZ-FM	107.7 FM	Aguascalientes City	Radio Central, S.A. de C.V.	La Poderosa	Regional Mexican
