= XHBI-FM =

Radio station in Aguascalientes, Aguascalientes, Mexico

- Aguascalientes, Aguascalientes; Mexico
- Frequency: 88.7 FM
- Branding: Radio BI

Programming
- Format: All-news radio

Ownership
- Owner: Radiogrupo; (Radio Central, S.A. de C.V.)
- Sister stations: XHUVA-FM, XHERO-FM, XHUNO-FM, XHUZ-FM, XHYZ-FM

History
- First air date: September 6, 1936
- Former call signs: XEBI-AM

Technical information
- Licensing authority: CRT
- Class: C1
- ERP: 25 kW
- HAAT: 69.91 meters (229.4 ft)
- Transmitter coordinates: 21°55′08.2″N 102°15′44.2″W

Links
- Webcast: Listen live
- Website: binoticias.com

XHBI-FM is a radio station on 88.7 FM in Aguascalientes, Aguascalientes, Mexico. The station is owned by Radiogrupo and carries an all-news radio format known as Radio BI.

== History ==
On September 6, 1936, XEBI-AM 1000 came to air for the first time. It was the first radio station in central Mexico, operating at 25 watts to cover the city of Aguascalientes. Founded by Pedro Rivas Cuéllar, the station began operating from the Rivas family home three hours a day, with many local artists.

In the 1940s, the station linked up to Radio Programas de México, gaining access to national advertisers and the programming of Mexico City stations XEW and XEQ. The station then moved to 790 kHz. It also increased its power to 1 kW. By the end of World War II, the station had a magnetic tape recorder.

In 1950, XEYZ-AM, a station which Rivas partly owned for some time, came to air, and in 1958, Rivas bought competing station XERO (now XHERO-FM 98.9). By 1970, the group also included XEUVA-AM. The group grew again in the late 1980s with the sign-on of XHUZ-FM, becoming known as Radiogrupo. With the sign-on of XHUNO-FM and later the reacquisition of XEYZ-AM, Radiogrupo would grow to own six stations in Aguascalientes.

In 2010, XEBI received approval to move to FM as XHBI-FM 88.7.

== See also ==
- Television stations in Aguascalientes
- List of television stations in Mexico
- List of radio stations in Aguascalientes
