= 107.7 FM =

FM radio frequency

The following radio stations broadcast on FM frequency 107.7 MHz:

== Argentina ==
- Azul in Río Primero, Córdoba
- Cadena Energy in Alta Italia, La Pampa
- Chajarí al Día in Chajarí, Entre Ríos
- del Parque in Casbas, Buenos Aires
- Digital in Villa Ocampo, Santa Fe
- Flash in Santa Rosa de Calamuchita, Córdoba
- Futura in Diamante, Entre Ríos
- LRR 717 San Roque in San Roque, Corrientes
- Mitre Mar del Plata in Mar del Plata, Buenos Aires
- Nación in Posadas, Misiones
- Pop Life in San Juan
- Q in Formosa
- Quilpo in San Marcos Sierras, Córdoba
- Escucha in Tortuguitas, Buenos Aires
- Golden in Rio Cuarto, Córdoba
- Espíritu Santo in Córdoba
- Estudio in Campana, Buenos Aires
- Estudio in Mendoza
- Paraíso in Punta Alta, Buenos Aires
- Radio María in General Roca, Río Negro
- Radio María in Rafaela, Santa Fe
- Rhema in Allen, Río Negro
- San Carlos in San Carlos Centro, Santa Fe
- Urbana in San Luis
- Voces in Lomas de Zamora, Buenos Aires

== Armenia ==
- Public Radio of Armenia at Yerevan

== Australia ==
- 2DRY FM in Broken Hill, New South Wales
- Triple M Central Coast in Gosford, New South Wales
- Ace Radio in Swan Hill, Victoria
- Radio National in Coober Pedy, South Australia
- Sea FM in Devonport, Tasmania
- Triple J in Brisbane, Queensland

== Canada (Channel 299) ==
- CBEZ-FM in Britt, Ontario
- CFRV-FM in Lethbridge, Alberta
- CFSM-FM-3 in Invermere, British Columbia
- CHGK-FM in Stratford, Ontario
- CHMY-FM-1 in Arnprior, Ontario
- CIRG-FM in Cornwall, Ontario
- CIRH-FM in Halifax, Nova Scotia
- CISF-FM in Surrey, British Columbia
- CITA-FM-4 in Bouctouche, New Brunswick
- CJFY-FM in Blackville, New Brunswick
- CJRO-FM in Carlsbad Springs, Ontario
- CJXR-FM in Steinbach, Manitoba
- CKDO-FM-1 in Oshawa, Ontario
- CKHK-FM in Hawksbury, Ontario
- CKOY-FM in Sherbrooke, Quebec
- CKTI-FM in Kettle Point, Ontario
- CKUA-FM-6 in Red Deer, Alberta
- VF2485 in Black Brook, New Brunswick
- VF2486 in Deersdale, New Brunswick
- VF2487 in Kedgwick, New Brunswick
- VF2560 in Pemberton, Ontario

== China ==
- CNR Music Radio in Changsha, Kunshan, Miluo, Shanghai, Suzhou and Yueyang
- GRT Sports Radio in Guangzhou

== France ==
- In France this frequency is used by low power transmitters along the motorways/highways to provide traffic information services to drivers. Several networks (e.g. Radio Vinci Autoroutes, Autoroute Info, Sanef 107,7) air their programme on FM 107.7 by low power transmitters, which can only be received on the highways and in a short distance away from the highway. These three stations are all well-known for their frequent traffic reports (every 15 minutes), although the music accounts for 90% of their daily programming, with ten songs per hour.

== Indonesia ==
- Radio Alfa Omega in Batam and Singapore
- Radio JJM in Jakarta, Indonesia
- UMN Radio in Tangerang, Indonesia
- Jukebox (Weekday Broadcast) In Jakarta, Indonesia (COMING SOON)
- The Hits Weekend Service (Weekend Broadcast) In Jakarta, Indonesia (COMING SOON)

== Mexico ==
- XHASM-FM in Ahuatepec, Morelos
- XHIXMI-FM in Ixmiquilpan, Hidalgo
- XHMN-FM in Monterrey, Nuevo León
- XHRST-FM in Tijuana, Baja California
- XHSCAP-FM in Miahuatlán de Porfirio Díaz, Oaxaca
- XHSCHE-FM in Santa María Del Oro, Durango
- XHSCIO-FM in Ahuatitla, San Felipe Orizatlán municipality, Hidalgo
- XHUARO-FM in Pátzcuaro, Michoacán
- XHXAL-FM in Xalapa, Veracruz
- XHYZ-FM in Aguascalientes, Aguascalientes
- XHZCM-FM in Cozumel, Quintana Roo

== New Zealand ==
- Various low-power stations up to 1 watt

== Philippines ==
- DWTJ in Tabaco
- DYUB in Kalibo
- DXID in Dipolog
- DXQB in Quezon, Bukidnon
- DWNF in Vinzons, Camarines Norte

== South Korea ==
- SBS Power FM

== Taiwan ==
- Hit Fm Taiwan in Taipei, Hualien
- National Education Radio in Chiayi, Tainan

== United Kingdom ==
- Greatest Hits Radio Black Country & Shropshire in Wolverhampton (Black Country) and Shropshire
- Greatest Hits Radio Peterborough, Stamford & Rutland in Peterborough
- Greatest Hits Radio South West in Swindon and north Somerset
- Keith Community Radio in Keith
- Heart North and Mid Wales in Aberystwyth
- Heart North East in Teesside
- Heart South Wales in Ceredigion
- Heart Yorkshire in Sheffield
- Greatest Hits Radio Swindon in Swindon and Weston-super-Mare
- More Radio Worthing in Worthing, West Sussex, formerly 107.7 Splash FM
- Radio Essex in Chelmsford
- Smooth North East in Nunthorpe
- Soleil Radio in St Helier

== United States (Channel 299) ==
- KABD in Ipswich, South Dakota
- KBMX in Proctor, Minnesota
- KBPY in Hay Springs, Nebraska
- KCDZ in Twentynine Palms, California
- KCVK in Otterville, Missouri
- KDCZ in Saint Charles, Minnesota
- KFFW-LP in Atwater, California
- KGCR in Goodland, Kansas
- KHSQ in Trinidad, California
- KICD-FM in Spencer, Iowa
- KIMI in Malvern, Iowa
- KIRS in Stockton, Missouri
- KIST-FM in Carpinteria, California
- KJAG in Guthrie, Texas
- KJLL-LP in Hobbs, New Mexico
- KKOA in Volcano, Hawaii
- KLAL in Wrightsville, Arkansas
- KLJA in Georgetown, Texas
- KLZK-FM in Idalou, Texas
- KLOT-LP in Cat Spring, Texas
- KMAJ-FM in Carbondale, Kansas
- KMTZ in Walkerville, Montana
- KNDD in Seattle, Washington
- KNYO-LP in Fort Bragg, California
- KOTU-LP in Riddle, Oregon
- KOUL in Agua Dulce, Texas
- KPLT-FM in Paris, Texas
- KPWJ in Kurten, Texas
- KRXO-FM in Oklahoma City, Oklahoma
- KSAN (FM) in San Mateo, California
- KSLZ in Saint Louis, Missouri
- KSRN in Kings Beach, California
- KSYZ-FM in Grand Island, Nebraska
- KTBQ in Nacogdoches, Texas
- KWVN-FM in Pendleton, Oregon
- KWXS in Prineville, Oregon
- KZBH in Hico, Texas
- WACC-LP in Enfield, Connecticut
- WAIY-LP in Belchertown, Massachusetts
- WAJP in Perry, Florida
- WAZA (FM) in Liberty, Mississippi
- WBKA in Bar Harbor, Maine
- WCIW-LP in Immokalee, Florida
- WECW in Elmira, New York
- WFCS in New Britain, Connecticut
- WFSP-FM in Kingwood, West Virginia
- WFUG-LP in Lehigh Acres, Florida
- WFXX in Georgiana, Alabama
- WGBG-FM in Fruitland, Maryland
- WGNA-FM in Albany, New York
- WGTY in Gettysburg, Pennsylvania
- WGWY-LP in Greenville, South Carolina
- WHFX in Darien, Georgia
- WHHM-FM in Henderson, Tennessee
- WHQX in Gary, West Virginia
- WHSB in Alpena, Michigan
- WHSL in Lisman, Alabama
- WIBL in Fairbury, Illinois
- WIVK-FM in Knoxville, Tennessee
- WJRP-LP in Calhoun, Georgia
- WKYN in Mount Sterling, Kentucky
- WLBX-LP in Decherd, Tennessee
- WLGD in Dallas, Pennsylvania
- WGR-FM in Wethersfield, New York
- WLLJ-LP in Cape Coral, Florida
- WLWR-LP in Marinette, Wisconsin
- WMES-LP in Altoona, Pennsylvania
- WMGF in Mount Dora, Florida
- WMMX in Dayton, Ohio
- WMOV-FM in Norfolk, Virginia
- WMQT in Ishpeming, Michigan
- WMRS in Monticello, Indiana
- WNOU in Sasser, Georgia
- WPFX-FM in Luckey, Ohio
- WPOV-LP in Vineland, New Jersey
- WPRW-FM in Martinez, Georgia
- WQBS-FM in Carolina, Puerto Rico
- WQUD in Erie, Illinois
- WRKR in Portage, Michigan
- WRQW in Cooperstown, Pennsylvania
- WRRC in Lawrenceville, New Jersey
- WRWL-LP in Galloway, New Jersey
- WSEO in Nelsonville, Ohio
- WSFR in Corydon, Indiana
- WTPL in Hillsboro, New Hampshire
- WUHT in Birmingham, Alabama
- WUKS in Saint Pauls, North Carolina
- WVCY-FM in Milwaukee, Wisconsin
- WVEW-LP in Brattleboro, Vermont
- WVPK-LP in Paducah, Kentucky
- WVRW in Glenville, West Virginia
- WWDW in Alberta, Virginia
- WWRX (FM) in Bradford, Rhode Island
- WWWT-FM in Manassas, Virginia
- WXXF in Loudonville, Ohio
