= XHUVA-FM =

Radio station in Aguascalientes City, Mexico

- Aguascalientes, Aguascalientes; Mexico
- Frequency: 90.5 FM (HD Radio)
- Branding: Uva

Programming
- Format: Adult hits
- Affiliations: Imagen Informativa

Ownership
- Owner: Radiogrupo; (Radio Central, S.A. de C.V.)
- Sister stations: XHBI-FM, XHERO-FM, XHUNO-FM, XHUZ-FM, XHYZ-FM

History
- First air date: September 20, 1974
- Former call signs: XEUVA-AM
- Former frequencies: 1170 KHZ
- Call sign meaning: "Uva" is Spanish for grape

Technical information
- Licensing authority: CRT
- Class: B1
- ERP: 25 kW
- HAAT: 1.18 meters (3.9 ft)
- Transmitter coordinates: 21°53′04″N 102°19′56″W

Links
- Webcast: Listen live
- Website: radiogrupo.com

XHUVA-FM is a radio station in Aguascalientes City, Aguascalientes, Mexico. Broadcasting on 90.5 FM, XHUVA-FM is owned by Radiogrupo and carries an adult hits format known as Uva.

== History ==
XEUVA-AM 1170 received its concession on September 20, 1974. It migrated to FM after receiving its authorization in 2010.

Previous formats have included La Rancherita and Radio Recuerdo.
