= KSNY =

KSNY may refer to:

- KSNY (AM), a radio station (1450 AM) licensed to Snyder, Texas, United States
- KSNY-FM, a radio station (101.5 FM) licensed to Snyder, Texas, United States
- The ICAO code for Sidney Municipal Airport (Nebraska)
