= KLYD =

Coordinates: 32.757°N 100.903°W

- Snyder, Texas; United States
- Broadcast area: Big Spring-Snyder, Texas
- Frequency: 98.9 (MHz)
- Branding: Real Rock 98.9 fm

Programming
- Format: Modern Rock

Ownership
- Owner: Delbert Foree
- Sister stations: KSNY, KSNY-FM

History
- First air date: 2003

Technical information
- Licensing authority: FCC
- Facility ID: 81514
- Class: A
- ERP: 5,600 watts
- HAAT: 341 meters (1,119 ft)

Links
- Public license information: Public file; LMS
- Website: KLYD FM

KLYD (98.9 FM) is a commercial radio station located in Snyder, Texas, broadcasting to the Big Spring-Snyder, Texas, area. KLYD airs a modern rock music format. The call letters were previously held by KISV and KLHC in Bakersfield, California.
