= XHNM-FM =

Radio station in Aguascalientes, Aguascalientes, Mexico

- Aguascalientes, Aguascalientes; Mexico
- Broadcast area: Aguascalientes
- Frequency: 98.1 FM
- Branding: Alternativa 98

Programming
- Format: Public radio

Ownership
- Owner: Dirección General de Radio y Televisión de Aguascalientes (RyTA); (Gobierno del Estado de Aguascalientes)
- Sister stations: XHRTA-FM, XHCGA-TDT

History
- First air date: October 12, 1973 (AM); August 2015 (FM)
- Former call signs: XENM-AM

Technical information
- Licensing authority: CRT
- Class: B1
- ERP: 15 kW
- HAAT: 46.41 m (152.3 ft)
- Transmitter coordinates: 21°50′47″N 102°17′09″W (FM); 21°58′20″N 102°19′04″W (AM)

Links
- Webcast: Listen live
- Website: alternativaradio.fm

XHNM-FM (98.1 MHz) is a radio station in Aguascalientes, Aguascalientes, Mexico, formerly located in Jesús María. It is owned by the state government of Aguascalientes through its Radio y Televisión de Aguascalientes division and is the sister station to XHRTA-FM 92.7 and XHCGA-TDT 26.

== History ==
XENM-AM 1320 signed on October 12, 1973. It was originally known as Radio Casa de la Cultura, later changing its name to Radio Instituto Cultural de Aguascalientes, La Voz del Estado, and then Radio Solidaridad. It was known in the early 2010s as "La Estación". In 2007, its daytime power was raised from 1 kW to 6.

The new FM station signed on in August 2015. At that time, the station changed its name from "La Estación" to "Teleradio", with a simulcast of the audio of many XHCGA programs; this was dropped for a new name, "Tu Estación" (Your Station), in 2017. XHNM-FM is located at a different transmitter site from that used by XENM-AM.

Former logo

The Tu Estación name and programming moved to 92.7 XHRTA-FM in early 2018, and 98.1 became Alternativa 98.

== See also ==
- Television stations in Aguascalientes
- List of television stations in Mexico
- List of radio stations in Aguascalientes
