= Canal 26 =

Canal 26 may refer to:

- Canal 26 (Argentina), an Argentine news pay television channel
- Canal 26 (Aguascalientes), a television station in Aguascalientes City, Mexico
