= Dave McGinnis =

American football player, coach and sportscaster (1951–2026)

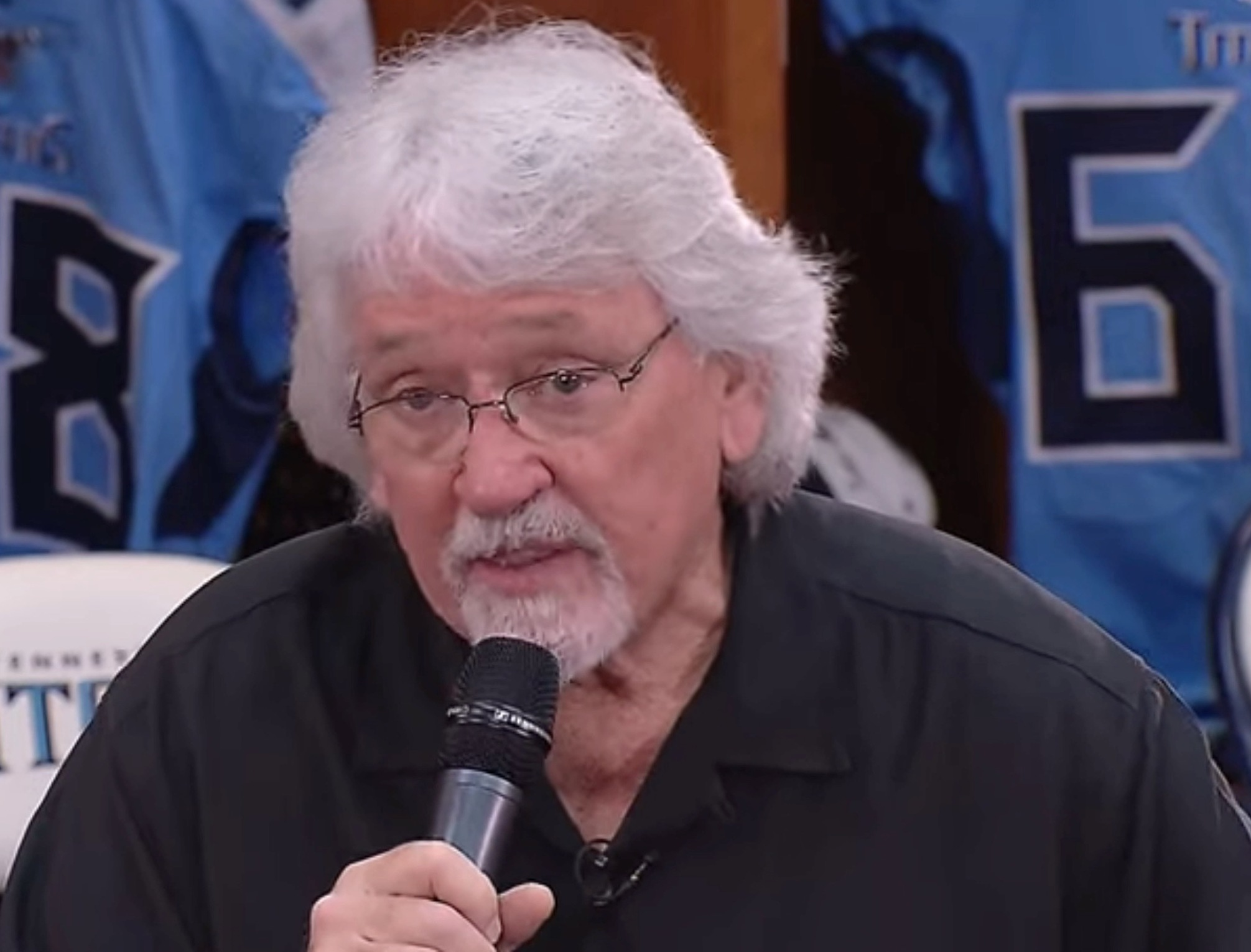
- McGinnis in 2022

Profile
- Position: Defensive back

Personal information
- Born: August 7, 1951; Independence, Kansas, U.S.
- Died: April 13, 2026 (aged 74); Nashville, Tennessee, U.S.

Career information
- High school: Snyder (Snyder, Texas)
- College: TCU

Career history
- Texas Christian (1973–1974) Graduate assistant; Missouri (1975) Graduate assistant; Missouri (1976–1977) Defensive backs coach; Indiana State (1978, 1980–1981) Defensive backs coach; Texas Christian (1982) Defensive backs coach; Kansas State (1983–1985) Defensive backs coach; Chicago Bears (1986–1995) Linebackers coach; Arizona Cardinals (1996–2000) Defensive coordinator; Arizona Cardinals (2000–2003) Head coach; Tennessee Titans (2004–2011) Linebackers coach; St. Louis/Los Angeles Rams (2012–2016) Assistant head coach

Head coaching record
- Regular season: 17–40 (.298)
- Coaching profile at Pro Football Reference

David McGinnis (August 7, 1951 – April 13, 2026) was an American professional football coach in the National Football League (NFL). He was the head coach of the Arizona Cardinals from 2000 to 2003 and assistant head coach of the St. Louis/Los Angeles Rams from 2012 to 2016.

McGinnis played college football for the TCU Horned Frogs. He began coaching at the collegiate level before moving to the NFL. After his coaching career, he was the color commentator for the Tennessee Titans Radio Network.

== Biography ==
McGinnis graduated from Snyder High School in Snyder, Texas. He was a three-year starter as a defensive back for the Horned Frogs at Texas Christian University, where he graduated in 1973 with a degree in business management. McGinnis spent 13 years coaching in college football, at Texas Christian University (1973–74, '82), Missouri (1975–77), Indiana State (1978, 1980–81) and Kansas State (1983–85).

From 1986 to 1995, McGinnis was the linebackers coach for the Chicago Bears, the defensive coordinator for the Arizona Cardinals from 1996 to 2000, and head coach of the Arizona Cardinals from 2000 to 2003.

He was the assistant head coach/linebackers coach for the Tennessee Titans in 2004.

In 2017, McGinnis replaced Frank Wycheck as the color analyst on the Tennessee Titans Radio Network.

McGinnis died on April 13, 2026, at the age of 74 in Nashville.

== Chicago Bears controversy ==
In January 1999, while still on the Cardinals coaching staff, McGinnis interviewed for the head coach position with the Chicago Bears. Team president Michael McCaskey then prematurely organized a news conference in order to announce McGinnis as their new coach, which caught McGinnis by surprise as he had not agreed to a contract. The Bears postponed the conference with chairman Ed McCaskey issuing an apology to McGinnis. Upset that the news had reached his family and friends, plus Cardinals owner Bill Bidwill and head coach Vince Tobin, McGinnis declined the position and removed his name from consideration.

== Head coaching record ==
Team	Year	Regular season					Postseason			
Team	Year	Won	Lost	Ties	Win %	Finish	Won	Lost	Win %	Result
ARI	2000	1	8	0	.111	5th in NFC East	-	-	-	(mid-season replacement)
ARI	2001	7	9	0	.438	4th in NFC East	-	-	-	
ARI	2002	5	11	0	.313	4th in NFC West	-	-	-	
ARI	2003	4	12	0	.250	4th in NFC West	-	-	-	-
ARI Total		17	40	0	.298					
Total		17	40	0	.298					
