= Hayward Clay =

American football player (born 1973)

No. 81, 83, 43
- Position: Tight end

Personal information
- Born: July 5, 1973 (age 53); Snyder, Texas, U.S.
- Listed height: 6 ft 3 in (1.91 m)
- Listed weight: 260 lb (118 kg)

Career information
- High school: Snyder
- College: Texas A&M
- NFL draft: 1996: 6th round, 201st overall pick

Career history
- St. Louis Rams (1996); Chicago Bears (1998)*; Dallas Cowboys (1998–1999); → Rhein Fire (1998); Miami Dolphins (2000)*; Orlando Rage (2001)*
- * Offseason or practice squad member only

Awards and highlights
- Second-team All-SWC (1995)

Career NFL statistics
- Receptions: 5
- Receiving yards: 78
- Stats at Pro Football Reference

Hayward John Clay Jr. (born July 5, 1973) is an American former professional football player who was a tight end in the National Football League (NFL) for the St. Louis Rams and Dallas Cowboys. He played college football for the Texas A&M Aggies.

== Early life ==
Clay attended Snyder High School, where he was used as a blocking tight end in a run-oriented offense. He accepted a football scholarship from Texas A&M University, where he had the same role as a blocking tight end.

In 1992, he played in 13 games as a freshman, catching one pass for 11 yards for a team that went 12–1. However, the Aggies lost the Cotton Bowl 28–3 to Notre Dame. In 1993, he appeared in 11 games as a sophomore, while making five receptions for 85 yards. Again the Aggies lost the Cotton Bowl to Notre Dame.

In 1994, he played in 11 games as a junior, catching four passes for 37 yards for an Aggies team that went 10–0–1 and finished the season ranked 8th. In 1995, as a senior he had his best season, posting 10 starts, 19 receptions for 235 yards and three touchdowns. He played in 46 career games, finishing with 30 receptions for 368 yards and three touchdowns.

== Professional career ==
=== St. Louis Rams ===
Clay was selected by the St. Louis Rams in the sixth round (201st overall) of the 1996 NFL draft. As a rookie, he was the third-string tight end, appearing in 11 games, and started 4 contests after Troy Drayton was injured and Aaron Laing had to replace the starting fullback. He caught four passes for 51 yards. He registered 4 receptions for 51 yards.

He was waived on August 30, 1997. In 1998, he was signed by the Rams and was released before the start of the season.

=== Chicago Bears ===
On June 24, 1998, he signed a two-year contract with the Chicago Bears. He was released on August 30.

=== Dallas Cowboys ===
August 31, 1998, he was claimed off waivers by the Dallas Cowboys. Although he began the season as the third-string tight end, a knee injury to starter David LaFleur allowed him to play in the last three games of the season, starting two. On December 20 against the Philadelphia Eagles, he caught his only pass of the year, for 27 yards.

On August 31, 1999, he was placed on injured reserve list with a knee injury he suffered in training camp, as a result he missed the entire season. He was cut on February 10, 2000.

=== Miami Dolphins ===
On May 16, 2000, he was signed as a free agent by the Miami Dolphins. On July 27, he had arthroscopy surgery on his left knee, which would limit him during training camp. He was cut on August 22.

In 2001, Clay was selected in the eleventh round (84th overall) of the XFL draft by the Orlando Rage.
