= WTPM =

WTPM may refer to:

- WTPM (FM), a radio station (92.9 FM) licensed to serve Aguadilla, Puerto Rico
- WTPM-LD, a low-power television station (channel 28, virtual 45) licensed to serve Mayaguez-Anasco, Puerto Rico
