= XHRTA-FM =

Radio station in Aguascalientes, Aguascalientes

- Aguascalientes City, Aguascalientes; Mexico
- Frequency: 92.7 FM
- Branding: Conexión

Programming
- Format: Talk radio

Ownership
- Owner: Dirección General de Radio y Televisión de Aguascalientes (RyTA); (Gobierno del Estado de Aguascalientes)
- Sister stations: XHNM-FM, XHCGA-TDT

History
- First air date: November 17, 2000
- Call sign meaning: Radio y Televisión de Aguascalientes

Technical information
- Class: C1
- ERP: 65 kW
- Transmitter coordinates: 21°50′46.7″N 102°17′16.5″W

Links
- Webcast: Listen live
- Website: ryta.com.mx

XHRTA-FM is a radio station on 92.7 FM in Aguascalientes City, Aguascalientes, Mexico. It is owned by the state government through its Radio y Televisión de Aguascalientes division.

== Format ==
When the station signed on in late 2000, it was known as "Alternativa"; the station often aired older music. Since the beginning of the government of Luis Armando Reynoso, 92.7 FM began airing more jazz programming.

In early 2018, a format swap was conducted with co-owned XHNM-FM, in which 92.7 became Tu Estación and the Alternativa programming began airing on 98.1.

== See also ==
- Television stations in Aguascalientes
- List of television stations in Mexico
- List of radio stations in Aguascalientes
