= Tony Degrate =

American football player (born 1962)

No. 95
- Positions: Defensive end, defensive tackle

Personal information
- Born: April 25, 1962 (age 64); Snyder, Texas, U.S.
- Listed height: 6 ft 4 in (1.93 m)
- Listed weight: 280 lb (127 kg)

Career information
- High school: Snyder
- College: Texas
- NFL draft: 1985: 5th round, 127th overall pick

Career history
- Cincinnati Bengals (1985)*; Green Bay Packers (1985); Tampa Bay Buccaneers (1986)*
- * Offseason or practice squad member only

Awards and highlights
- Lombardi Award (1984); Consensus All-American (1984); 2× First-team All-SWC (1983, 1984); Cotton Bowl champion - 1982
- Stats at Pro Football Reference

Anthony Degrate (born April 25, 1962) is an American former professional football player who won the 1984 Lombardi Award and earned consensus All-American honors. He played college football for the Texas Longhorns, where he was a defensive tackle and still holds the record for most solo tackles in a season, He was selected by the Cincinnati Bengals of the National Football League (NFL) in the 1985 NFL draft, and played professionally for the NFL's Green Bay Packers as a defensive end.

== Early life ==
Degrate was born in Snyder, Texas and played high school football and baseball at Snyder High School, where he was All-State Honorable Mention in football and threw a 96mph fastball.

== College career ==
He played college football at the University of Texas at Austin from 1981 to 1984 where he majored in commercial arts.

In 1981, he only played in one game - against TCU - recording one tackle and one sack. That season the Longhorns spent a week ranked #1 and came in 2nd in the Southwest Conference, but because SMU was banned from post-season play, they played in the 1982 Cotton Bowl Classic where they upset Alabama and finished the season ranked #2.

In 1982 he played in every game. The Longhorns again finished in 2nd place in the Conference behind SMU and were ranked #8 when they were upset by the North Carolina Tarheels in the Sun Bowl.

He was a first-team All-Southwest Conference (SWC) selection in 1983, led the team in tackles for a loss (22), the third most in a season in school history at the time and was a key member of the 1983 Longhorns team that won the SWC championship and finished ranked #5. That season the Longhorns lost the Cotton Bowl by 1 point, where a win would've secured them the National Championship.

In 1984, his senior year, he was a team captain. He led the team in forced fumbles (4), tackles for a loss (18), quarterback sacks (13), 7th most in a season in school history at the time, and tackles (147), the third most in a season in school history at the time; and set the school record for solo tackles in a season (123). Against Texas Tech, he had 5 tackles for a loss, which tied for the 3rd most ever in a single game in school history. He also had the 6th most quarterback pressures in a season in school history at the time. The Longhorns spent two weeks that season ranked #1, but a late season slide put them in the 1984 Freedom Bowl which they lost to Iowa. Degrate was again 1st team all-conference and was also a consensus first-team All-American and the Houston Post's Southwest Conference Defensive MVP. Most notably, he came in second in voting for the Outland Trophy and he was the second Longhorn to win the Lombardi Award honoring the best lineman in college football.

He finished his career with the 3rd most quarterback sacks (31) and 5th most tackles for a loss (47) in a career in school history.

After his senior year, he played on the losing side of the 1985 Hula Bowl game.

In 1989, he was named to the San Antonio Express-News All-Time Southwest Conference Football Second Team.

In 2005 he was enshrined in the Longhorns Hall of Honor.

== Professional career ==
In January of 1985 he was drafted by the USFL's San Antonio Gunslingers in the 1985 USFL territorial draft but he never signed with them. Nor did he saign with the USFL's Tampa Bay Bandits despite them offering him a $2.4 million contract in March of 1984.

A few months later the Cincinnati Bengals drafted Degrate 127th overall in the fifth round of the 1985 NFL draft, which was a disappointment for him since most Lombardi Award winners were drafted in the 1st round. Part of the reason he slipped was because he'd talked to the Bandits, but also scouts said he lacked the necessary agility and quickness. Being drafted late shook his confidence and he reported not working out or going to classes like he should and becoming reclusive. At camp, he expected to play noseguard, but he spent the first two weeks at defensive end before being moved to that position. After another week, he started having problems with his right knee again. The Bengals switched him back to end and then cut him before he even played in a preseason game. The Bengals said it was because they had better veterans on the team already, but Degrate said he ddin't get his mind and body right.

On September 27, 1985 he was signed by the Green Bay Packers for whom he played two snaps in one game, recording no stats and was cut the next day on October 7th. After being cut he again caused him to withdraw, and the surprise fall caused some to assume he was using drugs - though there was no evidence that he did. He went into commercial art between seasons.

In February 1986, he was signed by the Tampa Bay Buccaneers and despite solid performances in camp and preseason games, he was cut at the end of training camp.

== Later Life ==
Being cut by Tampa Bay, Degrate returned to Snyder. Later he worked as a strength and conditioning coach in Cedar Park, Texas. In 2012, he coached Cedar Park's 6-man football team to a 1-9 record.

== See also ==
- 1984 College Football All-America Team
- List of University of Texas at Austin alumni
- Texas Longhorns
