= XHSCAP-FM =

Community radio station in Miahuatlán, Oaxaca, Mexico

Miahuatlán de Porfirio Díaz, Oaxaca; Mexico
- Frequency: 107.7 FM
- Branding: Soley Radio

Programming
- Format: Community radio

Ownership
- Owner: Soley Sin Barreras, A.C.

History
- First air date: February 14, 2019
- Former frequencies: 93.5 FM (as a pirate)
- Call sign meaning: (templated callsign)

Technical information
- Class: A
- ERP: 813 watts
- HAAT: -151.9 meters
- Transmitter coordinates: 16°19′54.3″N 96°35′49.9″W

Links
- Website: XHSCAP-FM on Facebook

XHSCAP-FM is a community radio station on 107.7 FM in Miahuatlán de Porfirio Díaz, Oaxaca. The station is owned by the civil association Soley Sin Barreras, A.C.

== History ==
Soley Sin Barreras filed for a community station on October 12, 2016. The station's award was approved on May 23, 2018, and XHSCAP went on the air February 14, 2019.
