= XHIXMI-FM =

Radio station in Ixmiquilpan, Hidalgo

- Ixmiquilpan, Hidalgo; Mexico
- Frequency: 107.7 FM
- Branding: La Brillante

Programming
- Format: Spanish Christian

Ownership
- Owner: Familia Brillante, A.C.

History
- First air date: 2017 (social community concession)
- Call sign meaning: IXMIquilpan

Technical information
- Class: A
- ERP: 537 watts
- HAAT: -139 meters
- Transmitter coordinates: 20°28′33.59″N 99°12′53.42″W

Links
- Website: radiolabrillante.org

XHIXMI-FM is a community radio station on 107.7 FM in Ixmiquilpan, Hidalgo. It is known as La Brillante and owned by the civil association Familia Brillante, A.C.

== History ==
La Brillante went on the air in 2014 as an unlicensed station on 107.7. The Federal Telecommunications Institute granted the group a community radio station concession on November 15, 2017.
