= Canal 26 (Aguascalientes) =

Public TV station in Aguascalientes, Mexico

XHCGA-TDT
- Aguascalientes, Aguascalientes; Mexico
- Channels: Digital: 26 (UHF); Virtual: 26
- Branding: VA+ TV

Programming
- Affiliations: Canal Once; TV UNAM; Mexicanal; ATEI; Red TAL; La Red México

Ownership
- Owner: Dirección General de Radio y Televisión de Aguascalientes (RyTA); (Gobierno del Estado de Aguascalientes)
- Sister stations: XHNM-FM, XHRTA-FM

History
- Founded: October 12, 1976
- First air date: November 17, 1976
- Former call signs: XHCGA-TV (1987–2015); XHCPAG-TDT (January–September 2022)
- Former channel numbers: 10 (analog, 1970s–1986); 6 (analog, 1987–2015)
- Call sign meaning: Templated call sign

Technical information
- Licensing authority: CRT
- ERP: 150 kW
- HAAT: 405.4 meters (1,330 ft)
- Transmitter coordinates: 21°39′38″N 102°13′38″W

Links
- Website: www.ryta.com.mx

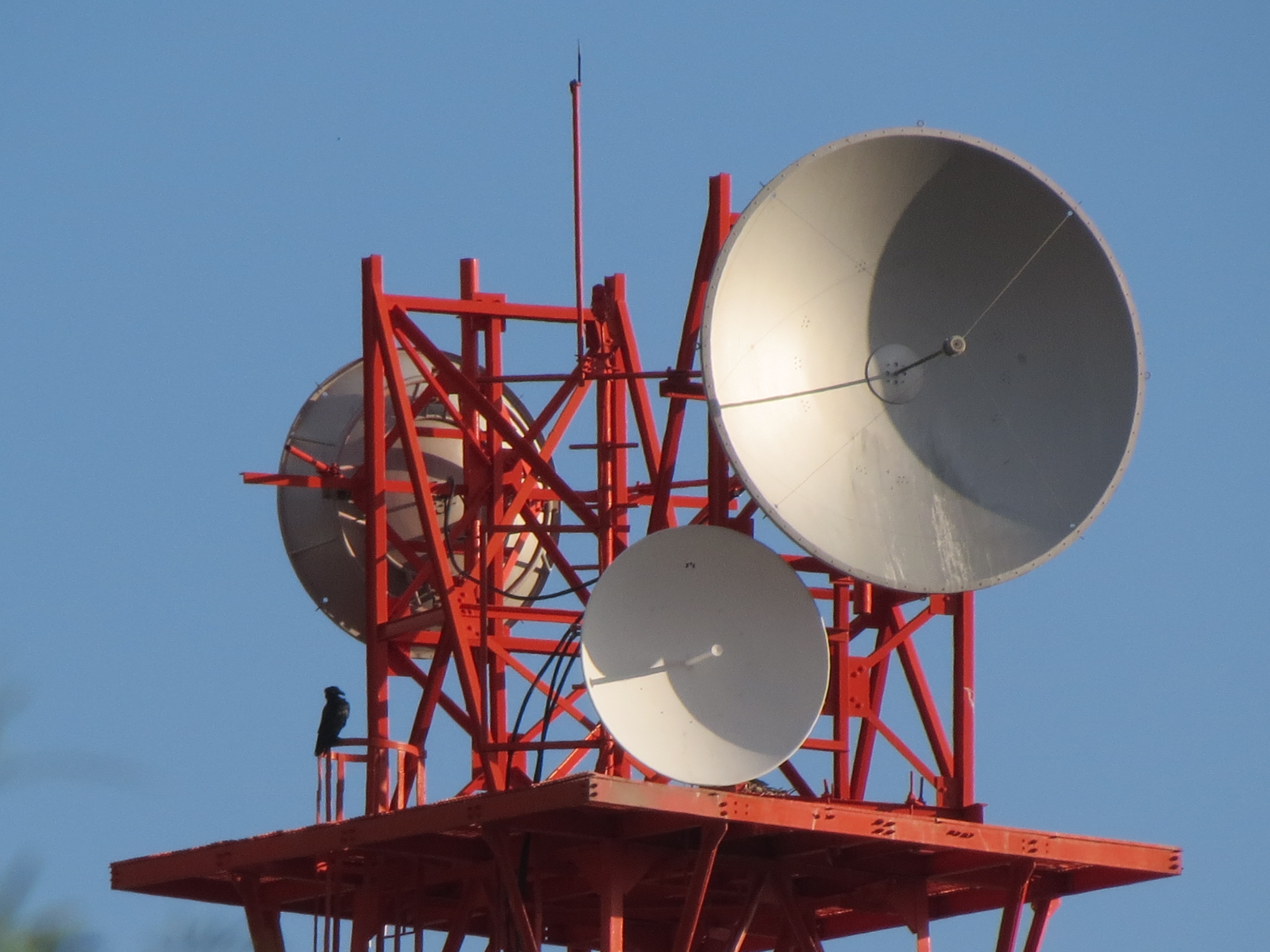

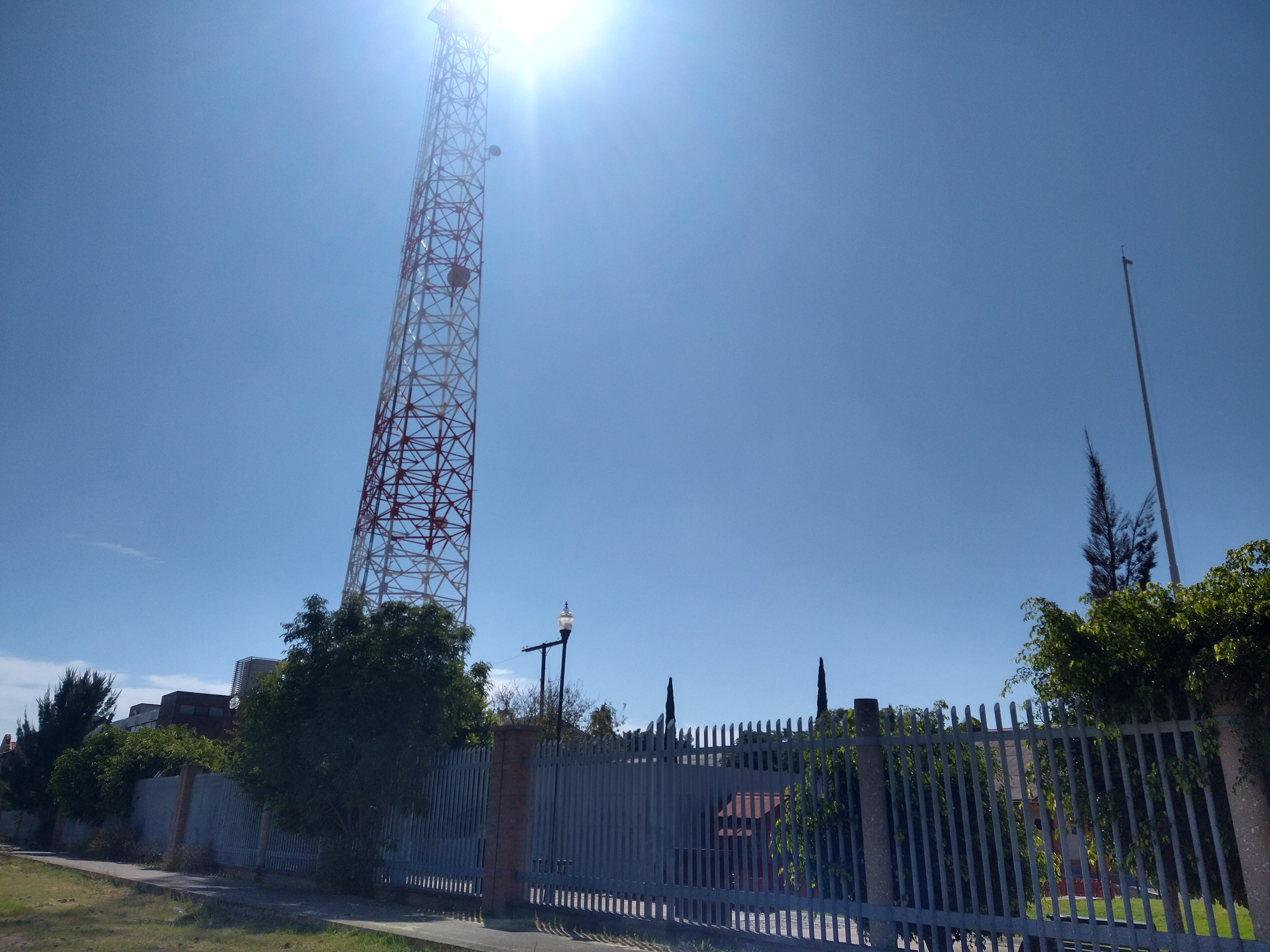

VA+ TV (call sign XHCGA-TDT) is a television station in Aguascalientes City, Mexico. It was established on October 12, 1976, with the support of the Instituto Cultural de Aguascalientes. It is part of Radio y Televisión de Aguascalientes, the public television and radio broadcaster for the state. It also airs programming from Canal Once and TV UNAM.

== History ==
Aguascalientes first began operating a state-run television service on October 12, 1976; te first broadcast aired was on November 17 of that year. The local transmitter for the Televisión de la República Mexicana network (later reorganized into Imevisión), on channel 10, was used to broadcast Televisión Cultural de Aguascalientes for two hours a day. The original studios were located in the Teatro Morelos and used equipment originally purchased to broadcast the 1968 Summer Olympics. This made it one of the first such regional production facilities integrated into TRM/Imevisión; the others, which launched in the late 1970s and early 1980s, served as the base for the creation of state networks across the country. On October 4, 1986, the state government made its final broadcasts on channel 10, and the next year, it received the permit for XHCGA-TV on channel 6, which also began operating from new studios alongside state-owned radio station XENM-AM 1320.

It is operated by Radio y Televisión de Aguascalientes (Radio and Television of Aguascalientes) as an internationally recognized cultural channel with an emphasis on Aguascalientes content and local television production. Its stated mission is to communicate, to inform, to educate, to entertain and promote human development.

In 2015, XHCGA applied for authorization to build a digital television station, XHCGA-TDT channel 26, which came to air on May 4, 2015. XHCGA began branding as channel 26 in December 2015. During parts of 2015, 2016 and 2017, XHCGA programming was heard on the radio on XHNM-FM 98.1 "Teleradio", which signed on in August 2015.

A failure to file a timely renewal led to the Federal Telecommunications Institute (IFT) awarding a new concession, with the new templated call sign XHCPAG-TDT, to the state government starting on January 1, 2022. The call sign on the new concession was changed to XHCGA-TDT on September 29, 2022.

== Digital television ==
XHCGA is authorized to broadcast a television service known as "AGS TV" on digital subchannel 26.2. In actuality, this station is UAA TV, the television service of the Universidad Autónoma de Aguascalientes, which began broadcasting over XHCGA on August 7, 2017.

== See also ==
- Television stations in Aguascalientes
- List of television stations in Mexico
- List of radio stations in Aguascalientes
- List of television networks in Mexico
