= XHUARO-FM =

Community radio station in Pátzcuaro, Michoacán

Pátzcuaro, Michoacán; Mexico
- Frequency: 107.7 MHz
- Branding: Románti-Ka 107.7 FM

Programming
- Format: Noncommercial community radio (romantic)

Ownership
- Owner: Pátzcuaro en Comunidad, A.C.

History
- First air date: June 2018
- Call sign meaning: PátzcUARO

Technical information
- Class: A
- ERP: 3 kW
- HAAT: -74.9 m
- Transmitter coordinates: 19°30′52.7″N 101°36′00.7″W

XHUARO-FM is a community radio station in Pátzcuaro, Michoacán, broadcasting on 107.7 FM. XHUARO is owned by Pátzcuaro en Comunidad, A.C.

== History ==
XHUARO received its social community concession in December 2017 and went on the air in June 2018.
