= XHMN-FM =

Radio station in Monterrey, Nuevo León, Mexico

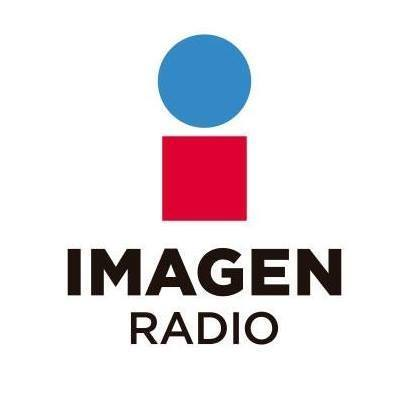
- San Pedro Garza García-Monterrey, Nuevo León; Mexico
- Broadcast area: Monterrey, Nuevo León
- Frequency: 107.7 FM
- Branding: Imagen Radio

Programming
- Format: News/talk

Ownership
- Owner: Grupo Imagen; (GIM Televisión Nacional, S.A. de C.V.)
- Sister stations: XHCTMY-TDT

History
- First air date: April 16, 1977 (concession)
- Call sign meaning: Monterrey, Nuevo León

Technical information
- Licensing authority: CRT
- Class: B
- ERP: 77,000 watts
- HAAT: 275.9 meters (905 ft)
- Transmitter coordinates: 25°37′31.7″N 100°19′00.9″W

Links
- Website: www.imagenmonterrey.mx

XHMN-FM is a radio station on 107.7 FM in Monterrey, Nuevo León. Mexico. The station is owned by Grupo Imagen and carries its talk format. The transmitter is located atop Cerro del Mirador.

== History ==
XHMN began with a concession issued on April 16, 1977, to Ernesto Hinojosa Subeldía; originally, the station known was "Stereo Siete". In 2001, the station was sold to Imagen.
