= XHCHAL-FM =

Community radio station in Chalco, State of Mexico

Chalco de Díaz Covarrubias, State of Mexico; Mexico
- Frequency: 98.9 FM
- Branding: Contacto

Programming
- Format: Community radio

Ownership
- Owner: Comunicaciones en Contacto, Cultura y Bienestar Social, A.C.

History
- First air date: 2017 (social community concession)
- Call sign meaning: CHALco

Technical information
- Class: A
- ERP: 3 kW
- HAAT: -89.0 m
- Transmitter coordinates: 19°15′42.53″N 98°53′51.49″W

Links
- Website: XHCHAL-FM on Facebook

XHCHAL-FM is a community radio station on 98.9 FM in Chalco de Díaz Covarrubias, State of Mexico. It is known as Contacto and owned by the civil association Comunicaciones en Contacto, Cultura y Bienestar Social, A.C.

== History ==
XHCHAL was approved for its concession on September 6, 2017. The frequency had been applied for on May 9, 2016.
