= WLEM =

- Emporium, Pennsylvania; United States
- Frequency: 1250 kHz

Programming
- Format: Classic hits

Ownership
- Owner: Salter Communications, Inc.
- Sister stations: WQKY

History
- First air date: 1958

Technical information
- Licensing authority: FCC
- Facility ID: 53581
- Class: D
- Power: 2,500 watts daytime 30 watts nighttime
- Transmitter coordinates: 41°30′22.23″N 78°13′2.0″W

Links
- Public license information: Public file; LMS

WLEM (1250 AM) is a commercial AM radio station licensed to serve Emporium, Pennsylvania. The station is owned by Salter Communications, Inc. and broadcasts a classic hits format.

== History ==
The groundwork for WLEM was first laid on November 27, 1957, when the construction permit was first issued to Cameron Manufacturing Corporation, following the filing of the application on March 12, 1957.

WLEM was first licensed April 15, 1958. In these early years, WLEM broadcast from the Hotel Warner on Second Street in downtown Emporium, later moving to 145 East Fourth Street, and then to 27 East Fourth Street, where they remained until 2024. The station operates from a location in Saint Mary's today.

In May 1959, Cameron Manufacturing Corporation transferred control of the station to Emporium Broadcasting Company. James Spotts was company president and Dean Close served as general manager. Spotts continued to serve in this role until his death in 1970, when the license was transferred to his estate, and then again to his wife Anne.

In June 1976, the station applied to increase its full daytime power from 1,000 to 5,000 watts. That application was dismissed in 1980, but the FCC did later allow WLEM to increase its power to its current level of 2,500 watts, though retaining its daytime-only operational status.

Emporium Broadcasting applied for an FM frequency in 1982. The license was granted the following year and WQKY signed on in 1985, simulcasting WLEM 100 percent, allowing Emporium to continue to have radio service at night after WLEM was required to sign off at sunset.

Towards the end of the 1980's, WLEM received 24 hour broadcasting rights, allowing it to operate at a reduced power of 30 watts after local sunset. However, ownership expanded the station's broadcast day to only 16 hours daily, with the station signing off at 10pm.

In 1993, Emporium Broadcasting sold WLEM and WQKY to Pittsburgh-based Priority Communications - licensee of WDSN in Reynoldsville - for $125,000. Programming was separated between the two stations, with WLEM retaining its longtime country format and WQKY adopting an oldies format.

WLEM and WQYX were then sold to its present owner, Salter Communications, on November 9, 2006. The purchase price was $700,000.
