= XHSCBS-FM =

Community radio station in Tarandacuao, Guanajuato

Tarandacuao, Guanajuato; Mexico
- Frequency: 98.9 FM
- Branding: Enlace Taranda

Programming
- Format: Community radio

Ownership
- Owner: Enlace Taranda, A.C.

History
- First air date: November 2018
- Call sign meaning: (templated callsign)

Technical information
- Class: D
- ERP: 24 watts
- HAAT: -118.2 meters
- Transmitter coordinates: 20°02′2.26″N 100°31′03.11″W

Links
- Website: XHSCBS-FM on Facebook

XHSCBS-FM is a community radio station on 98.9 FM in Tarandacuao, Guanajuato. The station is owned by the civil association Enlace Taranda, A.C.

== History ==
Enlace Taranda filed for a community station on May 13, 2016. The station was awarded on April 25, 2018.
