= XHCMN-FM =

Radio station in Ciudad del Carmen, Campeche, Mexico

- Ciudad del Carmen, Campeche; Mexico
- Frequency: 98.9 FM
- Branding: Máxima

Programming
- Format: Pop

Ownership
- Owner: Radio, S.A.; (Promotora de Radio XHCMN-FM, S.A. de C.V.)

History
- First air date: August 27, 1991 (concession)
- Call sign meaning: CarMeN

Technical information
- ERP: 30 kW

Links
- Webcast: Listen live
- Website: maxplay.com.mx

XHCMN-FM is a radio station on 98.9 FM in Ciudad del Carmen, Campeche, Mexico. The station is owned by Radio S.A. and carries its Máxima pop format.

== History ==
Previous logo

XHCMN was the first FM radio station in Ciudad del Carmen, awarded to Olga Rosa Bolaños López on August 27, 1991. It was sold to its current concessionaire in 1999 and the concession expired on August 27, 2018 without renewal.
