= XHACB-FM =

Radio station in Ciudad Delicias, Chihuahua

- Ciudad Delicias, Chihuahua; Mexico
- Broadcast area: Ciudad Delicias, Chihuahua
- Branding: La Lupe

Programming
- Format: Grupera

Ownership
- Owner: Radiza; (Radiza, S.A. de C.V.)

History
- First air date: September 12, 1977

Technical information
- Licensing authority: CRT
- Class: B1
- ERP: 25 kW
- HAAT: 86.6 m (284 ft)
- Transmitter coordinates: 28°11′24″N 105°24′02″W

XHACB-FM is a radio station on 98.9 FM in Ciudad Delicias, Chihuahua. The station is owned by Radiza and known as La Lupe with a grupera format.

== History ==
XHACB began as XEACB-AM 660. It was owned by Roberto Díaz García, founder of Radiza, and signed on September 12, 1977.

It migrated to FM in 2011.
