= El Terrero de la Labor =

Human settlement in Mexico

Coordinates: 22°02′N 102°40′W

El Terrero de la Labor is a small rural town located in the municipality of Calvillo, in the state of Aguascalientes, Mexico, coordinates: Latitude 22.024722 Longitude -102.671944. Its population is officially 414, but varies due to seasonal emigration to the United States, mainly towards the states of Oklahoma, Illinois, and California. It is situated between the towns of Palo Alto de la Labor and Puerta de Fragua (also known as La Presa de la Codorniz and La Fragua).
