= XHAMO-FM =

Radio station in Irapuato, Guanajuato, Mexico

Irapuato, Guanajuato; Mexico
- Frequency: 98.9 FM
- Branding: La 98.9

Programming
- Format: Spanish adult contemporary

Ownership
- Owner: Radio Grupo Antonio Contreras; (Radio Amor, S.A. de C.V.)

History
- First air date: August 21, 1981 (concession)
- Call sign meaning: Station was once known as Radio Amor

Technical information
- ERP: 3 kW
- Transmitter coordinates: 20°37′54.39″N 101°21′41.27″W

Links
- Webcast: Listen live
- Website: exitos989.com

XHAMO-FM is a radio station on 98.9 FM in Irapuato, Guanajuato, Mexico. XHAMO is owned by Radio Grupo Antonio Contreras and carries an adult contemporary format known as La 98.9.

== History ==
XHAMO began as XEAMO-AM 870, a daytime-only station owned by Silvestre Razo Arredondo. It was sold to the current concessionaire in 1993 and cleared to migrate to FM in 2012.

Logo as "Exitos 98.9"
