= Snyder Independent School District =

School district in Texas

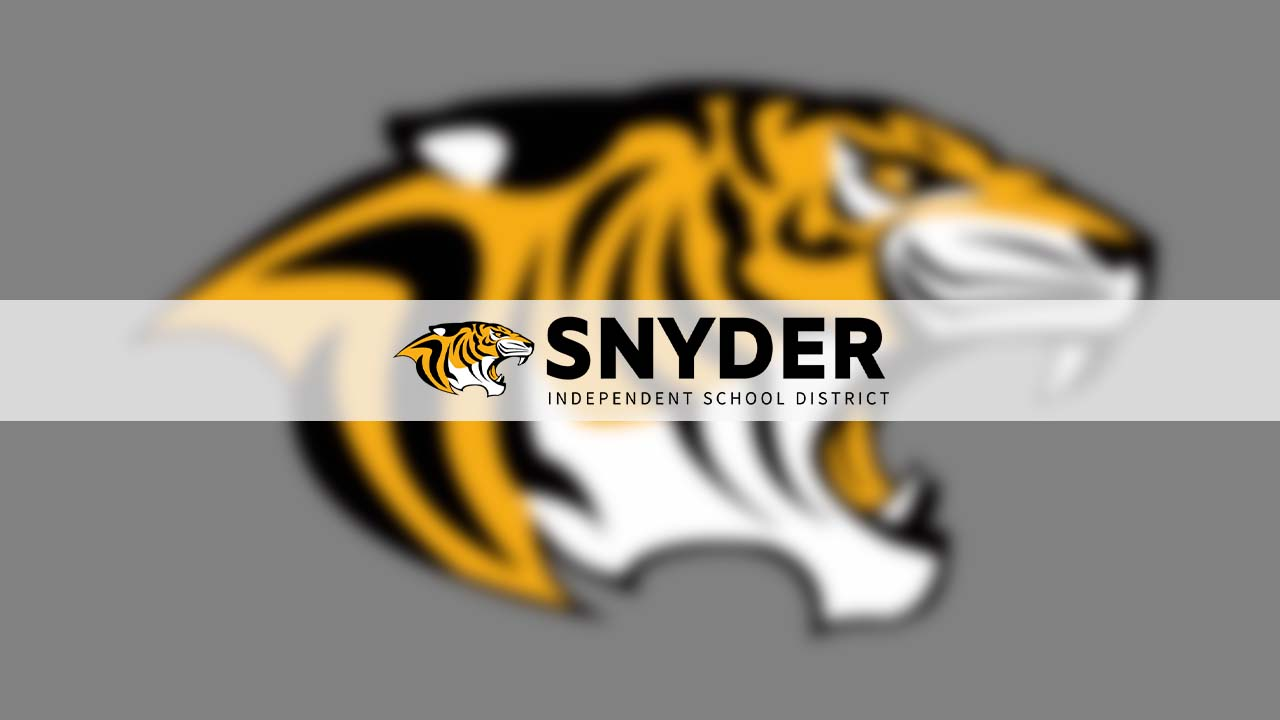

Address
- 2901 37th Avenue Snyder, Scurry County, Texas, 79549; United States

District information
- Type: Public
- Grades: K–12
- Superintendent: Jessica Gore
- NCES District ID: 4840650
- District ID: TX-208902

Students and staff
- Students: 2,560 (2022-2023)
- Teachers: 195.08 (on an FTE basis)
- Student–teacher ratio: 13.12

Other information
- Website: www.snyderisd.net

Snyder Independent School District (SISD) is a K–12 public school district in Snyder, Texas. As of 2017, the district comprises four schools, serving a total of 2,558 students. The demographic makeup of Snyder ISD reflects many backgrounds, with a minority enrollment accounting for 70% of the student body. Snyder ISD faces challenges among some students, with 49.6% identified as economically disadvantaged. It is located in Scurry County, Texas. The district serves students from Kent and Mitchell counties, as well as students from Hermleigh, Ira, and Roby.

In 2009, the Texas Education Agency assessed the school district and assigned it an academic rating of "acceptable."

== History ==
On July 1, 1990, the district absorbed a portion of the Hobbs Independent School District.

In 2019 the Texas Education Agency announced it would take control of the district, vacating the elected board.

== Schools ==
- Snyder High School (Grades 9-12)
- Snyder Junior High School (Grades 6-8)
- Snyder Intermediate School (Grades 4-5)
- Snyder Primary School (Grades PK-3)
