= Calvillo Municipality =

Municipality in Aguascalientes, Mexico

Calvillo
- Municipality
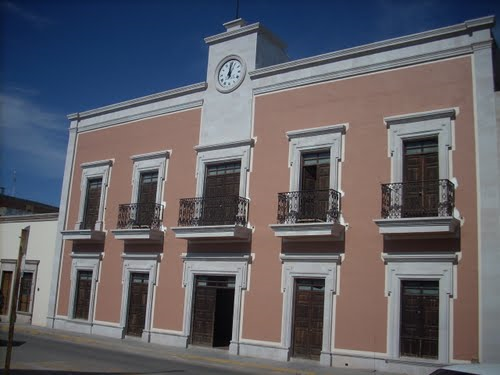
- Municipal Palace

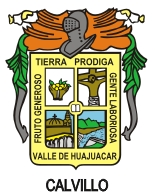
- Coat of arms

- Municipality location in Aguascalientes

- Location in Mexico
- Coordinates: 21°51′N 102°43′W
- Country: Mexico
- State: Aguascalientes
- Municipal seat: Calvillo

Government
  - Federal electoral district: Aguascalientes's 1st

Area
  - Total: 931.62 km^{2} (359.70 sq mi)

Population (2020)
  - Total: 58,250
  - Density: 62.53/km^{2} (161.9/sq mi)

Calvillo (Spanish: [kalˈβiʝo]) is a municipality in the Mexican state of Aguascalientes. The city of Calvillo, the second largest in the state, serves as the municipal seat. It is located to the western part of the state, at about 52 kilometers of the city of Aguascalientes. It stands at 21°51′N 102°43′W in the southwestern corner of the state. It is bounded by Jalisco and Zacatecas. The municipality, which has an area of 931.26 km^{2} (359.56 sq mi), reported a population of 58,250 by 2020. The town of Ojocaliente is another significant community in the municipality. Calvillo is one of the richest, most prosperous municipalities in Aguascalientes.

During the French invasion of Mexico, the north part of the valley of Huajuacar in which Calvillo lays, was occupied by the French. At the time, they intermixed with the descendants of Spaniards which already inhabited the south part of the valley. This fact made Calvillo the municipality with most Caucasian-origin inhabitants in the state, compared with the other municipalities.

Calvillo is the largest guava producer in Mexico and famous for its confectionery and liqueurs made from this fruit which can be sampled at the Guava Fair held during the first week of December.

The economy in Calvillo is centered on the guava, although there is other agriculture and a great deal of commerce. Calvillo is better known as the world capital of the guava.

== Demographics ==
Historical population
Year	Pop.	±%
2010	54,136	—
2015	56,048	+3.5%
2020	58,250	+3.9%

As of 2010, the municipality had a total population of 54,136.

As of 2010, the city of Calvillo had a population of 19,742. Other than the city of Calvillo, the municipality had 307 localities, the largest of which (with 2010 populations in parentheses) were: Ojocaliente (6,914), classified as urban, and El Cuervero (Cuerveros) (2,350), Valle Huejúcar (Fraccionamiento Popular) (1,991), La Labor (1,988), Malpaso (1,697), San Tadeo (1,507), Chiquihuitero (San Isidro) (1,318), La Panadera (1,212), Mesa Grande (1,149), Jaltiche de Arriba (1,114), and Crucero las Pilas (1,031), classified as rural.

== Notable people ==
- José María Bocanegra, president of Mexico from December 18 to December 23, 1829
