= WLWR-LP =

- Marinette, Wisconsin; United States
- Frequency: 107.7 MHz

Ownership
- Owner: Marinette Radio Association

Technical information
- Licensing authority: FCC
- Facility ID: 131536
- Class: L1
- ERP: 100 watts
- HAAT: 29.7 meters (97 ft)
- Transmitter coordinates: 45°8′52.00″N 87°41′37.00″W

Links
- Public license information: LMS

WLWR-LP (107.7 FM) is a radio station licensed to Marinette, Wisconsin, United States. The station is currently owned by Marinette Radio Association.
