= KSNY-FM =

Coordinates: 32.891°N 101.108°W

- Snyder, Texas; United States
- Broadcast area: Snyder, Texas
- Frequency: 101.5 MHz
- Branding: Big Star 101.5

Programming
- Format: Country
- Affiliations: ABC Radio, Paul Harvey, Mike Huckabee

Ownership
- Owner: Snyder Broadcasting

History
- First air date: 1980 (at 101.7)
- Former frequencies: 101.7 MHz (1980-2000s)
- Call sign meaning: K SNYder

Technical information
- Licensing authority: FCC
- Facility ID: 60711
- Class: C1
- ERP: 100,000 watts
- HAAT: 179 meters (587 ft)

Links
- Public license information: Public file; LMS
- Website: KSNY FM

KSNY-FM (101.5 FM, "Big Star 101.5") is the companion station to KSNY (AM). The station began in 1980 at 101.7 MHz as 'FM-102' with an easy listening format. The station was automated in the beginning until its move to 101.5 and the format change to country. The station now has coverage in the Big Spring and Abilene markets. In 2001, KSNY began a sister station, 98.9 KLYD "Real Rock." but it was automated until 2003.

== History ==
The station's studios moved from KSNY drive, west of town on Ave. R, to the old Texas Utilities building next to the "SCAT" TV Cable building in 2002.

The station signed on the air on September 2, 1980, with an easy listening format. In 1984, the station upgraded its format to adult contemporary for the next seven years until flipping to classic rock in 1991. It was initially a 3,000-watt class A on 101.7, transmitting from the AM tower at the former studios. The station upgraded its class to C2 in the 1990s and C1 on 101.5 in the early 2000s.

The station added a sister station for rock listeners, KLYD 98.9, in 2001, but it was fully automated until 2003.

A complete revamp in 2015 rebranded KSNY-FM to the now, widely known and award-winning, Big Star 101.5 KSNY-FM with the refreshed Texas Country format, The Lyd 98.9 KLYD-FM, and separate from its FM counterpart, a brand new sports talk CBS affiliate, The Zone 1450 KSNY-AM, also a Texas Rangers affiliated station.

The DJs for the station become, in effect, local celebrities, with the recent stand-outs being award-winning DJ Kayla-Kay, Curt Rinehart of "The Red Dirt Ride", Multi award-winning legend "Suzie Q", Sheree Stone, "The Golden Child" Cody Christopher, Stumpy - KLYD Disc Jockey and Main Host on nationally recognized "Gooney in the Morning" with Eric, Lenny & Taquito of Paducah, Tx, Magic Johnson (not that one), Bruce Bell, "Shotgun-Kellie" Taylor, Becca Grey, Leslie Summers, Colby James, Brooks Moon, Gracie James, Blue Patrick, and "The Legend" James Mac.
