= KZXK =

- Doney Park, Arizona; United States
- Broadcast area: Flagstaff, Arizona
- Frequency: 98.9 MHz
- Branding: 95.5 & 98.9 KZXK

Programming
- Format: Classic rock

Ownership
- Owner: Ted Tucker; (Cochise Broadcasting, LLC)

History
- First air date: 2011

Technical information
- Licensing authority: FCC
- Facility ID: 166050
- Class: C2
- ERP: 560 watts K238BL: 235 watts
- HAAT: 610 meters (2,000 ft); K238BL: 607 meters (1,991 ft)
- Transmitter coordinates: 35°14′26″N 111°35′51″W
- Repeater: 95.5 K238BL (Flagstaff)

Links
- Public license information: Public file; LMS

KZXK (98.9 FM) is a radio station licensed to Doney Park, Arizona, United States. The station airs a commercial-free rock music format. The station is owned by Cochise Broadcasting, LLC.

== Format ==
The station format is late–1960s to late–1980s album rock. It is fully automated, has no DJs and does not play any commercial announcements other than its own station identification.

== History ==
KZXK was powered-on by Ted Tucker, a former hospital pharmacist and broadcast-radio engineer, who owns several radio stations in throughout the Western United States under the corporate names "Desert West Air Ranchers Corporation" and "Cochise Broadcasting, LLC".

The station license was granted by the Federal Communications Commission on December 2, 2009 and, according to a published report, began operations on April 7, 2010.

The station holds a U.S. Federal Communications Commission construction permit to upgrade to a C2 class with a power increase to 560 watts ERP. Source: FCC Engineering ('FMQ') Database.
