= WQKY =

- Emporium, Pennsylvania; United States
- Frequency: 98.9 MHz
- Branding: The River 98.9

Programming
- Format: Classic hits

Ownership
- Owner: Salter Communications, Inc.
- Sister stations: WLEM

History
- First air date: 1985 (at 92.7)
- Former frequencies: 92.7 MHz (1983–1996)

Technical information
- Licensing authority: FCC
- Facility ID: 53582
- Class: A
- ERP: 2,000 watts
- HAAT: 167 meters (548 ft)
- Transmitter coordinates: 41°29′32.2″N 78°15′18.0″W

Links
- Public license information: Public file; LMS
- Webcast: Listen live
- Website: www.theriver989.com

WQKY (98.9 FM, "The River 98.9") is a commercial FM radio station licensed to serve Emporium, Pennsylvania. The station is owned by Salter Communications, Inc. and broadcasts a classic hits format. The station's transmitter facilities are located off Whittimore Road on the outskirts of Emporium.

== History ==
The Federal Communications Commission granted Emporium Broadcasting Company a construction permit for the station on April 27, 1983 with the WQKY call sign. Originally assigned to 92.7 MHz, the FCC granted the station its first license on August 6, 1985.

For much of its early years, WQKY simulcast full-time the full-service country music format of its AM sister, WLEM, despite having dissimilar call letters. The arrangement allowed listeners to enjoy full-service radio after sunset, when WLEM was mandated to sign off prior to getting nighttime broadcasting authorization by the end of the 1980s.

The FCC granted a transfer of the station's license from Emporium Broadcasting to Priority Communications, Inc. on December 20, 1993. On July 13, 1994, the FCC granted the station a construction permit to change the station's frequency to 98.9 MHz (Channel 255A) followed by a new license granted on September 11, 1996. Upon the change in ownership, programming was separated between WLEM and WQKY, with the latter adopting an oldies format.

The FCC granted a transfer of the station's license to Salter Communications, Inc. on November 9, 2006. The sale consummated on November 22, 2006. WQKY then changed its format from oldies to adult contemporary.

The station has since adopted a classic hits format and the moniker "The River 98-9", and maintains a secondary office in Franklin Center on South St. Mary's Street in St. Mary's.
