= KCOQ (FM) =

- Steamboat Springs, Colorado; United States
- Broadcast area: Steamboat Springs, Colorado
- Frequency: 98.9 MHz
- Branding: 98.9 The River

Programming
- Format: Classic rock

Ownership
- Owner: Radio Partners LLC

History
- First air date: 2012 (as KTYV)
- Former call signs: KTYV (2012–2018)

Technical information
- Licensing authority: FCC
- Facility ID: 88360
- Class: A
- ERP: 800 watts
- HAAT: 183 meters (600 ft)
- Transmitter coordinates: 40°27′43″N 106°50′58″W

Links
- Public license information: Public file; LMS
- Webcast: Listen live
- Website: www.steamboatradio.com/kcoq-the-river-98-9-album-rock/

KCOQ (98.9 FM) is a radio station licensed to Steamboat Springs, Colorado, United States. The station broadcasts a classic rock format and is owned by Radio Partners LLC.

On June 18, 2018, KCOQ changed their format from sports to classic rock, branded as "98.9 The River".

The station is an affiliate of the syndicated Pink Floyd program "Floydian Slip."
