= WVOY-LP =

- Jefferson, South Carolina; United States
- Frequency: 98.9 MHz

Programming
- Format: Religious

Ownership
- Owner: The Church of God, Inc. Emmanuel

Technical information
- Licensing authority: FCC
- Facility ID: 131885
- Class: L1
- ERP: 58 watts
- HAAT: 39.5 meters (130 ft)
- Transmitter coordinates: 34°40′59″N 80°22′57″W

Links
- Public license information: LMS

WVOY-LP (98.9 FM) is a low-power radio station broadcasting a religious music format. Licensed to Jefferson, South Carolina, United States, the station is currently owned by The Church of God, Inc. Emmanuel.
