= KSNY (AM) =

Coordinates: 32°43′33″N 100°56′30″W

- Snyder, Texas; United States
- Broadcast area: Colorado City, Texas; Rotan, Texas
- Frequency: 1450 kHz
- Branding: The Zone

Programming
- Format: Sports
- Affiliations: Infinity Sports Network

Ownership
- Owner: Snyder Broadcasting
- Sister stations: KSNY-FM

History
- First air date: 1949
- Call sign meaning: K SNYder

Technical information
- Licensing authority: FCC
- Facility ID: 60710
- Class: C
- Power: 1,000 watts

Links
- Public license information: Public file; LMS
- Website: KSNY Online

KSNY (1450 AM, "The Zone") is the first radio station to air in Snyder, Texas. Before the advent of FM as a mainstream medium, KSNY adopted a block format, meaning different formats at different times of the day.

In the 1970s, KSNY started the day with News and Talk, then in the mornings played country music, in the afternoons Adult Contemporary, and at night Top 40 formats. A Latin format with a Spanish-speaking announcer aired on Sunday evenings until 1980, and then moved to weeknights from 6—7 pm. The station also played Easy Listening and Gospel formats on Sunday mornings. KSNY was an affiliate of the Texas State Network, and most of its newscasts mirrored television airings (noon, 6:00, and 10:00).

It was popular for the liner aired at 10:00 every night "It's Ten p.m., Do you know where your children are?". For many years, the station was owned partly by the local manager Mel Z. Gilbert and the Wendell Mayes interests (KCRS Midland).

== Trivia ==
The station's studios moved from KSNY Drive, west of town, into the former Texas Utilities building next to the "SCAT" TV Cable building north of downtown Snyder square around 2002.

KSNY-AM-FM was sold to Bill Jamar of Brownwood, Texas in 1994. It was previously owned by Paula Gilbert, Wendell Mayes, Jr., and Bill Jamar. Richie Cash was the DJ of the 1990s under Paula and Paul Gilbert.
