= WTPM (FM) =

- Aguadilla, Puerto Rico; Puerto Rico
- Broadcast area: Puerto Rico
- Frequency: 92.9 MHz
- Branding: Paraiso 92

Programming
- Format: Religious

Ownership
- Owner: Corporation of the Seventh Day Adventists of West Puerto Rico; (Corp. of the Seventh Day Adventists of West PR)
- Sister stations: WTPM-LD

History
- First air date: 1971; 55 years ago
- Call sign meaning: Tu Paraiso Musical

Technical information
- Licensing authority: FCC
- Facility ID: 13952
- Class: B
- ERP: 50,000 watts
- HAAT: 876.0 meters (2,874.0 ft)
- Transmitter coordinates: 18°18′47″N 67°11′55.9″W

Links
- Public license information: Public file; LMS
- Webcast: Listen Live
- Website: wtpm.org

WTPM (92.9 MHz), branded on-air as Paraiso 92, is an FM radio station broadcasting a Religious format. Licensed to Aguadilla, Puerto Rico, it serves the Puerto Rico area. The station is currently owned by the Corporation of the Seventh-day Adventists of West Puerto Rico.

== See also ==
- WZOL: Seventh-Day Adventist radio station in San Juan, Puerto Rico
