= WMRS =

- Monticello, Indiana; United States
- Frequency: 107.7 MHz
- Branding: Sunny 107.7

Programming
- Format: Adult Contemporary
- Affiliations: Fox News Radio; WLFI-TV; Indianapolis Motor Speedway Radio Network

Ownership
- Owner: Monticello Community Radio, Inc.

History
- First air date: March 1989

Technical information
- Facility ID: 24091
- Class: A
- ERP: 2,450 watts
- HAAT: 157 meters (515 ft)
- Transmitter coordinates: 40°40′8.00″N 86°41′44.00″W

Links
- Webcast: Listen Live
- Website: wmrsradio.com

WMRS Radio went on the air in March 1989 filling a void left by Power 95 formerly WVTL when WVTL left the Monticello, Indiana community in the mid-1980s. WMRS plays music of the 1970s, 1980s, 1990s, and today.

WMRS is the home of Super Trading Post and, during the Summer season, "TGIF" Pool Party Friday. WMRS Radio has won five Crystal Communicator Awards of Excellence for its sports broadcasts.

WMRS/Sunny 107.7 FM was awarded Station of the Year honors during the Indiana Broadcasters Association 19th Annual Spectrum Awards in market 3. WMRS Radio provides the area with up-to-the-minute local news, sports, weather, and national news at the top of nearly every hour.

Radio sponsors the Monticello citywide Holiday Treasure Hunt, a Turkey giveaway, a Christmas Tree giveaway, a Mother's Day Contest, the Touch of Elegance Bridal Show, and the Lakes Area Home and Garden Show and broadcasts live at www.wmrsradio.com.

Former logo
