= WZOL =

Radio station licensed to San Juan, Puerto Rico

- Las Piedras, Puerto Rico; Puerto Rico
- Broadcast area: San Juan, Puerto Rico
- Frequency: 98.3 MHz
- Branding: Radio Sol 98.3

Programming
- Format: Religious adventist

Ownership
- Owner: Seventh-Day Adventists of Eastern Puerto Rico Association; (Radio Sol 92, WZOL, Inc.)

History
- First air date: 1978; 48 years ago
- Former call signs: WZVS-FM (1978–1981); WLID (1981–1985); WSAN (1985–2005); WTTP (2005–2007); WYAS (2007–2009)
- Former frequencies: 98.9 MHz (1978–2012)

Technical information
- Licensing authority: FCC
- Facility ID: 8898
- Class: B
- ERP: 50,830 watts
- HAAT: 800.0 meters (2,624.7 ft)
- Transmitter coordinates: 18°16′40.8″N 65°51′11.5″W
- Translator: 93.3 W227CV 93.3 (San Lorenzo)
- Repeater: 98.3 WZOL-FM3 (Fajardo)

Links
- Public license information: Public file; LMS
- Website: radiosol.org

WZOL (98.3 FM), branded on-air as Radio Sol 98.3, is a radio station licensed to San Juan, Puerto Rico. The station is currently owned by The Seventh-Day Avdentists of Eastern Puerto Rico Association & its licensee is Radio Sol 92, WZOL, Inc. WZOL is simulcasting on WZOL-FM3, licensed to Fajardo, Puerto Rico, and W227CV 93.3 FM licensed to San Lorenzo, Puerto Rico, United States.

== Translator stations ==
Broadcast translator for WZOL
Call sign	Frequency	City of license	FID	ERP (W)	Class	FCC info
W227CV	93.3 FM	San Lorenzo, Puerto Rico	157296	250	D	LMS

== In popular culture ==
- The callsign WZOL was featured in Episode 9 of Poker Face, used as an independent TV station in Denver, Colorado, the station reports on the finding of a missing person, alongside 2 people, one of them being the misidentified Charlie Cale.

== See also ==
- WTPM (FM): Seventh-Day Adventist radio station in Aguadilla, Puerto Rico,
