= KURA-LP =

- Ouray, Colorado; United States
- Frequency: 98.9 MHz

Ownership
- Owner: Ouray School District R1

Technical information
- Licensing authority: FCC
- Facility ID: 131909
- Class: L1
- ERP: 100 watts
- HAAT: −78.4 meters (−257 ft)
- Transmitter coordinates: 38°2′23″N 107°40′22″W

Links
- Public license information: LMS
- Webcast: Listen live

KURA-LP (98.9 FM) is a radio station licensed to Ouray, Colorado, United States. The station is currently owned by Ouray School District R1.
