= WAIY-LP =

- Belchertown, Massachusetts; United States
- Frequency: 107.7 MHz
- Branding: The Way Radio

Programming
- Format: Contemporary Inspirational

Ownership
- Owner: Dwight Chapel Inc.

Technical information
- Licensing authority: FCC
- Facility ID: 196208
- Class: L1
- ERP: 100 watts
- HAAT: 7 meters (23 ft)
- Transmitter coordinates: 42°20′54″N 72°28′4″W

Links
- Public license information: LMS
- Webcast: Listen live
- Website: waiy.org

WAIY-LP (107.7 FM) is a radio station licensed to serve the community of Belchertown, Massachusetts. The station is owned by Dwight Chapel Inc. It airs a contemporary inspirational music format.

The station was assigned the WAIY-LP call letters by the Federal Communications Commission on January 13, 2015.
