= KLMO-FM =

Dilley, Texas; United States
- Broadcast area: San Antonio area
- Frequency: 98.9 MHz
- Branding: K-Alamo KLMO Tejano 98.9 FM

Programming
- Format: Tejano

Ownership
- Owner: Dilley Broadcasters

History
- First air date: 2001
- Former call signs: KMOA (8/2000-10/2000, CP)
- Call sign meaning: LMO like Alamo

Technical information
- Licensing authority: FCC
- Facility ID: 16931
- Class: C1
- ERP: 92,000 watts
- HAAT: 220 m (722 ft)
- Transmitter coordinates: 28°56′34″N 99°16′47″W

Links
- Public license information: Public file; LMS
- Webcast: Listen Live
- Website: klmo989fm.com

KLMO-FM (98.9 FM) is a radio station broadcasting a Tejano format. Licensed to Dilley, Texas, United States, the station serves the San Antonio area. The station is currently owned by Dilley Broadcasters.

== History ==
The station was assigned the call letters KMOA on 2000-06-21. On 2000-10-27, the station changed its call sign to the current KLMO.
