= WPOV-LP =

- Vineland, New Jersey; United States
- Broadcast area: Vineland-Millville-Bridgeton
- Frequency: 107.7 MHz
- Branding: Ascend FM

Programming
- Format: Religious

Ownership
- Owner: Advantage Ministries, Inc

Technical information
- Licensing authority: FCC
- Facility ID: 134781
- Class: L1
- ERP: 35 watts
- HAAT: 50.0 meters (164.0 ft)
- Transmitter coordinates: 39°25′12.00″N 74°57′8.00″W

Links
- Public license information: LMS
- Website: ascendfm.com

WPOV-LP (107.7 FM, "Ascend FM") is a radio station broadcasting a religious format. Licensed to Vineland, New Jersey, United States, the station serves the Vineland-Millville-Bridgeton area. The station is currently owned by Advantage Ministries, Inc. The station is also available on 97.7 FM W249BY in Bridgeton, NJ. The station features contemporary Christian music throughout the day, plus encouraging words and teachings from local ministries.

The offices are in Millville, New Jersey.
