= KMKB-LP =

- Marfa, Texas; United States
- Frequency: 98.9 MHz
- Branding: "KMKB 98.9 FM"

Programming
- Format: Community radio

Ownership
- Owner: Casa Vida Corporation

History
- Former call signs: KKLK-LP (2007–2017)

Technical information
- Licensing authority: FCC
- Facility ID: 133266
- Class: L1
- ERP: 50 watts
- HAAT: −32 metres (−105 ft)
- Transmitter coordinates: 30.3128°N 104.0100°W

Links
- Public license information: LMS
- Webcast: Listen Live
- Website: Official Website

KMKB-LP (98.9 FM) is a radio station licensed to serve the community of Marfa, Texas. The station is owned by Casa Vida Corporation, and airs a community radio format.

The station was assigned the call sign KKLK-LP by the Federal Communications Commission on March 28, 2007. The station changed its call sign to KMKB-LP on June 23, 2017.
