= Snyder High School (Texas) =

Location
- 3801 Austin Ave. Snyder, Scurry County, Texas 79549-5226; United States; 32.7026°N 100.9292°W

Information
- Type: Public high school
- School district: Snyder Independent School District
- Principal: Aleida Juarez
- Teaching staff: 56.26 (FTE)
- Grades: 9-12
- Enrollment: 693 (2023-2024)
- Student to teacher ratio: 12.32
- Campus: Town: remote
- Colors: Black; Gold
- Athletics conference: UIL Class AAAA
- Mascot: Tiger/Lady Tiger
- Newspaper: Tiger's Tale
- Website: www.snyderisd.net

Snyder High School is a public high school located in the city of Snyder, Texas, United States and classified as a 4A school by the University Interscholastic League (UIL). It is a part of the Snyder Independent School District located in central Scurry County. In 2015, the school was rated "Met Standard" by the Texas Education Agency.

== History ==
Prior to 1953, high school facilities were held in an older location near 26th Street and Avenue M. The Class of 1953 was the final class to graduate from this site, which was later repurposed as Travis Junior High School. That building still stands today as a senior citizens center.

In the fall of 1953, Scurry County, which Snyder was recently appointed as the county chair, experienced an oil boom which drove many new residents to the city. As such, the town needed a new high school. Under the guidance of Snyder ISD superintendent, Dr. Robert L. Clinton, a new modern-for-its-time school was built including larger science labs, vocational spaces and athletic facilities.

In 1968, legendary theater educator, Jerry P. Worsham brought the Theater division of Snyder to new heights. Under his production, the school had focused more on the Fine Arts facilities. He led the school to 13 historic One Act play championships before retiring in 2000.

In the 1990's and 2000's, the school mainly focused on keeping up with the changing needs for a modern school as its 1953 structure needed updates. These updates were mainly minor and just included electrical and HVAC updates. A big change at this time was renaming the auditorium to Jerry P. Worsham Auditorium, named after the legendary theatrical director.

In 2011, a bond passed to build a new cafeteria on the south side of the building. The new cafeteria replaced the outdated one located on the west side of the school which was originally built in 1953 with the school. This was a major milestone in the 21st century improvement of Snyder High School.

== Athletics ==
The Snyder Tigers compete in these sports -

Volleyball, Cross Country, Football, Basketball, Powerlifting, Golf, Tennis, Track, Baseball, Softball & Soccer

=== State Titles ===
- Baseball -
  - 1983(4A), 2008(3A)
- Boys Golf -
  - 1986(4A), 1997(4A), 2003(3A), 2005(3A), 2006(3A)
- Girls Golf -
  - 1986(4A), 1997(4A), 2003(3A), 2005(3A), 2006(3A)
- Volleyball -
  - 1972(3A), 1978(4A), 1980(4A), 1981(4A), 1985(4A)

==== State Finalist ====
- Baseball -
  - 1960(3A)
- Boys Basketball -
  - 1980(3A)

== Theater ==
- One Act Play
  - 1968(3A), 1970(3A), 1971(3A), 1972(3A), 1976(3A), 1977(3A), 1979(3), 1982(4A), 1984(4A), 1985(4A), 1988(4A), 1993(4A), 1995(4A)

== Renovations and Improvements ==
- 2003-2004: HVAC upgrades
- 2005-2007: restroom, gym, window and lab renovations
- 2008-2014: turf installation on football field, Industrial Arts II project, indoor facilities, auditorium renovations and security entrances
- 2011: New cafeteria built on the south side of the school
- 2019-2021: controls update, unit replacement, roof replacement, stadium turf and track resurfacing

In 2025, Snyder ISD introduced the Bond Master Plan which was to modernize the outdated 1953 facilities. The Bond would apply to every school in the district, but would apply new construction and major renovations to the high school opposed to the minor HVAC, security fencing and plumbing improvements to the other schools. Included renovations in this plan are

- New Academic Building located in the empty west side space
- New Career and Technical Education (CTE) facility
- Renovate the Tiger Gymnasium and its locker rooms and build a new additional gymnasium with locker rooms on the north side
- New security fencing
- Improvement of Special Education and Life Skills facilities on the south side
- Renovate the front wing
  - Build a new student center and library
  - Renovate offices and front entrance
- New audio/visual and lighting to Worsham Auditorium
- Renovated Band Hall and Choir facilities

== Notable alumni ==
- Powers Boothe, actor
- Sonny Cumbie, football coach
- Hayward Clay, former NFL player
- Tony Degrate, former NFL player
- Jack Spikes, former NFL player
