= XHNX-FM =

Radio station in Toluca, State of Mexico

Toluca, State of México; Mexico
- Frequency: 98.9 MHz
- Branding: Super Stereo Miled

Programming
- Format: Regional Mexican

Ownership
- Owner: Grupo Miled; (Miled FM, S.A. de C.V.)

History
- First air date: October 28, 1968

Technical information
- ERP: 3.19 kW

Links
- Webcast: http://miledradio.miledmusic.com/toluca/
- Website: www.miled.com

XHNX-FM is a radio station in Toluca, State of México, Mexico. It is one of several stations in the State of Mexico known as Super Stereo Miled.

== History ==
XHNX went on air at 6pm on October 28, 1968, making it the first FM station in the State of Mexico. Miled Libien Kahui formally received its concession on November 30, 1971.
