= Nest Radio =

Coordinates: 37.681966°S 144.9418169°E

Nest Radio (3NOW)
- Hadfield, Victoria; Australia
- Broadcast area: Melbourne North West RA1: City of Merri-bek, City of Hume
- Frequency: 98.9 MHz

Programming
- Languages: English, others
- Format: Community

Ownership
- Owner: Nest Radio Inc.

History
- First air date: 8 April 1993 (full-time transmission)
- Former names: North West FM (1993–2026)
- Call sign meaning: "NOW" for "North West"

Technical information
- Licensing authority: ACMA
- ERP: 328 watts

Links
- Public licence information: Profile
- Website: nest.radio

Nest Radio (call sign 3NOW) is a community radio station based in Hadfield, a suburb of north west Melbourne, Australia. Its broadcast area covers the City of Merri-bek and City of Hume.

== Programs ==
Nest Radio presents a wide variety of programs. The nature of the station - being an open membership and participation driven community broadcast - provides for a mixture of music genre, spoken word topics, local sport and ethnic (non-English) languages.

A variety of religious programs are also present, considering the vast mix of immigrants from many parts of the world resident in the North Western region of Melbourne.

== History ==
Following a public meeting on 5 November 1987, the North West Community Radio Association was formally inaugurated and later incorporated in November 1988. The radio station's first test transmission was made from the Broadmeadows TAFE College in November 1988. The Department of Transport and Communications made a full-time licence available early in 1990. This was one of eight sub-metropolitan licences issued on the same day to broadcasting groups in various Melbourne suburbs. North West FM was the only applicant for the North Western Melbourne area licence. It took three years until permanent broadcasting commenced, when a transmitter licence was issued and full-time transmission commenced on 8 April 1993.

By the mid-2000s, North West FM was broadcasting from the Broadmeadows Town Hall. However, reception in some areas was curtailed in 2007 when the City of Hume completed construction on an adjacent six-storey council building. In 2009, the station applied to relocate its antenna to that building, but approval from nearby Essendon Airport was required for the relocation. The antenna was installed in 2012, only to be turned off after several hours when Hume complained of interference to council communications systems. Three years later, the council ordered the equipment removed,e even though the old equipment was only operating at 10 per cent power. In 2025, Hume council passed a resolution ordering officers to arrange a test broadcast from the Municipal Office Building or another suitable site.

In 2026, North West FM changed names to Nest Radio.
