= DWIS (Vigan) =

- Vigan; Philippines
- Broadcast area: Ilocos Sur and surrounding areas
- Frequency: 98.9 MHz

Programming
- Format: Silent

Ownership
- Owner: Southern Broadcasting Network

History
- First air date: 1979
- Last air date: February 25, 2018
- Former names: Mom's Radio (2002–2010, 2015-2018); DWIS (2010–2015)
- Call sign meaning: Ilocos Sur

Technical information
- Licensing authority: NTC

DWIS (98.9 FM) was a radio station owned and operated by Southern Broadcasting Network. It was shut down alongside DWSN on February 25, 2018.
