= XHUNO-FM =

Radio station in Aguascalientes, Aguascalientes, Mexico

- Aguascalientes, Aguascalientes; Mexico
- Broadcast area: Aguascalientes
- Frequency: 101.7 FM (HD Radio)
- Branding: Magia 101

Programming
- Format: Contemporary hit radio

Ownership
- Owner: Radiogrupo; (Radio Central, S.A. de C.V.)

History
- First air date: May 27, 1993 (concession)
- Call sign meaning: "Uno" (one in Spanish)

Technical information
- Licensing authority: CRT
- Class: C1
- ERP: 40,000 watts
- HAAT: 189.9 meters (623 ft)
- Transmitter coordinates: 21°55′08″N 102°15′44″W

Links
- Webcast: Magia 101 FM listen live
- Website: www.radiogrupo.com/Poderosa/xhuno.html

XHUNO-FM is a radio station in Aguascalientes, Aguascalientes, Mexico. It carries a contemporary hit radio format known as Magia 101.

In 2015, XHUNO was authorized for HD Radio alongside sister station XHUZ-FM.
