= List of television stations in Aguascalientes =

The following is a list of all CRT-licensed over-the-air television stations broadcasting in the Mexican state of Aguascalientes.

== List of television stations ==
RF	VC	Call sign	Location	Network/name	ERP	Concessionaire			
30	1	XHJCM-TDT	Aguascalientes; San Juan de los Lagos, Jal.	Azteca Uno (ADN Noticias)	15.89 kW; 25.22 kW	Televisión Azteca, S.A. de C.V.			
18	3	XHCTAG-TDT	Aguascalientes	Imagen Televisión (Excélsior TV)	100 kW	Cadena Tres I, S.A. de C.V.			
35	5	XHAG-TDT	Aguascalientes; Calvillo; Jalpa, Zac. Nochistlán, Zac.	El 5*	240 kW; 17 kW; 23 kW; 29 kW	Radio Televisión			
29	7	XHLGA-TDT	Aguascalientes; San Juan de los Lagos, Jal.	Azteca 7 (A Más+)	15.91 kW; 25.26 kW	Televisión Azteca, S.A. de C.V.			
32	9	XHAGU-TDT	Aguascalientes	Nu9ve Aguascalientes	240 kW	Teleimagen del Noroeste			
7	11	XHCPAE-TDT	Aguascalientes	Canal Once (Once Niñas y Niños)		Instituto Politécnico Nacional			
15	14	XHSPRAG-TDT	Aguascalientes	SPR multiplex (11.1 Canal Once, 14.1 Canal Catorce, 14.2 Ingenio Tv, 20.1 TV UNAM, 22.1 Canal 22, 45.1 Canal del Congreso)	70.97 kW	Sistema Público de Radiodifusión del Estado Mexicano			
26	26	XHCGA-TDT	Aguascalientes	VA+ TV (UAA TV)	150 kW	Radio y Televisión de Aguascalientes; Gobierno del Estado de Aguascalientes; Universidad Autónoma de Aguascalientes			
10	8.1	XHZER-TDT	Aguascalientes	TeleZer		Grupo ZER			
XHCSCP-TDT	2.048	12	16.1	Canal 16	•	Martega Conexión Cultural, A.C.	Social	•	
Plan de los Romo (Rancho)
Plan de los Romo (Rancho)	XHCSAM-TDT	•	5	•	•	•	Michoacán Te Escucha, A.C.	Social	•
25	7	XHCVO-TDT	Calvillo	Azteca 7	4.23 kW	Televisión Azteca, S.A. de C.V.			
