= Calvillo =

Calvillo, Aguascalientes
- City
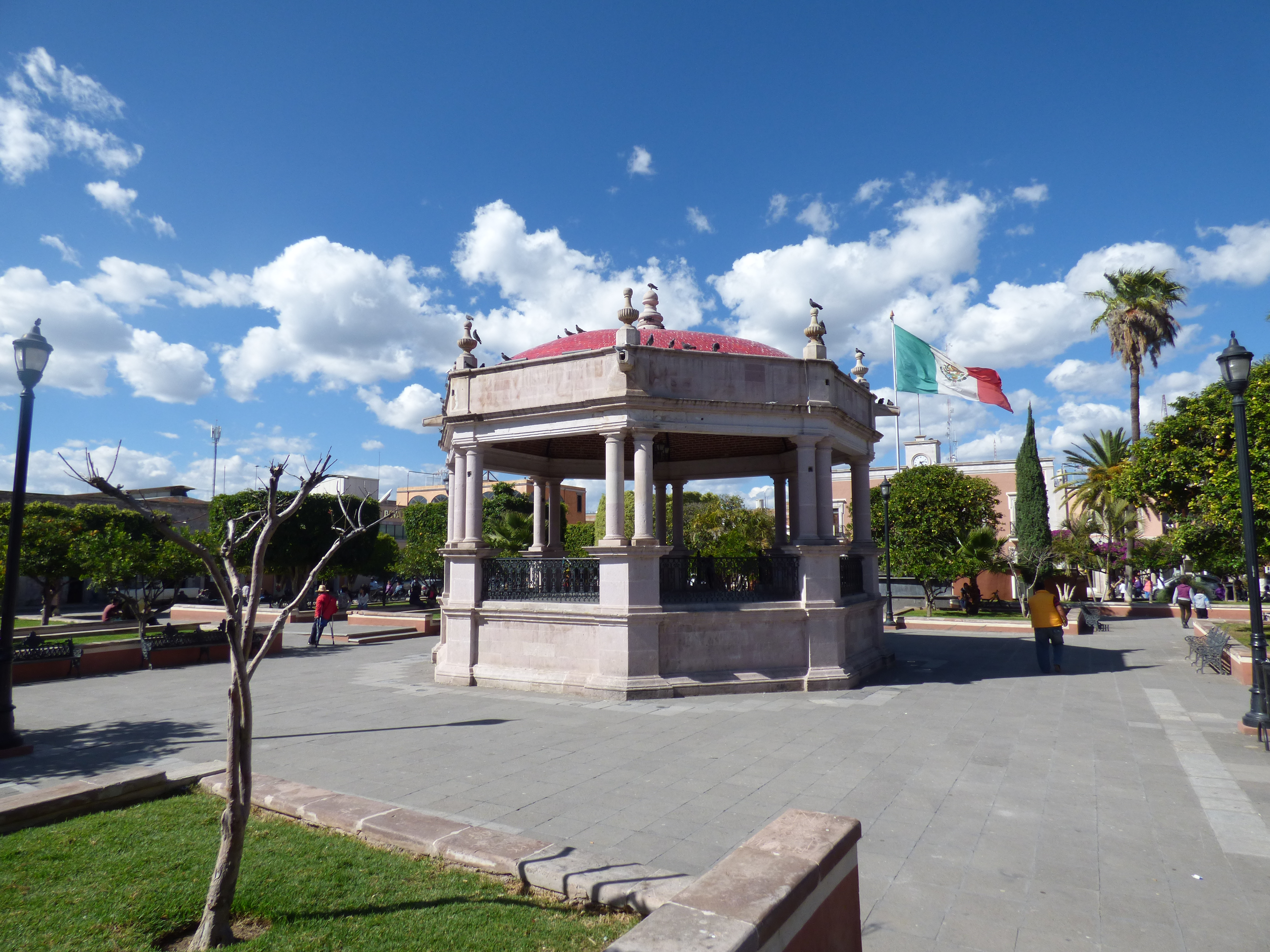
- Plaza Principal Porfirio Díaz in Calvillo

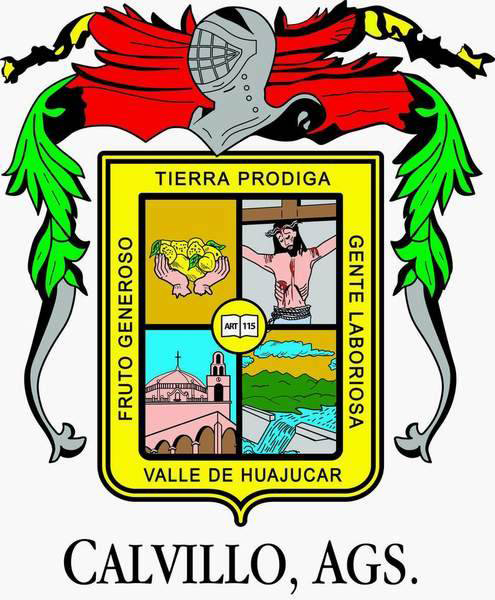
- Coat of arms

- Location in Mexico Calvillo, Aguascalientes (Mexico)
- Coordinates: 21°51′N 102°43′W
- Country: Mexico
- State: Aguascalientes
- Municipality: Calvillo

Government
  - Type: Ayuntamiento
  - Mayor: Daniel Romo Urrutia (PAN)
  - Federal electoral district: Aguascalientes's 1st

Area
  - Total: 359.56 sq mi (931.26 km^{2})

Population (2020)
  - Total: 58,250
  - Density: 162.0/sq mi (62.55/km^{2})
- Time zone: UTC−6 (Central)
- Website: https://www.calvillo.gob.mx

Calvillo (Spanish: [kalˈβiʝo]) is a city in the Mexican state of Aguascalientes. The town serves as the municipal seat of the surrounding municipality of Calvillo. Calvillo is the second most populated city in the state, surpassed in importance only by the capital city. It is located about 52 kilometers from the city of Aguascalientes. It stands at 21°51′N 102°43′W in the southwestern corner of the state.

== History ==
During the French invasion of Mexico, the north part of the valley of Huajuacar in which Calvillo lays, was occupied by the French. At the time, they intermixed with the descendants of Spaniards which already inhabited the south part of the valley. This fact made Calvillo the municipality with most Caucasian-origin inhabitants in the state, compared with the other municipalities.

Calvillo is the largest guava producer in Mexico and famous for its confectionery and liqueurs made from this fruit, which you can sample at the Guava Fair held during the first week of December.

The economy in Calvillo is centered on the guava, although there is other agriculture and a great deal of commerce. Calvillo is better known as the world capital of the guava.

== Demographics ==
As of 2010, Calvillo had a total population of 19,742.

== Tourism ==
Calvillo has a number of attractions of interest to tourists. One of them is the Main Square, which dates from 1778 and is famous for its orange trees. Calvillo is also home to the Temple of Our Lord of the Salitre; built in 1772, its interior features paintings that are considered jewels of religious art. The attractive dome topping the church has an exceptional size and diameter. Its rarest feature is that it is made as a single architectural piece; there are only five domes of this style worldwide. The interior of the dome features exquisite frescoes depicting the life of St. Joseph, the patron saint of the city. The Guadalupe Temple is another important church featuring majestic towers.

Another interesting place is the Malpaso Dam. The outskirts of Calvillo are a magnet for tourists. The Sierra del Laurel, south of the town, is a prolongation of Sierra Fría and highly sought after by rock climbers because of its steep sides. Also nearby are the La Cordorniz Dam, and the ex-convent of the Tepozán, where, at the bottom of the gully, there is a rocky area with cave paintings. The prehistoric paintings of El Tepozan show diverse figures in different colors imprinted in various eras. Very close to these two attractions, in the town of La Panadera and chikis it is still practiced the old craft of embroidery and unthreading or "deshilados", the state's craft by excellence.

Calvillo is a major center of guava production and export in Mexico. The municipality also produces guava-based confectionery and liqueurs. These products are featured at the annual Guava Fair, held in early December.

The economy in Calvillo is centered on the guava, although there is other agriculture and a great deal of commerce. Calvillo is better known as the world capital of the guava. Calvillo has also been hit by floods in 1991 and 2008 causing damage (Estimated cost combined by inflation is 67 million.) People from Calvillo are called "calvillenses".

== Geography ==
=== Climate ===
Climate data for Calvillo (1991–2020)
Month	Jan	Feb	Mar	Apr	May	Jun	Jul	Aug	Sep	Oct	Nov	Dec	Year
Record high °C (°F)	32.0 (89.6)	35.5 (95.9)	37.0 (98.6)	40.0 (104.0)	40.0 (104.0)	40.0 (104.0)	36.5 (97.7)	35.0 (95.0)	34.0 (93.2)	37.0 (98.6)	39.0 (102.2)	32.0 (89.6)	40.0 (104.0)
Mean daily maximum °C (°F)	23.2 (73.8)	25.3 (77.5)	28.5 (83.3)	30.3 (86.5)	32.9 (91.2)	31.1 (88.0)	27.8 (82.0)	27.6 (81.7)	27.1 (80.8)	27.6 (81.7)	26.0 (78.8)	23.9 (75.0)	27.6 (81.7)
Daily mean °C (°F)	12.7 (54.9)	14.2 (57.6)	16.5 (61.7)	18.7 (65.7)	21.8 (71.2)	22.4 (72.3)	20.5 (68.9)	20.3 (68.5)	19.9 (67.8)	18.5 (65.3)	15.5 (59.9)	13.2 (55.8)	17.9 (64.2)
Mean daily minimum °C (°F)	2.2 (36.0)	3.0 (37.4)	4.6 (40.3)	7.1 (44.8)	10.7 (51.3)	13.7 (56.7)	13.2 (55.8)	13.0 (55.4)	12.6 (54.7)	9.3 (48.7)	5.0 (41.0)	2.6 (36.7)	8.1 (46.6)
Record low °C (°F)	−6.5 (20.3)	−5.5 (22.1)	−5.0 (23.0)	1.0 (33.8)	2.5 (36.5)	6.5 (43.7)	6.5 (43.7)	7.5 (45.5)	5.0 (41.0)	0.5 (32.9)	−4.0 (24.8)	−7.5 (18.5)	−7.5 (18.5)
Average precipitation mm (inches)	19.2 (0.76)	12.8 (0.50)	5.4 (0.21)	4.4 (0.17)	17.4 (0.69)	97.2 (3.83)	153.4 (6.04)	137.5 (5.41)	99.1 (3.90)	33.6 (1.32)	10.7 (0.42)	10.6 (0.42)	601.3 (23.67)
Average precipitation days (≥ 0.1 mm)	2.3	1.9	1.2	1.1	4.1	11.2	16.4	14.4	11.7	5.0	2.1	1.6	73.0
Source: Servicio Meteorologico Nacional

== Notes ==
- Link to tables of population data from Census of 2005 INEGI: Instituto Nacional de Estadística, Geografía e Informática
- Aguascalientes Enciclopedia de los Municipios de México
- www.myspace.com/calvisranch for a Spanish version of the history of Calvillo
