= XHERO-FM =

Radio station in Aguascalientes, Aguascalientes, Mexico

- Aguascalientes, Aguascalientes; Mexico
- Frequency: 98.9 MHz
- Branding: La Invasora

Programming
- Format: Regional Mexican

Ownership
- Owner: Radiogrupo; (Radio Central, S.A. de C.V.)

History
- First air date: November 3, 1964
- Former frequencies: 1240 AM; 1260 AM; 1490 AM

Technical information
- Licensing authority: CRT
- Class: B1
- ERP: 25 kW
- HAAT: 68.91 meters (226.1 ft)
- Transmitter coordinates: 21°53′04″N 102°19′56″W

Links
- Webcast: Listen live
- Website: radiogrupo.com

XHERO-FM is a radio station in Aguascalientes, Aguascalientes. Broadcasting on 98.9 FM, XHERO is owned by Radiogrupo and carries a Regional Mexican format known as La Invasora.

== History ==
XERO-AM received its concession on November 3, 1964, originally broadcasting on 1490 AM. Sometime in the 1990s, XERO was moved to 1260, and then in February 2003, as part of a power increase to 10 kW day/2.5 kW night, XERO was moved one final time to 1240.

XERO migrated to FM in the early 2010s as XHERO-FM 98.9.
