= XHYZ-FM =

Radio station in Aguascalientes, Aguascalientes

- Aguascalientes, Aguascalientes; Mexico
- Frequency: 107.7 FM (HD Radio)
- Branding: La Poderosa

Programming
- Format: Regional Mexican

Ownership
- Owner: Radiogrupo; (Radio Central, S.A. de C.V.)

History
- First air date: January 2, 1950 (concession)
- Former call signs: XEYZ-AM (1950–2018)

Technical information
- Licensing authority: CRT
- Class: B1
- ERP: 25,000 watts
- HAAT: 189.9 meters (623 ft)
- Transmitter coordinates: 21°55′08″N 102°15′44″W

Links
- Website: radiogrupo.com/lapoderosa107-7/

XHYZ-FM is a radio station in Aguascalientes, Aguascalientes. Broadcasting on 107.7 MHz, it is owned by Radiogrupo and carries a Regional Mexican format known as La Poderosa.

== History ==
XEYZ-AM received its concession on January 2, 1950. It was owned by Radiodifusión del Centro, S.A., and broadcast on 1450 kHz, with 100 watts. In 1985, XEYZ slid down the dial to 1260 kHz.

Radio y Publicidad de Aguascalientes purchased XEYZ in 1993. It converted the station to an AM-FM combo the next year. In the early 2000s, XEYZ was moved to 1130 kHz, allowing a power increase to 10,000 watts.

It was approved to migrate to FM in 2010.

On May 9, 2018, the AM frequency was surrendered.
