= XHUZ-FM =

Radio station in Aguascalientes, Aguascalientes

- Aguascalientes, Aguascalientes; Mexico
- Broadcast area: Aguascalientes
- Frequency: 105.3 MHz (HD Radio)
- Branding: 105 Digital

Programming
- Format: Contemporary hit radio

Ownership
- Owner: Radiogrupo; (Radio Central, S.A. de C.V.)

History
- First air date: April 11, 1980 (concession)

Technical information
- Licensing authority: CRT
- Class: C1
- ERP: 50 kW
- HAAT: 189.9 meters (623 ft)
- Transmitter coordinates: 21°55′08″N 102°15′44″W

Links
- Webcast: Listen live
- Website: www.radiogrupo.com/Poderosa/xhuz.html

XHUZ-FM is a radio station in Aguascalientes, Aguascalientes. Owned by Radiogrupo, it broadcasts on 105.3 FM and carries a CHR format under the name "105 Digital".

XHUZ was authorized for HD Radio in 2015 and was the first station in the state to receive such authorization.
