= Snyder, Texas =

- City
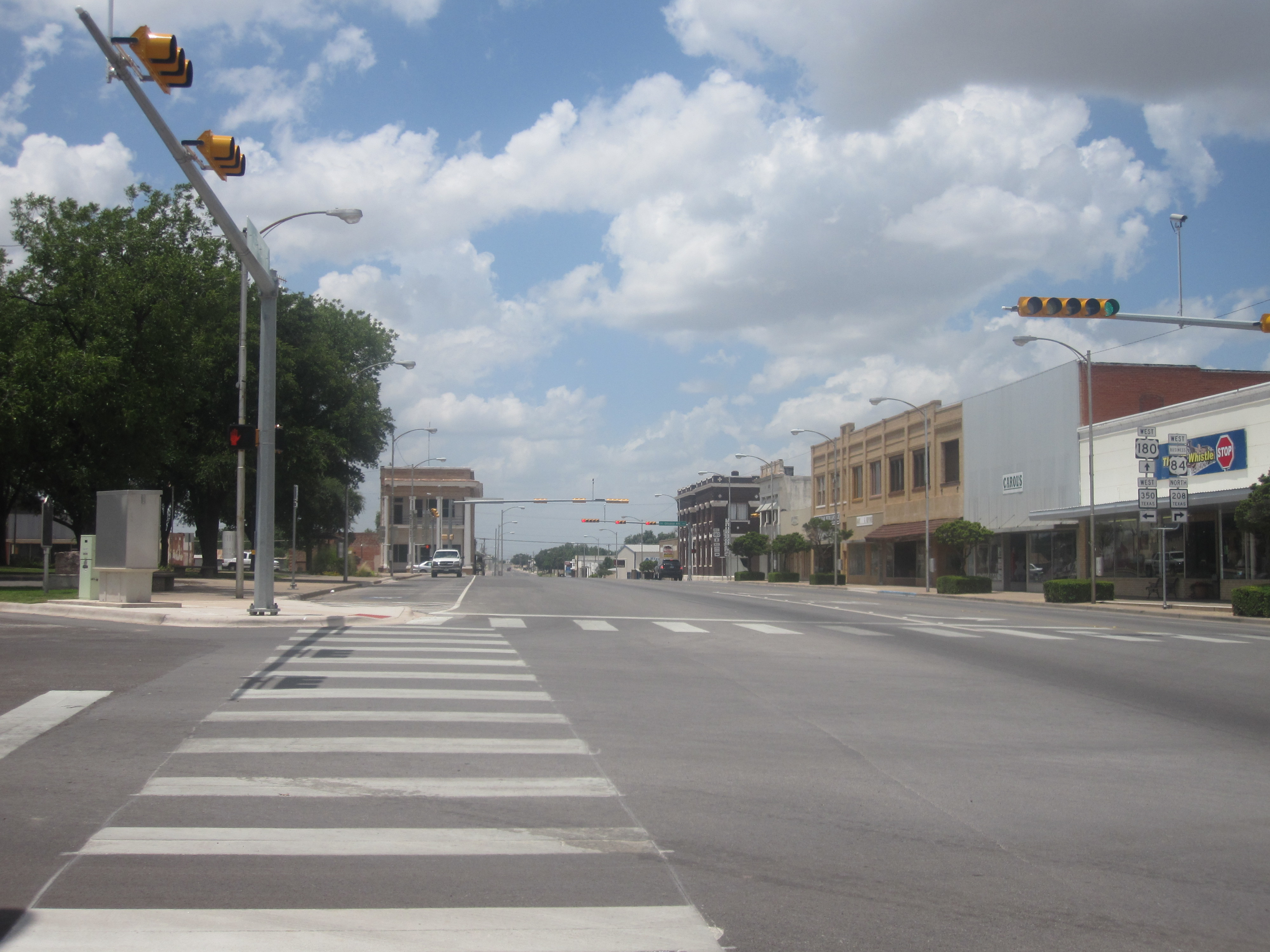
- Downtown Snyder

- Location of Snyder, Texas
- Coordinates: 32°42′56″N 100°54′52″W
- Country: United States
- State: Texas
- County: Scurry

Area
  - Total: 8.97 sq mi (23.23 km^{2})
  - Land: 8.94 sq mi (23.15 km^{2})
  - Water: 0.031 sq mi (0.08 km^{2})
- Elevation: 2,320 ft (707 m)

Population (2020)
  - Total: 11,438
  - Estimate (2022): 11,230
  - Density: 1,280/sq mi (494.1/km^{2})
- Time zone: UTC−6 (Central (CST))
  - Summer (DST): UTC−5 (CDT)
- ZIP codes: 79549-79550
- Area code: 325
- FIPS code: 48-68624
- GNIS feature ID: 1347340
- Website: https://www.snydertx.gov/

Snyder is a city in and the county seat of Scurry County, Texas, United States. Its population was 11,438 at the 2020 census. The city is located in the lower part of the Southwestern Tablelands ecological region.

== History ==
Snyder is named for merchant and buffalo hunter William Henry (Pete) Snyder, who built a trading post on Deep Creek in 1878. It soon drew fellow hunters, and a small settlement grew up around the post. The nature of those early dwellings, mostly constructed of buffalo hide and tree branches, led to the community's first, if unofficial, name of "Hide Town". Another early name, "Robber's Roost", is said to owe its beginnings to the sometimes nefarious nature of a few residents and a lack of law enforcement. A statue of an albino buffalo on the grounds of the Scurry County Courthouse in Snyder pays homage to the town's beginnings as a buffalo-trading post.

Snyder antedates Scurry County by two years, with a town plan being drawn up in 1882, while the county was not organized until 1884. A population of 600 was reported in 1892, with a school, two churches, a grist mill, steam gin, two banks, and two weekly newspapers being part of the community. Significant change happened in 1907, when Snyder was granted a city charter, and construction began on the Roscoe, Snyder and Pacific Railway. The 1910 census indicated Snyder had grown to a population of 2,514. The Atchison, Topeka & Santa Fe Railway tracks reached Snyder in 1911, spurring further growth. Ranching and farming were the primary economic backbone of Snyder through the first half of the 20th century.

This changed in 1948, when oil was discovered in the Canyon Reef area north of town. Snyder became a boomtown, as the population jumped to about 12,000 in just a year's time. By the time the boom ended in 1951, an estimated peak population of 16,000 had been reached. This soon decreased to the 10,000 to 11,000 level and stabilized. Although the boom was over, oil still remained a vital part of the local economy, with the Snyder area being one of the leading oil-producing areas in Texas. In 1973, the one-billionth barrel of oil was pumped from the nearby oil fields.

An industrial base was established in the 1960s and early 1970s, diversifying the town's economy and making it less susceptible to cycles of boom and bust. Higher education came to Snyder in 1971 with the founding of Western Texas College.

The Scurry County Coliseum in Snyder, operated by Western Texas College since 2008, is a large arena that hosts area events. Outside the coliseum is a locomotive engine and a small restored historic village. Also located in Snyder is the Diamond M Museum. Established by local oilman and rancher Clarence T. McLaughlin, the museum houses over 80 bronze works and 200 paintings. Among the collection are works by Peter Hurd and Andrew Wyeth.

== Geography ==
Snyder is located on Deep Creek, a minor tributary of the Colorado River of Texas.

Snyder is about 90 miles (140 km) southeast of Lubbock, 80 miles (130 km) northwest of Abilene, 90 miles (140 km) northeast of Midland, and 100 miles (160 km) north of San Angelo.

=== Climate ===
Climate data for Snyder, Texas (1991–2020 normals, extremes 1911–present)
Month	Jan	Feb	Mar	Apr	May	Jun	Jul	Aug	Sep	Oct	Nov	Dec	Year
Record high °F (°C)	86 (30)	92 (33)	99 (37)	104 (40)	110 (43)	114 (46)	114 (46)	115 (46)	108 (42)	102 (39)	91 (33)	87 (31)	115 (46)
Mean maximum °F (°C)	77.2 (25.1)	81.3 (27.4)	88.1 (31.2)	93.6 (34.2)	99.7 (37.6)	101.8 (38.8)	102.7 (39.3)	101.6 (38.7)	97.7 (36.5)	92.5 (33.6)	82.9 (28.3)	76.7 (24.8)	105.0 (40.6)
Mean daily maximum °F (°C)	57.0 (13.9)	61.5 (16.4)	69.7 (20.9)	78.3 (25.7)	85.7 (29.8)	92.4 (33.6)	95.6 (35.3)	94.4 (34.7)	87.0 (30.6)	78.0 (25.6)	66.0 (18.9)	57.7 (14.3)	76.9 (24.9)
Daily mean °F (°C)	43.0 (6.1)	46.8 (8.2)	55.0 (12.8)	63.2 (17.3)	72.1 (22.3)	79.7 (26.5)	82.9 (28.3)	82.0 (27.8)	74.5 (23.6)	64.4 (18.0)	52.2 (11.2)	44.1 (6.7)	63.3 (17.4)
Mean daily minimum °F (°C)	28.3 (−2.1)	31.9 (−0.1)	39.2 (4.0)	47.4 (8.6)	58.3 (14.6)	66.3 (19.1)	69.6 (20.9)	68.7 (20.4)	61.3 (16.3)	50.5 (10.3)	38.2 (3.4)	28.8 (−1.8)	49.0 (9.4)
Mean minimum °F (°C)	16.2 (−8.8)	19.3 (−7.1)	25.2 (−3.8)	34.0 (1.1)	44.9 (7.2)	58.9 (14.9)	64.7 (18.2)	63.2 (17.3)	49.0 (9.4)	35.5 (1.9)	23.9 (−4.5)	17.1 (−8.3)	12.4 (−10.9)
Record low °F (°C)	−10 (−23)	−11 (−24)	5 (−15)	20 (−7)	29 (−2)	40 (4)	52 (11)	46 (8)	35 (2)	19 (−7)	4 (−16)	−3 (−19)	−11 (−24)
Average precipitation inches (mm)	0.77 (20)	1.05 (27)	1.56 (40)	1.40 (36)	2.68 (68)	3.14 (80)	1.91 (49)	2.09 (53)	2.75 (70)	2.17 (55)	1.19 (30)	1.06 (27)	21.77 (553)
Average snowfall inches (cm)	0.1 (0.25)	0.5 (1.3)	0.0 (0.0)	0.0 (0.0)	0.0 (0.0)	0.0 (0.0)	0.0 (0.0)	0.0 (0.0)	0.0 (0.0)	0.0 (0.0)	0.4 (1.0)	0.8 (2.0)	1.8 (4.6)
Average precipitation days (≥ 0.01 in)	3.5	4.4	5.3	4.0	6.8	6.2	4.6	5.4	5.6	5.3	3.7	4.0	58.8
Average snowy days (≥ 0.1 in)	0.0	0.2	0.0	0.0	0.0	0.0	0.0	0.0	0.0	0.0	0.0	0.3	0.5
Source: NOAA

== Demographics ==
Historical population
Census	Pop.	Note	%±
1890	500		—
1910	2,514		—
1920	2,179		−13.3%
1930	3,008		38.0%
1940	3,815		26.8%
1950	12,010		214.8%
1960	13,850		15.3%
1970	11,171		−19.3%
1980	12,705		13.7%
1990	12,195		−4.0%
2000	10,783		−11.6%
2010	11,202		3.9%
2020	11,438		2.1%
2022 (est.)	11,230		−1.8%
U.S. Decennial Census

=== 2020 census ===
As of the 2020 census, Snyder had a population of 11,438 people and 2,843 families residing in the city. The median age was 34.1 years, 28.2% of residents were under 18, and 15.0% were 65 or older. For every 100 females, there were 97.3 males, and for every 100 females 18 and over, there were 94.9 males 18 and over.

About 98.5% of residents lived in urban areas, while 1.5% lived in rural areas.

Of the 4,120 households in Snyder, 37.6% had children under 18 living in them, 47.5% were married-couple households, 18.5% were households with a male householder and no spouse or partner present, and 27.7% were households with a female householder and no spouse or partner present. About 28.2% of all households were made up of individuals, and 12.8% had someone living alone who was 65 or older.

The 4,725 housing units were 12.8% vacant. The homeowner vacancy rate was 2.8% and the rental vacancy rate was 13.7%.

Racial composition as of the 2020 census
Race	Number	Percent
White	6,820	59.6%
Black or African American	409	3.6%
American Indian and Alaska Native	102	0.9%
Asian	75	0.7%
Native Hawaiian and other Pacific Islander	6	0.1%
Some other race	2,134	18.7%
Two or more races	1,892	16.5%
Hispanic or Latino (of any race)	5,645	49.4%

=== 2010 census ===
As of the census of 2010, 11,202 people, 4,128 households, and 2,880 families resided in the city. The population density was 1,256.8 people/sq mi (485.2/km^{2}). The 5,013 housing units averaged 584.3/sq mi (225.6/km^{2}). The racial makeup of the city was 79.00% White, 4.69% African American, 0.57% Native American, 0.25% Asian, 13.68% from other races, and 1.81% from two or more races. Hispanics or Latinos of any race were 31.8% of the population.

Of the 4,068 households, 34.9% had children under 18 living with them, 55.3% were married couples living together, 11.8% had a female householder with no husband present, and 29.2% were not families. About 26.5% of all households were made up of individuals, and 14.2% had someone living alone who was 65 or older. The average household size was 2.56, and the average family size was 3.10.

In the city, the age distribution was 27.8% under 18, 10.5% from 18 to 24, 24.0% from 25 to 44, 20.8% from 45 to 64, and 16.9% who were 65 or older. The median age was 36 years. For every 100 females, there were 87.3 males. For every 100 females age 18 and over, there were 83.9 males.

The median income in the city for a household was $42,077 and for a family was $55,567. Males had a median income of $30,033 versus $17,609 for females. The per capita income for the city was $23,296. About 13.7% of families and 17.0% of the population were below the poverty line, including 22.4% of those under 18 and 10.8% of those 65 or over.

== Economy ==
Snyder's economy is based on oil, gas, and wind industries. In 2012, 994 jobs were created in Snyder, leading to 20% job growth in the community, according to the Development Corporation of Snyder.

The nearby Scurry Area Canyon Reef Operators oilfield is among the largest and most productive in the United States. Snyder is also located within the footprint of the recently discovered Cline Shale. Two of the largest wind farms in the United States are located in Snyder area. Other industries in Snyder include manufacturing and cotton.

The Texas Department of Criminal Justice operates the Snyder Distribution Center.

== Education ==
The Snyder Independent School District serves Snyder. The schools are Snyder Primary, Snyder Intermediate, Snyder Junior High School, and Snyder High School. Snyder Academy and Snyder Christian School also serve the area.

Western Texas College, a two-year community college, is located in Snyder. In addition to traditional academic courses, Western Texas College offers several career/technical programs, including communication design, early childhood education, electrical distribution systems, information technology, business management, petroleum technology, radio broadcasting, solar energy technology, turfgrass and landscape management, vocational nursing, and welding. The Texas Legislature designated the county as being in the Western Texas College District.

== Notable people ==
- Kevin Alejandro (born 1976), who starred in Ugly Betty on ABC as Santos and Southland on TNT as Detective Nate Moretta, a recurring cast member of the HBO series True Blood, and stars in CBS series Golden Boy, grew up in Snyder.
- Powers Boothe (1948–2017), Emmy-Award-winning actor who portrayed the demonic clergyman Jim Jones in Guyana Tragedy: The Story of Jim Jones, Curly Bill in Tombstone, Joshua Foss in Sudden Death, and Senator Roark in Sin City, is a native of Snyder
- Sonny Cumbie (born 1981), head football coach, Louisiana Tech University is a Snyder native. In 2004, as the starting quarterback for Texas Tech University, he led the nation in passing and total offense.
- Charlene Holt, actress and model, who starred in Western film El Dorado (1966 film) as Maudie, the love interest of Robert Mitchum and John Wayne, was born in Snyder.
- Dick Jones (1927–2014), actor, who starred in Buffalo Bill, Jr. in syndication in 1955 as "Dickie" Jones, and was voice of title character in 1940 Disney film Pinocchio, is a native of Snyder
- Charley Lockhart, born and raised in Snyder, was a politician - treasurer of Texas from 1931 to 1941, who received national media attention as a dwarf. He was known as "the smallest elected official in the biggest state".
- Brad Maule (born 1951), actor, best known for his longtime role as Dr. Tony Jones on the television daytime drama General Hospital, which he played until February 2006, was born in Rotan, Texas, but graduated from Snyder High School; he was a student of Jerry P. Worsham, who was theatre arts educator for several of Snyder's notable actors and actresses
- Dave McGinnis, football coach, head coach of NFL's Arizona Cardinals from 2000–03, graduated in 1969 from Snyder High School.
- Barry Tubb, actor, was born in Snyder.
- Christian Wiman (born 1966), poet and professor, was raised in Snyder.

== Gallery ==
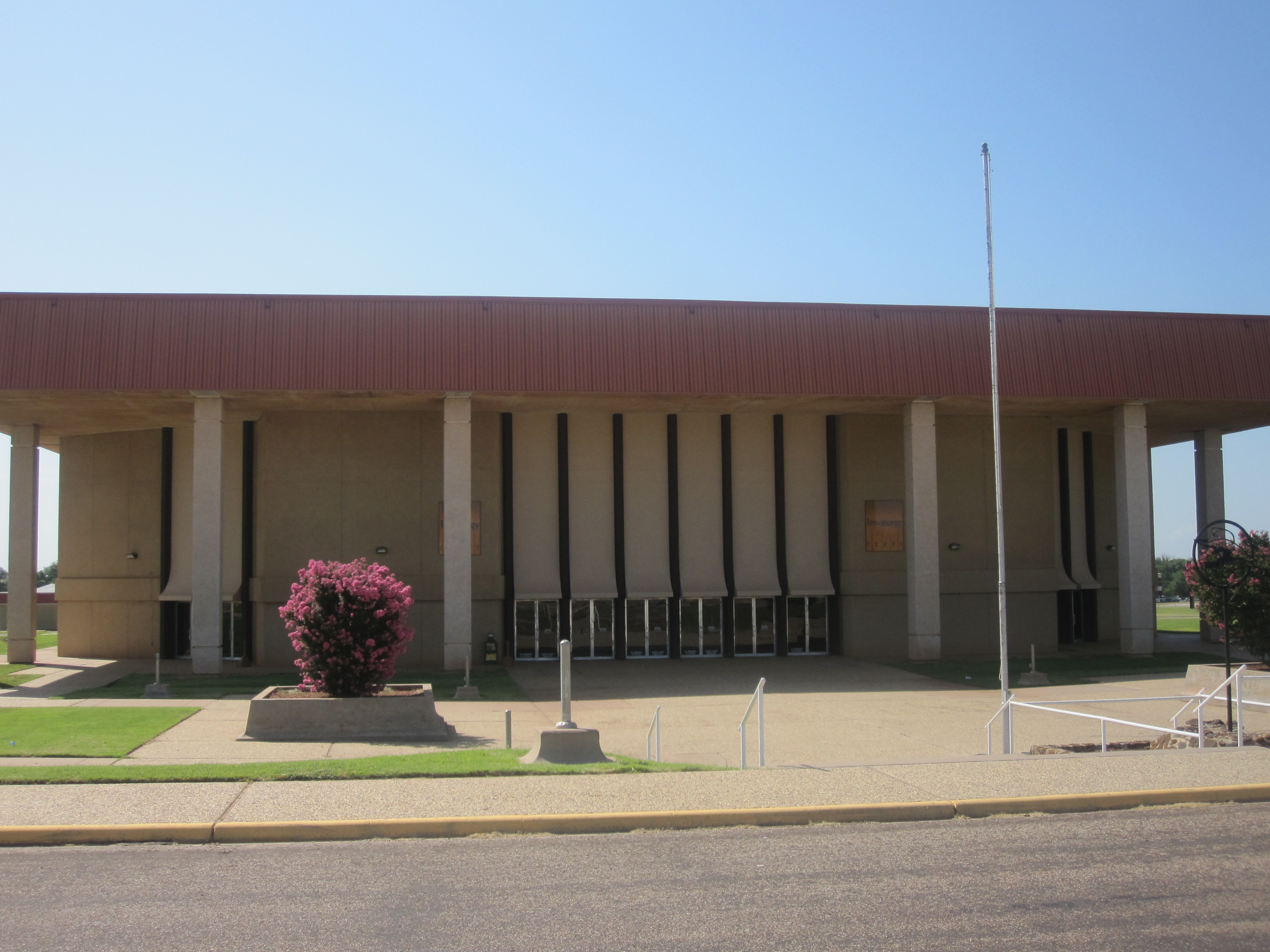
The Scurry County Coliseum in Snyder has been operated since 2008 by Western Texas College.

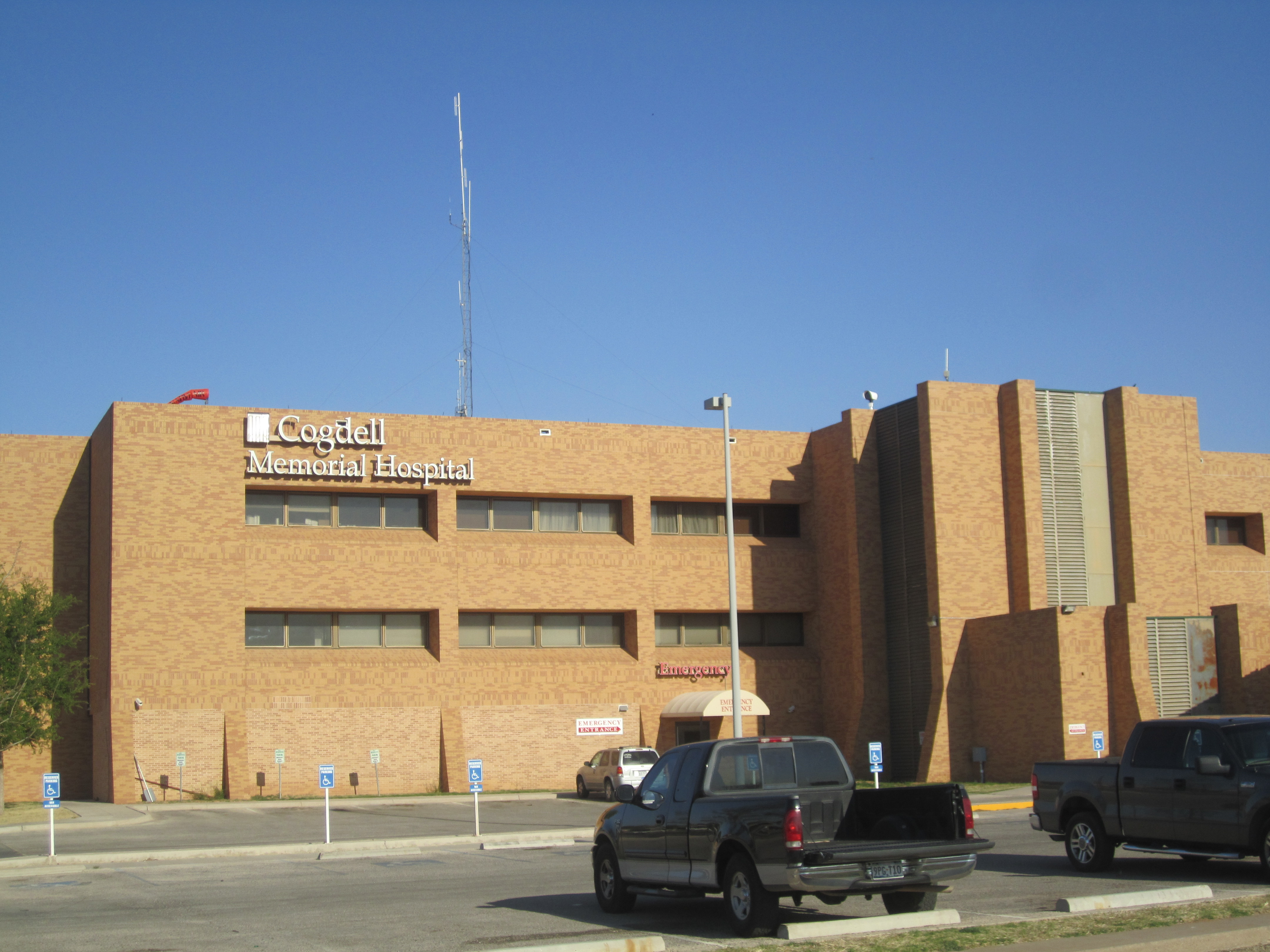
Cogdell Memorial Hospital is located near Western Texas College in Snyder.

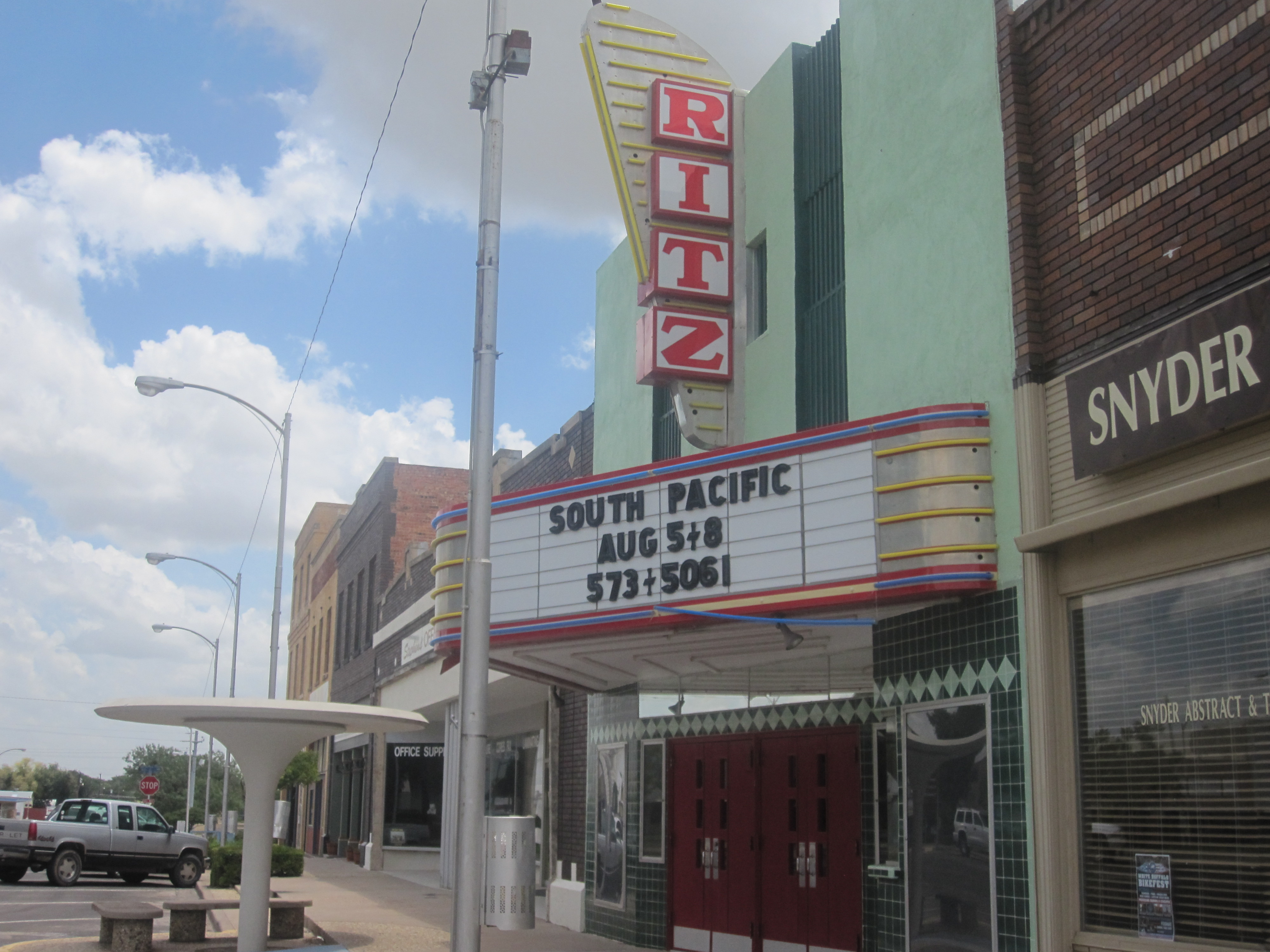
Ritz Theater in downtown Snyder

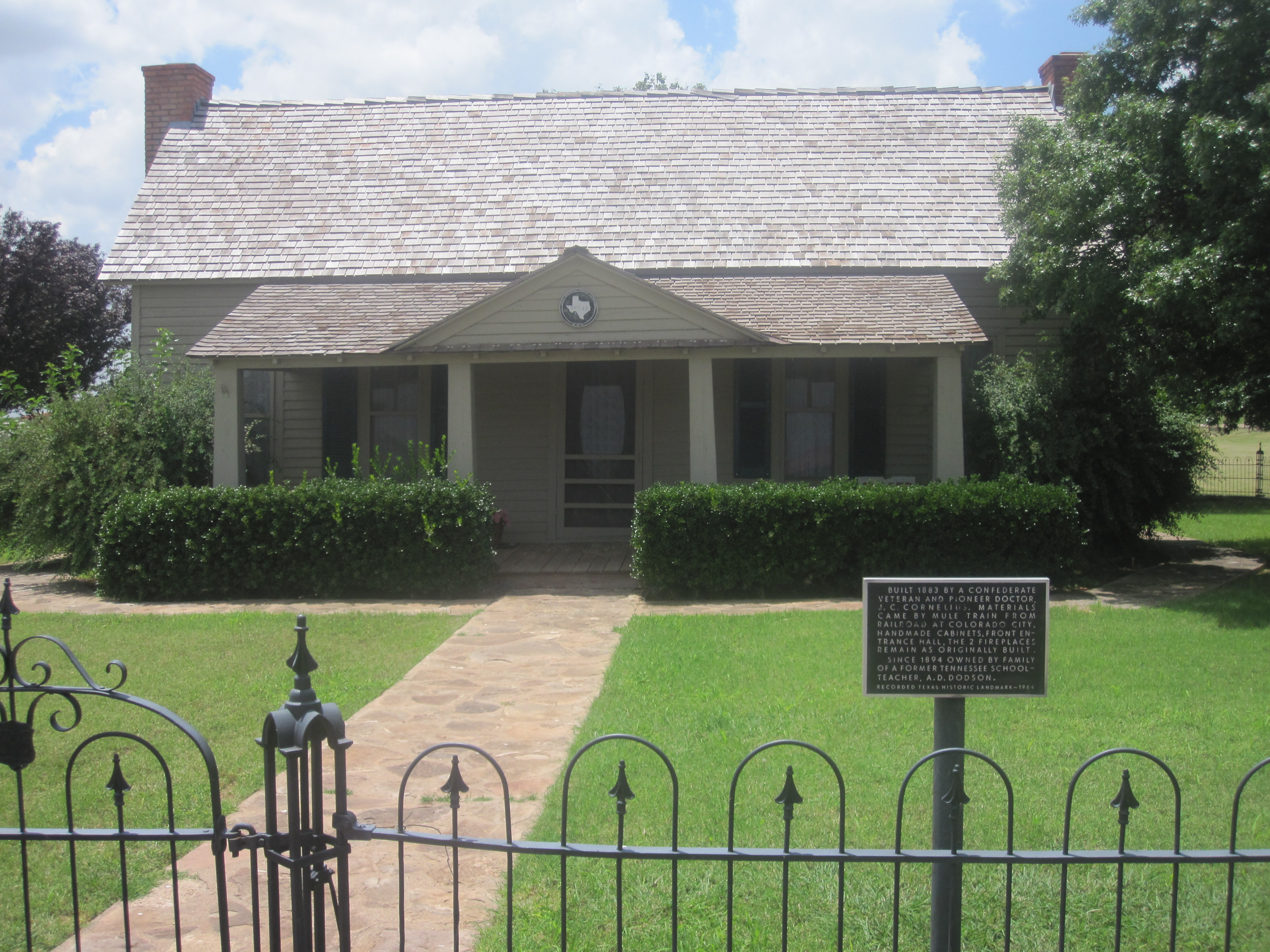
This 19th-century pioneer house was constructed by physician and Confederate veteran J.C. Cornelius. The restored home now serves as a museum.
