= 104.5 FM =

FM radio frequency

The following radio stations broadcast on FM frequency 104.5 MHz:

== Antarctica ==
- Ice FM at McMurdo, Ross Dependency

== Argentina ==
- Bahia Engaño in Rawson, Chubut
- LRM869 in Recreo, Santa Fe
- LRA305 in Rosario, Santa Fe
- Radio María in Isidro Casanova, Buenos Aires

== Australia ==
- Star 104.5 in Gosford
- 2PNN in Broken Hill
- Triple U FM in Nowra
- Triple M Brisbane
- Dusty Radio in Coober Pedy
- Eden FM Radio in Eden
- ABC Radio National in Alexandra
- SBS Radio in Launceston

== Belize ==
- Faith FM

== Canada (Channel 283) ==
- CBQN-FM in Osnaburgh, Ontario
- CBU-FM-8 in Whitehorse, Yukon
- CBYT-FM in Campbell River, British Columbia
- CFGT-FM in Alma, Quebec
- CFLG-FM in Cornwall, Ontario
- CHOU-FM-1 in Montreal, Quebec
- CFNT-FM in Tobique Indian Reserve, New Brunswick
- CFQK-FM in Kaministiquia, Ontario
- CHCR-FM-1 in Wilno, Ontario
- CHUM-FM in Toronto, Ontario
- CIAG-FM in Argentia, Newfoundland and Labrador
- CISP-FM in Pemberton, British Columbia
- CJCQ-FM-1 in Meadow Lake, Saskatchewan
- CJSB-FM in Swan River, Manitoba
- CJTS-FM in Sherbrooke, Quebec
- CJTT-FM in New Liskeard, Ontario
- CKAU-FM in Maliotenam, Quebec
- CKBZ-FM-1 in Pritchard, British Columbia
- CKJX-FM in Olds, Alberta
- CKQV-FM-2 in Kenora, Ontario
- CKQV-FM-3 in Sioux Lookout, Ontario
- CKMR-FM in Strathmore, Alberta
- CKTL-FM in Ste-Rose, Quebec
- CKUD-FM in Maple Creek, Saskatchewan
- VF2194 in Riley Creek, British Columbia
- VF2544 in Port Alberni, British Columbia
- VF7151 in Pierrefonds, Quebec

== China ==
- CNR China Rural Radio in Hohhot (in all times except 05:00-14:00)
- CNR Ethnic Minority Radio in Hohhot (during 05:00-14:00, using Mongolian)

== Greece ==
- 104.5 Crete Island, Greece in Crete

== Israel ==
- Radio Tzafon in Galilee and the Golan Heights

== Jamaica ==
- BBC World Service

== Malaysia ==
- Era in Johor Bahru, Johor and Singapore
- Hot FM in Ipoh, Kuala Kangsar, Central Perak, South Perak, Hilir Perak and Sabak Bernam, Selangor
- TraXX FM in Miri, Sarawak

== Mexico ==
- XHARO-FM in Ciudad Nezahualcóyotl, Estado de México
- XHCHA-FM in Chihuahua, Chihuahua
- XHCPBQ-FM in Bacerac, Sonora
- XHCU-FM in Cuautla, Morelos
- XHDC-FM in Aguascalientes, Aguascalientes
- XHDRD-FM in Durango, Durango
- XHEVC-FM in Fortín, Veracruz
- XHGMS-FM in Martínez de la Torre, Veracruz
- XHKE-FM in Navojoa, Sonora
- XHLTN-FM in Tijuana, Baja California
- XHMF-FM in Monterrey, Nuevo León
- XHMXS-FM in Sicuicho, Los Reyes, Michoacán
- XHNKA-FM in Felipe Carrillo Puerto, Quintana Roo
- XHRD-FM in Pachuca, Hidalgo
- XHTTT-FM in Colima, Colima
- XHVAL-FM in Valle de Bravo, Estado de México
- XHZN-FM in Celaya, Guanajuato

== Nigeria ==
- OSBC in Osogbo
- Atlantic in Uyo
- Empire in Akure

== Philippines ==
- DWGL in Bayombong, Nueva Viscaya

== Spain ==
- Radio Marca Lanzarote in Lanzarote, Spain

== South Africa ==
- UCT Radio in Cape Town

== United Kingdom ==
- BBC Radio Lancashire in Lancashire, Northern England
- BBC Radio Sussex in Eastbourne
- BBC Three Counties Radio in Milton Keynes
- CVFM in Middlesbrough, North Yorkshire, North East England
- BBC Radio Derby in Derbyshire and East Staffordshire
- Peoples FM in Leeds, West Riding of Yorkshire

== United States (Channel 283) ==
- KBEF in Gibsland, Louisiana
- KBMC-LP in Macks Creek, Missouri
- KBTW in Lenwood, California
- KBUN-FM in Blackduck, Minnesota
- KBYC in Markham, Texas
- KCBW in Grandin, Missouri
- KCCR-FM in Blunt, South Dakota
- KCEC in Wellton, Arizona
- KCVN in Cozad, Nebraska
- KDAT in Cedar Rapids, Iowa
- KDOT in Reno, Nevada
- KENJ-LP in Lowell, Arkansas
- KFXJ in Augusta, Kansas
- KGDH-LP in Mobile, Alabama
- KHDZ-LP in Porterville, California
- KHHS in Pearcy, Arkansas
- KHPD-LP in Hurricane, Utah
- KJLY in Blue Earth, Minnesota
- KJTX in Jefferson, Texas
- KJYR in Newport, Washington
- KKDA in Dallas, Texas
- KKFG in Bloomfield, New Mexico
- KKMY in Orange, Texas
- KKVU in Stevensville, Montana
- KLSW in Covington, Washington
- KMGC in Camden, Arkansas
- KMIH in Mercer Island, Washington
- KMYZ in Pryor, Oklahoma
- KNBR-FM in San Francisco, California
- KNGS-LP in Hanford, California
- KPLP in White Salmon, Washington
- KPTJ In Grape Creek, Texas
- KPUS in Gregory, Texas
- KRVQ-FM in Lake Isabella, California
- KSLQ in Washington, Missouri
- KSRZ in Omaha, Nebraska
- KSTT-FM in Atascadero, California
- KSTY in Canon City, Colorado
- KTRN in White Hall, Arkansas
- KUMR in Doolittle, Missouri
- KVIW-LP in Deming, New Mexico
- KWBB in Upton, Wyoming
- KWMZ-FM in Empire, Louisiana
- KWPV in Wynnewood, Oklahoma
- KYAP in Centennial, Wyoming
- KYTP-LP in Galt, California
- KZCW-LP in Conroe, Texas
- KZEP in San Antonio, Texas
- KZJJ in Mesa, Washington
- KZUL in Lake Havasu City, Arizona
- KZXQ in Reserve, New Mexico
- KZZW in Mooreland, Oklahoma
- WASP-LP in Huntington, West Virginia
- WAXX in Eau Claire, Wisconsin
- WBVN in Carrier Mills, Illinois
- WCCG in Hope Mills, North Carolina
- WFMB-FM in Springfield, Illinois
- WGFX in Gallatin, Tennessee
- WGRX in Falmouth, Virginia
- WHAJ in Bluefield, West Virginia
- WHLC in Highlands, North Carolina
- WHNB in Hancock, New York
- WIFL-LP in Weirsdale, Florida
- WILZ in Saginaw, Michigan
- WJJK in Noblesville, Indiana
- WKAK in Albany, Georgia
- WKHJ in Mountain Lake Park, Maryland
- WKHT in Knoxville, Tennessee
- WKPJ-LP in Athens, Tennessee
- WLKT in Lexington-Fayette, Kentucky
- WLXD in State College, Mississippi
- WLZZ in Montpelier, Ohio
- WNBT-FM in Wellsboro, Pennsylvania
- WNVZ in Norfolk, Virginia
- WNXX in Jackson, Louisiana
- WOKV-FM in Atlantic Beach, Florida
- WQKT in Wooster, Ohio
- WRFF in Philadelphia, Pennsylvania
- WRFQ (FM) in Mount Pleasant, South Carolina
- WRFU-LP in Urbana, Illinois
- WRVR in Memphis, Tennessee
- WSLD in Whitewater, Wisconsin
- WSNX in Muskegon, Michigan
- WSTK in Aurora, North Carolina
- WTMM in Mechanicville, New York
- WVMJ in Conway, New Hampshire
- WWDN in Danville, Virginia
- WWOH-LP in Marietta, Ohio
- WXER in Plymouth, Wisconsin
- WXLO in Fitchburg, Massachusetts
- WXMJ in Cambridge Springs, Pennsylvania
- WXRR in Hattiesburg, Mississippi
- WXYR-LP in Monticello, Kentucky
- WYCJ-LP in Simpsonville, South Carolina
- WYHW in Wilmington, North Carolina
- WYWH-LP in Athens, Ohio
- WYYU in Dalton, Georgia
- WZFR in Eastpoint, Florida
- WZTC in Traverse City, Michigan
