= List of radio stations in the State of Mexico =

This is a list of CRT-licensed radio stations in the State of Mexico, Mexico, which can be sorted by their call signs, frequencies, location, ownership, names, and programming formats.

Radio stations in the State of Mexico
Call sign	Frequency	Location	Owner	Name	Format
XENK-AM	620 AM	San Andrés de La Cañada	Radio M73 XENK, S. de R.L. de C.V.	ESNE Radio, La Guadalupana	Catholic
XETUL-AM	1080 AM	Tultitlán	Gobierno del Estado de México	Mexiquense Radio	Public radio
XECHAP-AM	1130 AM	Texcoco	Universidad Autónoma Chapingo	Radio Chapingo	University radio
XETEJ-AM	1250 AM	Tejupilco de Hidalgo	Gobierno del Estado de México	Mexiquense Radio	Public radio
XEGEM-AM	1600 AM	Metepec	Gobierno del Estado de México	Mexiquense Radio	Public radio
XEANAH-AM	1670 AM	Huixquilucan	Productora y Difusora Universitaria, A.C.	Radio Anáhuac	University
XHTEJ-FM	88.3 FM	Tejupilco de Hidalgo	Roberto Rodríguez Gómez	Radio Roca	
XHZUM-FM	88.5 FM	Zumpango de Ocampo	Gobierno del Estado de México	Mexiquense Radio	Public radio
XHOEX-FM	89.3 FM	Texcoco	Omega Experimental, A.C.	La Uni-K	Community radio
XHCH-FM	89.3 FM	Toluca	Radiodifusoras Capital, S.A. de C.V.	Lokura FM Rock	English classic hits
XHENO-FM	90.1 FM	Santa María Ocotitlán	Radio XHENO, S. de R.L. de C.V.	90.1 Mix	English adult contemporary
XHPAMM-FM	91.3 FM	Amatepec	José Félix Gallegos Hernández	La Inigualable	Regional Mexican
XHMEC-FM	91.7 FM	Amecameca	Gobierno del Estado de México	Mexiquense Radio	Public radio
XHGEM-FM	91.7 FM	Toluca	Gobierno del Estado de México	Mexiquense Radio	Public radio
XHRJ-FM	92.5 FM	Toluca (Metepec)	Corporación Radiofónica de Toluca, S. de R.L. de C.V.	Amor	Romantic
XHEDT-FM	93.3 FM	Toluca	Grupo Radial Siete, S.A. de C.V.	Crystal	Regional Mexican
XHEVAB-FM	93.5 FM	Valle de Bravo	Miled FM, S.A. de C.V.	Súper Stereo Miled	News/talk, Spanish oldies
XHSCEH-FM	95.5 FM	Capulhuac, Santiago Tianguistenco, etc.	Xtrema Capulhuac, A.C.	Xtrema Radio	Community radio
XHATF-FM	95.7 FM	Atlacomulco de Fabela	Fundación Educacional de Medios, A.C.	Cadena Azul Radio	Variety
XHLUV-FM	96.5 FM	Luvianos	La Calentana Luvimex, A.C.	La Calentana Mexiquense	Community radio
XHSCKH-FM	96.7 FM	San Antonio La Isla	Cultura y Comunicación Esperanza de Vida, A.C.	La Guapachoza	Community radio
XHECA-FM	97.3 FM	Amecameca	La Voladora Comunicación, A.C.	La Voladora Radio	Community radio
XHNEZ-FM	97.3 FM	Ciudad Nezahualcóyotl	Voces Urbanas, Movimiento Alternativo de Información Social, A.C.	En Neza Radio	Community radio
XHMTLA-FM	98.3 FM	Tlatlaya	Ayuntamiento del Municipio de Tlatlaya, México	La Ardiente	Public radio
XHCHAL-FM	98.9 FM	Chalco	Comunicaciones En Contacto, Cultura y Bienestar Social, A.C.	Contacto FM	Community radio
XHNX-FM	98.9 FM	Toluca	Miled FM, S.A. de C.V.	Súper Stereo Miled	News/talk, Spanish oldies
XHXI-FM	99.5 FM	Ixtapan de la Sal	Radiodifusoras Capital, S.A. de C.V.	Lokura FM Grupera	Regional Mexican
XHSCCG-FM	99.7 FM	Ciudad Nezahualcóyotl	Radial Humanamente Positiva, A.C.	RH Positiva	Community radio
XHUAX-FM	99.7 FM	Toluca	Universidad Autónoma del Estado de México	UniRadio	University radio
XHSCFE-FM	100.5 FM	Chalco de Díaz Covarrubias	Enlace de Expressiones Comunitarias FM, A.C.	Expressiones FM	Community radio
XHZA-FM	101.3 FM	Toluca	Ultradigital Toluca, S.A. de C.V.	Ultra	Contemporary hit radio
XHSCIW-FM (Note: Was XHVFC-FM)	102.1 FM	Otumba de Gómez Farías	Voz, Flor Y Canto, A.C.	Radio Evolución	Community radio
XHTOM-FM	102.1 FM	Toluca	XHTOM-FM, S.A. de C.V.	Radio Disney	Contemporary hit radio
XHTOL-FM	102.9 FM	Ixtlahuaca	Operadora del Valle Alto, S. de R.L. de C.V.	W Radio	News/talk
XHCME-FM	103.7 FM	Coacalco–Melchor Ocampo	Grupo Radial Siete, S.A. de C.V.	Crystal	Regional Mexican
XHQY-FM	103.7 FM	Toluca (Cacalomacán)	Radio Toluca, S.A. de C.V.	La Nueva Bestia	Regional Mexican
XHSCEK-FM	104.3 FM	Santiago Tianguistenco de Galeana	Comunicaciones y Cultura por un México Mejor, A.C.	Azul Radio	Community radio
XHARO-FM	104.5 FM	Ciudad Nezahualcóyotl	Radio Aro, A.C.	Radio Rélax	Community radio
XHVAL-FM	104.5 FM	Valle de Bravo	Gobierno del Estado de México	Mexiquense Radio	Public radio
XHRLK-FM	104.7 FM	Atlacomulco de Fabela	Miled FM, S.A. de C.V.	Súper Stereo Miled	News/talk, Spanish oldies
XHMLO-FM	104.9 FM	Malinalco	Grupo Radial Siete, S.A. de C.V.	Crystal	Regional Mexican
XHATL-FM	105.5 FM	Atlacomulco de Fabela	Gobierno del Estado de México	Mexiquense Radio	Public radio
XHSCBU-FM	106.7 FM	Xalatlaco	Sueños de Vida Xalatlaquense, A.C.	Traviesa 106.7	Community radio
XHSCCT-FM	106.9 FM	Jocotitlán	Radio Comunitaria Jocotitlán, A.C.	Radio Comunitaria Jocotitlán	Community radio
XHSCCJ-FM	107.5 FM	Tenancingo de Degollado	Radio Comunitaria Tenancingo, A.C.	Radio Comunitaria Tenancingo	Community radio
XHSCDV-FM	107.7 FM	Amatepec	La Auténtica Voz, A.C.		
