= List of radio stations in Colima =

Colima has 18 unique radio stations, with three of those also broadcasting on AM in addition to FM. All of the stations are concentrated in the Colima, Manzanillo, and Tecomán areas.

Radio stations in Colima
| Call sign | Frequency | Location | Owner | Name | Format |
|---|---|---|---|---|---|
| XECOEP-AM | 1020 AM | Colima City | Escápate al Paraíso, S.A. de C.V. | —N/a | —N/a |
| XEUU-AM (Note: Combo with XHUU-FM 92.5) | 1080 AM | Colima City | Radio Colima, S.A. | La Mejor | Regional Mexican |
| XETY-AM (Note: Combo with XHTY-FM 91.3) | 1390 AM | Tecomán | XETY-AM, S.A. de C.V. | Xplosión | Contemporary hit radio |
| XHCC-FM | 89.3 FM | Colima City | GIM Televisión Nacional, S.A. de C.V. | Imagen Radio | News/talk |
| XHECO-FM | 90.5 FM | Tecomán | XHECO-FM, S.A. de C.V. | La Bestia Grupera | Regional Mexican |
| XHTY-FM | 91.3 FM | Tecomán | XETY-AM, S.A. de C.V. | Xplosión | Contemporary hit radio |
| XHCIA-FM | 91.7 FM | Colima City | Colima Frecuencia Modulada, S.A. de C.V. | 91.7, Tu Playlist | Contemporary hit radio |
| XHANZ-FM | 92.1 FM | Manzanillo | Rate Cultural y Educativa de México, A.C. | Calor FM | Cultural |
| XHUU-FM | 92.5 FM | Colima City | Radio Colima, S.A. | La Mejor | Regional Mexican |
| XHMZO-FM | 92.9 FM | Manzanillo | La Onda del Mar, S.A. de C.V. | Radio Turquesa | Contemporary hit radio |
| XHEVE-FM | 93.3 FM | Colima City | XEVE, S.A. de C.V. | La Luperrona | Regional Mexican |
| XHZZZ-FM | 93.7 FM | Manzanillo | Radio Tesoro, S.A. de C.V. | La Bestia Grupera | Regional Mexican |
| XHUDC-FM | 94.9 FM | Colima City | University of Colima | Universo 94.9 | University |
| XHMAC-FM | 95.3 FM | Manzanillo | XEMAC-AM, S.A. de C.V. | La Poderosa | Regional Mexican |
| XHECS-FM | 96.1 FM | Manzanillo | Radio Manzanillo, S.A. de C.V. | La Mejor | Regional Mexican |
| XHAL-FM | 97.7 FM | Manzanillo | Silvia Evangelina Godoy Cárdenas | Radio Fórmula | News/talk |
| XHIRC-FM | 98.1 FM | Colima City | Government of the State of Colima | Conexión 98.1 FM | Public radio |
| XHERL-FM | 98.9 FM | Colima City | XERL, Sucesores de J. Roberto Levy, S.A. de C.V. | Súper 98.9 | Contemporary hit radio |
| XHCOC-FM | 99.7 FM | Colima City | Radio XHCOC, S. de R.L. de C.V. | Exa FM | Pop |
| XHIMA-FM | 100.5 FM | Colima City | Fundación Educacional de Medios, A.C. | Cadena Azul Radio | Variety |
| XHPARC-FM | 101.7 FM | Armería | Radiodifusora XHZER, S.A. de C.V. | Limón FM | Regional Mexican |
| XHOMA-FM | 102.1 FM | Comala | Gaia FM, A.C. | Recuerdo 102.1 | Oldies |
| XHSPRC-FM | 102.9 FM | Colima City | Sistema Público de Radiodifusión del Estado Mexicano | Altavoz Radio | Cultural, youth |
| XHCSAA-FM | 103.3 FM | Manzanillo | Fundación Educacional de Medios, A.C. | Cadena Azul Radio | Variety |
| XHTTT-FM | 104.5 FM | Colima City | Telecomunicaciones CH, S.A. de C.V. | Lokura FM | Adult hits |
| XHEMAX-FM | 105.3 FM | Tecomán | Radio Armería, S.A. de C.V. | Max 105.3 | Adult hits |
| XHSCAT-FM | 107.5 FM | Colima City–Villa de Álvarez | Organización de Radios Comunitarias de Occidente, A.C. | Radio Colima | Community radio |
