= 1440 AM =

AM radio frequency

The following radio stations broadcast on AM frequency 1440 kHz: 1440 AM is a regional broadcast frequency.

Because 1440 kHz is a multiple of both 9 and 10, the frequency is available for use by broadcast stations in all three ITU regions.

== Argentina ==
- LRI221 in Reconquista, Santa Fe.
- LV20 in Laboulaye, Cordoba.
- LU36 in Coronel Suarez, Buenos Aires.
- LRA53 in San Martin de los Andes, Neuquen.
- Impacto in La Matanza, Buenos Aires.

== Canada ==
- CKJR in Wetaskiwin, Alberta - 10 kW, transmitter located at 52.9583°N 113.451°W

== China ==
- CNR The Voice of China in Putian

== Denmark ==
- Radio 208 in Ishøj, Copenhagen - 500 W transmitter located at 55.6051626°N 12.3491335°E

== Japan ==
- JOWF in Sapporo

== Luxembourg ==
- RTL Radio. RTL also sells airtime to Radio China International and some religious broadcasters. This station closed on 31 December 2015.

== Mexico ==
- XEEST-AM in Mexico City

== South Korea ==
- AFN Korea in Pyeongtaek, Chilgok

== Taiwan ==
- Transfers CNR The Voice of China in Kinmen (and sometimes Matsu)

== United States ==
Call sign	City of license	Facility ID	Class	Daytime power (kW)	Nighttime power (kW)	Unlimited power (kW)	Transmitter coordinates
KAZG	Scottsdale, Arizona	11272	D	5	0.052		33.478611°N 111.94°W
KCHE	Cherokee, Iowa	60494	D	0.39	0.029		42.789167°N 95.552222°W
KELG	Manor, Texas	17807	B	0.8	0.5		30.326667°N 97.543056°W
KETX	Livingston, Texas	52895	D	5	0.091		30.739722°N 94.925°W
KEXB	University Park, Texas	34562	B	50	0.35		32.750556°N 96.722778°W
KEYS	Corpus Christi, Texas	39715	B	1	0.199		27.783889°N 97.458056°W
KFOO	Riverside, California	27390	B			1	34.026667°N 117.3575°W
KHLY	Hailey, Idaho	129638	D	0.27	0.107		43.549722°N 114.321389°W
KKMP	Garapan-Saipan, Northern Mariana Islands	161101	B	1.1	1.1		15.157778°N 145.718056°E
KKXL	Grand Forks, North Dakota	20324	B	0.6	0.3		47.964444°N 97.029444°W
KMAJ	Topeka, Kansas	42014	B	5	1		39.018611°N 95.572778°W
KODL	The Dalles, Oregon	36629	B	1	0.37		45.62°N 121.099722°W
KPUR	Amarillo, Texas	72037	B	5	1		35.122222°N 101.8025°W
KRDZ	Wray, Colorado	48395	D	5	0.212		40.082222°N 102.190278°W
KTUV	Little Rock, Arkansas	34988	B	5	0.24		34.712778°N 92.28°W
KUHL	Santa Maria, California	24952	B	5	1		34.983889°N 120.452778°W
KVON	Napa, California	74430	B	5	1		38.2625°N 122.282222°W
KYCR	Golden Valley, Minnesota	35504	B	5	0.5		44.988889°N 93.351667°W
WAJR	Morgantown, West Virginia	71671	B	5	0.5		39.676111°N 80.003333°W
WBLA	Elizabethtown, North Carolina	59467	D	5	0.197		34.625556°N 78.624444°W
WCDL	Carbondale, Pennsylvania	58316	D	5	0.037		41.556111°N 75.485833°W
WDXQ	Cochran, Georgia	26623	D	0.94	0.048		32.411944°N 83.361667°W
WEBR	Niagara Falls, New York	39517	D	1	0.055		43.078611°N 79.011111°W
WFNY	Gloversville, New York	129191	B	5	0.5		43.0325°N 74.350556°W
WGIG	Brunswick, Georgia	63432	B	5	1		31.168611°N 81.537222°W
WGVL	Greenville, South Carolina	59821	B	5	5		34.868333°N 82.467778°W
WHDM	McKenzie, Tennessee	61591	D	0.42	0.091		36.132778°N 88.523333°W
WHIS	Bluefield, West Virginia	502	B	5	0.5		37.275833°N 81.251667°W
WHKZ	Warren, Ohio	57235	B	5	5		41.164444°N 80.846389°W
WIBH	Anna, Illinois	68795	D	0.5	0.109		37.445833°N 89.25°W
WJBS	Holly Hill, South Carolina	19826	D	1			33.339722°N 80.438333°W
WKLV	Blackstone, Virginia	16584	D	5	0.072		37.053889°N 78.020833°W
WLCH	Manchester Township, Pennsylvania	55352	D	0.73	0.053		39.999444°N 76.745556°W
WLIM	Medford, New York	5208	D	1	0.028		40.795833°N 72.992222°W
WLXN	Lexington, North Carolina	15838	D	5.3	0.05		35.920278°N 80.250556°W (daytime); 35.832222°N 80.287222°W (nighttime)
WMAX	Bay City, Michigan	58576	B	5	2.5		43.524167°N 83.966111°W
WMKM	Inkster, Michigan	24966	B	1	1		42.256111°N 83.363333°W
WMVB	Millville, New Jersey	56183	D	0.46	0.046		39.421944°N 75.020556°W
WNFL	Green Bay, Wisconsin	9966	B	5	0.5		44.477778°N 88°W
WNPV	Lansdale, Pennsylvania	73347	D	0.25	0.023		40.238333°N 75.316667°W
WOCJ	Pontotoc, Mississippi	50286	D	1	0.066		34.252778°N 88.96°W
WPGW	Portland, Indiana	73877	D	0.5	0.045		40.436111°N 85.015556°W
WPRD	Winter Park, Florida	29341	B	5	1		28.588333°N 81.381389°W
WRED	Westbrook, Maine	3140	B	1	1		43.680556°N 70.379722°W
WRGM	Ontario, Ohio	25476	D	1	0.028		40.768056°N 82.617778°W
WROK	Rockford, Illinois	48987	B	5	0.27		42.279167°N 89.0375°W
WSGO	Oswego, New York	24130	D	1	0.045		43.415556°N 76.466667°W
WVEI	Worcester, Massachusetts	74466	B	5	5		42.289722°N 71.846667°W
WVGG	Lucedale, Mississippi	1060	D	5			30.932778°N 88.605833°W
WWCL	Lehigh Acres, Florida	50233	B	5	1		26.602222°N 81.559167°W
WYGH	Paris, Kentucky	25901	D	1	0.025		38.225°N 84.249722°W
WZYX	Cowan, Tennessee	67170	D	5	0.066		35.160833°N 86.030833°W
