= 1600 AM =

AM radio frequency

The following radio stations broadcast on AM frequency 1600 kHz: 1600 AM is classified as a regional frequency by the Federal Communications Commission.

== Argentina ==
- Armonia in Caseros
- EME in Montes de Oca, Santa Fe

== Mexico ==
- XEGEM-AM in Metepec, State of Mexico

== United States ==
| Call sign | City of license | Facility ID | Class | Daytime power (kW) | Nighttime power (kW) | Transmitter coordinates |
|---|---|---|---|---|---|---|
| KAHZ | Pomona, California | 61814 | B | 5 | 5 | 34.03°N 117.726389°W |
| KATZ | St. Louis, Missouri | 48968 | B | 6 | 3.5 | 38.617222°N 90.082778°W |
| KDAK | Carrington, North Dakota | 68632 | D | 0.5 | 0.09 | 47.428611°N 99.084167°W |
| KEPN | Lakewood, Colorado | 30823 | B | 5 | 5 | 39.655556°N 105.074444°W |
| KGYM | Cedar Rapids, Iowa | 9718 | B | 5 | 5 | 41.970833°N 91.533611°W |
| KIVA | Albuquerque, New Mexico | 65257 | D | 10 | 0.175 | 35.051111°N 106.642778°W |
| KLEB | Golden Meadow, Louisiana | 8381 | D | 0.72 | 0.06 | 29.395278°N 90.266944°W |
| KLGZ | Algona, Iowa | 35429 | B | 1 | 0.5 | 43.068056°N 94.304444°W |
| KMDO | Fort Scott, Kansas | 22097 | D | 0.77 | 0.035 | 37.783611°N 94.7°W |
| KNCY | Nebraska City, Nebraska | 63941 | D | 0.5 | 0.031 | 40.674167°N 95.885556°W |
| KNWA | Bellefonte, Arkansas | 26241 | D | 1 | 0.05 | 36.246944°N 93.085°W |
| KOHI | St. Helens, Oregon | 70467 | D | 1 | 0.012 | 45.854167°N 122.819722°W |
| KOKE | Pflugerville, Texas | 54661 | B | 5 | 0.7 | 30.345556°N 97.546111°W |
| KOPB | Eugene, Oregon | 841 | B | 5 | 1 | 44.051389°N 123.063333°W |
| KRFS | Superior, Nebraska | 64014 | D | 0.5 | 0.044 | 40.025°N 98.077222°W |
| KRVA | Cockrell Hill, Texas | 54730 | B | 25 | 0.93 | 32.739722°N 96.711389°W |
| KTAP | Santa Maria, California | 6142 | D | 0.47 | 0.026 | 34.98°N 120.453333°W |
| KTTN | Trenton, Missouri | 39167 | D | 0.5 | 0.033 | 40.083333°N 93.558333°W |
| KTUB | Centerville, Utah | 69557 | B | 5 | 1 | 40.902222°N 111.927778°W |
| KUBA | Yuba City, California | 56365 | B | 5 | 2.5 | 39.106111°N 121.655°W |
| KUSH | Cushing, Oklahoma | 11201 | D | 5 | 0.07 | 35.986944°N 96.710833°W |
| KVRI | Blaine, Washington | 5350 | B | 50 | 10 | 48.954167°N 122.743333°W |
| KXEW | South Tucson, Arizona | 8144 | B | 1 | 1 | 32.196111°N 110.983889°W |
| KYBC | Cottonwood, Arizona | 35866 | D | 1 | 0.046 | 34.720833°N 111.998611°W |
| WAAM | Ann Arbor, Michigan | 72276 | B | 5 | 5 | 42.192222°N 83.685833°W |
| WAOS | Austell, Georgia | 36157 | D | 20 | 0.067 | 33.809444°N 84.656944°W |
| WCMA | Bayamon, Puerto Rico | 39145 | B | 5 | 5 | 18.360556°N 66.158333°W |
| WCPK | Chesapeake, Virginia | 64003 | D | 4.2 | 0.023 | 36.802778°N 76.282778°W |
| WEJS | Jersey Shore, Pennsylvania | 14223 | D | 1 | 0.02 | 41.225556°N 77.266944°W |
| WHIY | Huntsville, Alabama | 28118 | B | 5 | 0.5 | 34.758889°N 86.643056°W |
| WHOL | Allentown, Pennsylvania | 36987 | D | 1 | 0.056 | 40.5925°N 75.478333°W |
| WIDU | Fayetteville, North Carolina | 70516 | D | 5 | 0.147 | 35.098333°N 78.886667°W |
| WKKX | Wheeling, West Virginia | 72172 | D | 5 | 0.033 | 40.090556°N 80.703056°W |
| WKWF | Key West, Florida | 31636 | B | 0.5 | 0.5 | 24.571389°N 81.740278°W |
| WKZK | North Augusta, South Carolina | 24696 | D | 4 | 0.027 | 33.493611°N 81.997778°W |
| WLAA | Winter Garden, Florida | 55006 | D | 2.2 | 0.035 | 28.568056°N 81.518889°W |
| WLUE | Eminence, Kentucky | 64024 | D | 0.32 | | 38.3525°N 85.185833°W |
| WLVY | Elmira Heights-Horseheads, New York | 55271 | B | 5 | 0.17 | 42.119722°N 76.810278°W |
| WLXE | Rockville, Maryland | 54506 | D | 1.015 | 0.12 | 39.097778°N 77.151111°W |
| WLZX | East Longmeadow, Massachusetts | 58546 | D | 2.5 | | 42.073611°N 72.524722°W |
| WMCR | Oneida, New York | 70890 | D | 1 | 0.02 | 43.084444°N 75.693056°W |
| WMQM | Lakeland, Tennessee | 42369 | D | 50 | 0.035 | 35.176111°N 89.936111°W |
| WPDC | Elizabethtown, Pennsylvania | 32974 | D | 1 | 0.007 | 40.1625°N 76.576667°W |
| WRAX | Bedford, Pennsylvania | 51881 | D | 1 | 0.018 | 40.043056°N 78.503611°W |
| WRPN | Ripon, Wisconsin | 54489 | B | 5 | 5 | 43.816944°N 88.846944°W |
| WRSB | Brockport, New York | 15767 | D | 0.3 | 0.005 | 43.195556°N 77.951389°W |
| WTTF | Tiffin, Ohio | 70527 | D | 0.5 | 0.019 | 41.125556°N 83.231944°W |
| WTZQ | Hendersonville, North Carolina | 68831 | D | 5 | 0.03 | 35.314722°N 82.432778°W |
| WUCT | Algood, Tennessee | 39797 | D | 2.5 | 0.02 | 36.188611°N 85.473056°W |
| WULM | Springfield, Ohio | 55232 | D | 1 | 0.034 | 39.953056°N 83.868611°W |
| WUNR | Brookline, Massachusetts | 10118 | B | 20 | 20 | 42.288889°N 71.189167°W |
| WWRL | New York, New York | 68906 | B | 25 | 5 | 40.795556°N 74.055°W |
| WXVI | Montgomery, Alabama | 63977 | B | 5 | 1 | 32.394444°N 86.289167°W |
| WZNZ | Atlantic Beach, Florida | 48393 | D | 5 | 0.089 | 30.324722°N 81.43°W |
| WZZW | Milton, West Virginia | 506 | D | 5 | 0.026 | 38.429444°N 82.105833°W |
