= Orange Blossom Opry =

Music venue in Weirsdale, Florida

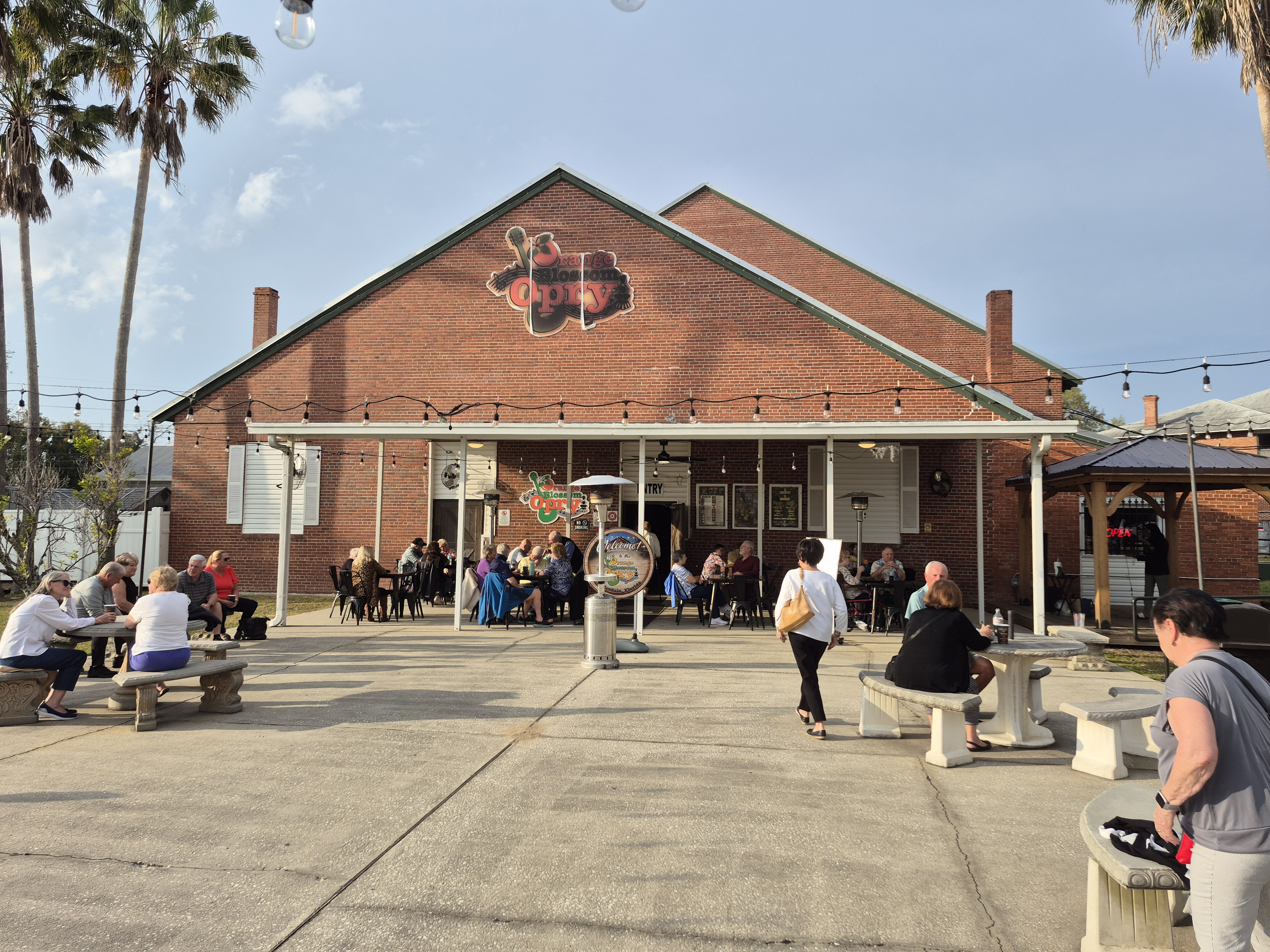
- The entrance of the Orange Blossom Opry, 2025
- Interactive map of Orange Blossom Opry
- Location: Weirsdale, Florida
- Coordinates: 28.98342°N 81.92187°W
- Owner: Roger and Heather Beyers
- Capacity: 550 (Concert Hall)
- Type: Concert hall
- Event: Music

Construction
- Opened: 8 January 1991

Website
- obopry.com

The Orange Blossom Opry is a historic live music venue in Weirsdale, Florida, approximately 20 miles southeast of Ocala.

== Venue ==
Housed in a converted 1920s-era school gymnasium, the 550-seat theater is renowned for its intimate setting and diverse performances, primarily featuring country, bluegrass, and classic rock acts, alongside tribute bands and comedy shows. Established in 1991 as Hawhee's Country Music Opry, it has evolved under various names before adopting its current title, reflecting Florida's citrus heritage. Operated by owners Roger & Heather Beyers since 2014. The Opry offers a family-friendly, smoke-free environment and includes amenities such as the Tin Roof Cafe and Flatlanders Gift Shop. Known for its house band, the Orange Blossom Opry Band, and an annual lineup of notable artists, it has become a cultural landmark in Central Florida, attracting local audiences and visitors from nearby communities like The Villages.

The dramedy movie Bad Senator was filmed in November 2022 at various locations in Marion County, Florida, including the Orange Blossom Opry.
