= XEGEM-AM =

Radio station in Metepec, Mexico, Mexico

- Metepec, Mexico, Mexico; Mexico
- Broadcast area: Toluca
- Frequency: 1600 AM
- Branding: Mexiquense Radio

Ownership
- Owner: Gobierno del Estado de México
- Sister stations: XHGEM-FM, XHGEM-TDT

History
- First air date: May 18, 1983
- Call sign meaning: Gobierno del Estado de México

Technical information
- Class: B
- Power: 2,500 watts day 250 watts night

Links
- Webcast: Listen live
- Website: sistemamexiquense.mx/radio

XEGEM-AM is a radio station in Metepec, State of Mexico, Mexico on 1600 AM, owned by the government of the State of Mexico. It is part of the Radio Mexiquense state radio network and is its flagship on AM, broadcasting to the state capital of Toluca.

XEGEM signed on May 18, 1983 along with XETUL-AM 1080 in Tultitlán, XETEJ-AM 1250 in Tejupilco and XEATL-AM 1520 in Atlacomulco (now XHATL-FM 105.5).

In 1984, television station XHGEM-TV took to air, and in 2002, XHGEM-FM 91.7 came to air. XEGEM and XHGEM FM have separate program schedules.
