= ESPN Radio 1600 =

ESPN Radio 1600 could refer to:

- WPDC, a radio station serving the Harrisburg, PA market
- KGYM, a radio station serving the Cedar Rapids, IA market
- KEPN, a radio station serving the Denver, CO market
