= WDRJ =

WDRJ may refer to:

- WDRJ-LD, a low-power television station (channel 26) licensed to serve Albany, Georgia, United States; see List of television stations in Georgia (U.S. state)
- WMKM, a radio station (1440 AM) licensed to serve Inkster, Michigan, United States, which held the call sign WDRJ from 2006 to 2014
