= KCEC =

KCEC may refer to:

- KCEC-FM, a radio station (104.5 FM) licensed to Wellton, Arizona, United States
- KCEC (TV), a television station (channel 32, virtual 14) licensed to Denver, Colorado, United States
- the ICAO code for Del Norte County Airport
