= XHTY-FM =

XHTY-FM may refer to:

- XHTY-FM (Baja California), a radio station in Tijuana, Baja California, Mexico
- XHTY-FM (Colima), a radio station in Tecomán, Colima, Mexico
