= XECHAP-AM =

Radio station at the Universidad Autónoma Chapingo

Chapingo, State of Mexico; Mexico
- Frequency: 1130 AM
- Branding: Radio Chapingo

Programming
- Format: University radio

Ownership
- Owner: Chapingo Autonomous University

History
- First air date: 1997
- Former call signs: XEUACH-AM (1997–2018)
- Former frequencies: 1610 kHz (1997–2018)
- Call sign meaning: CHAPingo

Technical information
- Class: B
- Power: 2 kW day 60 watts night
- Transmitter coordinates: 19°29′44.6″N 98°53′36.3″W

Links
- Webcast: Listen live
- Website: radio.chapingo.mx

XECHAP-AM is a radio station in Chapingo, State of Mexico, Mexico and is the radio station of the Chapingo Autonomous University. It broadcasts on 1130 AM from studios on the university campus.

== History ==
The first radio station associated with the university broadcast unofficially in the 1930s, when it was the National School of Agriculture (ENA); another, "Radio 6.6 Chapinguito", broadcast from the university in the 1950s under the auspices of professor Hebert del Valle. More broadcasting efforts were discussed in the late 1970s and 1980s, but it would not be until 1989 that a group acquired a 30-watt transmitter and started the modern Radio Chapingo. The station, known then unofficially as "XEUACH", was followed next year by the first proposal for a regional radio station with coverage beyond the university campus, but lack of space posed difficulties for the project. In August 1994, a tower was put into service, and the station went on the air again. With an official permit issued for XEUACH-AM in February 1997, the station on 1610 kHz became Mexico's first AM expanded band station. In 2000, it raised its power to 250 watts, changing to 5,000 watts in 2007.

In 2014, Radio Chapingo filed for its permit renewal two days late, prompting the loss of the station's permit; however, radio service continued. On January 25, 2017, the Federal Telecommunications Institute approved the award of a new public concession to the university for XECHAP-AM 1130. The new dial position was made available in the area when XETOL-AM in Toluca migrated to FM.

On September 7, 2018, XEUACH at 1610 went silent in order to begin the move to 1130. The new station broadcasts with 2,000 watts, less than before, but with increased population coverage compared to 1610. The 1610 frequency was formally surrendered in a letter sent by the university to the IFT on November 12, 2018.
