= KTXZ =

Radio station in Texas, United States

Coordinates: 30°21′38″N 97°39′11″W

Simulcasts KOKE (AM) Pflugerville
- West Lake Hills, Texas; United States
- Broadcast area: Austin-Round Rock metropolitan area
- Frequency: 1560 kHz
- Branding: Tejano 1560

Programming
- Format: Tejano

Ownership
- Owner: Encino Broadcasting; (Encino Broadcasting LLC)
- Sister stations: KELG, KOKE

History
- First air date: June 2, 1981
- Call sign meaning: K TeXaZ

Technical information
- Licensing authority: FCC
- Facility ID: 59278
- Class: B
- Power: 2,500 watts
- Translator: 94.1 K231CZ (Austin)

Links
- Public license information: Public file; LMS

KTXZ (1560 AM) is a radio station, licensed to West Lake Hills, Texas, and is owned by Encino Broadcasting LLC. The station airs a Tejano music format. A transmitter site is located in Northeast Austin and the station has studios along Loop 360 in Southwest Austin. Although the AM site uses 4 masts in daytime, in order to protect other users on the frequency a tight night array of 6 masts sends the signal out at 227 degrees.

KTXZ was purchased by Encino Broadcasting LLC, along with KELG and KOKE on September 24, 2007.

== History ==
KTXZ signed on the air on June 2, 1981 as the sole radio station licensed to West Lake Hills, Texas by former KTBC/7 newscaster Neal Spelce. The station originally played a middle-of-the-road music format called The Music of Your Life. It later changed to a hybrid of oldies rock & roll and current local music under the moniker All Star Rock & Roll.

KTXZ established itself as a Spanish-language radio station on September 1, 1986 when it began broadcasting a Tejano music format which also incorporated pop and country to appeal to Texas-born Hispanics. Fred Cantu, now a popular TV news anchor in Austin, was the program director of KTXZ through these early format changes.

The station remained in the hands of Neal Spelce until it was sold to Dynamic Radio Broadcasting Corporation, which was founded by Jose Jaime Garcia Sr. on September 1, 1994. Dynamic was as the time KTXZ's chief competitor already operating Spanish-language stations KKLB, KELG and KFON. On January 3, 2005 Dynamic Broadcasting sold all four radio stations to Border Media Partners for $19,000,000.

The Garcia family, now operating as Encino Broadcasting, repurchased KELG and KTXZ along with KOKE from Border Media Partners for $5,500,000 on September 24, 2007. Until recently, KTXZ played a Latin alternative rock format under the moniker of "Planeta 1560".

On the night of August 29, 2008 KTXZ switched formats to Tejano music.
