= XHTOM-FM =

Radio station in Toluca, State of Mexico, Mexico

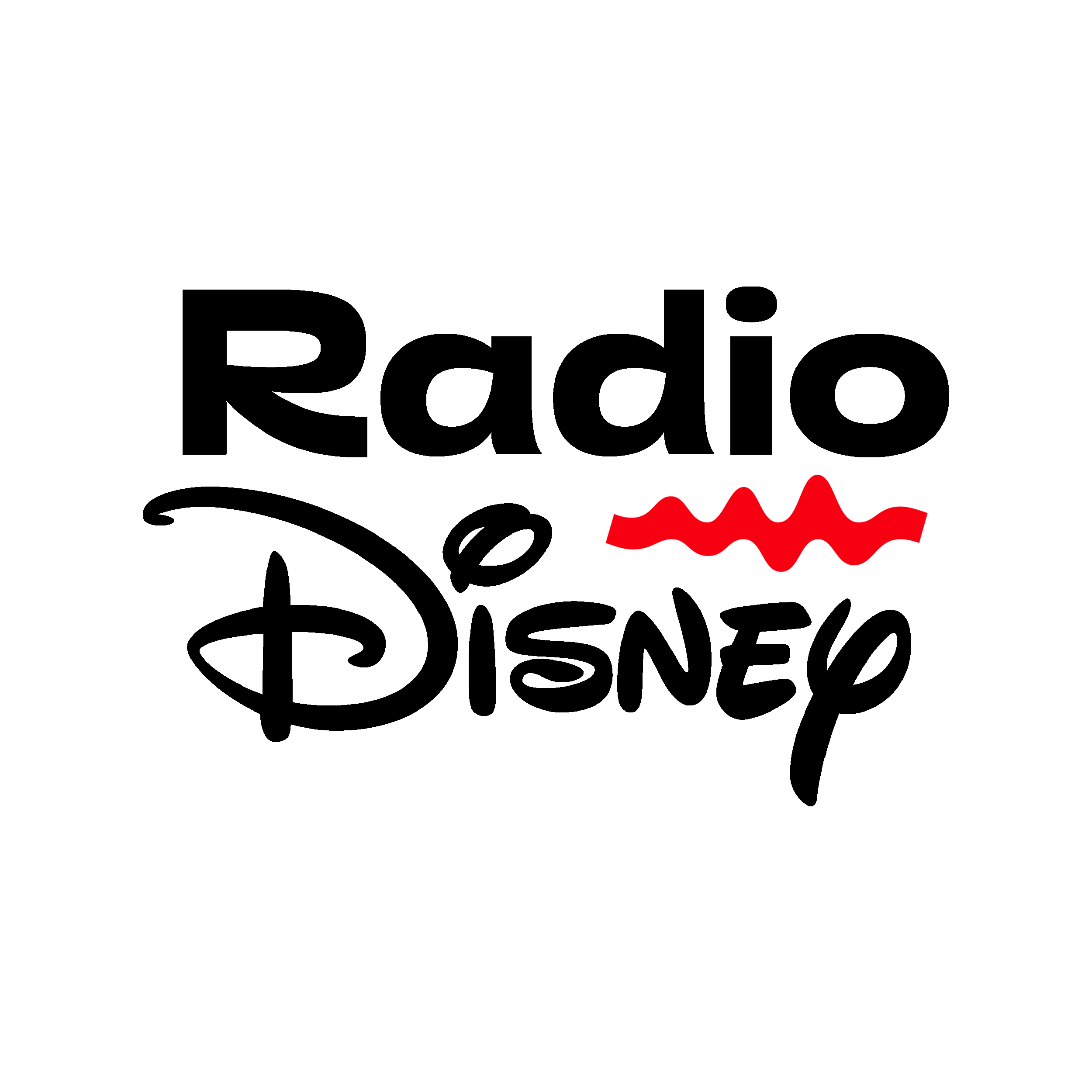
- Toluca, State of Mexico; Mexico
- Frequency: 102.1 MHz
- Branding: Radio Disney

Programming
- Format: Contemporary hit radio

Ownership
- Owner: Grupo Radiorama; (XHTOM-FM, S.A. de C.V.)
- Operator: Grupo Siete Comunicación
- Sister stations: XHEDT-FM

History
- First air date: April 1, 1992 (concession)
- Call sign meaning: Toluca, Estado de México

Technical information
- Licensing authority: CRT
- Class: B
- ERP: 50,000 watts
- HAAT: 46.17 m (151.5 ft)

Links
- Webcast: Listen live
- Website: radiodisney.disneylatino.com/mexico www.gruposiete.com.mx

XHTOM-FM is a radio station in Toluca, State of Mexico, Mexico. Broadcasting on 102.1 FM, XHTOM is operated by Grupo Siete Comunicación and carries the Radio Disney format.

== History ==
XHTOM received its concession on April 1, 1992. It was originally owned by Radiorama subsidiary Radio Celebridad, S.A. However, Grupo Siete operates the station. From 1996 to 1999, the station was known as "Cañón 102.1", playing Regional Mexican music, before flipping to a pop format known as Stereo 102.1. In 2005, the station shifted toward an alternative direction under the name Neurotica FM. XHTOM-FM was a franchise of Los 40 Principales from 2009 to 2013, but it remained in the pop format after under the names +FM (Más Radio) and Neurótik.

On April 7, 2021, the station became Grupo Siete's second station in the Radio Disney franchise after XHFO-FM in Mexico City.
