= XEITE-AM =

Radio station in Mexico City

- Mexico City; Mexico
- Frequency: 830 kHz
- Branding: Lokura FM Rock

Programming
- Format: Rock music

Ownership
- Owner: Capital Media; (Radiodifusoras Capital, S.A. de C.V.)

History
- First air date: July 5, 1940
- Former call signs: XELA-AM (1940–2002)
- Call sign meaning: Former owner Imagen Telecomunicaciones

Technical information
- Licensing authority: CRT
- Class: B
- Power: 25,000 watts (day); 5,000 watts (night)
- Transmitter coordinates: 19°22′26.6″N 99°06′34.2″W

Links
- Webcast: Listen live
- Website: lavozradio.net

XEITE-AM is a radio station in Mexico City, broadcasting on 830 kHz. The station is owned by Capital Media and currently is known as Lokura FM, a rock format.

== History ==
=== XELA-AM ===
XELA-AM began broadcasting on July 5, 1940, with a classical music format. For many years it was one of the few sources of classical music available to ordinary Mexican citizens. XELA was able to acquire quality sound recordings from the United States, England and France, even though it started with a very low budget, through an exchange program for Mexican music recordings. The station was acquired by Grupo Imagen in 1963.

From the 1970s to the mid-1980s, the station simulcast on XELA-FM 98.5. That station was split off in the mid-1980s. One long-running feature of the station was La hora sinfónica Corona, the dinner hour symphony which aired continuously for 59 years.

The station was threatened with closure in 2000, but protests by listeners from laborers to the intelligentsia keep it open for a while longer. Their slogan was "Buena música desde la Ciudad de México!" ("Good music from Mexico City!").

=== XEITE-AM ===
On January 2, 2002, Imagen dropped the classical music format for sports, as "Estadio W 830" (a format now found on XEX-AM) and changed the callsign to XEITE-AM. The change resulted in protests from the station's dedicated listeners; some Mexican cultural figures, including Elena Poniatowska, José Luis Cuevas, Vicente Quirarte and Víctor Hugo Rascón, formed the "National XELA Rescue Committee" (or CONAREXELA) on July 10 of that year. The group sought for the Instituto Mexicano de la Radio to take over the station, but IMER refused, saying it would incorporate that format into its own XHIMER-FM 94.5.

In 2004, the station was sold to Grupo Radio Capital (now known as Capital Media). The Radio Capital format included news and sports programming as well as contemporary music.

At 7 p.m. on February 14, 2019, Radio Capital in Mexico City ceased operations to make way for the relocation of the Quiéreme romantic format from Grupo Siete from 1440 XEEST-AM, which shares transmission facilities with XEITE.

In December 2019, the station switched to Christian programming under the name "Ondas de Paz". On February 14, 2020, Ondas de Paz moved back to 1440 and Capital resumed programming the 830 frequency.

On March 1, 2021, the religious format Radio Omega entered, after the discarded alliance with Grupo Radio Centro. On August 1, 2024, Radio Omega left the frequency for more than three years, after which Capital Media took over the frequency.

On August 5, the format was switched to Adult Hits under the "Lokura Rock" name, simulcasting the format of XHCH-FM/Toluca. On November 22, Lokura Rock was replaced by Christian format "La Voz". The change was reversed on June 7, 2025.
