= Bad Senator =

American drama film

- Theatrical release poster
- Directed by: Chad W. Richardson
- Written by: Chad W. Richardson
- Produced by: Laura West
- Starring: Bob Gallagher; Rob Moore; Vanessa Neff; Kaylee Amante
- Production companies: New Zealand Son Films, Shadow Dreamworks LLC
- Distributed by: Indie Rights
- Release date: November 17, 2023
- Country: United States
- Language: English
- Budget: $200,000

Bad Senator is a 2023 American dramedy film written and directed by Chad W. Richardson in his directorial debut. The film stars Bob Gallagher as a narcissistic retired U.S. senator facing the twilight of his life, alongside Rob Moore, Vanessa Neff, and Kaylee Amante. It explores regret, redemption, and familial estrangement, blending dark humor with poignant drama.

== Plot ==
Richard Van Sutton, a former U.S. senator renowned for his bombastic personality and self-serving political career, retires to a tranquil retirement community. As his health deteriorates, he contemplates a life marked by superficial achievements, acknowledging the loss of his ex-wife Etta's (Debbie Orta) love and his estranged daughter Eliana's (Kaylee Amanate) respect. His sole companion is Jocko Stone (Rob Moore), a neighbor and embittered retired Marine who feels abandoned by the country after being injured and compelled to retire from the military.

The story takes a turn when Iris, a yoga YouTuber, moves into the community between Van Sutton and Stone. Her arrival disrupts their stagnant, combative routine and challenges the status quo. What begins as a neighborly feud evolves into an unexpected alliance, as Iris helps both men confront the pain of their pasts and rediscover their inner dreams. Through this journey, Van Sutton reflects on his legacy, while Stone's gruff exterior softens, leading to a bittersweet resolution that blends humor with emotional depth.

== Cast ==
- Bob Gallagher as Richard Van Sutton, a retired senator grappling with his legacy
- Rob Moore as Jocko Stone, an embittered ex-Marine with an injury, Van Sutton's friend and rival
- Vanessa Neff as Iris Hope, a quirky Yoga YouTuber
- Kaylee Amante as Eliana, Sutton's estranged daughter
- Billy Grey (Hunter Kohl)
- Gerty Lewis (Shirley Bryant)
- Etta Van Sutton (Debbie Orta)
- George Van Sutton (George Richardson)

== Production ==
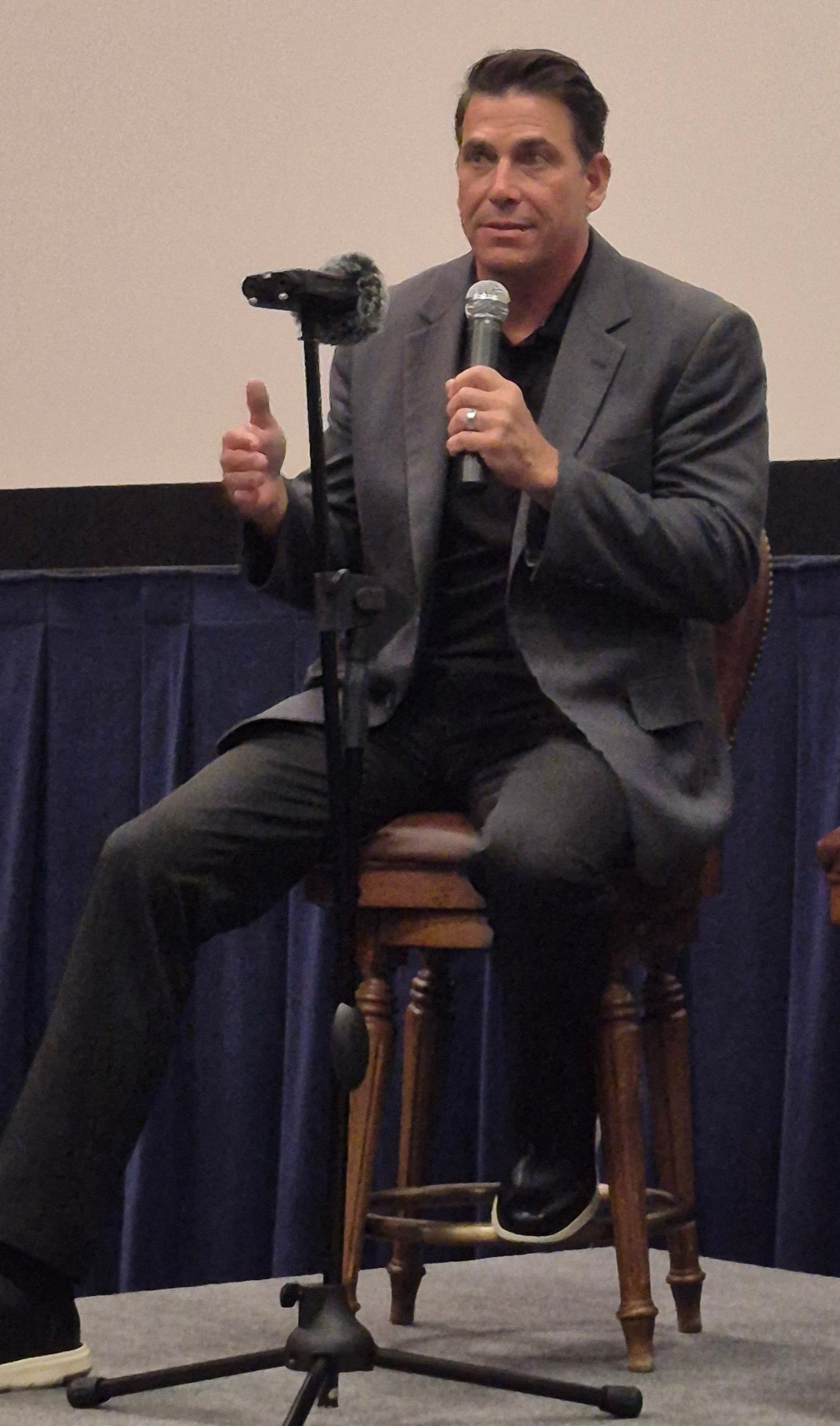
Richardson answering questions at a screening of Bad Senator.

=== Development ===
Richardson conceived the film as a character study of a flawed public figure. Inspired by real-life political scandals and his experiences as a 25-year veteran of the Metro Detroit Police Department, he served in roles ranging from patrol to SWAT to homicide detective. The screenplay was written over multiple years while Richardson worked in the film industry after retiring.

=== Casting ===
Bob Gallagher, a Boston-based actor with a growing reputation in indie films, was cast as Sutton after an extensive audition involving over 2,000 submissions. Richardson praised Gallagher's ability to balance comedy and pathos, noting his improvisational skills as key to shaping the role. Rob Moore, Vanessa Neff, and Kaylee Amante were selected for their chemistry with Gallagher, with Neff bringing prior experience from dramatic roles and Amante making her feature film debut.

=== Filming ===
Bad Senator was filmed in during November 2022 at various locations in Marion County, Florida, with two notable sites being the Orange Blossom Opry in Weirsdale and the Del Webb Spruce Creek retirement community in Summerfield. The Orange Blossom Opry, a local music venue, features prominently in the film, showcasing its cultural significance to the area. It hosted a screening on November 26, 2023, accompanied by a performance from the Orange Blossom Opry Band. Del Webb Spruce Creek, a gated community, served as a primary filming location, with scenes captured throughout its neighborhoods, country club, and community center, including an opening shot of its distinctive circular fountain. The production incorporated over 400 Spruce Creek residents as extras, highlighting the community's involvement in the project. These locations were chosen to reflect the film's setting and to leverage the local atmosphere and talent, as noted by Richardson, whose personal connection to Spruce Creek influenced the decision to film there.

== Release ==
Bad Senator premiered on November 17, 2023, at the Horizon Center in the Del Webb Spruce Creek retirement community in Summerfield, Florida, where it was filmed. This event, attended by over 400 residents, marked the movie's initial public unveiling. Another release screening was on November 26, 2023, at the Orange Blossom Opry, with a Q&A featuring Richardson and star Bob Gallagher.po

After post production editing and a new distributor, the movie was screened again in The Villages in early March 2025.

== See also ==
- List of American films of 2023
- Dramedy
