= XHMXS-FM =

Radio station in Sicuicho, Michoacán

Sicuicho, Los Reyes, Michoacán; Mexico
- Frequency: 104.5 MHz
- Branding: La Mexicanita

Programming
- Format: Noncommercial community radio

Ownership
- Owner: La Mexicanita Sapichu, A.C.

History
- First air date: September 26, 2016 (social community concession)
- Former frequencies: 88.9 FM (as a pirate)
- Call sign meaning: La MeXicanita Sapichu, A.C. (concessionaire)

Technical information
- Class: A
- ERP: 256 watts
- HAAT: 83.6 m
- Transmitter coordinates: 19°39′53.35″N 102°19′50″W

Links
- Webcast: XHMXS-FM stream
- Website: La Mexicanita Sapichu on Facebook

XHMXS-FM is a community radio station licensed to serve the communities of Sicuicho, Cherato, Cheratillo and 18 de Marzo, all located in Los Reyes, Michoacán. XHMXS broadcasts on 104.5 FM and is owned by La Mexicanita Sapichu, A.C.

== History ==
XHMXS received its social community concession on September 26, 2016. The station had previously operated as a pirate on 88.9 MHz.
