= XHDC-FM =

Radio station in Aguascalientes, Aguascalientes, Mexico

- Aguascalientes, Aguascalientes; Mexico
- Frequency: 104.5 FM
- Branding: Amor Es

Programming
- Format: Romantic

Ownership
- Owner: Grupo Radiofónico ZER; (Radio XEDC, S.A. de C.V.)
- Sister stations: XHAGA-FM, XHARZ-FM, XHEY-FM, XHLTZ-FM

History
- First air date: October 29, 1993 (concession)

Technical information
- Licensing authority: CRT
- Class: B1
- ERP: 25 kW
- HAAT: 89.91 meters (295.0 ft)
- Transmitter coordinates: 21°52′31″N 102°17′17″W

Links
- Webcast: Listen live
- Website: grupozer.mx

XHDC-FM is a radio station on 104.5 FM in Aguascalientes, Aguascalientes, Mexico. The station is owned by Grupo Radiofónico Zer and carries a romantic music format known as Amor Es (Love Is).

== History ==
XHDC began as XEDC-AM 1050, with a concession awarded to Radio Vinculación, S.A., on October 29, 1993. It was sold in 2000 and migrated to FM in 2011.

The station had formerly been owned by ACIR outright and carried other formats, including a version of the news format then used on XHM-FM in Mexico City rebadged as "1050 Noticias". From 2011 until early 2017, XHDC used ACIR's Amor romantic music format, which it dumped in February 2017 with a subtle name change to "Amor Es 104.5".
