= XHTTT-FM =

Radio station in Colima, Colima, Mexico

- Colima, Colima; Mexico
- Frequency: 104.5 FM
- Branding: Lokura FM Grupera

Programming
- Format: Grupera

Ownership
- Owner: Capital Media; (Telecomunicaciones CH, S.A. de C.V.)

History
- First air date: October 21, 1961 (concession)
- Former frequencies: 1470 kHz, 930 kHz

Technical information
- Class: B1
- ERP: 10 kW
- HAAT: -13.4 m
- Transmitter coordinates: 19°15′24″N 103°43′28″W

Links
- Webcast: Listen live
- Website: lokura.fm

XHTTT-FM is a radio station on 104.5 FM in Colima, Colima, Mexico. The station is owned by Capital Media and carries its Lokura FM Grupera format.

== History ==
XHTTT began as XEDS-AM 1470, with a concession awarded on October 21, 1961 to Luz María H. de Águilar. The station had signed on with a test signal on August 28 of that year and brought 1470 back into use in Colima after XERL-AM moved to 710 kHz in December 1960. It was sold to Radio y Televisión de Colima, S.A. de C.V. in the late 1960s. In the 1990s, XEDS relocated to 930 AM and then changed its call sign to XETTT-AM. Ultimately, it migrated to FM in 2011, sharing a transmitter facility with then-RadioLevy stablemate XHERL-FM.

Capital Media acquired XHTTT-FM in 2013. In June 2019, Capital ceased operation of the station, with XHTTT relaunching under new management with the provisional name 104.5 FM Pura Fiesta while holding a name-the-station contest. The station would later be known as Aktiva under the local group's operation, which ended August 3, 2020, with Capital resuming operations under its new Lokura FM adult hits format. The new format did not last long, as 28 days later, the station began airing news/talk programming from El Heraldo Radio.

On April 1, 2022, Heraldo Radio dropped eight stations, including XHTTT; Capital then returned the station to Lokura FM. Lokura FM was split into rock, pop, and grupera brands in 2023, with the pop format being installed at XHTTT.
