= XHGEM-FM =

Public radio station in Metepec, State of Mexico

Metepec, Mexico, Mexico; Mexico
- Broadcast area: Toluca
- Frequency: 91.7 MHz
- Branding: Mexiquense Radio

Ownership
- Owner: Gobierno del Estado de México
- Sister stations: XEGEM-AM, XHGEM-TDT

History
- First air date: 2002
- Call sign meaning: Gobierno del Estado de México

Technical information
- ERP: 25 kW

Links
- Website: sistemamexiquense.mx/radio

XHGEM-FM is a radio station in Metepec on 91.7 MHz, owned by the government of the State of Mexico. It is part of the Radio Mexiquense state radio network and is its flagship on FM, broadcasting to the state capital of Toluca. It signed on air in 2002, joining AM station XEGEM-AM 1600. 1600 AM and 91.7 FM have separate program schedules.
