= XEEST-AM =

Radio station in Mexico City

- Mexico City; Mexico
- Broadcast area: Greater Mexico City
- Frequency: 1440 AM
- Branding: Ondas De Vida

Programming
- Format: Christian radio

Ownership
- Owner: Grupo Siete Comunicación; (Grupo Radial Siete, S.A. de C.V.)
- Sister stations: XHFO-FM, XHCME-FM

History
- First air date: 1942
- Former call signs: XELZ-AM
- Call sign meaning: Station was known in the 1980s as Estudiantes AM

Technical information
- Licensing authority: CRT
- Class: B
- Power: 25 kW day 1 kW night
- Transmitter coordinates: 19°22′26.6″N 99°06′34.2″W

Links
- Webcast: Listen live
- Website: ondasdevida1440.com

XEEST-AM is a radio station on 1440 AM in Mexico City. The station airs Christian programming under the name "Ondas De Vida".

== History ==
XELZ-AM received its first concession on December 1, 1942, to María Cardona de Zetina. For most of its history under this callsign, it broadcast ranchera music and was known as "Radio LZ". It was sold to Radio Variedades, S.A. in 1961, and became a part of Grupo Radio Centro. In 1974, the tropical format Radio AI changed from 1320 AM to 1440.

In 1982, the station was relaunched as "Estudiantes AM", targeting a youth audience with pop in Spanish, with its callsign changing to XEEST-AM. This format evolved into "Radio 14-40" in 1986 with Spanish-language rock joining the musical mix. Shortly thereafter, the station changed names again, this time to "Radio Alegría", but kept its format, eventually incorporating the wave of Spanish-language rap. On May 17, 1993, the format was changed and the station became "Radio Éxitos" (a name that had been used on XERC-AM until 1988), with 1960s and 1970s classic rock in English.

On January 1, 1996, Grupo Radio Centro ceded the station's operational control to Grupo Siete, after having taken control of XHFO-FM three years earlier. Under Grupo Siete, the station changed yet again, to "Sonido Crystal" with a grupera format; in 1998, it became the news-oriented "Radio Noticias 14-40". By 2005, it offered ballads and spoken programs as "La Reina del Hogar"; this changed to the all-spoken "Cambio 14-40" in 2007. The station took on a romantic format in 2012; for the first two months from February 13 until April, it was known as "Radio Amor 14-40" but not long after changed to its "Quiéreme 14-40" name, possibly to avoid trademark legal issues with Grupo ACIR's Amor format airing on XHSH-FM.

On May 15, 2017, Quiéreme moved from XEEST to the stronger XEINFO-AM 1560. The move took place the same day as a major reshuffle of the AM stations owned by Grupo Radio Centro. XEEST returned to the air on October 2 after having been relocated to a new transmitter site in the Atlazolpa neighborhood of Mexico City, shared with Radio Centro's XEQR-AM 1030 and unrelated station XEITE-AM 830.

On February 14, 2019, Quiéreme moved to XEITE-AM 830, and 1440 fell silent again.

In August 2019, GRC officially ceded the ownership of XEEST to Grupo Siete, after the latter also resumed operations of its own XHFO-FM; the concession transfer was approved by the IFT on September 2, 2020.

On February 15, 2020, XEEST returned to the air with the Christian format "Ondas de Paz". The name changed to "Ondas de Vida" on March 22, 2021, with a change in management but retaining the format.
