= WIFL-LP =

Coordinates: 29.0418°N 81.9356°W

- Weirsdale, Florida; United States
- Frequency: 104.5 MHz

Programming
- Format: Variety

Ownership
- Owner: Lake Weir Chamber of Commerce

History
- Former call signs: WHZL-LP (January 12, 2006-November 19, 2010); WORJ-LP (November 19, 2010-June 14, 2011)

Technical information
- Licensing authority: FCC
- Facility ID: 135770
- Class: L1
- Power: 100 watts
- HAAT: 24.9 meters

Links
- Public license information: LMS

WIFL-LP/104.5 was a low-power F.M. radio station licensed to Weirsdale, Florida, United States. It was owned by the Lake Weir Chamber of Commerce. It was initially licensed as WHZL-LP on January 12, 2006, changing callsigns to WORJ-LP on November 19, 2010 & changed callsigns again on June 14, 2011 to WIFL-LP. WIFL-LP transmitted on 104.5 MHz (Channel 283).
