= XHATL-FM =

Radio station in Atlacomulco, State of Mexico

Atlacomulco, Mexico, Mexico; Mexico
- Frequency: 105.5 MHz
- Branding: Mexiquense Radio

Ownership
- Owner: Gobierno del Estado de México

History
- First air date: May 18, 1983 (on AM)
- Call sign meaning: ATLacomulco

Technical information
- ERP: 6 kW
- HAAT: 17.08 meters
- Transmitter coordinates: 19°47′24″N 99°50′50″W

Links
- Website: sistemamexiquense.mx/radio

XHATL-FM is a radio station in Atlacomulco on 105.5 MHz, owned by the government of the State of Mexico. It is part of the Radio Mexiquense state radio network.

Originally XEATL-AM 1520, the station signed on May 18, 1983 along with XEGEM-AM 1600 serving Toluca, XETUL-AM 1080 in Tultitlán and XETEJ-AM 1250 in Tejupilco. The station received permission to move to FM in 2012.
