= XHEVE-FM =

Radio station in Colima, Colima, Mexico

- Colima, Colima; Mexico
- Frequency: 93.3 FM
- Branding: Stereo Vida

Programming
- Format: Romantic

Ownership
- Owner: Grupo Radiorama; (XEVE, S.A. de C.V.)
- Sister stations: XHERL-FM, XHTY-FM

History
- First air date: June 12, 1990 (concession)

Technical information
- ERP: 25 kW
- Transmitter coordinates: 19°14′58″N 103°42′28″W

Links
- Webcast: Listen live
- Website: radioramacolima.com

XHEVE-FM is a radio station on 93.3 FM in Colima, Colima, Mexico owned by Radiorama and carrying its Stereo Vida format.

== History ==
XHEVE began as XEVE-AM 960 (later 1020), with a concession awarded to Comunicación y Cultura, S.A., on June 12, 1990. It was sold to Grupo ACIR in 1996 and migrated to FM in 2011.

Sometime after, it was sold to Radiorama and now broadcasts its La Luperrona format after a stint as La Más Picuda. The concession was transferred in 2015.
