= XHKE-FM =

Radio station in Navojoa, Sonora

- Navojoa, Sonora; Mexico
- Broadcast area: Navojoa, Sonora
- Frequency: 104.5 FM
- Branding: KE 104.5 FM

Programming
- Format: Grupera

Ownership
- Owner: Uniradio; (Promotora Unimedios, S.A. de C.V.)

History
- First air date: May 15, 1956 (concession)

Technical information
- Licensing authority: CRT
- Class: B1
- ERP: 2.7 kW
- HAAT: 318.5 m (1,045 ft)
- Transmitter coordinates: 27°04′29″N 109°28′06″W

Links
- Website: Uniradio Navojoa

XHKE-FM is a radio station on 104.5 FM in Navojoa, Sonora. It is owned by Uniradio and carries a grupera format under the KE 104.5 FM name.

== History ==
XEKE-AM 980 received its concession on May 15, 1956. By the 2000s, it was owned by Joaquín Santiago Terminel Urrea; XEKE was sold to Uniradio in 2005.

XEKE migrated to FM in 2011 as XHKE-FM 104.5.
