= XHERL-FM =

Radio station in Colima, Colima

- Colima, Colima; Mexico
- Broadcast area: Colima
- Frequency: 98.9 MHz
- Branding: Super 98.9

Programming
- Format: Pop

Ownership
- Owner: Grupo Radio Levy; (XERL, Sucesores de J. Roberto Levy, S.A. de C.V.)
- Operator: Grupo Radiorama
- Sister stations: XHZZZ-FM, XHEMAX-FM, XHECO-FM

History
- First air date: October 12, 1940
- Former frequencies: 820 kHz
- Call sign meaning: Founding owner Roberto Levy

Technical information
- Class: B1
- ERP: 12,000 watts
- Transmitter coordinates: 19°15′24″N 103°43′28″W

Links
- Website: www.audiorama.mx/estacion/super/colima/98.9FM

XHERL-FM is a radio station on 98.9 FM in Colima, Colima, Mexico.

== History ==
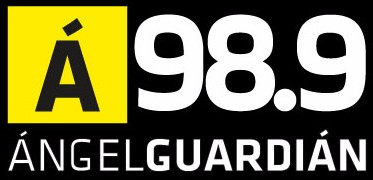
Logo as "Ángel Guardián" used in 2016

J. Roberto Levy obtained the concession for XERL-AM, an AM station then broadcasting on 1280 kHz, on July 26, 1943, though the station had begun operation in October 1940. It moved to 820 kHz in 1953, 1470 in the late 1950s, and finally to 710 on December 26, 1960. J. Roberto Levy died in July 1956, while he was serving as Municipal President of Colima, but the station has remained in his family.

It migrated to FM in 2011.

On June 21, 2019, RadioLevy announced that Grupo Radiorama would take over operation of its three radio stations on July 1, 2019. New Audiorama formats formally launched on the RadioLevy stations on July 15.
