= XHMLO-FM =

Radio station in Malinalco–Tenancingo, State of Mexico

Malinalco, State of Mexico; Mexico
- Broadcast area: Tenancingo
- Frequency: 104.9 MHz
- Branding: Radio Crystal

Programming
- Format: Regional Mexican

Ownership
- Owner: Grupo Siete; (Grupo Radial Siete, S.A. de C.V.)
- Sister stations: XHCME-FM

History
- First air date: October 21, 1994 (concession)
- Call sign meaning: "Malinalco"

Technical information
- ERP: 500 watts

Links
- Webcast: Listen live
- Website: radiocrystal.mx

XHMLO-FM is a radio station in Malinalco, State of Mexico. Broadcasting on 104.9 FM, XHMLO is owned by Grupo Siete and is known as Radio Crystal.

== History ==
XHMLO Bengala logo, used until 2017

XHMLO received its concession on October 21, 1994.

In 2017, XHMLO and XHEDT-FM in Toluca became the last Grupo Siete-owned stations to ditch the Bengala grupera format and moved to Crystal.
