= XETEJ-AM =

Radio station in Tejupilco de Hidalgo, State of Mexico

Tejupilco, Mexico, Mexico; Mexico
- Frequency: 1250 kHz
- Branding: Mexiquense Radio

Ownership
- Owner: Gobierno del Estado de México

History
- First air date: May 18, 1983
- Call sign meaning: TEJupilco

Technical information
- Class: C
- Power: .5 kW day.25 kW night

Links
- Website: sistemamexiquense.mx/radio

XETEJ-AM is a radio station in Tejupilco on 1250 kHz, owned by the government of the State of Mexico. It is part of the Radio Mexiquense state radio network.

XETEJ signed on May 18, 1983 along with XEGEM-AM 1600 serving Toluca, XETUL-AM 1080 in Tultitlán and XEATL-AM 1520 in Atlacomulco (now XHATL-FM 105.5).
