= KUSH =

- Cushing, Oklahoma; United States
- Frequency: 1600 kHz

Programming
- Format: Full-service

Ownership
- Owner: Richard Sellers; (Oil Patch Radio, Inc.)

History
- First air date: 1953

Technical information
- Licensing authority: FCC
- Facility ID: 11201
- Class: D
- Power: 5,000 watts (day); 70 watts (night)
- Transmitter coordinates: 35.98639°N 96.71028°W
- Translator: 101.5 K268DK (Cushing)

Links
- Public license information: Public file; LMS
- Webcast: Listen live
- Website: 1600kush.com

KUSH 1600 AM is a radio station licensed to Cushing, Oklahoma. The station broadcasts a Full-service format, consisting of local and national talk, sports, and a music format consisting of Americana, country, Texas, and local Oklahoma music with a progressive element in overnights.

KUSH is owned by Richard Sellers, through licensee Oil Patch Radio, Inc. As of 2022, Molly Payne is the general manager. With the station since 1998, Hugh Foley is the program director, music director, sports director, and producer of Native Air. Former on-air talents include the late Sean Kelly and Colton Cravens, who went on to found Oklahoma Tornado Database. Aaron Kelly, Bruce Vogt, Mary Kelly, Tyler Sneed, the late Brian McBrayer, Sally Wright, Ron Godfried, Donna Judd-Hodges, Nokose Foley, and Joyce Abrams rounded out the team over a period from 2013 to 2016. Cravens and Sneed provided the backbone for Cushing and University of Tulsa programming after owner Sean Kelly was killed in a late January 2014 wreck.

Cravens, as athletic/sports director and director of iTV operations, went on to grow into a marketing professional and was integral in helping upgrade the station's equipment and evolving its CityLinkTV affiliates, with successful expansion into Drumright which Kelly had acquired media rights to (along with Stroud) in 2012. When Cravens left, University of Tulsa affiliation ended after a long run as Sellers made the decision to drop from the Golden Hurricane network. The stations expansion onto FM has had some issues with signal but is still viewed as a positive for Oilpatch and KUSH. Sellers died early on the morning of January 13, 2023, 18 days prior to the 10th Anniversary of Kelly's death after a brief struggle to survive the wreck.

== Translators ==
Call sign	Frequency	City of license	FID	ERP (W)	HAAT	Class	FCC info
K268DK	101.5 FM	Cushing, Oklahoma	200305	250	13.7 m (45 ft)	D	LMS
