= WIBH =

Coordinates: 37°26′45″N 89°15′00″W

- Anna, Illinois; United States
- Broadcast area: Carbondale-Marion-Herrin
- Frequency: 1440 kHz
- Branding: WIBH 102.5 FM 1440 AM

Programming
- Format: Classic Country

Ownership
- Owner: WIBH, Inc.

History
- First air date: January 16, 1957 (first license granted)

Technical information
- Licensing authority: FCC
- Facility ID: 68795
- Class: D
- Power: 500 watts day 109 watts night
- Translator: 102.5 MHz (W273DE)

Links
- Public license information: Public file; LMS
- Website: http://www.wibhradio.com/

WIBH (1440 AM) is a radio station licensed to Anna, Illinois, United States. The station airs a Classic Country format, and is currently owned by WIBH, Inc.
