= KCEC-FM =

- Wellton, Arizona; United States
- Broadcast area: Yuma, Arizona
- Frequency: 104.5 MHz
- Branding: La Campesina 104.5 FM

Programming
- Format: Regional Mexican

Ownership
- Owner: Chavez Media

History
- First air date: 2001

Technical information
- Licensing authority: FCC
- Facility ID: 21207
- Class: C2
- ERP: 1,750 watts
- HAAT: 381 meters (1,250 ft)
- Transmitter coordinates: 32°40′22″N 114°20′14″W

Links
- Public license information: Public file; LMS
- Webcast: Listen Live
- Website: campesina.com

KCEC-FM (104.5 FM, La Campesina 104.5 FM) is a radio station broadcasting a Regional Mexican format. Licensed to Wellton, Arizona, United States, and with a studio in Yuma, Arizona, it serves the Yuma area. The station is owned by Chavez Media.
