= KBTW =

Radio station in Lenwood, California

- Lenwood, California; United States
- Broadcast area: Barstow, California
- Frequency: 104.5 MHz
- Branding: Radio Lazer 104.5

Programming
- Format: Regional Mexican

Ownership
- Owner: Lazer Media; (Lazer Licenses, LLC)

History
- Call sign meaning: Barstow

Technical information
- Licensing authority: FCC
- Class: A
- ERP: 1,100 watts
- HAAT: 234 meters (768 ft)
- Transmitter coordinates: 34°58′15″N 117°02′22″W

Links
- Public license information: Public file; LMS

KBTW (104.5 FM) is a radio station broadcasting Spanish language format to the Barstow, California, area. The station is owned by Lazer Media and licensed to Lazer Licenses, LLC.
