= WYCJ-LP =

- Simpsonville, South Carolina; United States
- Frequency: 104.5 MHz

Programming
- Format: Religious

Ownership
- Owner: The Church in Simpsonville

Technical information
- Licensing authority: FCC
- Facility ID: 131927
- Class: L1
- ERP: 89 watts
- HAAT: 31.5 meters (103 ft)
- Transmitter coordinates: 34°45′18″N 82°12′43″W

Links
- Public license information: LMS
- Website: churchinsimpsonville.org

WYCJ-LP (104.5 FM) is a low-power radio station broadcasting a religious format. Licensed to Simpsonville, South Carolina, United States, the station is currently owned by The Church in Simpsonville.
