= WWCL =

- Lehigh Acres, Florida; United States
- Broadcast area: Fort Myers, Florida
- Frequency: 1440 kHz

Programming
- Format: Spanish Christian music and teaching
- Affiliations: Radio Visión Cristiana

Ownership
- Owner: Radio Visión Cristiana Management

History
- First air date: 1971
- Former call signs: WLEH (1967–1969); WAYK (1969–1984); WGTR (1984–1986); WOOJ (1986–1989)

Technical information
- Licensing authority: FCC
- Facility ID: 50233
- Class: B
- Power: 5,000 watts day; 1,000 watts night
- Transmitter coordinates: 26°36′9.26″N 81°33′32.29″W

Links
- Public license information: Public file; LMS
- Webcast: Listen Live
- Website: RadioVision.net

WWCL (1440 AM) is a Spanish Christian music and teaching station. Licensed to Lehigh Acres, Florida, United States, the station serves the Fort Myers area.
