= XHARO-FM =

Community radio station in Ciudad Nezahualcóyotl, State of Mexico

Ciudad Nezahualcóyotl, State of Mexico; Mexico
- Frequency: 104.5 MHz
- Branding: Radio Relax

Programming
- Format: Noncommercial community radio

Ownership
- Owner: Radio Aro, A.C.

History
- First air date: March 25, 2010
- Former call signs: XHSCIV-FM (2022) (Note: Concession was reawarded after a discontinuity in February 2022. Call sign changed back in September.)
- Call sign meaning: Radio ARO, A.C.

Technical information
- ERP: .05 kW
- HAAT: 2.6 meters
- Transmitter coordinates: 19°24′00″N 98°59′20″W

Links
- Website: www.relax1045.com

XHARO-FM is a community radio station in Ciudad Nezahualcóyotl, State of Mexico, broadcasting on 104.5 FM. The permit for the station is held by Radio Aro, A.C., and the station is known as Radio Rélax. XHARO is a member of AMARC México.

== History ==
The station signed on in March 2010 after soliciting a permit late in 2008.
