= WMKM =

Radio station in Inkster–Detroit, Michigan

- Inkster, Michigan; United States
- Broadcast area: Detroit metropolitan area
- Frequency: 1440 kHz
- Branding: Gospel 1440 WMKM

Programming
- Format: Urban Gospel

Ownership
- Owner: Timothy Gallagher; (Great Lakes Radio—Detroit, LLC)

History
- First air date: November 1956; 69 years ago (as WCHB)
- Former call signs: WCHB (1956-2/22/90); WMKM (2/22/90-11/30/05); WRJD (11/30/05-12/8/05); WMKM (12/8/05-4/5/06); WDRJ (4/5/06-10/6/14)

Technical information
- Licensing authority: FCC
- Facility ID: 24966
- Class: B
- Power: 1,000 watts
- Transmitter coordinates: 42°15′22″N 83°21′48″W

Links
- Public license information: Public file; LMS
- Webcast: Listen Live
- Website: Gospel1440.com

WMKM (1440 kHz) is a commercial AM radio station licensed to Inkster, Michigan, and serving the Detroit metropolitan area. Owned by Timothy Gallagher, through licensee Great Lakes Radio—Detroit, LLC, the station airs an Urban Gospel radio format branded as Gospel 1440 AM. The radio studios and offices are on East Grand Boulevard in Detroit.

WMKM broadcasts with 1,000 watts of power using two different directional signal patterns for day and night. Its six-tower array is located near Ecorse and Merriman Roads in Romulus, Michigan.

== History ==
From 1956 to 1990, the 1440 spot on the AM dial was the home of WCHB. It was the Detroit area's first radio station to be built from the ground up by, and programmed one hundred per cent to, African-Americans. WCHB played a soul music format through the 1960s and 70s. In the late 1970s, the station called itself "Detroit's original disco music station".

In February 1990, WCHB abandoned 1440 for the 1200 kHz frequency licensed to Taylor, Michigan, a more powerful signal. (That station today is WMUZ.) At that point, the station on 1440 AM took the call sign WMKM and began broadcasting brokered urban gospel and Christian programming aimed at the African-American community. Eventually the station added a few hours of brokered Spanish programming during the afternoon hours. The station's owner, Davidson Media Group, specialized in Gospel/Inspirational and Latino formats. In November 2005, the station's call letters temporarily changed to WRJD to match the new "Rejoice" slogan (Rejoice Detroit). The call sign switched back to WMKM, the following month, and then to WDRJ in April 2006.

In the summer of 2007, Davidson Media sold WDRJ to Communicom Corporation of America (CCA). CCA also owned WLNO New Orleans, and KXXT/KXEG in Phoenix, Arizona. WDRJ's gospel and Christian talk and teaching format did not change.

On October 6, 2014, the call letters returned to WMKM. At the same time, the station was sold by Communicom to Great Lakes Radio—Detroit, LLC.

== See also ==
- Media in Detroit
