= KHDZ-LP =

- Porterville, California; United States
- Frequency: 104.5 MHz

Ownership
- Owner: Iglesia del Pueblo

History
- First air date: February 12, 2014

Technical information
- Licensing authority: FCC
- Facility ID: 195137
- Class: L1
- ERP: 66 watts
- HAAT: 37 meters (121 ft)
- Transmitter coordinates: 36°03′15″N 119°11′42″W

Links
- Public license information: LMS

KHDZ-LP is a low power radio station broadcasting out of Porterville, California.

== History ==
KHDZ-LP went on the air on February 12, 2014.
