= XHXI-FM =

Radio station in Ixtapan de la Sal, State of Mexico

- Ixtapan de la Sal, State of Mexico; Mexico
- Frequency: 99.5 FM
- Branding: Lokura FM Grupera

Programming
- Format: Regional Mexican

Ownership
- Owner: Capital Media; (Radiodifusoras Capital, S.A. de C.V.)

History
- First air date: July 17, 1972 (concession); September 3, 2018 (FM)

Technical information
- Class: AA
- ERP: 6 kW
- HAAT: 385.3 m
- Transmitter coordinates: 18°53′53.81″N 99°43′45.42″W

Links
- Webcast: Listen live
- Website: lokurafm.com

XHXI-FM is a radio station on 99.5 FM in Ixtapan de la Sal, State of Mexico. XHXI-FM is owned by Capital Media and is known as Lokura FM Grupera with a Regional Mexican format.

== History ==
XEXI-AM, operating at 1400 kHz, received its concession on July 17, 1972. It operated with 250 watts and was owned by Ruben Marín y Kall. In 1978, Graciela Barrera y de la Garza purchased XEXI, and by the 1980s, its power was 1 kW. For many years, it was known as "La I de Ixtapan".

In 2015, the station was transferred to Capital Media.

On June 20, 2018, the IFT approved the migration of XEXI-AM to FM, under the 2008 AM-FM migration decree, as XHXI-FM on 99.5 MHz. XHXI signed on September 3, 2018.

On August 20, 2019, XHXI became "La Romántica", a romantic music format. On June 8, 2020, XHXI was one of seven stations to debut the new Lokura FM Spanish adult hits format. On the same day, the station left AM for good. Lokura FM was split into rock, adult hits, and Regional Mexican brands in 2023, with the Regional Mexican format being installed at XHXI.
