= WXYR-LP =

- Monticello, Kentucky; United States
- Frequency: 104.5 MHz

Ownership
- Owner: Genesis Appalachian Project, Inc.

Technical information
- Licensing authority: FCC
- Facility ID: 134825
- Class: L1
- ERP: 2 watts
- HAAT: 198.7 meters
- Transmitter coordinates: 36°48′29.00″N 84°50′46.00″W

Links
- Public license information: LMS

WXYR-LP (104.5 FM) is a radio station licensed to Monticello, Kentucky, United States. The station is currently owned by Genesis Appalachian Project, Inc.
