= XHFO-FM =

Radio Disney station in Mexico City

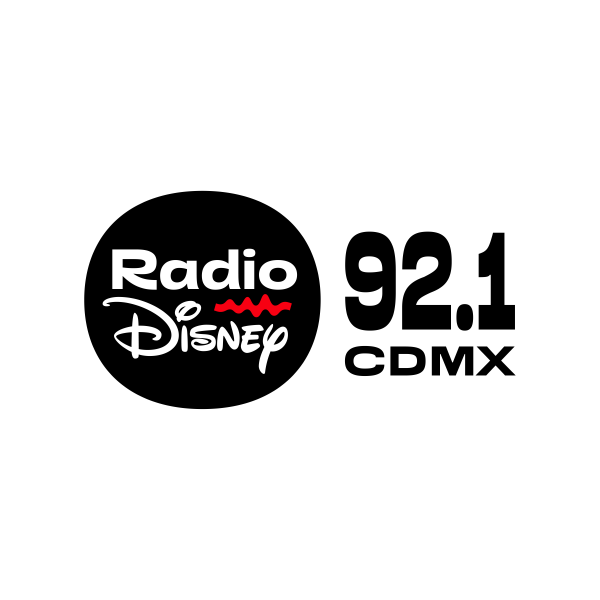
- Mexico City; Mexico
- Frequency: 92.1 MHz (HD Radio)

Programming
- Language: Spanish
- Format: Contemporary hit radio
- Network: Radio Disney

Ownership
- Owner: Grupo Siete Comunicación; (Grupo Radial Siete, S.A. de C.V.)
- Sister stations: XEEST-AM; XHCME-FM

History
- First air date: 1979

Technical information
- Licensing authority: CRT
- Class: C1
- ERP: 100 kW
- HAAT: 127.07 meters (416.9 ft)
- Transmitter coordinates: 19.3945°N 99.1744°W

Links
- Webcast: Listen live
- Website: mx.radiodisney.com; gruposiete.com.mx

XHFO-FM (92.1 FM, "Radio Disney") is a radio station in Mexico City. The station is owned by Grupo Siete and carries the Radio Disney pop format. The transmitter is located atop World Trade Center Mexico City building.

== History ==
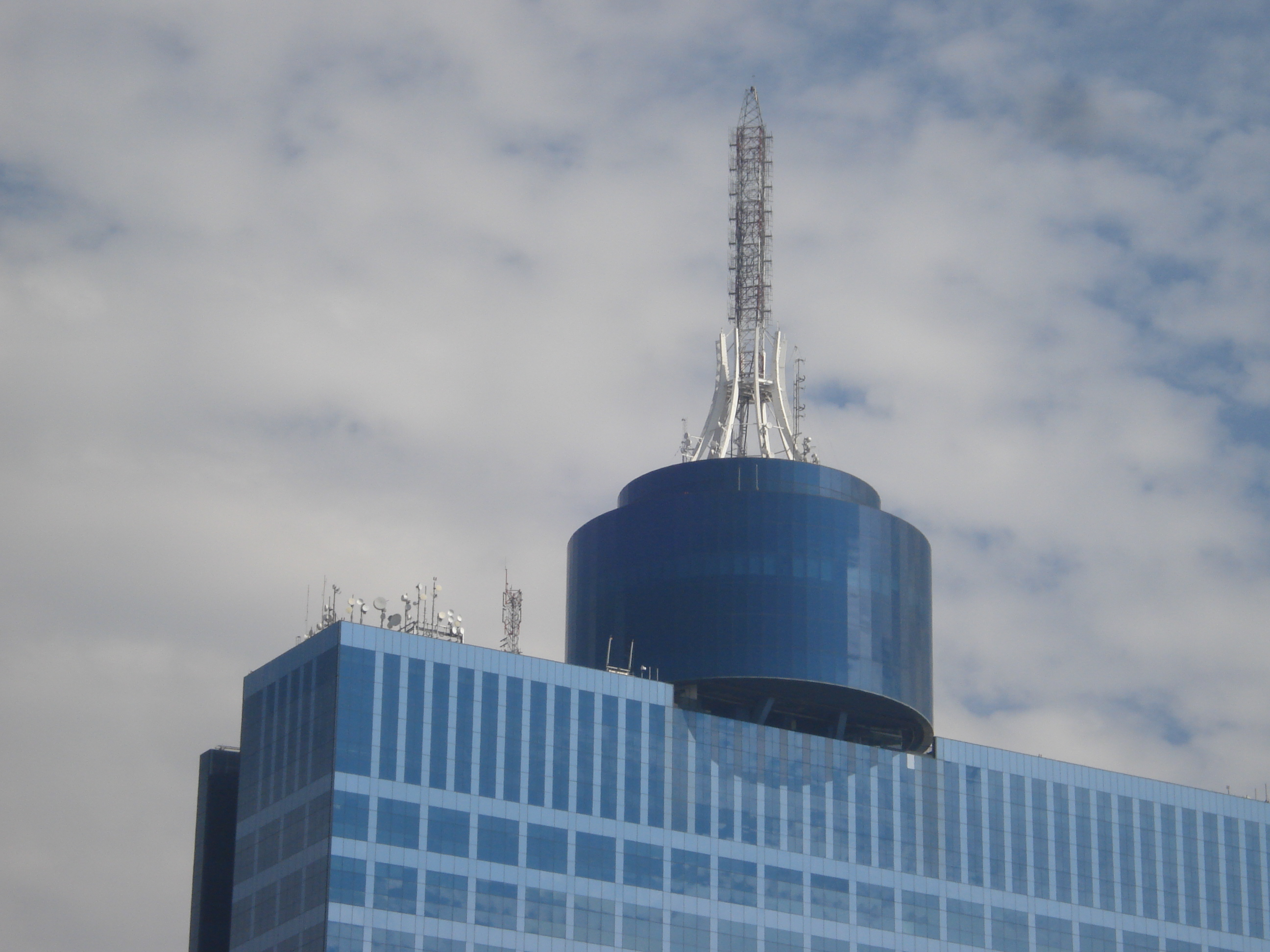
XHFO-FM transmits from the World Trade Center Mexico City on this tower

XHFO received its initial concession on November 26, 1964. It was owned by Raymundo Romero Damian.

XHFO signed on in 1979, as "Radio Triunfadora", being renamed to "Crystal FM" in 1982, with a contemporary Spanish music format. In 1993, as grupera music began to gain success, the station was lent to Grupo Radio Centro in exchange for XEEST-AM in a relationship that would last 26 years. GRC promptly changed the name and format of XHFO to "Sonido Z" with grupera and regional Mexican music. In 1996, it was renamed "La Z".

On December 7, 1998, a format swap occurred between XHFO and XEQR-FM, with XHFO adopting the English classic hits format "Universal Stereo" that had begun in 1974, whereas "La Z" moved to XEQR. The swap was due to both formats being in close proximity to competitor stations with almost the same formats (XEQ-FM and XHDFM-FM), as well as to keep XHFO's operation in GRC's hands, since Grupo Siete tried to reclaim it after "La Z" had become Mexico City's top-rated station.

On May 16, 2016, XHFO and XHRED 88.1 swapped formats. This time, the swap was due to technical considerations involving GRC's contract to operate XHFO, in order to preserve the continuity of the more profitable "Universal" format. Later that year, GRC and Grupo Siete extended the XHFO operating contract through November 30, 2020.

After a reorganization of GRC's AM stations in 2017, most talk programs from XERED-AM moved to XHFO, limiting music to overnight hours. Following yet another programming change on November 20, said programming was dropped entirely.

On January 14, 2019, XERC-FM flipped to talk as Radio Centro 97.7, taking with it most Radio Red programs and its format. XHFO became the pop station that XERC-FM had previously been, retaining the Red FM name and logo.

=== End of Grupo Radio Centro operation and relaunch as XFM ===
On June 25, 2019, GRC and Grupo Siete jointly announced the end of the former's agreement to operate the station, effective July 31. The new station, known as XFM 92.1, carried the Central FM newscast hosted by Pedro Ferriz de Con in mornings and other news programs, as well as an English-language classic hits format aimed at Generation X listeners.

=== Shutdown of XFM and relaunch as Radio Disney ===
On January 31, 2020, saw an abrupt and unexpected end to XFM, which played out in phases. That morning, Grupo Siete announced that because of a "failure to fulfill contractual obligations", Central FM news, provided by Central FM Equilibrio, S.A. de C.V., would no longer be heard on XFM as of February 1. By the end of the day, the company had also announced that XFM would itself give way to a new format to be announced. At midnight on February 1, the station flipped to an unbranded Top 40 CHR format, however, XFM remained temporarily available as an online stream. On February 17, XHFO began to identify itself as Radio Disney with a "coming soon" message, a format that had previously aired on XHPOP-FM from Grupo ACIR, which was replaced by Match FM in January 2020, following Disney's breaking up ties with ACIR in 2019. The format formally began on March 30.
