= WASP-LP =

- Huntington, West Virginia; United States
- Broadcast area: Huntington, West Virginia; Kenova, West Virginia; Burlington, Ohio
- Frequency: 104.5 MHz
- Branding: Super Station 104.5

Programming
- Format: EDM, '90s
- Affiliations: Spring Valley Timberwolves

Ownership
- Owner: Wayne County Board of Education; (Spring Valley High School (Students))
- Sister stations: WFGH-FM, WVWP-LP, WHJC, WVVP-FM

History
- First air date: January 14, 2016

Technical information
- Licensing authority: FCC
- Facility ID: 194654
- Class: L1
- ERP: 5 watts
- HAAT: 119.2 meters (391 ft)
- Transmitter coordinates: 38°22′38.00″N 82°30′56.80″W

Links
- Public license information: LMS
- Webcast: Listen live
- Website: superstationwv.com

WASP-LP is a campus variety-formatted broadcast radio station licensed to Huntington, West Virginia, and serving Huntington and Kenova in West Virginia and Burlington, Ohio. WASP-LP is owned and operated by Wayne County Board of Education.

Programming includes The Weekend Throwdown with Jagger, Remix Top30 with Hollywood Hamilton, and M.G. Kelly's Amazing 80s
