= WMVB =

- Millville, New Jersey; United States
- Frequency: 1440 kHz
- Branding: La Brava 96.1

Programming
- Format: Regional Mexican

Ownership
- Owner: Efrain Muniz-Campos

History
- First air date: 1953
- Former call signs: WMLV (1953–1958); WMVB (1958–1980); WREY (1980–1999)
- Call sign meaning: Millville, Vineland, Bridgeton

Technical information
- Licensing authority: FCC
- Facility ID: 56183
- Class: D
- Power: 460 watts day; 46 watts night
- Transmitter coordinates: 39°25′18.4″N 75°1′13.6″W
- Translator: 96.1 W241CS (Millville)

Links
- Public license information: Public file; LMS
- Webcast: Listen live
- Website: labrava961440.com

WMVB (1440 AM) is a radio station broadcasting a Regional Mexican format. Licensed to Millville, New Jersey, United States, the station is owned by Efrain Muniz-Campos and features Hispanic programming.

The station is a mostly local operation; the only syndicated program heard on the station was Jim Bohannon's America in the Morning news magazine. Local news and information was featured prominently on the station, including local talk, farm reports, religious programming, locally originated brokered programming, and a selection of niche music programs on weekends.

WMVB was formerly owned and operated by Richard Arsenault and Anita Arsenault between 1994 and 2000.

From 1980 to 1999, WMVB utilized the call letters WREY "Radio REY" and broadcast primarily Spanish language programming. WMVB originally signed on in 1953 as WMLV and shortly thereafter adopted the current WMVB callsign, which are believed to represent Millville, Vineland, and Bridgeton, the three largest cities in Cumberland County, New Jersey.
