= WJBS =

- Holly Hill, South Carolina; United States
- Frequency: 1440 kHz

Programming
- Format: Gospel

Ownership
- Owner: Harry J Govan

Technical information
- Licensing authority: FCC
- Facility ID: 19826
- Class: D
- Power: 1,000 watts day
- Transmitter coordinates: 33°20′23″N 80°26′18″W

Links
- Public license information: Public file; LMS
- Website: truthradiowjbs1440.com

WJBS (1440 AM) is a daytime only radio station broadcasting a Gospel format. Licensed to Holly Hill, South Carolina, United States, the station is owned by Harry J Govan, who purchased the station in 2007 after being the station manager for several years.
