= WPDC =

- Elizabethtown, Pennsylvania; United States
- Broadcast area: Harrisburg-York-Lancaster
- Frequency: 1600 kHz
- Branding: Sweet 16 WPDC

Programming
- Format: Oldies
- Affiliations: SRN News

Ownership
- Owner: JVJ Communications, Inc.

History
- First air date: May 23, 1958
- Former call signs: WEZN (1957–1964); WHRY (1964–1969); WEPN (1969–1971)

Technical information
- Licensing authority: FCC
- Facility ID: 32974
- Class: D
- Power: 1,000 watts (day); 7 watts (night)
- Transmitter coordinates: 40°9′45.34″N 76°34′34.9″W
- Translator: See § Translator

Links
- Public license information: Public file; LMS
- Webcast: Listen live
- Website: sweet16wpdc.com

WPDC (1600 kHz, "Sweet 16 WPDC") is a commercial AM radio station licensed to serve Elizabethtown, Pennsylvania. The station is owned by JVJ Communications, Inc. and airs an oldies radio format. The studios and offices are on Dairy Lane in Elizabethtown.

WPDC is powered at 1,000 watts by day using a non-directional antenna. At night, to avoid interfering with other radio stations on AM 1600, WPDC reduces power to 7 watts. Listeners can hear the station on an FM translator on 102.1 MHz.

== History ==
On March 15, 1955, Colonial Broadcasting Company applied to the Federal Communications Commission (FCC) for a construction permit for a new 500-watt daytime-only AM station on 1600 kHz in Elizabethtown, Pennsylvania. The FCC granted the permit on August 1, 1957, by which time the station had been assigned the WEZN call sign. On May 23, 1958, WEZN signed on the air.

The station went through many changes in ownership from the early 1960s to the mid-1980s. On August 1, 1961, the FCC granted a voluntary reassignment of the station's license to WEZN, Inc. The sale consummated on August 9, 1961. The FCC granted another voluntary reassignment of the license to Hershey Broadcasting Company, Inc. on November 4, 1963. The sale consummated on November 13, 1963. Following the sale, the call sign was changed to WHRY effective January 6, 1964.

On March 13, 1969, the FCC granted a voluntary reassignment of the station's license to East Penn Broadcasting Corporation. The sale consummated on March 27, 1969. Following the sale, the call sign was changed to WEPN effective July 1, 1969.

On September 22, 1970, the FCC granted a voluntary reassignment of the station's license to Smith Communications, Inc. Following the sale, the call sign was changed to WPDC effective February 1, 1971.

On November 19, 1979, the FCC granted a voluntary reassignment of the station's license to Eastern Broadcasting Corporation. The sale consummated on January 3, 1980. This sale was followed by another voluntary reassignment of the license to Penn Broadcasting Corporation on February 25, 1980. The sale consummated on March 1, 1980.

On September 20, 1984, the FCC granted a voluntary reassignment of the station's license to JVJ Communications, Inc. The sale consummated on December 7, 1984.

On March 3, 2006, the FCC granted the station a construction permit to change the location of the studio and transmitter and to change to 24-hour operation with a daytime power of 1,000 watts and a nighttime power of 18 watts. The FCC granted the station a new license with the new facilities on March 26, 2009.

On September 18, 2014, JVJ Communications, Inc. filed a "Notification of Suspension of Operations / Request for Silent STA" form with the FCC to take the station silent. The reason given was that "[t]he station has run out of money and cannot afford to broadcast at this time." The FCC granted the request on October 15, 2014. The station resumed broadcasting when JVJ Communications, Inc. filed a "Resumption of Operations" form with the FCC on December 17, 2014, stating that "[t]he station is operating pursuant to its license."

On December 4, 2017, JVJ Communications, Inc. applied to the FCC for a construction permit to build an FM translator. The FCC granted the permit on January 12, 2018. The permit specifies that the translator's facilities would include a new tower at the WPDC transmitter site. As a result, on November 13, 2018, JVJ Communications, Inc. applied to the FCC for a construction permit for WPDC, which was granted on January 3, 2019, to substitute the new tower for the currently used AM antenna tower, which would be decommissioned. The resulting required changes to the AM antenna would necessitate reducing the nighttime power from 18 watts to 7 watts. The FCC granted JVJ Communications, Inc. a license for the translator on December 13, 2018, followed by a new license for WPDC with the new facilities on March 11, 2020.

== Translator ==
WPDC programming is simulcast on the following translator:

Broadcast translator for WPDC
Call sign	Frequency	City of license	FID	ERP (W)	HAAT	Class	Transmitter coordinates	FCC info
W271DA	102.1 FM	Elizabethtown, Pennsylvania	201338	140	55 m (180 ft)	D	40°09′45.3″N 76°34′34.8″W	LMS
