= KZXQ =

- Reserve, New Mexico; United States
- Frequency: 104.5 MHz

Programming
- Format: Silent

Ownership
- Owner: Cochise Broadcasting LLC

History
- First air date: 2001

Technical information
- Licensing authority: FCC
- Facility ID: 78273
- Class: A
- ERP: 500 watts
- HAAT: −229 meters (−751 ft)
- Transmitter coordinates: 33°42′35″N 108°45′56″W

Links
- Public license information: Public file; LMS

KZXQ (104.5 FM) is a radio station licensed to Reserve, New Mexico, United States. The station is owned by Cochise Broadcasting LLC. The station has obtained a construction permit from the U.S. Federal Communications Commission (FCC) for a power increase to 820 watts.
