= KKMP =

Radio station in Garapan, Saipan, Northern Mariana Islands

- Garapan-Saipan, Northern Mariana Islands; United States
- Frequency: 1440 kHz

Ownership
- Owner: Blue Continent Communications Inc

Technical information
- Facility ID: 161101
- Class: B
- Power: 1,100 watts
- Transmitter coordinates: 15°9′28″N 145°43′5″E
- Translator: 92.1 K221EF (Garapan)

Links
- Webcast: Listen Live
- Website: CNMI Radio

KKMP (1440 AM) is a radio station licensed to Garapan-Saipan, Northern Mariana Islands, simulcasting an Island Music format from the CNMI. The station is currently owned by Blue Continent Communications Inc.
