= XHEDT-FM =

Radio station in Toluca, State of Mexico

- Toluca, State of Mexico; Mexico
- Frequency: 93.3 MHz
- Branding: Radio Crystal

Programming
- Format: Regional Mexican

Ownership
- Owner: Grupo Siete Comunicación; (Grupo Radial Siete, S.A. de C.V.)
- Sister stations: XHTOM-FM

History
- First air date: August 5, 1994 (concession)
- Call sign meaning: Estado de México/Toluca

Technical information
- ERP: 49,330 watts

Links
- Webcast: Listen live
- Website: radiocrystal.mx

XHEDT-FM is a radio station in Toluca, State of Mexico. Broadcasting on 93.3 FM, XHEDT is owned by Grupo Siete Comunicación and is known as Radio Crystal with a gold-based Regional Mexican format.

== History ==
Logo as Bengala, used until 2017

XHEDT received its concession on August 5, 1994. It was owned by Enrique Arturo González de Aragón Ortíz.

In 2017, XHEDT and XHMLO-FM in Tenancingo were the last Grupo Siete-owned stations to ditch the Bengala Regional Mexican format and were moved to Radio Crystal.
