= KCBW =

Radio station in Grandin–Poplar Bluff, Missouri

- Grandin, Missouri; United States
- Broadcast area: Poplar Bluff, Missouri; Doniphan, Missouri
- Frequency: 104.5 MHz
- Branding: The Rock

Programming
- Format: Classic rock

Ownership
- Owner: Fox Radio Network, LLC

History
- First air date: 2013

Technical information
- Licensing authority: FCC
- Facility ID: 170974
- Class: A
- ERP: 6,000 watts
- HAAT: 100 meters (330 ft)
- Transmitter coordinates: 36°48′15″N 90°43′12″W

Links
- Public license information: Public file; LMS
- Website: www.foxradionetwork.com/thequake-2

KCBW (104.5 FM) is a radio station licensed to Grandin, Missouri. The station broadcasts a classic rock format and is owned by Fox Radio Network, LLC.
