= KELG =

Radio station in Manor–Austin, Texas

Manor, Texas; United States
- Broadcast area: Austin metropolitan area
- Frequency: 1440 kHz
- Branding: KELG 1440AM

Programming
- Format: Spanish Christian

Ownership
- Owner: Encino Broadcasting; (Encino Broadcasting LLC)
- Sister stations: KOKE, KTXZ

History
- First air date: April 1, 1980
- Call sign meaning: K ELGin

Technical information
- Class: B
- Power: 800 watts day 500 watts night
- Transmitter coordinates: type:city 30°19′36.00″N 97°32′35.00″W

KELG is an Austin, Texas, radio station, licensed to Manor, Texas, and is owned by Encino Broadcasting.

== History ==
KELG signed on the air on April 1, 1980 as the sole radio station licensed to Elgin, Texas. The station was founded by a local group of Elgin, Texas business owners headed by Fred Lundgren. Lundgren also headed a group that moved KCAA (the one-time 1050 at Big Bear, California) to Loma Linda, California.

KELG was sold on March 4, 1982 to Longcrier Communications (Steven Longcrier).

In 1985, Longcrier sold KELG to Jose Jaime Garcia, Sr.

Garcia, Sr also founded KMXX 102.3 MHz in August 1976.

KELG 1440 kHz was the first AM full-time to service the Austin Hispanic community. Dynamic Radio Broadcasting Corporation would later add an FM radio station on August 14, 1992 KKLB 92.5 MHz – Elgin, Texas known as "Club 92.5FM". On September 1, 1994, it would acquire KTXZ 1560 kHz – Westlake Hills, Texas then known as "Austin's Original Tejano Music Station" and finally on March 29, 2000 it acquired KFON 1490 kHz – Austin, Texas then known as Sportsfan 1490”.

In 1997, KELG completed a major upgrade to increase power and to change the city of license from Elgin, Texas to Manor, Texas.

After nearly 20 years of operations, Dynamic Radio Broadcasting Corporation, owners of KKLB, KTXZ, KELG and KFON sold all four radio stations to Border Media Partners on January 3, 2005 for $19,000,000.

KELG was purchased by Encino Broadcasting LLC, along with KOKE, and KTXZ on September 24, 2007 for $5.5 million.
