= KUHL =

- Santa Maria, California; United States
- Broadcast area: Santa Maria-Lompoc, California
- Frequency: 1440 kHz

Ownership
- Owner: Carlos Zuriel Rojas

History
- First air date: January 17, 1947
- Former call signs: KCOY (1947–1969); KUHL (1969–2006); KINF (2006–2009)
- Former frequencies: 1400 kHz (1947–1960)

Technical information
- Licensing authority: FCC
- Facility ID: 24952
- Class: B
- Power: 5,000 watts (day); 1,000 watts (night)
- Transmitter coordinates: 34°59′1.9″N 120°27′13.6″W
- Translator: 106.3 K292HD (Los Alamos)

Links
- Public license information: Public file; LMS
- Webcast: Listen live (via TuneIn)
- Website: am1440.com

KUHL (1440 AM) is a silent commercial radio station licensed to Santa Maria, California, United States, and serves the Santa Maria—Lompoc, California area. The station is owned by Carlos Zuriel Rojas.

== History ==
The station first signed on January 17, 1947, as KCOY at the 1400 kHz frequency. It was launched by News-Press Publishing Company, owner of KTMS in Santa Barbara and the Santa Barbara News-Press. On April 5, 1955, KCOY was sold to Arenze Broadcasters, headed by James H. Ranger, for $34,000. It moved to 1440 kHz in 1960. In its early years, KCOY was a full service station, broadcasting a variety of news, sports, and rock music programming.

In April 1969, Ranger bought out his Arenze Broadcasters partners for $250,000, taking full ownership of KCOY. The station then changed its call letters to KUHL.

In 1986, Ranger sold KUHL and FM sister station KXFM in Santa Maria to Great Electric Communications Inc. for $2.25 million. On March 1, 1989, the transmitters for four stations in Santa Maria, including KUHL, were knocked off the air due to acts of vandalism. That evening, the towers fell as guy wires supporting the structures had been cut. Two males, ages 18 and 15, were suspected of inflicting the damage which was estimated to be $100,000. Great Electric sold KUHL and KXFM in 1991 to Roger Blaemire's Blackhawk Communications Inc. for $1.15 million.

On September 19, 2006, KUHL switched call signs to KINF. Three years later, on January 27, 2009, the station reverted to the KUHL call letters. On January 20, 2010, lightning struck the KUHL transmitter, knocking the station off the air temporarily. It was one of 11 stations in the Santa Maria area affected by storm-related power outages and equipment damage.

On May 15, 2024, station owner Sandy Knight announced that KUHL would shut down at the end of the month. The closure is concurrent with the sale of the other two Knight Broadcasting stations, KRAZ and KSYV, to third parties.

== Translator ==
Call sign	Frequency	City of license	FID	ERP (W)	Class	Transmitter coordinates	FCC info
K292HD	106.3 FM	Los Alamos, California	156143	125 vertical	D	34°41′27.9″N 120°16′1.5″W	LMS
