= WBVN =

- Carrier Mills, Illinois; United States
- Broadcast area: Marion-Carbondale (IL)
- Frequency: 104.5 MHz

Programming
- Format: Christian radio

Ownership
- Owner: Kenneth W. and Jane A. Anderson

Technical information
- Licensing authority: FCC
- Facility ID: 34015
- Class: A
- ERP: 6,000 watts
- HAAT: 100.0 meters (328.1 ft)
- Transmitter coordinates: 37°46′25.00″N 88°44′20.00″W

Links
- Public license information: Public file; LMS
- Website: Official website

WBVN (104.5 FM) is a radio station broadcasting a format consisting primarily of Christian contemporary music along with a few Christian talk and teaching programs. Licensed to Carrier Mills, Illinois, United States, the station serves the Marion-Carbondale (IL) area. The station is currently owned by Kenneth W. and Jane A. Anderson.
