= WXVI =

Montgomery, Alabama; United States
- Frequency: 1600 kHz

Programming
- Format: Gospel

Ownership
- Owner: New Life Ministries, Inc.

History
- First air date: May 28, 1947
- Former call signs: WAPX (1947–1976)
- Call sign meaning: "XVI" is the Roman numeral for 16, referring to the station's frequency

Technical information
- Licensing authority: FCC
- Facility ID: 63977
- Class: B
- Power: 5,000 watts (day); 1,000 watts (night)
- Transmitter coordinates: 32°23′40″N 86°17′21″W

Links
- Public license information: Public file; LMS
- Webcast: Listen live
- Website: http://www.nlcogic.org

WXVI (1600 AM) is a radio station broadcasting a gospel music format. Licensed to Montgomery, Alabama, United States, the station serves the greater Montgomery area. The station is owned by New Life Ministries, Inc.
