= KOKE (AM) =

Radio station in Texas, United States

- Pflugerville, Texas; United States
- Broadcast area: Austin-Round Rock metropolitan area
- Frequency: 1600 kHz
- Branding: Tejano 1600

Programming
- Format: Tejano

Ownership
- Owner: Encino Broadcasting; (Encino Broadcasting LLC)
- Sister stations: KELG, KTXZ

History
- First air date: June 16, 1985
- Former call signs: KVYK (1992–1995)

Technical information
- Licensing authority: FCC
- Facility ID: 54661
- Class: B
- Power: 5,000 watts day 700 watts night
- Transmitter coordinates: 30°20′44″N 97°32′46″W
- Translator: 1560 KTXZ (West Lake Hills)

Links
- Public license information: Public file; LMS

KOKE (1600 kHz) is an Austin, Texas AM radio station, licensed to Pflugerville, Texas, and is owned by Encino Broadcasting LLC. The station currently airs a Tejano format.

== Overview ==
KOKE was purchased by Encino Broadcasting LLC, along with KELG and KTXZ on September 24, 2007.

The station was originally licensed as KVYK until June 16, 1995 when the callsign was changed to KOKE.

From 2004 to 2007 the station was owned by Border Media Partners and served as a progressive talk radio station and Air America Radio affiliate.

After that it broadcast Regional Mexican for a few years, however by 2019 it had flipped to Tejano music replacing KTXZ 1560 which dropped the format.

== Personalities ==
- "Federico Castro"
- "Primo Pablo"
