= KUBA =

Coordinates: 39°06′21.6″N 121°39′21.9″W

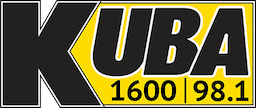
- Yuba City, California; United States
- Broadcast area: Marysville/Yuba City, California
- Frequency: 1600 kHz
- Branding: Yuba Sutter’s Classic Hits

Programming
- Format: Classic hits/News

Ownership
- Owner: Results Radio of Chico Licensee, LLC

History
- First air date: January 10, 1948
- Call sign meaning: K yUBA City

Technical information
- Licensing authority: FCC
- Facility ID: 56365
- Class: B
- Power: 5,000 watts day 2,500 watts night
- Translator: 98.1 K251CE (Yuba City)

Links
- Public license information: Public file; LMS
- Webcast: Listen live
- Website: kubaradio.com

KUBA (1600 AM) is a radio station based in Marysville, California. which serves the Marysville and Yuba City area, also known as the Yuba–Sutter area. KUBA is simulcast on translator K251CE 98.1 FM. Transmitting power is 5,000 watts day and 2,500 watts night.

KUBA is owned and operated by Results Radio of Chico Licensee, LLC. It offers a classic hits music format, along with extensive local news and sports coverage.

== Station history ==
KUBA was founded on January 24, 1947, and went on the air as an independent radio station on January 10, 1948. The Federal Communications Commission (FCC) granted a license to the station to start broadcasting at 500 watts of power on 1600 kilohertz. Power was raised to 1,000 watts in 1949 with the installation of a new 2-tower directional antenna system and the studio was moved to the Hotel Marysville in 1950. The power was once again increased, this time to 5,000 watts in February 1961. The station was once again relocated in 1963 to an office building on 4th Street in Marysville before moving to its permanent home at the transmitter site in Yuba City in the early 1970s.

In January 1983, KUBA was purchased by the Harlan Family and remained owners until the summer of 2004, when the station merged with Nevada County Broadcasters to increase coverage into the Nevada City, Grass Valley area. Nevada County Broadcasters sold KUBA in August 2010 to Results Radio of Chico Licensee, LLC.

== Format history ==
- 2003–Present Classic hits
- 1999-2002 Nostalgia
- 1976-1999 Country music
- 1957-1975 Top 40
- 1948-1955 Unknown

=== Both bands ===
From February 13, 2008 – August 10, 2011. KUBA was allowed to broadcast a simulcast of its programming on K238AV 95.5 FM. KUBA was one of the first AM radio stations in the country to qualify to add an FM signal under a new Federal Communications Commission ruling. As of 2011, KUBA transmits solely on 1600-AM.

In 2008, KUBA celebrated its 60th birthday. AM 1600 KUBA has gone through a few format changes from country music in 1999 to "America's Best Music" (a nostalgia format) to "Classic Hits of the 60's and 70's" plus news and information.

== Personalities ==
- Willie B (2016) Current KUBA morning drive personality. Previously, Willie B was on-air in Washington DC, San Diego, Indianapolis, New Orleans and Los Angeles.
- John Black (2000) KUBA morning drive personality until 2011.
- Steve Jackson (1971) Currently in Modesto (KJSN) and formerly in Sacramento.
- Rich Dixon (1971)- Morning drive personality. Dixon moved to KSAY Country, San Francisco and then to KGO Radio then to KJAX-1280 Stockton until 1996.
- Lon Simmons (early 1950s) Yuba College Play-By-Play. Simmons went to Fresno, then to the San Francisco Giants. Simmons also called SF 49er games and Oakland A's.

== Sports ==
- 2000–2016, 2019-2022 Marysville Gold Sox Baseball (Commentators: Geoff Flynn 2000-2016, Todd Kuhnen 2019- 2022)
- 1988-2009 Yuba City High School Football and Basketball
- 2004 San Francisco 49ers Football

== Previous logo ==
(KUBA's logo when they were simulcasting on 95.5 translator)
