= DWGL =

Philippine radio station

Radyo Natin Bayombong (DWGL)
Bayombong; Philippines
- Broadcast area: Northern Nueva Vizcaya
- Frequency: 104.5 MHz
- Branding: Radyo Natin 104.5

Programming
- Languages: Ilocano, Filipino
- Format: Community radio
- Network: Radyo Natin Network

Ownership
- Owner: MBC Media Group

History
- First air date: 2012

Technical information
- Licensing authority: NTC
- Power: 1,000 watts

DWGL (104.5 FM), broadcasting as Radyo Natin 104.5, is a radio station owned and operated by MBC Media Group. The station's studio and transmitter are located along Dumlao Blvd., Brgy. Don Domingo Maddela, Bayombong.
