= KJTX =

- Jefferson, Texas; United States
- Broadcast area: Longview-Marshall area
- Frequency: 104.5 MHz

Programming
- Format: Gospel

Ownership
- Owner: Wisdom Ministries, Inc.

Technical information
- Licensing authority: FCC
- Facility ID: 73065
- Class: A
- ERP: 4,400 watts
- HAAT: 111.0 meters (364.2 ft)
- Transmitter coordinates: 32°49′23″N 94°28′32″W

Links
- Public license information: Public file; LMS
- Website: kjtx1045fm.com

KJTX (104.5 FM) is a radio station broadcasting a Gospel music format. Licensed to Jefferson, Texas, United States, the station serves the Longview-Marshall area. The station is currently owned by Wisdom Ministries, Inc.
