= XHVAL-FM =

Radio station in Valle de Bravo, State of Mexico

Valle de Bravo, Mexico, Mexico; Mexico
- Frequency: 104.5 MHz
- Branding: Mexiquense Radio

Ownership
- Owner: Gobierno del Estado de México

History
- First air date: June 20, 2008
- Call sign meaning: VALle de Bravo

Technical information
- ERP: 3 kW

Links
- Website: sistemamexiquense.mx/radio

XHVAL-FM is a radio station in Valle de Bravo on 104.5 MHz, owned by the government of the State of Mexico. It is part of the Radio Mexiquense state radio network.

XHVAL was added in 2008 as part of an expansion of Radio Mexiquense with four new FM stations.
