= XHCME-FM =

Radio station in Coacalco–Melchor Ocampo, State of Mexico

- Melchor Ocampo, State of Mexico; Mexico
- Broadcast area: Coacalco
- Frequency: 103.7 FM
- Branding: Radio Crystal

Programming
- Format: Regional Mexican

Ownership
- Owner: Grupo Siete Comunicación; (Grupo Radial Siete, S.A. de C.V.)
- Sister stations: XHFO-FM, XEEST-AM

History
- First air date: August 5, 1994 (concession)
- Call sign meaning: Coacalco, Estado de MExico

Technical information
- ERP: 3,000 watts
- Transmitter coordinates: 19.63339°N 99.09648°W

Links
- Webcast: Listen live
- Website: radiocrystal.mx

XHCME-FM is a radio station in Melchor Ocampo, State of Mexico. Broadcasting on 103.7 FM, XHCME is owned by Grupo Siete and is known as Radio Crystal with an older-leaning Regional Mexican format.

== History ==
XHCME received its concession on August 5, 1994. It was owned by Carlos Rafael González Aragón Ortíz and originally to be located in Coacalco, where it maintains its studios. Grupo Siete operates XHCME as a rimshot into the Mexico City area.

On July 1, 2017, XHCME changed formats to Crystal, reviving a name used before by Grupo Siete stations including in Mexico City and Toluca.

== Gallery ==
Former logo for Bengala 103.7

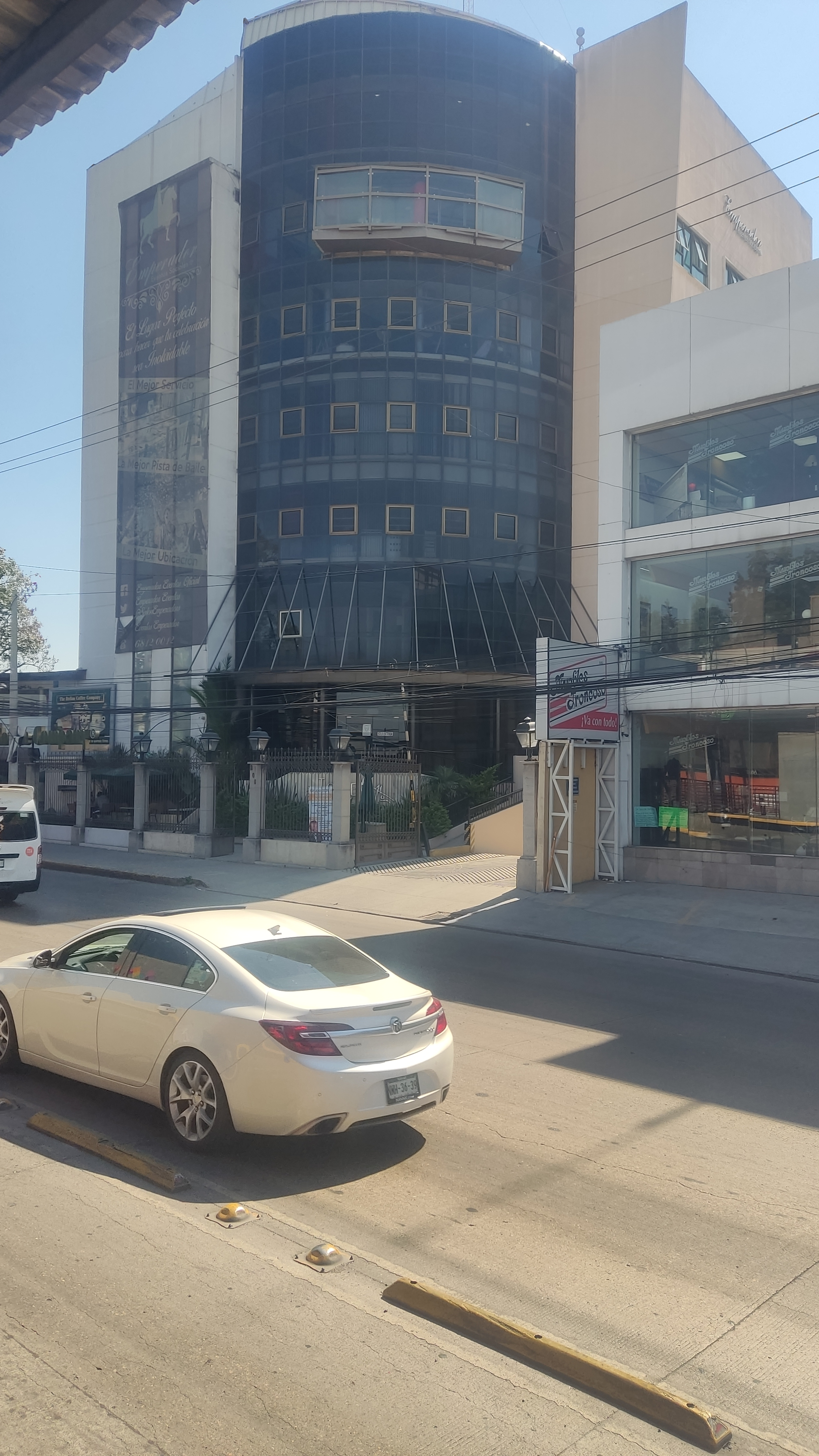
Crystal is broadcast from Torre Griscell in Coacalco.
