= XHZZZ-FM =

Radio station in Manzanillo, Colima

- Manzanillo, Colima; Mexico
- Frequency: 93.7 FM
- Branding: La Bestia Grupera

Programming
- Format: Regional Mexican

Ownership
- Owner: Grupo Radio Levy; (Radio Tesoro, S.A. de C.V.)
- Operator: Grupo Radiorama (Grupo Audiorama Comunicaciones)

History
- First air date: October 21, 1994 (concession)
- Former call signs: XHANZ-FM (never used)

Technical information
- Class: B1
- ERP: 15 kW

Links
- Website: www.radiorama.mx/aradios.php?id=338

XHZZZ-FM is a radio station in Manzanillo, Colima. It is owned by RadioLevy, but is originally operated by Grupo Audiorama and carries its Regional Mexican format known as La Bestia Grupera.

== History ==
XHANZ-FM received its concession on October 21, 1994, though it changed its call sign to XHZZZ-FM before 2000.

On June 21, 2019, RadioLevy announced that Grupo Radiorama would take over operation of its three radio stations on July 1, 2019. New Audiorama formats formally launched on the RadioLevy stations on July 15, with XHZZZ joining the La Bestia Grupera network.
