= XHEMAX-FM =

Radio station in Tecomán, Colima

- Tecomán, Colima; Mexico
- Frequency: 105.3 FM
- Branding: MAX 105.3

Programming
- Format: Spanish adult hits

Ownership
- Owner: Grupo Radio Levy; (Radio Armería, S.A.)
- Operator: Grupo Audiorama Comunicaciones
- Sister stations: XHECO-FM

History
- First air date: 1974
- Former call signs: XELS-AM, XEMAX-AM
- Call sign meaning: Station previously branded as Radio Max

Technical information
- Class: B1
- ERP: 12 kW
- Transmitter coordinates: 18°56′06″N 103°53′21″W

Links
- Website: www.audiorama.mx/estacion/max/tecoman/105.3FM

XHEMAX-FM is a radio station on 105.3 FM in Tecomán, Colima. The station is owned by Grupo Radio Levy and operated by Grupo Audiorama Comunicaciones, and carries a Spanish-language adult hits format known as MAX 105.3.

== History ==
XHEMAX began as XELS-AM 1360, with a concession awarded on August 9, 1974 to David Flores Padilla. In the 1990s, the station changed ownership, calls and frequency to 810.

In 2011, XEMAX migrated to FM on 106.1 MHz. As part of its 2017 concession renewal, XHEMAX-FM was moved again on March 10, 2018, this time to 105.3 MHz, in order to clear 106-108 MHz as much as possible for community and indigenous radio stations.

On June 21, 2019, RadioLevy announced that Grupo Audiorama Comunicaciones would take over operation of its three radio stations on July 1, 2019. However, XHEMAX retained its name as "Max 105.3".
