= XHECO-FM =

Radio station in Tecomán, Colima

- Tecomán, Colima; Mexico
- Frequency: 90.5 FM
- Branding: La Bestia Grupera

Programming
- Format: Regional Mexican
- Affiliations: Grupo Radiorama

Ownership
- Owner: Grupo Audiorama Comunicaciones; (XHECO-FM, S.A. de C.V.)
- Sister stations: XHEMAX-FM

History
- First air date: October 28, 1993 (concession)
- Call sign meaning: From Tecomán

Technical information
- Class: B
- ERP: 14.4 kW
- Transmitter coordinates: 19°06′09″N 103°52′10″W

Links
- Webcast: Listen live
- Website: radiorama.mx

XHECO-FM is a radio station on 90.5 FM in Tecomán, Colima. The station is owned by Grupo Audiorama Comunicationes and affiliated with Grupo Radiorama, and carries a Regional Mexican format known as La Bestia Grupera.

== History ==
XHECO received its concession on April 7, 1993; it was originally located on 88.9 MHz and owned by Héctor Manuel Vielma Valdivia and was later moved to 90.5 MHz. In 1998, it was sold to Limón, S.A. de C.V. and then to Grupo Radiorama in 2003.
