= XHTY-FM (Colima) =

Radio station in Tecomán, Colima, Mexico

- Tecomán, Colima; Mexico
- Frequency: 91.3 MHz
- Branding: La Más Picuda

Programming
- Format: Regional Mexican

Ownership
- Owner: Grupo Radiorama; (XETY-AM, S.A. de C.V.)
- Sister stations: XHEVE-FM

History
- First air date: October 17, 1962
- Former call signs: XETY-AM (1962–2023)
- Former frequencies: 1400 kHz (1962-1991), 1390 kHz (1991-2023)

Technical information
- Class: B1
- ERP: 10 kW

Links
- Webcast: Listen live
- Website: radioramacolima.com

XHTY-FM is a radio station on 91.3 FM in Tecomán, Colima. It is owned by Grupo Radiorama and carries a Regional Mexican format known as La Más Picuda.

== History ==
Logo used with the @Arroba FM format

XETY-AM formally signed on October 17, 1962. It was owned by Manuel Ayala Estrada, who also worked for Colima's XHCC-TV channel 5, and initially broadcast on 1400 kHz. It was sold to Delia Escamilla de Martínez in 1972. After its sale to Víctor Manuel Martínez Jiménez in 1991, it obtained an FM combo station in 1994.

The AM frequency was turned off on November 24, 2023.

Throughout its history, it has had names such as Los 40 Principales (from Radiópolis), Éxtasis Digital, Arroba FM, La Luperrona, and Xplosión. Its current name is La Más Picuda with a Regional Mexican format.
