= Weirsdale, Florida =

Town in Florida, U.S.

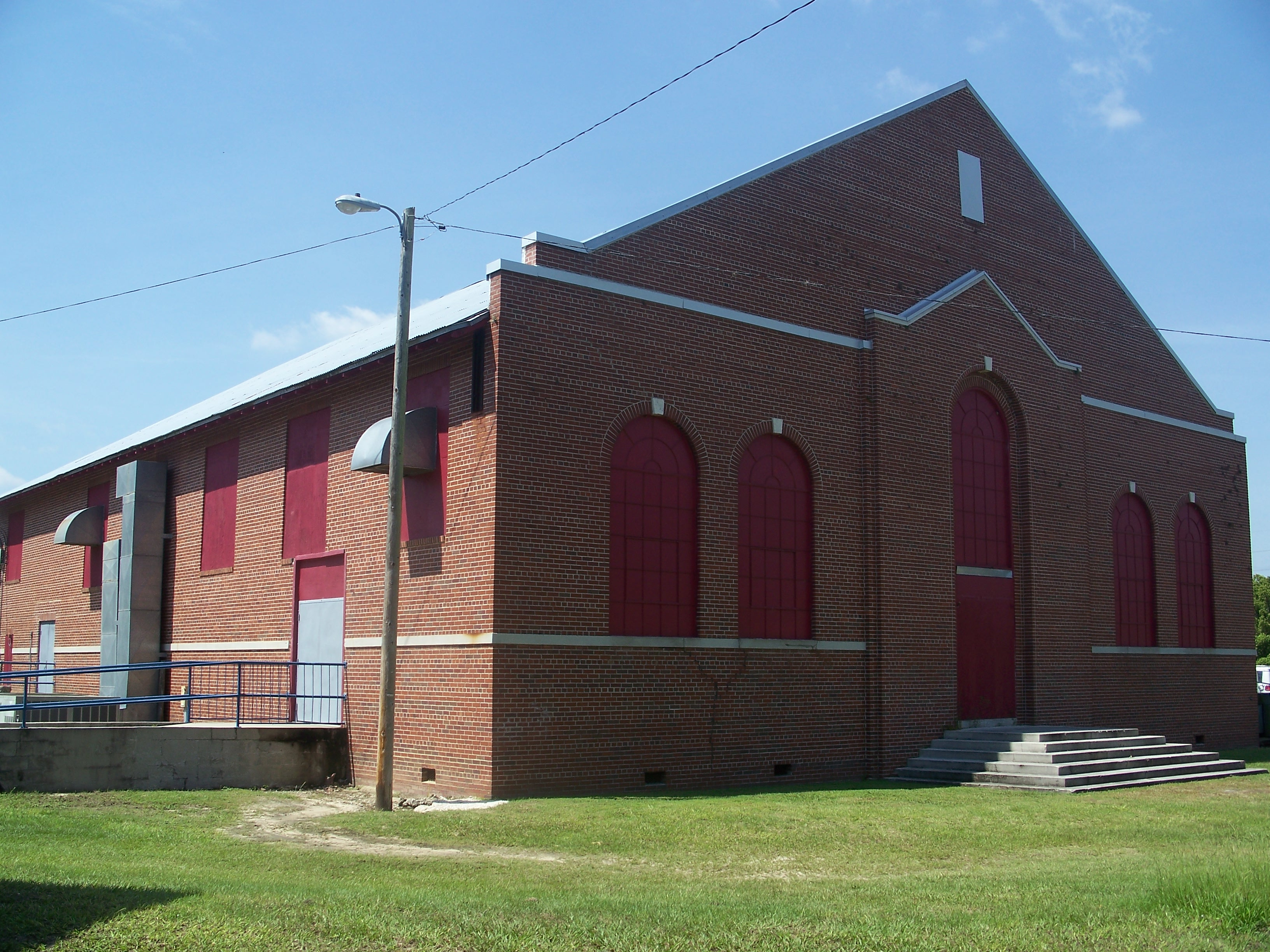
Former gymnasium for the local school, now a country music venue

Weirsdale is an unincorporated community in Marion County, Florida, United States. It is located near the intersection of State Road 25 and State Road 42. The community is part of the Ocala Metropolitan Statistical Area.

== History ==
A post office called Weirsdale has been in operation since 1892. Weirsdale has historically been centered on the citrus packing industry.

== Geography ==
Weirsdale is located at 28°58′54″N 81°55′28″W (28.9817, -81.9244).
