= Mexiquense Televisión =

Public TV network of the State of Mexico

Coordinates: 19°35′32.20″N 99°06′56.40″W

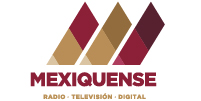

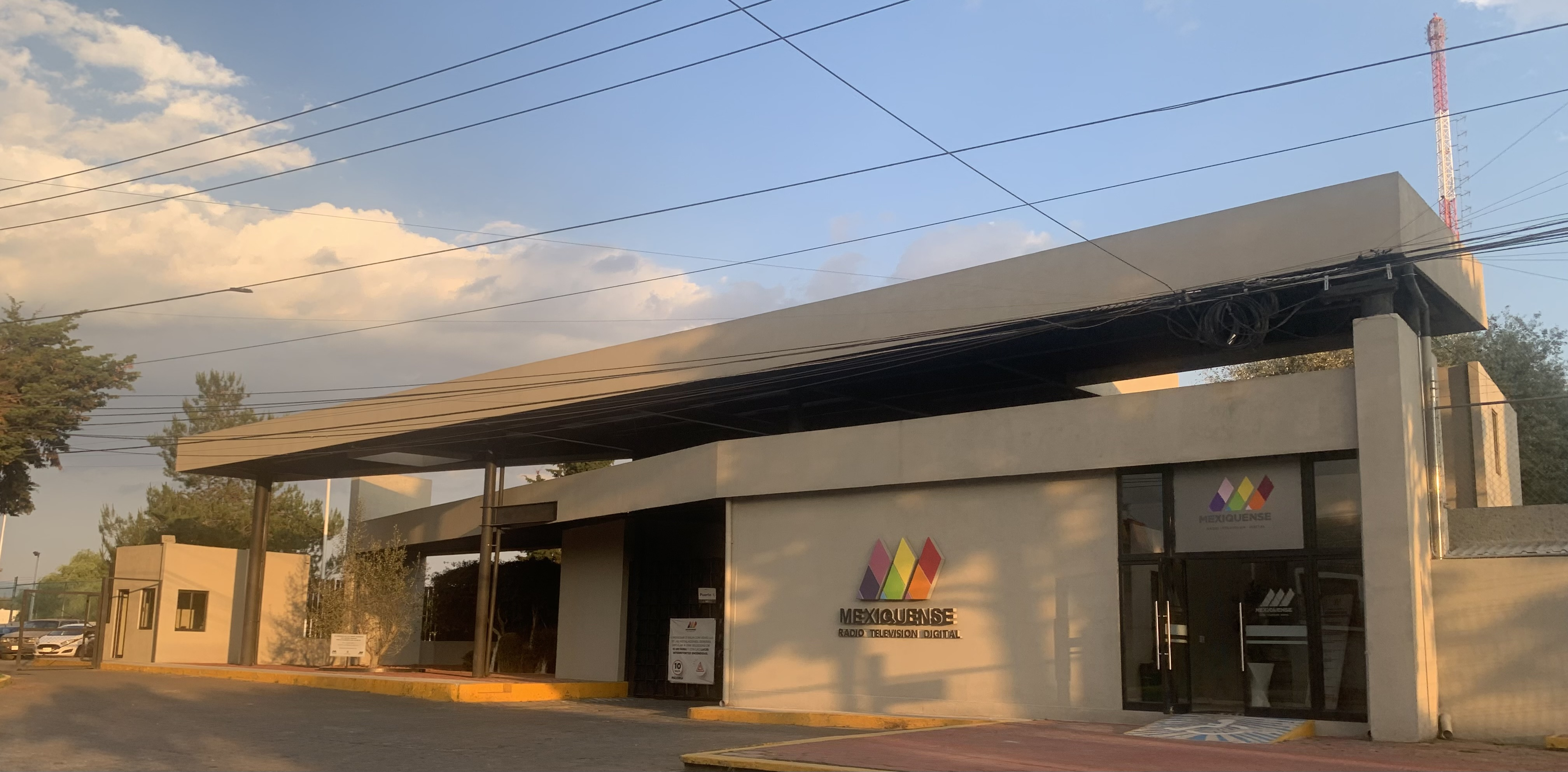
- Type: Terrestrial television network
- Country: Mexico
- Broadcast area: State of Mexico and Mexico City; Nationwide (via cable and satellite)

Programming
- Language: Spanish
- Picture format: HDTV 1080i

Ownership
- Owner: Sistema Mexiquense de Medios Públicos (Gobierno del Estado de México)

History
- Launched: September 26, 1984; 41 years ago

Links
- Website: sistemamexiquense.mx

Availability

Terrestrial
- Digital terrestrial television (Mexico): Channel 34

Mexiquense Televisión is the public television network of the Mexican State of Mexico. It is operated by the Sistema Mexiquense de Medios Públicos, previously Sistema de Radio y Televisión Mexiquense, a state agency which also owns six radio stations. It consists of two high-powered television transmitters covering the valleys of Toluca and Mexico, supplemented by 28 retransmitters.

== History ==
A little more than a year after the initial sign-on of the first radio station, on 10 July 1984 the Televisión Mexiquense broadcasting system was deployed using the following transmitters: XHGEM-TV channel 7 in Metepec, serving Toluca (relocated to channel 12 in 1988 after channel 7 Mexico City signed on); XHTEJ-TV channel 12 in Tejupilco; and XHATL-TV channel 4 in Atlacomulco. Atlacomulco went off the air at some point, and Tejupilco's permit was not renewed and a retransmitter set up there upon the state network's conversion to digital.

In 1998, responsibility for Televisión Mexiquense was transferred to the newly formed Sistema de Radio y Televisión Mexiquense, part of the Secretariat of Education, Culture and Social Welfare of the state of Mexico.

In 1999, coverage was extended to the east of the Mexican capital, covering the Cuautitlán-Texcoco Valley and the Federal District, by means of XHPTP-TV channel 34 and a broadcast tower atop Three Padres Peak in the municipality of Coacalco.

Due largely to expansion in coverage of the network, on 11 November 1999, the responsibility for the Sistema de Radio y Televisión Mexiquense was moved away from the Secretariat of Education, Culture and Social Welfare to become the direct responsibility of the Government of the State of Mexico. Some drastic changes in the programming content followed, departing largely from coverage of very local subjects that previously had occupied most of the broadcast schedule.

After the year 2000, Televisión Mexiquense began expansion of its signal to other parts of the Republic and internationally, taking advantage of new technologies and the growing popularity of subscription television. In 2001, the Sky System and the Solidaridad (Solidarity) II satellite extended its signal nationwide. Coverage was extended to Cablevisión subscribers in November 2003.

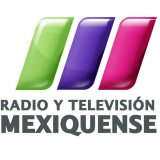
Former logo from 2011 until 2020

In 2004, with the obsolescence of the Solidaridad II satellite, Televisión Mexiquense migrated to a new Mexican government-owned satellite, Satmex 5. Its network coverage area now extended outside Mexican national territory, reaching the United States, southern Canada, the Caribbean, Central America and most of South America.

On 25 June 2004, the Televisión Mexiquense signal was carried live for the first time via Internet streaming video.

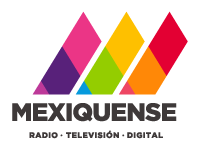
Former logo from 2020 until 2023.

In March 2016, the two remaining high-power transmitters were authorized to clear the 600 MHz band by moving to lower channels. XHGEM moved to RF channel 20, while XHPTP relocated its digital facilities to its former analog channel 34.

== Transmitters ==
RF	VC	Call sign	Location	ERP
20	34	XHGEM-TDT	Toluca/Jocotitlán	250 kW
34	34	XHPTP-TDT	Pico Tres Padres	400 kW

XHGEM has authorizations for 21 digital repeaters across the state, including repeaters that replace the old, separately licensed Tejupilco de Hidalgo and Atlacomulco ones. Seven more are associated to XHPTP.

The entire state network left analog on 17 December 2015, in line with the shutoff date for television in Mexico City and the State of Mexico.

XHGEM and its dependent repeaters changed from virtual channel 12 to 34 in October 2016, to standardize with XHPTP.

== Programming ==
Most of Televisión Mexiquense's programming is produced in-house, with three newscasts a day, a daily sports program and public affairs and cultural programming. What syndicated fare it has had over the years has almost exclusively consisted of movies, foreign soap operas (mostly Korean dramas dubbed into Spanish) and cartoons. The network also sources some of its programming from Deutsche Welle's Spanish-language service, which also sells its output to other state networks.

=== Subchannels ===
On 26 September 2019, Governor Alfredo del Mazo announced that Mexiquense TV would launch two subchannels and a news agency, AMX Noticias. The subchannels, an AMX Noticias news channel and 1-hour timeshift of the same, were authorized by the IFT the same month and slated to launch in early 2020. The 34.2 subchannel launched in April 2020 to carry school programming after all in-person classes were halted.
