= XETUL-AM =

Radio station in Tultitlán, State of Mexico

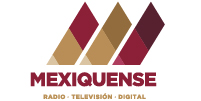
- Tultitlán, Mexico; Mexico
- Broadcast area: Greater Mexico City
- Frequency: 1080 kHz
- Branding: Mexiquense Radio

Ownership
- Owner: Gobierno del Estado de México
- Sister stations: Mexiquense Televisión

History
- First air date: May 16, 1983
- Call sign meaning: TULtitlán

Technical information
- Licensing authority: CRT
- Class: B
- Power: 5 kW day.25 kW night
- Transmitter coordinates: 19°40′48.9″N 99°06′11.2″W

Links
- Website: sistemamexiquense.mx/radio

XETUL-AM is a radio station in Tultitlán on 1080 kHz, owned by the government of the State of Mexico. It is the only radio transmitter in the Radio y Televisión Mexiquense system aimed at the Mexico City area. Most programming originates from the main stations in Metepec.

XETUL broadcasts with 5,000 watts daytime and 250 watts nighttime on the AM frequency of 1080 kHz.
