= List of radio stations in Michoacán =

This is a list of radio stations in the Mexican state of Michoacán, which can be sorted by their call signs, frequencies, location, ownership, names, and programming formats.

Radio stations in Michoacán
Call sign	Frequency	Location	Owner	Name	Format
XELQ-AM (Note: Linked to XHLQ-FM, which must keep XELQ-AM on the air until there are no listeners in its service area unserved by other radio stations or the IFT orders it to cease to make way for a new station.)	570 AM	Morelia	Laris Hermanos, S.A.	Candela	Regional Mexican
XECSAY-AM (Note: Will replace XELQ-AM if built.)	570 AM	Morelia	Michael Jonathan Alvarado Cuéllar	—N/a	—N/a
XEUF-AM (Note: Combo with XHUF-FM 100.5)	610 AM	Uruapan	XEUF, S.A.	StereoMía	
XELX-AM (Note: Linked to XHLX-FM, which must keep XELX-AM on the air until there are no listeners in its service area unserved by other radio stations or the IFT orders it to cease to make way for a new station.)	700 AM	Zitácuaro	Radio Zitácuaro, S.A.	La Mejor	Regional Mexican
XEKN-AM (Note: Linked to XHKN-FM, which must keep XEKN-AM on the air until there are no listeners in its service area unserved by other radio stations or the IFT orders it to cease to make way for a new station.)	720 AM	Huetamo de Nuñez	Grupo Tredi Comunicaciones, S.A. de C.V.	La Z	Regional Mexican
XEUORN-AM	750 AM	Uruapan	Media FM, S.A. de C.V.	—N/a	—N/a
XEML-AM (Note: Linked to XHEML-FM, which must keep XEML-AM on the air until there are no listeners in its service area unserved by other radio stations or the IFT orders it to cease to make way for a new station.)	770 AM	Apatzingán	XEML, S.A.	La Ranchera de Apatzingán	Regional Mexican
XEPUR-AM	830 AM	Cheran	Instituto Nacional de Los Pueblos Indígenas	La Voz de los Purépechas	Indigenous radio
XELCM-AM (Note: Linked to XHLCM-FM, which must keep XELCM-AM on the air until there are no listeners in its service area unserved by other radio stations or the IFT orders it to cease to make way for a new station.)	920 AM	Lázaro Cardenas	XELCM-AM, S.A. de C.V.	La Poderosa	Regional Mexican
XELC-AM (Note: Combo with XHLC-FM 92.7)	980 AM	La Piedad	980 Dual Estéreo, S.A. de C.V.	Radio Pía	Regional Mexican
XEGQ-AM (Note: Linked to XHGQ-FM, which must keep XEGQ-AM on the air until there are no listeners in its service area unserved by other radio stations or the IFT orders it to cease to make way for a new station.)	1000 AM	Los Reyes de Salgado	Tremor Comunicaciones, S.A. de C.V.	La Raza	Regional Mexican
XETUX-AM	1010 AM	Tuxpan de Las Flores	Instituto Nacional de Los Pueblos Indígenas	La Voz de la Sierra Oriente	Indigenous radio
XEIP-AM (Note: Combo with XHIP-FM 89.7)	1050 AM	Uruapan	XEIP-AM, S.A. de C.V.	La Poderosa	Regional Mexican
XEFN-AM (Note: Combo with XHFN-FM 91.1)	1130 AM	Uruapan	XEFN, S.A.	Candela	Regional Mexican
XEMEFM-AM	1240 AM	Morelia	Media FM, S.A. de C.V.	—N/a	—N/a
XEIX-AM	1290 AM	Jiquilpan de Juárez	XEIX, S.A.	Super Éxitos	
XECR-AM (Note: Combo with XHCR-FM 96.3)	1340 AM	Morelia	Radio Tremor Morelia, S.A. de C.V.	La Z	Regional Mexican
XEREL-AM	1550 AM	Morelia	Gobierno del Estado de Michoacán	SM Radio	Public radio
XECSIA-AM	1620 AM	Pátzcuaro	Comunidad Indígena de Ajuno, Michoacán	—N/a	—N/a
XESCAH-AM	1630 AM	Tarímbaro	FH Comunicadores de Michoacán, A.C.	—N/a	—N/a
XECSIB-AM	1640 AM	Zamora de Hidalgo	Comunidad Indígena de Tarecuato	—N/a	—N/a
XECSIC-AM	1680 AM	Morelia	Comunidad Indígena de Acachuen	—N/a	—N/a
XHZN-FM	88.1 FM	Zamora	Radio Ga Ga, S.A. de C.V.	Los 40	Contemporary hit radio
XHDCP-FM	88.3 FM	Ario de Rosales	De Corazón Purépecha, A.C.	Expresión Radio	Community radio
XHPVAT-FM	88.3 FM	Maravatío	Mr Pool Music, S.A. de C.V.	Radio Sensitiva	Regional Mexican
XHREL-FM	88.5 FM	Morelia	Gobierno del Estado de Michoacán	SM Radio	Public radio
XHCCBF-FM	88.5 FM	Sahuayo de Morelos	TV Rey de Occidente, S.A. de C.V.	La Poderosa	Regional Mexican
XHDAD-FM	88.7 FM	La Piedad	Gobierno del Estado de Michoacán	SM Radio	Public radio
XHPQGA-FM	88.9 FM	Quiroga	Grupo La Voz del Viento, S.A. de C.V.	Ke Buena	Regional Mexican
XHCEA-FM	89.1 FM	Los Reyes de Salgado	Colectivo Expresión Alternativa, A.C.	Expresión Alternativa	Community radio
XHZTM-FM	89.1 FM	Zitacuaro	Alfonso Ibarra Valdés	Fantasía	Variety
XHKW-FM	89.3 FM	Morelia	Corporación Morelia Multimedia, S.A. de C.V.	Exa FM	Contemporary hit radio
XHIP-FM	89.7 FM	Uruapan	XEIP-AM, S.A. de C.V.	La Poderosa	Regional Mexican
XHLP-FM	89.9 FM	La Piedad	XELP-AM, S.A. de C.V.	Yeah FM	Pop
XHLQ-FM	90.1 FM	Morelia	Laris Hermanos, S.A.	Candela	Regional Mexican
XHSCEL-FM	90.1 FM	Peribán	Voces del Pueblo de Peribán, A.C.	Voces del Campo de Peribán	Community radio
XHSCEE-FM	90.5 FM	Purépero de Echáiz	Purépero de Mis Amores, A.C.	Inolvidable	Spanish oldies
XHSIBS-FM	90.7 FM	Huecorio	Uekorheni, A.C.	Radio Uekorheni	Community radio
XHCSJI-FM	90.9 FM	Buenavista Tomatlán	Jorge Medina Guizar	La Grande	Variety
XHFN-FM	91.1 FM	Uruapan	XEFN, S.A.	Candela	Regional Mexican
XHMRL-FM	91.5 FM	Morelia	José Humberto y Loucille Martínez Morales	91.5 FM	Contemporary hit radio
XHCCBD-FM	91.7 FM	Ciudad Lázaro Cárdenas	TV Rey de Occidente, S.A. de C.V.	Oreja FM	Pop
XHQL-FM	91.7 FM	Zamora	Radiodifusora del Valle de Zamora, S.A.	Catedral de la Música	Regional Mexican
XHCCBC-FM	91.9 FM	Ciudad Hidalgo	Mr Pool Music, S.A. de C.V.	Ke Buena	Regional Mexican
XHSCEF-FM	91.9 FM	Santa Clara del Cobre	Radio Santa Clara, A.C.	Radio Santa Clara, La Más Perrona	Community radio
XHAZN-FM	92.1 FM	Apatzingán	Arturo Herrera Cornejo	La Pura Ley	Regional Mexican
XHLY-FM	92.3 FM	Morelia	LY, S.A.	Infinito	Contemporary hit radio
XHGQ-FM	92.5 FM	Los Reyes de Salgado	Tremor Comunicaciones, S.A. de C.V.	La Raza	Regional Mexican
XHPHGO-FM	92.7 FM	Ciudad Hidalgo	Media FM, S.A. de C.V.	Media News Radio	News/talk
XHLC-FM	92.7 FM	La Piedad	980 Dual Estéreo, S.A. de C.V.	Radio Pía	Regional Mexican
XHPQUI-FM	92.7 FM	Quiroga	Media FM, S.A. de C.V.	Media News Radio	News/talk
XHLIA-FM	93.1 FM	Morelia	Carlos de Jesus Quiñones Armendariz	Grupera 93.1	Regional Mexican
XHPNVA-FM	93.3 FM	Nueva Italia	Miguel Ángel Escobedo Villafaña	Turbo FM	Regional Mexican
XHENI-FM	93.7 FM	Tejerias	Radio Uruapan, S.A. de C.V.	Los 40	Contemporary hit radio
XHLZ-FM	93.9 FM	Lázaro Cárdenas	Stereo 94 de Michoacán, S.A. de C.V.	La Pura Ley	Regional Mexican
XHMO-FM	93.9 FM	Morelia	Radio XHMO, S. de R.L. de C.V.	Match	Contemporary hit radio
XHGT-FM	94.1 FM	Zamora	Radio Zamora, S. de R.L.	W Radio	News/talk
XHCJ-FM	94.3 FM	Apatzingán	Manuel Flores y Compañía, S. en N.C.	Los 40	Contemporary hit radio
XHPMAR-FM	94.3 FM	Maravatío	Media FM, S.A. de C.V.	Media News Radio	News/talk
XHSICG-FM	94.3 FM	San Jerónimo Purenchécuaro	Comunidad Indígena de San Jerónimo Purenchécuaro	—N/a	—N/a
XHPTAC-FM	94.5 FM	Tacámbaro	Grupo La Voz del Viento, S.A. de C.V.	Ke Buena	Regional Mexican
XHDEN-FM	94.7 FM	Lázaro Cárdenas	Gobierno del Estado de Michoacán	SM Radio	Public radio
XHTSI-FM	94.7 FM	San Juan Parangaricutiro	Kurhándi, A.C.	Radio Tsipikua	Community radio
XHEXL-FM	94.9 FM	Pátzcuaro	XEXL, S.A. de C.V.	La Ley	Regional Mexican
XHAPM-FM	95.1 FM	Apatzingán	José Laris Rodríguez	Candela	Regional Mexican
XHLX-FM	95.1 FM	Zitácuaro	Radio Zitácuaro, S.A.	La Mejor	Regional Mexican
XHIAM-FM	95.3 FM	Morelia	Secretaría de Cultura	—N/a	—N/a
XHCMM-FM	95.5 FM	Coalcomán de Vázquez Pallares	Homero Bautista Duarte	Ke Buena	Regional Mexican
XHKN-FM	95.5 FM	Huetamo de Nuñez	Grupo Tredi Comunicaciones, S.A. de C.V.	La Z	Regional Mexican
XHLCM-FM	95.7 FM	Lázaro Cardenas	XELCM-AM, S.A. de C.V.	La Poderosa	Regional Mexican
XHJIQ-FM	95.9 FM	Jiquilpan	Gobierno del Estado de Michoacán	SM Radio	Public radio
XHCCBE-FM	95.9 FM	Maravatío de Ocampo	Señal Monarca, S.A. de C.V.	Globo	Adult contemporary
XHAMB-FM	95.9 FM	Tacámbaro	Gobierno del Estado de Michoacán	SM Radio	Public radio
XHPLPM-FM	96.1 FM	La Piedad	Rodrigo Rodríguez Reyes	El Kuino FM	Regional Mexican
XHCR-FM	96.3 FM	Morelia	Radio Tremor Morelia, S.A. de C.V.	La Z	Regional Mexican
XHCCBG-FM	96.5 FM	Zamora, Jacona	Saga del Cupatitzio, S.A. de C.V.	La Poderosa	Regional Mexican
XHSCHQ-FM	96.7 FM	Heroica Zitácuaro	Huetamo Comunicaciones, A.C.	La Suprema	Community radio
XHSCCU-FM	96.9 FM	Álvaro Obregón	Radio Aguerrida, A.C.	Radio Aguerrido Mayor	Community radio
XHCAP-FM	96.9 FM	Zacapu	Gobierno del Estado de Michoacán	SM Radio	Public radio
XHPNIM-FM	97.1 FM	Nueva Italia	Media FM, S.A. de C.V.	La Jefa	Regional Mexican
XHORE-FM	97.3 FM	Morelia	Fundación Radiodifusoras Capital, A.C.	Lokura FM	Contemporary hit radio
XHOCU-FM	97.3 FM	Ocumicho	Comunidad Indígena Purépecha de Ocumicho	Khúmati	Community radio
XHTZI-FM	97.5 FM	Apatzingán	Gobierno del Estado de Michoacán	SM Radio	Public radio
XHZU-FM	97.7 FM	Zacapu	Promotores de Radio, S.A.	Candela	Regional Mexican
XHELI-FM	98.1 FM	Morelia	Universidad Vasco de Quiroga, A.C.	Uve Radio	University radio
XHPZAM-FM	98.1 FM	Zamora, Jacona	TV Rey de Occidente, S.A. de C.V.	Exa FM	Contemporary hit radio
XHEML-FM	98.3 FM	Apatzingán	XEML, S.A.	La Ranchera de Apatzingán	Regional Mexican
XHMVM-FM	98.3 FM	Maravatio	Voz de Maravatío, A.C.	Voz de Maravatío	Variety
XHZI-FM	98.5 FM	Zacapu	Organización Apric, S.A. de C.V.	La Z	Regional Mexican
XHCSBP-FM	98.7 FM	Huetamo de Núñez	Michoacán Te Escucha, A.C.	—N/a	—N/a
XHEOJ-FM	98.7 FM	Lázaro Cárdenas	Sucesión de Francisco Bautista Valencia	Nueve87 Radio Centro	Adult contemporary
XHSCGV-FM	98.9 FM	Jarácuaro	Comunidad Indígena de Jarácuaro Asentada en Erongarícuaro	—N/a	—N/a
XHSCGW-FM	98.9 FM	Zamora, Jacona	Radio Tzirondaru, A.C.	—N/a	—N/a
XHPGAN-FM	99.1 FM	Apatzingán	Radiodifusoras Capital, S.A. de C.V.	Lokura FM Grupera	Regional Mexican
XHMOM-FM	99.1 FM	Morelia	Flavio René Acevedo	Clasics FM	English classic hits
XHZIR-FM	99.3 FM	Tingambato	Ziraño, A.C.	Voces 99.3 FM, Radio Tingambato	Community radio
XHTGM-FM	99.5 FM	Tangancícuaro	Grupo Cultural Tangancícuaro, A.C.	Radio Manantial	Community radio
XHHID-FM	99.7 FM	Ciudad Hidalgo	Gobierno del Estado de Michoacán	SM Radio	Public radio
XHLAC-FM	99.7 FM	Lázaro Cárdenas	Instituto Mexicano de la Radio	Radio Azul	Public radio
XHRUA-FM	99.7 FM	Uruapan	Gobierno del Estado de Michoacán	SM Radio	Public radio
XHSCHP-FM	99.9 FM	Tarímbaro	FH Comunicadores de Michoacán, A.C.	Stereo 100	Community radio
XHAGI-FM	100.3 FM	Aguililla (Note: Communities listed by the IFT: El Limón, Dos Aguas, El Aguaje, Naranjo de Chila, Naranjo Viejo, El Charapo, El Aguaje, La Bocanita, El Potrero, La Huerta, El Limoncito, Peña Colorada and Rancherías)	Expresión Cultural Aguililla, A.C.	Expresión FM	Community radio
XHUF-FM	100.5 FM	Uruapan	XEUF, S.A.	StereoMía	Regional Mexican
XHI-FM	100.9 FM	Morelia	Carlos de Jesús Quiñones Armendáriz	Máxima	Pop
XHPAPM-FM	100.9 FM	Apatzingán	Media FM, S.A. de C.V.	Media News Radio	News/talk
XHIW-FM	101.3 FM	Uruapan	Grupo Radio FyL, S.A. de C.V.	Canal Juvenil	Contemporary hit radio
XHEMM-FM	101.7 FM	Morelia	Radio XHEMM, S. de R.L. de C.V.	Mix	English classic hits
XHURM-FM	102.1 FM	Uruapan	XEURM-AM, S.A. de C.V.	La Mexicana	Regional Mexican
XHRPA-FM	102.5 FM	Morelia	Dígalo Cantando, S.A. de C.V.	Radio Ranchito	Regional Mexican
XHSCBJ-FM	102.7 FM	Maravatío	La Tarasca de Maravatío, A.C.	Radio Tarasca	Community radio
XHXAN-FM	102.9 FM	Tacámbaro	Xanarapani Tacámbaro, A.C.	Xanarapani Radio	Community radio
XHZIT-FM	103.1 FM	Heróica Zitácuaro	Gobierno del Estado de Michoacán	SM Radio	Public radio
XHZMA-FM	103.1 FM	Zamora	Gobierno del Estado de Michoacán	SM Radio	Public radio
XHSIBT-FM	103.1 FM	San Andrés Tziróndaro, Quiroga	Radio El Viejito Tatakeri, A.C.	—N/a	—N/a
XHMICH-FM	103.3 FM	Morelia	La Voz del Viento, A.C.	Vox 103.3 FM	News/talk
XHUET-FM	103.5 FM	Huetamo	Rey Tariacuri, A.C.	La Guacha	Community radio
XHPATZ-FM	103.7 FM	Pátzcuaro	Media FM, S.A. de C.V.	Media News Radio	News/talk
XHESOL-FM	103.9 FM	El Jaral	Radio Sol, S.A. de C.V.	Radio Sol	Regional Mexican
XHEZM-FM	103.9 FM	Zamora	La Voz del Comercio de Zamora, S. de R.L.	La Zamorana	Romantic
XHSV-FM	104.3 FM	Morelia	Universidad Michoacana de San Nicolás de Hidalgo	Radio Nicolaita	University radio
XHMXS-FM	104.5 FM	Cherato, Cheratillo, 18 de Marzo y Sicuicho, Los Reyes Municipality	La Mexicanita Sapichu, A.C.	La Mexicanita	Community radio
XHAND-FM	104.9 FM	Puruándiro	Gobierno del Estado de Michoacán	SM Radio	Public radio
XHCSBO-FM	105.1 FM	Ciudad Lázaro Cárdenas	Modelo Radiofónico Comunitario para el Desarrollo Integral del Ser Humano, A.C.	Radio Vida	Variety
XHATM-FM	105.1 FM	Morelia	Sucesión de José Laris Iturbide	Radio Fórmula	News/talk
XHTNC-FM	105.1 FM	Tancítaro	Comunicadores de Tancítaro, A.C.	Radio Cultural Tancítaro	Community radio
XHSCED-FM	105.5 FM	Morelia	Ciudadanos Michoacanos en Movimiento, A.C.	La Poderosa	Regional Mexican
XHJAC-FM	105.7 FM	Jacona (Zamora) Tangancícuaro y Santiago Tangamandapio	Fundación Cultural para la Sociedad Mexicana, A.C.	Radio María	Catholic
XHSCCI-FM	105.7 FM	Pedernales	Comunicación para el Desarrollo Social de la Comunidad de Pedernales, A.C.	Radio Pedernales	Community radio
XHECH-FM	105.7 FM	Purépero de Echáiz	Echais 88, A.C.	Radio Purépero	Community radio
XHSCAM-FM	105.9 FM	Ziracuaretiro	Radio Juchari Iretarhu Anapu, A.C.	Radio Juchari	Community radio
XHCHIL-FM	106.1 FM	Chilchota	Ojtakuarhu, A.C.	Radio Comunitaria Eraxámani	Community radio
XHSCCN-FM	106.1 FM	Morelia	RM Morelia, A.C.	Vive 106.1	Community radio
XHSCAZ-FM	106.5 FM	Tiquicheo	La Voz del Canario, A.C.	La Voz del Canario	Community radio
XHSCAL-FM	106.7 FM	Contepec	La Monarca de Contepec, A.C.	La Monarca de Contepec	Community radio
XHSCLA-FM	106.9 FM	San Lucas	Armando Comunicaciones, A.C.	—N/a	—N/a
XHTGAN-FM	107.1 FM	Tangancícuaro	Radio Erandi, A.C.	Radio Erandi	Community radio
XHETA-FM	107.1 FM	Zitácuaro	Sucesión de Pichir Esteban Polos	Esencia 107.1 FM	English classic hits
XHSCAI-FM	107.3 FM	Santa Clara del Cobre	Mentes Que Piensan Manos Que Trabajan, A.C.	La Fragua	Community radio
XHSCMI-FM	107.5 FM	Buenos Aires	Comunicación de Tierra Caliente, A.C.	—N/a	—N/a
XHUARO-FM	107.7 FM	Pátzcuaro	Pátzcuaro en Comunidad, A.C.	Romántika 107.7 FM	Romantic
XHSCFY-FM	107.9 FM	Coahuayana de Hidalgo	Radio Social Comunitaria Coahuayana, A.C.	Radio Albatros	Community radio
XHTUMI-FM	107.9 FM	El Malacate	Instituto Nacional de Los Pueblos Indígenas	La Voz de la Sierra Oriente	Indigenous radio
XHTM-FM	107.9 FM	Tepalcatepec	Radio Cultural de Tepalcatepec, A.C.	Cultural FM	Community radio
XHRHI-FM	107.9 FM	Uruapan	Uandarhi, A.C.	Uandarhi	Community radio

== Defunct stations ==
- XEBC-AM, Morelia (1939-1941)
- XERNB-AM 1450, Sahuayo de Morelos
- XHCHM-FM 97.7, Ciudad Hidalgo (2013–2020)
- XHPAT-FM 106.5, Pátzcuaro (2012–2020)
