= 97.3 FM =

FM radio frequency

The following radio stations broadcast on FM frequency 97.3 MHz:

== Argentina ==
- Arenales in Lanteri, Santa Fe
- Boing in Rosario, Santa Fe
- Ciudad in Corral de Bustos, Córdoba
- radió express 87.7/, Córdoba capital
- Estación in Marcos Juárez, Córdoba
- La 97 in Mar del Plata, Buenos Aires
- La Caterva in Buenos Aires
- La Punta in La Punta, San Luis
- La sol in Santa Isabel, La Pampa
- Light in San Juan
- LRH 370 Horizonte in Montecarlo, Misiones
- Manantial in Coronel Dorrego, Buenos Aires
- Radio María in Tres Lomas, Buenos Aires
- Radio María in Villa Cura Brochero, Córdoba
- Spacial in Catamarca
- LRI358 UTN in Rafaela, Santa Fe
- ZONYDO in Buenos Aires

== Australia ==
- 97.3 ABC Illawarra in Illawarra, New South Wales
- ABC Classic in Griffith, New South Wales
- 4BFM in Brisbane, Queensland
- 3HCR in Omeo, Victoria

== Latvia ==
- Radio Marija Latvija

== Lithuania ==
- Žinių radijas in Vilnius

== Canada (Channel 247) ==
- CBAZ-FM in Sheet Harbour, Nova Scotia
- CBON-FM-19 in Nipigon, Ontario
- CFJO-FM in Thetford-Mines, Quebec
- CHBM-FM in Toronto, Ontario
- CHGA-FM in Maniwaki, Quebec
- CHWV-FM in Saint John, New Brunswick
- CIPR-FM in Pigeon River, Ontario
- CIRK-FM in Edmonton, Alberta
- CJAQ-FM-2 in Invermere, British Columbia
- CJCI-FM in Prince George, British Columbia
- CJIV-FM in Dryden, Ontario
- CJRG-FM-2 in Fontenelle, Quebec
- CJRM-FM in Labrador City, Newfoundland and Labrador
- CKLR-FM in Courtenay, British Columbia
- CKUA-FM-3 in Medicine Hat, Alberta
- CKUJ-FM in Kuujjuaq, Quebec
- VF2136 in Yellowknife, Northwest Territories
- VF2332 in Beardys First Nation, Saskatchewan
- VF2409 in Thunderchild First Nation, Saskatchewan
- VF7014 in Saskatoon, Saskatchewan

== Malaysia ==
- Kelantan FM in Central Kelantan

== Mexico ==
- XHAGC-FM in Aguascalientes, Aguascalientes
- XHCHI-FM in Chihuahua, Chihuahua
- XHCSCA-FM in Rioverde, San Luis Potosí
- XHDCC-FM in San Ildefonso, Tepeji del Río de Ocampo, Hidalgo
- XHECA-FM in Amecameca, Estado de México
- XHGF-FM in Gutiérrez Zamora, Veracruz
- XHGI-FM in Zacatipan, San Luis Potosí
- XHHIS-FM in Los Mochis, Sinaloa
- XHHCC-FM in Hércules, Coahuila
- XHNEZ-FM in Ciudad Nezahualcóyotl, State of Mexico
- XHOCU-FM in Ocumicho, Michoacán
- XHORE-FM in Morelia, Michoacán
- XHOV-FM in Ixhuatlancillo, Veracruz
- XHPETO-FM in Peto, Yucatán
- XHPMAH-FM in Mahahual, Quintana Roo
- XHRAC-FM in Campeche, Campeche
- XHSOS-FM in El Sifón (Agua Prieta), Sonora
- XHSPN-FM in Santiago Pinotepa Nacional, Oaxaca
- XHSR-FM in Monterrey, Nuevo León
- XHUAU-FM in Huautla de Jiménez, Oaxaca
- XHVB-FM in Villahermosa, Tabasco
- XHVZ-FM in Cuernavaca, Morelos
- XHZR-FM in Zaragoza, Coahuila

== New Zealand ==
- Coast (New Zealand radio) in Bay of Plenty

== Philippines ==
- DYKP in Boracay, Aklan
- DXRN in Surigao City

== United Kingdom ==
- Forth 1 in Edinburgh
- Heart West in Ilfracombe
- LBC in London

== United States (Channel 247) ==
- KAJA (FM) in San Antonio, Texas
- KAML in Gillette, Wyoming
- KBCO in Boulder, Colorado
- KBHJ in Blythe, California
- KCMK-LP in La Rue, Texas
- KDEW-FM in De Witt, Arkansas
- KDNW in Duluth, Minnesota
- KDNZ in Pecos, Texas
- KEAG in Anchorage, Alaska
- KEBF-LP in Morro Bay, California
- KEPW-LP in Eugene, Oregon
- KFMR in Central Heights–Midland City, Arizona
- KGRR in Epworth, Iowa
- KHDK in New London, Iowa
- KHEL-LP in Rogers, Arkansas
- KHKI in Des Moines, Iowa
- KIRO in Tacoma, Washington
- KJAP-LP in Edinburg, Texas
- KJAT-LP in Sulphur Springs, Arkansas
- KJMG in Bastrop, Louisiana
- KJUK-LP in Hooks, Texas
- KKJQ in Garden City, Kansas
- KKNG-FM in Blanchard, Oklahoma
- KKRC-FM in Sioux Falls, South Dakota
- KKRS in Davenport, Washington
- KKSS in Santa Fe, New Mexico
- KLCE in Blackfoot, Idaho
- KLLC in San Francisco, California
- KLRX in Lee's Summit, Missouri
- KMDL in Kaplan, Louisiana
- KMEI-LP in Kamiah, Idaho
- KNCQ in Redding, California
- KNEH-LP in Helena, Montana
- KOBM in Blair, Nebraska
- KOLC in Carson City, Nevada
- KPSQ-LP in Fayetteville, Arkansas
- KPUY in Garwood, Texas
- KQHN in Waskom, Texas
- KQSB-LP in Paris, Texas
- KRGY in Aurora, Nebraska
- KRJK in Lamont, California
- KRKH in Wailea-Makena, Hawaii
- KRVY in Starbuck, Minnesota
- KSHR-FM in Coquille, Oregon
- KTCM in Madison, Missouri
- KTNG in Connerville, Oklahoma
- KTTU-FM in New Deal, Texas
- KWFN in San Diego, California
- KXUS in Springfield, Missouri
- KYRX in Marble Hill, Missouri
- WAEV in Savannah, Georgia
- WAUF-LP in Auburn, Alabama
- WBIC-LP in Wilson, North Carolina
- WBRJ-LP in Baton Rouge, Louisiana
- WCGY-FM in Jefferson, New Hampshire
- WDBW-LP in Port Saint Joe, Florida
- WDEE in Reed City, Michigan
- WENJ in Millville, New Jersey
- WENV-LP in Gainesboro, Tennessee
- WFLC in Miami, Florida
- WFMM in Sumrall, Mississippi
- WFMN in Flora, Mississippi
- WFYR in Elmwood, Illinois
- WGH in Newport News, Virginia
- WGVD-LP in Dwight, Illinois
- WHIH-LP in Whitesboro, New York
- WHPW-LP in Harpswell, Maine
- WHRC-LP in Chippewa Falls, Wisconsin
- WJDF in Orange, Massachusetts
- WJFD in New Bedford, Massachusetts
- WJSN in Jackson, Kentucky
- WJWC-LP in Grand Rapids, Michigan
- WJZE in Oak Harbor, Ohio
- WJZK-LP in Ft. Walton Beach, Florida
- WKBC in North Wilkesboro, North Carolina
- WKJQ-FM in Parsons, Tennessee
- WKSO (FM) in Natchez, Mississippi
- WKWK in Wheeling, West Virginia
- WMEE in Fort Wayne, Indiana
- WMFJ-LP in Augusta, Georgia
- WMJO in Essexville, Michigan
- WMNX in Wilmington, North Carolina
- WMYY in Schoharie, New York
- WOYE in Rio Grande, Puerto Rico
- WPCL in Spangler, Pennsylvania
- WPYA in Gardendale, Alabama
- WQFB-LP in Flagler Beach, Florida
- WRNW in Milwaukee, Wisconsin
- WRAK in Bainbridge, Georgia
- WRAN (FM) in Taylorville, Illinois
- WRIR-LP in Richmond, Virginia
- WRUL in Carmi, Illinois
- WRVV in Harrisburg, Pennsylvania
- WSKY in Micanopy, Florida
- WSWO-LP in Huber Heights, Ohio
- WTNV in Tiptonville, Tennessee
- WUUQ in South Pittsburg, Tennessee
- WUVI-LP in John Brewers Bay, U.S. Virgin Islands
- WWCC-LP in West Lafayette, Indiana
- WYGY in Fort Thomas, Kentucky
- WYXL in Ithaca, New York
- WZAD in Wurtsboro, New York
- WZBG in Litchfield, Connecticut
- WZVZ-LP in Six Mile, South Carolina

== UAE ==
- KADAK FM: Abu Dhabi
- Stereo 97.3FM: Dubai

== Vietnam ==
- Can Tho Radio in Can Tho City
