= 1340 AM =

AM radio frequency

1340 kHz is defined as a Class C (local) frequency in the coterminous United States and such stations on this frequency are limited to 1,000 watts. U.S. stations outside the coterminous United States (Alaska, Hawaii, Puerto Rico, & the U.S. Virgin Islands) on this frequency are defined as Class B (regional) stations.

The following radio stations broadcast on AM frequency 1340 kHz:

== Bermuda ==
- ZBM

== Canada ==
Call sign	City of license	Daytime power (kW)	Nighttime power (kW)	Transmitter coordinates
CFKC	Creston, British Columbia	0.25	0.25	49.0931°N 116.532°W
CINL	Ashcroft, British Columbia	1	1	50.7583°N 121.298°W
CJEV	Elkford, British Columbia	0.05	0.05	50.0219°N 114.926°W

== Cuba ==
- Radio GTMO transmits news and talk radio programs to American military personnel and their families at Guantanamo Bay Naval Base.

== Mexico ==
- XEAPM-AM in Apatzingán, Michoacan
- XEBK-AM in Nuevo Laredo, Tamaulipas
- XECR-AM in Morelia, Michoacan
- XECSAC-AM in San Luis Potosi, San Luis Potosi
- XEDH-AM in Cd. Acuña, Coahuila
- XEDKT-AM in Guadalajara, Jalisco
- XENV-AM in Monterrey, Nuevo León

== United States ==
Call sign	City of license	Facility ID	Class	Daytime power (kW)	Nighttime power (kW)	Unlimited power (kW)	Transmitter coordinates
KACH	Preston, Idaho	74476	C	1	1		42.124444°N 111.845833°W
KAND	Corsicana, Texas	13968	C			1	32.114722°N 96.463056°W
KATA	Arcata, California	41244	C			1	40.853611°N 124.083611°W
KBBR	North Bend, Oregon	5212	C	1	1		43.432778°N 124.208333°W
KBNW	Bend, Oregon	160749	C	1	0.5		44.079722°N 121.282778°W
KBTA	Batesville, Arkansas	72260	C			1	35.744167°N 91.639167°W
KCAT	Pine Bluff, Arkansas	30138	C			1	34.213056°N 92.031389°W
KCBL	Fresno, California	9749	C			1	36.764167°N 119.785556°W
KCCE	San Angelo, Texas	14514	C	1	1		31.478611°N 100.463889°W
KCLU	Santa Barbara, California	10327	C	0.65	0.65		34.418611°N 119.686111°W
KCQL	Aztec, New Mexico	29520	C			1	36.821389°N 107.999444°W
KDCO	Denver, Colorado	34585	C	1	1		39.683333°N 105.006667°W
KDLM	Detroit Lakes, Minnesota	37000	C			1	46.837222°N 95.838056°W
KDTD	Kansas City, Kansas	33697	C			1	39.113889°N 94.679167°W
KGFW	Kearney, Nebraska	9933	C	1	1		40.668056°N 99.081111°W
KGGS	Garden City, Kansas	160947	C	1	0.88		37.968889°N 100.932222°W
KGHM	Midwest City, Oklahoma	58388	C	1	1		35.499444°N 97.509167°W
KGKG	Salida, Colorado	1019	C			1	38.531944°N 106.015°W
KHUB	Fremont, Nebraska	34550	C	0.5	0.25		41.432778°N 96.454444°W
KICK	Springfield, Missouri	34563	C	1	1		37.092778°N 93.266389°W
KIHR	Hood River, Oregon	12433	C	1	1		45.701667°N 121.534722°W
KIJV	Huron, South Dakota	15264	C	1	1		44.345833°N 98.209722°W
KIKO	Apache Junction, Arizona	72477	C	1	0.93		33.382222°N 111.535833°W
KJMU	Sand Springs, Oklahoma	47101	C	0.5	1		36.135833°N 96.092222°W
KJOX	Kennewick, Washington	53139	C	1	1		46.221667°N 119.186111°W
KKAM	Lubbock, Texas	60798	C			1	33.556667°N 101.862778°W
KKGK	Las Vegas, Nevada	40756	C	1	0.88		36.213056°N 115.1625°W
KLID	Poplar Bluff, Missouri	7336	C			1	36.7675°N 90.369722°W
KLOO	Corvallis, Oregon	67594	C	1	1		44.593889°N 123.225°W
KOLE	Port Arthur, Texas	62238	C			1	29.904167°N 93.936111°W
KOMY	La Selva Beach, California	22694	C	1	0.85		36.961944°N 121.980833°W
KPGE	Page, Arizona	36349	C	1	1		36.905556°N 111.457222°W
KPOK	Bowman, North Dakota	67796	C			1	46.18°N 103.37°W
KPRK	Livingston, Montana	37816	C			1	45.6725°N 110.539167°W
KPYV	Oroville, California	50710	C	1	1		39.508889°N 121.598333°W
KQDE	Evergreen, Montana	160700	C	1	0.67		48.238889°N 114.2525°W
KQIS	Bethel Heights, Arkansas	160838	C	1	1		36.211944°N 94.127222°W
KRBA	Lufkin, Texas	63326	C			1	31.364722°N 94.718889°W
KRBT	Eveleth, Minnesota	29196	C	1	1		47.481944°N 92.531667°W
KROC	Rochester, Minnesota	61321	C			1	44.029722°N 92.491944°W
KROS	Clinton, Iowa	35557	C	1	1		41.86°N 90.205°W
KSEK	Pittsburg, Kansas	33698	C			1	37.395556°N 94.678333°W
KSGT	Jackson, Wyoming	10338	C	1	1		43.4625°N 110.793611°W
KSID	Sidney, Nebraska	35602	C	1	1		41.131111°N 102.971944°W
KSMO	Salem, Missouri	35610	C			1	37.626667°N 91.535833°W
KTMM	Grand Junction, Colorado	47151	C	1	1		39.126389°N 108.636667°W
KTMP	Heber City, Utah	14478	C	1	1		40.501389°N 111.448611°W
KTOQ	Rapid City, South Dakota	67309	C			1	44.068333°N 103.169722°W
KTOX	Needles, California	12189	C			1	34.852778°N 114.621944°W
KTPI	Mojave, California	66229	C			1	35.039722°N 118.149167°W
KUOW	Tumwater, Washington	20298	C	1	1		47.006944°N 122.918611°W
KVBR	Brainerd, Minnesota	60496	C	1	1		46.348056°N 94.181667°W
KVGC	Jackson, California	160449	C	0.44	0.25		38.355833°N 120.768889°W
KVIV	El Paso, Texas	17740	C	1	0.91		31.760278°N 106.435556°W
KVNN	Victoria, Texas	28474	C			1	28.830278°N 97.009167°W
KVOT	Taos, New Mexico	137840	C	1	1		36.39°N 105.586389°W
KWKC	Abilene, Texas	73682	C			1	32.420556°N 99.731667°W
KWLE	Anacortes, Washington	29237	C			1	48.495556°N 122.604167°W
KWLM	Willmar, Minnesota	36377	C			1	45.133333°N 95.043056°W
KWOR	Worland, Wyoming	35897	C			1	44.017222°N 107.970556°W
KWVR	Enterprise, Oregon	70744	C	1	1		45.399444°N 117.258333°W
KWXY	Cathedral City, California	24252	C			1	33.801944°N 116.462222°W
KXEO	Mexico, Missouri	35951	C	0.96	0.96		39.166667°N 91.861944°W
KXPO	Grafton, North Dakota	34475	C			1	48.398056°N 97.448889°W
KXQZ	Wendell, Idaho	160750	C	1	1		42.723889°N 114.669722°W
KYCN	Wheatland, Wyoming	60644	C			0.25	42.045556°N 104.946389°W
KYLT	Missoula, Montana	32389	C			1	46.882222°N 113.985556°W
KYNS	San Luis Obispo, California	73039	C	0.79	0.79		35.234167°N 120.675833°W
KYSP	Wenatchee, Washington	59049	C	1	1		47.397222°N 120.273611°W
KZNG	Hot Springs, Arkansas	16570	C			1	34.495278°N 93.024167°W
WADE	Wadesboro, North Carolina	28816	C			1	34.9525°N 80.05°W
WAGN	Menominee, Michigan	24584	C			1	45.1075°N 87.606944°W
WAGR	Lumberton, North Carolina	41310	C			1	34.599444°N 79.009167°W
WALL	Middletown, New York	3137	C	1	1		41.456944°N 74.44°W
WAML	Laurel, Mississippi	52617	C	1	1		31.634444°N 89.573056°W
WBAC	Cleveland, Tennessee	66955	C			1	35.165°N 84.853611°W
WBAN	Veazie, Maine	128808	C	1	0.63		44.852778°N 68.678889°W
WBBT	Lyons, Georgia	66967	C			1	32.213333°N 82.331944°W
WBIW	Bedford, Indiana	438	C			1	38.873056°N 86.476111°W
WBLB	Pulaski, Virginia	48921	C	1	1		37.065833°N 80.784167°W
WBNC	Conway, New Hampshire	161077	C	0.62	0.62		43.98°N 71.110833°W
WBRK	Pittsfield, Massachusetts	71232	C			1	42.45°N 73.215278°W
WBVR	Bowling Green, Kentucky	27243	C			1	37.009444°N 86.4525°W
WCBQ	Oxford, North Carolina	54594	C			1	36.3075°N 78.576944°W
WCDT	Winchester, Tennessee	22352	C			1	35.180833°N 86.092778°W
WCHB	Royal Oak, Michigan	61679	C	1	1		42.469444°N 83.115°W
WCMI	Ashland, Kentucky	21588	C	1	1		38.4675°N 82.596944°W
WCSR	Hillsdale, Michigan	71299	C	0.5	0.25		41.928056°N 84.636111°W
WDSR	Lake City, Florida	2874	C			1	30.155556°N 82.637222°W
WEKY	Richmond, Kentucky	4811	C			1	37.716667°N 84.306944°W
WENT	Gloversville, New York	72291	C			1	43.025°N 74.352778°W
WEPM	Martinsburg, West Virginia	53484	C			1	39.463333°N 77.986389°W
WFEB	Sylacauga, Alabama	700	C			1	33.171111°N 86.2325°W
WGAA	Cedartown, Georgia	7829	C	1	1		34.035°N 85.251111°W
WGAU	Athens, Georgia	11709	C			1	33.941111°N 83.398611°W
WGAW	Gardner, Massachusetts	72088	C			1	42.5925°N 71.988889°W
WGRV	Greeneville, Tennessee	54602	C			1	36.169444°N 82.847778°W
WHAP	Hopewell, Virginia	33900	C			1	37.296111°N 77.313889°W
WHAT	Philadelphia, Pennsylvania	33686	C			1	40.001667°N 75.209722°W
WIFN	Atlanta, Georgia	1098	C			1	33.748889°N 84.407222°W
WITS	Sebring, Florida	57629	C	1	1		27.508333°N 81.422222°W
WIZE	Springfield, Ohio	62208	C	1	1		39.9425°N 83.7875°W
WJAM	Selma, Alabama	947	C	1	1		32.425278°N 86.996389°W
WJOI	Milwaukee, Wisconsin	36371	C	1	1		43.046944°N 87.981111°W
WJOL	Joliet, Illinois	62235	C			1	41.535°N 88.054167°W
WJPF	Herrin, Illinois	19058	C			0.77	37.834444°N 89.027778°W
WJRI	Lenoir, North Carolina	73149	C			1	35.894167°N 81.558333°W
WJRW	Grand Rapids, Michigan	41679	C			1	42.951389°N 85.698611°W
WKCB	Hindman, Kentucky	27250	C			1	37.329167°N 83.004722°W
WKGN	Knoxville, Tennessee	68146	C			1	35.955556°N 83.970556°W
WKRM	Columbia, Tennessee	41995	C			1	35.610556°N 87.056111°W
WKSN	Jamestown, New York	65592	C	0.26	0.52		42.104722°N 79.2575°W
WLDY	Ladysmith, Wisconsin	21696	C			1	45.466389°N 91.123056°W
WLEW	Bad Axe, Michigan	67045	C	1	1		43.800833°N 83.023056°W
WLOK	Memphis, Tennessee	24214	C			1	35.116944°N 90.016389°W
WLSG	Wilmington, North Carolina	58364	C	1	1		34.231111°N 77.955°W
WLVL	Lockport, New York	14714	C	1	1		43.175°N 78.710833°W
WMBN	Petoskey, Michigan	65929	C			1	45.347222°N 84.966944°W
WMBO	Auburn, New York	25001	C			1	42.951389°N 76.584722°W
WMDR	Augusta, Maine	37469	C	1	1		44.328056°N 69.765°W
WMHZ	Holt, Alabama	161136	C	1	1		33.214444°N 87.489444°W
WMID	Atlantic City, New Jersey	1307	C			0.89	39.376389°N 74.452222°W
WMSA	Massena, New York	97	C	0.91	0.91		44.903056°N 74.883889°W
WMUN	Muncie, Indiana	17601	C	1	1		40.161667°N 85.378056°W
WNBH	New Bedford, Massachusetts	25866	C	1	0.96		41.641389°N 70.959444°W
WNBS	Murray, Kentucky	29695	C			1	36.628333°N 88.301111°W
WNCO	Ashland, Ohio	2926	C			1	40.840278°N 82.357222°W
WOKS	Columbus, Georgia	15846	C			1	32.451944°N 84.973611°W
WOUB	Athens, Ohio	50145	C	0.5	1		39.329167°N 82.091389°W
WPBR	Lantana, Florida	50333	C			0.81	26.62°N 80.080833°W
WPOL	Winston-Salem, North Carolina	72970	C			1	36.073889°N 80.255278°W
WRAW	Reading, Pennsylvania	69566	C			1	40.324167°N 75.919444°W
WRHI	Rock Hill, South Carolina	50777	C			1	34.983056°N 81.019722°W
WROD	Daytona Beach, Florida	36169	C			1	29.188611°N 81.007778°W
WSBM	Florence, Alabama	5272	C			1	34.797222°N 87.665°W
WSOY	Decatur, Illinois	36945	C	1	1		39.815°N 89.002222°W
WSSC	Sumter, South Carolina	39621	C	1	1		33.929167°N 80.324722°W
WSTA	Charlotte Amalie, Virgin Islands	50765	B	1	1		18.336111°N 64.954722°W
WSTJ	St. Johnsbury, Vermont	49403	C			1	44.418333°N 71.995833°W
WTAN	Clearwater, Florida	17574	C	1	1		27.9725°N 82.796667°W
WTIF	Tifton, Georgia	67097	C	1	1		31.471111°N 83.486667°W
WTRC	Elkhart, Indiana	51728	C			1	41.674444°N 85.9475°W
WTRN	Tyrone, Pennsylvania	1056	C	1	1		40.663333°N 78.256667°W
WTYS	Marianna, Florida	72512	C	0.78	0.78		30.763333°N 85.231111°W
WVCV	Orange, Virginia	54873	C			1	38.253889°N 78.120833°W
WWFL	Clermont, Florida	33215	C			1	28.583056°N 81.705278°W
WWNA	Aguadilla, Puerto Rico	49815	B	0.95	0.95		18.4°N 67.163333°W
WWPA	Williamsport, Pennsylvania	58315	C			1	41.229167°N 77.0125°W
WYBC	New Haven, Connecticut	72820	C	1	0.88		41.2925°N 72.953333°W
WYCB	Washington, District of Columbia	7038	C	1	1		38.955278°N 77.004167°W
WYCK	Plains, Pennsylvania	36835	C			0.81	41.250278°N 75.825556°W
WYNF	Augusta, Georgia	59248	C	1	0.99		33.493611°N 81.997778°W
