= 980 AM =

AM radio frequency

The following radio stations broadcast on AM frequency 980 kHz: 980 AM is classified as a regional broadcast frequency by the U.S. Federal Communications Commission and the Canadian Radio-television and Telecommunications Commission.

== In Argentina ==
- LT39 in Victoria
- LU37 Radio 37 in General Pico, La Pampa
- Ovacion in José C Paz, Buenos Aires

== In Canada ==
Call sign	City of license	Class	Daytime power (kW)	Nighttime power (kW)	Transmitter coordinates
CFPL	London, Ontario	B	10	5	42.8914°N 81.2003°W
CJME	Regina, Saskatchewan	B	10	10	50.353611°N 104.6225°W

== In Mexico ==
- XELC-AM in La Piedad, Michoacán
- XELFFS-AM in Izúcar de Matamoros, Puebla

== In the United States ==
Call sign	City of license	Facility ID	Class	Daytime power (kW)	Nighttime power (kW)	Unlimited power (kW)	Transmitter coordinates
KCAB	Dardanelle, Arkansas	31885	D	5	0.032		35.222222°N 93.168889°W
KDSJ	Deadwood, South Dakota	24553	B	5	1		44.3825°N 103.662222°W
KEYQ	Fresno, California	2098	D	0.5	0.048		36.741111°N 119.853333°W
KFWB	Los Angeles, California	25457	B			5	34.069722°N 118.193056°W
KGLN	Glenwood Springs, Colorado	12373	B	2	0.225		39.552778°N 107.33°W
KKMS	Richfield, Minnesota	18518	B			5	44.788333°N 93.215°W
KMBZ	Kansas City, Missouri	6382	B	9	5		39.040278°N 94.508333°W
KMIN	Grants, New Mexico	15845	D	5	0.23		35.0975°N 107.871944°W
KNTR	Lake Havasu City, Arizona	38310	D	1	0.049		34.503333°N 114.357778°W
KOKA	Shreveport, Louisiana	9222	D	5	0.079		32.526111°N 93.821944°W
KQUE	Rosenberg-Richmond, Texas	57804	B	5	4		29.821944°N 95.882778°W
KSGM	Chester, Illinois	17305	B	1	0.47		37.787778°N 89.905833°W
KSPZ	Ammon, Idaho	55238	B	5	1		43.523056°N 112.01°W
KSVC	Richfield, Utah	41897	B	10	1		38.788056°N 112.011667°W (daytime); 38.761111°N 112.076389°W (nighttime)
KTCR	Selah, Washington	7918	B	5	0.5		46.640278°N 120.596667°W
KVLV	Fallon, Nevada	36243	D	5			39.496389°N 118.813889°W
KWSW	Eureka, California	19841	B	5	0.5		40.800556°N 124.1275°W
WAAV	Leland, North Carolina	25999	D	5	0.085		34.248333°N 78.001667°W
WAKV	Otsego, Michigan	22122	D	1	0.101		42.459167°N 85.732778°W
WAZS	Summerville, South Carolina	54839	D	1	0.131		33.0325°N 80.2°W
WCAP	Lowell, Massachusetts	49416	B	5	5		42.654444°N 71.361944°W
WCUB	Two Rivers, Wisconsin	14702	B	5	5		44.063889°N 87.696944°W
WDDO	Perry, Georgia	54727	D	2.6	0.08		32.555556°N 83.737222°W
WDVH	Gainesville, Florida	18047	D	5	0.166		29.623889°N 82.288611°W
WDYN	Rossville, Georgia	72734	D	0.5	0.113		34.965°N 85.3°W
WHAW	Lost Creek, West Virginia	63489	D	2.5	0.047		39.040278°N 80.454444°W
WILK	Wilkes-Barre, Pennsylvania	34380	B	5	1		41.228333°N 75.948056°W
WITY	Danville, Illinois	69935	B			1	40.078056°N 87.638889°W
WJYK	Chase City, Virginia	71627	D	1			36.805278°N 78.440278°W
WKLY	Hartwell, Georgia	30043	D	1	0.149		34.357778°N 82.976389°W
WOFX	Troy, New York	37233	B	5	5		42.782222°N 73.835278°W
WONE	Dayton, Ohio	1903	B	5	5		39.6675°N 84.166944°W
WPFP	Park Falls, Wisconsin	48847	D	1	0.105		45.917778°N 90.449444°W
WPRE	Prairie du Chien, Wisconsin	53303	D	1	0.03		43.060833°N 91.157222°W
WRNE	Gulf Breeze, Florida	41010	B	4	1		30.485556°N 87.083611°W
WTEM	Washington, District of Columbia	25105	B	50	5		38.961944°N 76.973333°W
WTOB	Winston-Salem, North Carolina	40996	D	1.3	0.049		36.111111°N 80.243333°W
WTPA	Pompano Beach, Florida	27420	B	5	2.5		26.335°N 80.265278°W
WULR	York, South Carolina	74380	D	3	0.167		34.903056°N 81.0925°W
WWTB	Bristol, Virginia	6872	B	5	1		36.608333°N 82.16°W
WXLM	Groton, Connecticut	10454	D	1	0.072		41.384722°N 72.070278°W
WYFN	Nashville, Tennessee	8725	B	5	5		36.206944°N 86.673611°W
