= XHNEZ-FM =

Community radio station in Ciudad Nezahualcóyotl, State of Mexico

Ciudad Nezahualcóyotl, State of Mexico; Mexico
- Frequency: 97.3 FM
- Branding: En Neza Radio

Programming
- Format: Community radio

Ownership
- Owner: Voces Urbanas, Movimiento Alternativo de Información Social, A.C.

History
- First air date: April 28, 2018
- Call sign meaning: NEZahualcóyotl

Technical information
- Class: D
- ERP: 50 watts
- HAAT: 23.5 m
- Transmitter coordinates: 19°25′17.26″N 99°1′59.2″W

Links
- Website: nezaradio.org.mx

XHNEZ-FM is a community radio station broadcasting to Ciudad Nezahualcóyotl, State of Mexico on 97.3 FM. It is known as En Neza Radio and owned and operated by concessionaire Voces Urbanas, Movimiento Alternativo de Información Social (Urban Voices, Alternative Social Information Movement).

== History ==
En Neza Radio has been operating in some or other form since 1996, with the goal of improving Neza's poor image in the media.

In 2012, Voces Urbanas applied to Cofetel for a radio station permit; it was the second request the group had made, after an unfruitful 2004 application to the Secretariat of Communications and Transportation. In 2015, their application was denied by the Federal Telecommunications Institute (IFT), which had replaced Cofetel. Voces Urbanas filed an amparo lawsuit against the IFT, which ended with a favorable ruling for the station. The IFT awarded the station's concession in July 2017, and XHNEZ-FM held its official inauguration on April 28, 2018.

XHNEZ operates with a low power and coexists on the 97.3 frequency with another community station in the State of Mexico, XHECA-FM in Amecameca. It is the second station to operate in Ciudad Nezahualcóyotl, having been preceded by XHARO-FM 104.5, which signed on in 2010. The IFT awarded a third station for the city, XHSCCG-FM, in 2019.
