= Krpa =

Krpa or KRPA may refer to

- KRPA, a commercial radio station based in Oak Harbor, Washington, U.S.
- Kripa (Kṛpa in IAST transliteration), a character in Sanskrit epics of ancient India
- Milorad Pavlović-Krpa (1865–1957), Serbian writer, publicist, translator and editor
