= XHLC-FM =

XHLC-FM may refer to:

- XHLC-FM (Guadalajara), FM Globo 98.7 FM
- XHLC-FM (Michoacán) in La Piedad, Radio Pía 92.7 FM and 980 AM
