= WJWC =

WJWC may refer to:

- WJWC-LP, a low-power radio station (97.3 FM) licensed to serve Grand Rapids, Michigan, United States
- World Junior Wushu Championships, an international wushu competition for competitors below 18 years of age
- Women Journalists Without Chains, a group created by Tawakkol Karman, who was awarded the 2011 Nobel Peace Prize
