= WWCC =

WWCC may refer to:

- Government
  - Wagga Wagga City Council a local government area in the Riverina region of south-western New South Wales, Australia.
- Education
  - Walla Walla Community College (WWCC) is a multi-campus community college located in southeastern Washington.
  - Western Wyoming Community College (WWCC) is a two-year college located in Rock Springs, Wyoming.
- Media
  - WWCC-LP (97.3 FM) is a radio station licensed to the Triangle Foundation, based in Lafayette, Indiana.
- Sport
  - Women's World Chess Championship (WWCC), an international chess competition.
  - World Women's Curling Championship, a yearly international curling competition.
- Other
  - Working With Children Check, an Australian background check for employees and volunteers in child-related work.
