= CHGA =

CHGA may refer to:

- CHGA (gene)
- Commission on HIV/AIDS and Governance in Africa
- CHGA-FM, French-language community radio station in Quebec, Canada
