= XHDCC-FM =

San Ildefonso, Tepeji del Río de Ocampo, Hidalgo; Mexico
- Frequency: 97.3 MHz
- Branding: Gi Ne Ga Bu He Tho (We Want to Keep Living)

Programming
- Format: Community/indigenous

Ownership
- Owner: Desarrollo Comunitario y Cultural Ma Nguhe, A.C.

History
- First air date: 2002; August 1, 2006 (with permit)
- Call sign meaning: Desarrollo Comunitario y Cultural

Technical information
- ERP: .2 kW
- Transmitter coordinates: 20°02′01″N 99°20′03″W

XHDCC-FM is a community radio station on 97.3 FM in San Ildefonso, Tepeji del Río de Ocampo, Hidalgo. XHDCC is owned by Desarrollo Comunitario y Cultural Ma Nguhe, A.C. and primarily broadcasts in Hñähñu.

== History ==
The station first went on air with transmitter tests in 2002, but its equipment was seized and the station forced off air. That forced the backers of Desarrollo Comunitario y Cultural Ma Nguhe, A.C. to begin the process of applying for a permit at a time when there were very few permitted community radio stations in Mexico.

On July 29, 2005, Ma Nguhe received the permit for their station, XHDCC-FM; it had to buy a new transmitter to replace the one that was seized, and full programming began August 1, 2006. XHDCC is licensed for operation from 1pm to 10pm each day.
