= XHPGAN-FM =

Radio station in Apatzingán, Michoacán, Mexico

- Apatzingán, Michoacán; Mexico
- Frequency: 99.1 MHz
- Branding: Lokura FM Grupera

Programming
- Format: Regional Mexican

Ownership
- Owner: Capital Media; (Radiodifusoras Capital, S.A. de C.V.)

History
- First air date: September 12, 2020
- Call sign meaning: Last three letters of Apatzingán

Technical information
- Class: AA
- ERP: 6 kW
- HAAT: −59 m (−194 ft)
- Transmitter coordinates: 19°4′48.2″N 102°20′15.2″W

Links
- Webcast: Listen live
- Website: https://www.lokurafm.com/apatzingan

XHPGAN-FM is a radio station on 99.1 FM in Apatzingán, Michoacán. It is owned by Capital Media and known as Lokura FM Grupera, carrying a Regional Mexican format.

== History ==
XHPGAN was awarded in the IFT-4 radio auction of 2017. Tecnoradio had been one of two winning bidders for two stations in the lot (the other was Media FM, which started XHPAPM-FM 100.9), but the company was later disqualified nationwide. The only other bidder on the frequency, Capital Media, had signed up to be eligible to win stations if other bidders were disqualified and came away with the Apatzingán station for 640,000 pesos. The station officially came to air on September 12, 2020.
