= XHCHI-FM =

Radio station in Chihuahua, Chihuahua, Mexico

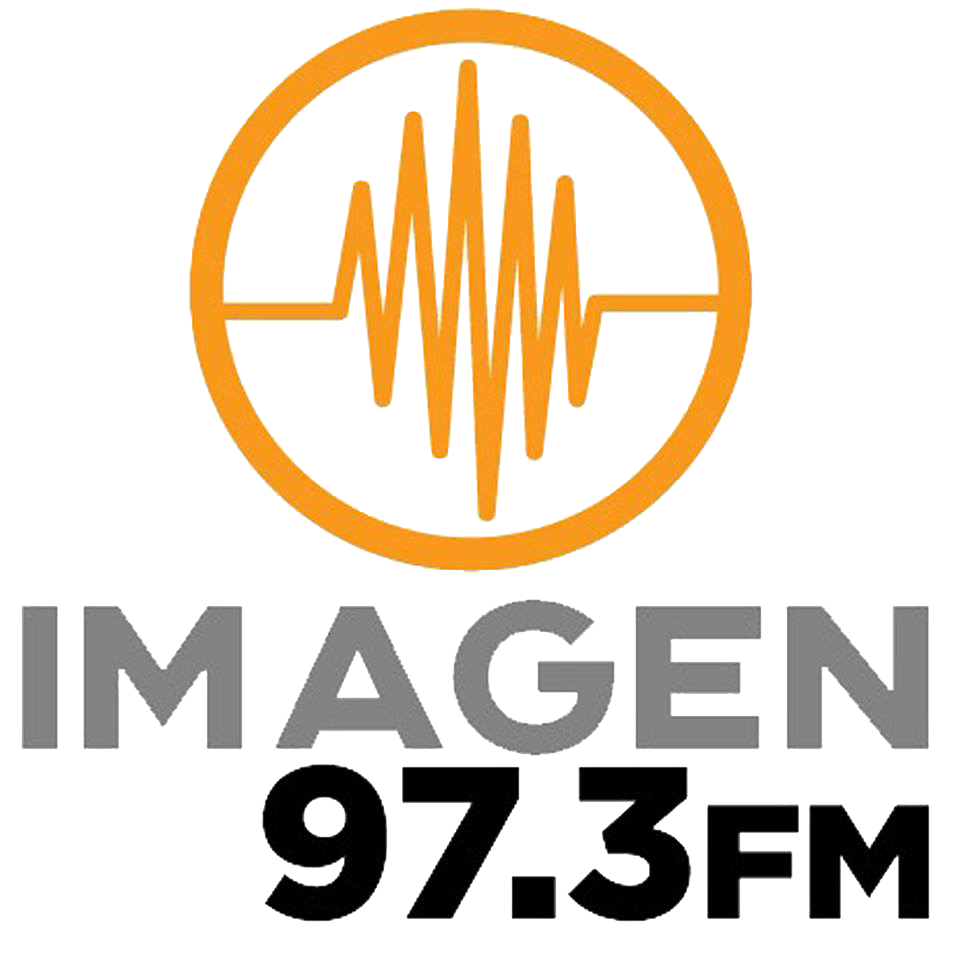
- Chihuahua, Chihuahua; Mexico
- Frequency: 97.3 MHz
- Branding: Imagen Radio

Programming
- Format: News/talk

Ownership
- Owner: Grupo Imagen; (GIM Televisión Nacional, S.A. de C.V.)

History
- First air date: October 1994
- Former call signs: XHECS-FM (1994–2003)
- Call sign meaning: "Chihuahua"

Technical information
- Licensing authority: CRT
- Class: C1
- ERP: 30,000 watts
- HAAT: 327.32 m (1,073.9 ft)

Links
- Webcast: Listen live
- Website: imagenchihuahua.mx

XHCHI-FM is a radio station in Chihuahua, Chihuahua, Mexico. Broadcasting on 97.3 FM, XHCHI is owned by Grupo Imagen and carries the Imagen Radio news/talk format.

== History ==
On June 5, 1992, the Secretariat of Communications and Transportation issued a call for bids to build and operate a 50,000-watt commercial radio station at 97.3 MHz in Encinillas, Chihuahua, in the northern part of Chihuahua Municipality, with call sign XHECS-FM. Nine applications were received, and the SCT selected the bid of José Guadalupe Bernal Vázquez, owner of Corporación Bajío Comunicaciones of Celaya, Guanajuato, in 1994. The concession document was issued in September 1997 for a term beginning in October 1994.

On April 3, 2001, the station was sold to Radio Triunfos, S.A. de C.V., a subsidiary of Multimedios Radio, to become "FM Tú" a pop format similar to that of XHFMTU-FM in Monterrey. On December 10, 2003, it was authorized to change the call sign to XHCHI-FM, making it one of two unrelated stations to bear the call sign along with a station in Nácori Chico. On April 5, 2005, it was authorized to move the transmitter to the town of Nuevo Sacramento, north of the city of Chihuahua, and lower the power to 30 kW, thus placing the capital city in XHCHI-FM's coverage area.

On April 6, 2006, the station and several other Multimedios-owned radio stations in northern Mexico were sold to Grupo Imagen, which resulted in the station flipping to the Imagen Radio news/talk network.
