= XHGF-FM =

Radio station in Gutiérrez Zamora, Veracruz

- Gutiérrez Zamora, Veracruz; Mexico
- Frequency: 97.3 MHz
- RDS: LA LEY
- Branding: La Ley

Programming
- Format: Regional Mexican

Ownership
- Owner: Radio XEGF, S.A.

History
- First air date: June 29, 1961 (concession)

Technical information
- Class: B1
- ERP: 25 kW
- Transmitter coordinates: 20°28′20″N 97°05′35″W

Links
- Website: La Ley 97.3 FM website

XHGF-FM is a radio station on 97.3 FM in Gutiérrez Zamora, Veracruz. It is owned by Radio XEGF, S.A., and carries a Regional Mexican format known as La Ley.

== History ==
XEGF-AM 1420 received its concession on June 29, 1961. It was owned by María Elena Barriga García and broadcast with 500 watts during the day and 100 at night. By the late 1960s, it was owned by Luz María Musset de Castro, who moved it to 1020 kHz by the 1980s. In the 1990s, it was moved to 740 and doubled its daytime power.

XEGF was authorized to migrate to FM in November 2010 as XHGF-FM on 97.3.
