= XHGI-FM =

Radio station in Tamazunchale, San Luis Potosí, Mexico

- Tamazunchale, San Luis Potosí; Mexico
- Frequency: 97.3 FM
- Branding: Radio Reyna

Programming
- Format: Regional Mexican

Ownership
- Owner: Reyna Irazabal y Hermanos, S.A. de C.V.

History
- First air date: July 11, 1988 (concession)

Technical information
- Licensing authority: CRT
- Class: B1
- ERP: 50 kW
- HAAT: −162.5 m (−533 ft)
- Transmitter coordinates: 21°14′16″N 98°45′46″W

Links
- Webcast: Listen live
- Website: radioreynsa.com.mx

XHGI-FM is a radio station on 97.3 FM in Tamazunchale, San Luis Potosí. It is owned by Reyna Irazabal y Hermanos and known as Radio Reyna, carrying a Regional Mexican format.

== History ==
XEGI-AM 1160 received its concession on July 11, 1988. It was owned by Aurora Cárdenas Toral and broadcast as a 500-watt daytimer. Her successors sold XEGI to Luis Antonio Río Castañeda and Luis Antonio, Ernesto, Ricardo and Elisa Ríos Cárdenas. They promptly turned XEGI over to Juan Roberto Reyna López in 2006. Upon his death the next year, Juan Roberto Reyna Irazabal became the concessionaire along with Esteban Javier and Sergio Manuel Reyna Irazabal, Sonia Reyna López and Elsa Irazabal McMillan. These relatives later consolidated the station under a new corporation.

XEGI received approval to migrate to FM in November 2010.
