= XHLP-FM =

Radio station in La Piedad, Michoacán, Mexico

- La Piedad, Michoacán; Mexico
- Frequency: 89.9 MHz
- Branding: Yeah FM

Programming
- Format: Pop

Ownership
- Owner: Guizar Comunicación Integral; (XELP-AM, S.A. de C.V.)
- Sister stations: XHLC-FM

History
- First air date: March 15, 1969 (concession)
- Call sign meaning: La Piedad

Technical information
- ERP: 0.05 kW
- Transmitter coordinates: 20°18′13″N 102°06′53″W

Links
- Webcast: Listen live
- Website: guizarcomunicacion.mx

XHLP-FM is a radio station on 89.9 FM in La Piedad, Michoacán, Mexico. It is owned by Guizar Comunicación Integral and carries a pop format known as "Yeah FM".

== History ==
XELP-AM received its concession on March 15, 1969. It was owned by Olga Ramírez de Fabre and broadcast with 250 watts day and 100 night on 1170 kHz. In 1976, XELP was sold to Ernestina Ayala Tejeda. It moved to 1230 in the 1990s in order to increase power to 1 kW.

XELP received approval to migrate to FM in 2011. The station, long known as Dual Estéreo, began promoting a flip to Exa FM at the end of August 2019.

The Exa FM concept concluded on October 22, 2025, and the station changed name to "Yeah FM" retaining a pop format.
