= XHFN-FM =

Radio station in Uruapan, Michoacán

XEFN-AM, XHFN-FM
- Uruapan, Michoacán; Mexico
- Frequencies: 1130 kHz; 91.1 MHz
- Branding: Candela

Programming
- Format: Regional Mexican

Ownership
- Owner: Cadena RASA; (XEFN, S.A.)

History
- First air date: April 25, 1953 (concession); 1994 (FM)

Technical information
- Power: 1 kW day/0.1 kW night
- ERP: 25 kW

Links
- Website: www.candelauruapan.com

XHFN-FM 91.1/XEFN-AM 1130 is a combo radio station in Uruapan, Michoacán. It is known as Candela with a Regional Mexican format.

== History ==
XEFN received its first concession on April 25, 1953, owned by Guillermo Navarro Quiroz. After Guillermo's death, ownership passed to Esperanza Murguia Vda. de Quiroz, his widow.

In 1994, XEFN became an AM-FM radio combination.
