= KHEL-LP =

- Rogers, Arkansas; United States
- Frequency: 97.3 MHz
- Branding: The Flame

Programming
- Format: Adult Hits

Ownership
- Owner: New Covenant Church In America

Technical information
- Licensing authority: FCC
- Facility ID: 134355
- Class: L1
- ERP: 97 watts
- HAAT: 30 meters (98 feet)
- Transmitter coordinates: 36°20′34.15″N 94°08′12.90″W

Links
- Public license information: LMS
- Webcast: Listen Live
- Website: http://www.khel973.com/

KHEL-LP (97.3 FM, "The Flame") is a radio station licensed to serve Rogers, Arkansas. The station is owned by New Covenant Church In America. It airs an Adult Hits music format.

The station was assigned the KHEL-LP call letters by the Federal Communications Commission on March 23, 2004.
