= WHPW-LP =

- Harpswell, Maine; United States
- Frequency: 97.3 MHz

Programming
- Format: Variety
- Affiliations: Pacifica Radio Network

Ownership
- Owner: Harpswell Radio Project, Inc.

Technical information
- Licensing authority: FCC
- Facility ID: 194127
- Class: L1
- ERP: 26 watts
- HAAT: 51 metres (167 ft)
- Transmitter coordinates: 43°48′3.8″N 69°56′15.1″W

Links
- Public license information: LMS
- Website: www.harpswellradio.org

WHPW-LP (97.3 FM) is a radio station licensed to serve the community of Harpswell, Maine. The station is owned by Harpswell Radio Project, Inc. It airs a variety format.

The station was assigned the WHPW-LP call letters by the Federal Communications Commission on April 22, 2014.
