= KRPA =

Radio station in Oak Harbor, Washington

- Oak Harbor, Washington; United States
- Broadcast area: Whidbey Island
- Frequency: 1110 kHz
- Branding: Radio India

Programming
- Format: Punjabi language music, talk and news

Ownership
- Owner: New Age Media Ltd.
- Sister stations: KWLE

History
- First air date: December 14, 1984
- Former call signs: KEUE (to 1984); KISD (1984–1987); KJTT (1987–2000); KWDB (2000–2012)
- Call sign meaning: Radio Punjabi Asian (former format)

Technical information
- Licensing authority: FCC
- Facility ID: 49918
- Class: B
- Power: 9,000 watts day; 2,500 watts night
- Transmitter coordinates: 48°17′27.00″N 122°42′28.00″W
- Translator: 99.5 K258CW (Oak Harbor)

Links
- Public license information: Public file; LMS
- Webcast: Listen Live
- Website: radioindia.ca

KRPA (1110 AM) is a commercial radio station broadcasting Punjabi language music, talk and news. It previously had an adult contemporary radio format, simulcasting its sister station 1340 KWLE, Anacortes, Washington. Licensed to Oak Harbor, Washington, United States, KRPA is owned by New Age Media Ltd., with studios in Mount Vernon.

The station broadcasts during daytime hours only, to protect clear channel Class A stations KFAB in Omaha, Nebraska and WBT in Charlotte, North Carolina. Programming can be heard around the clock on FM translator 99.5 K258CW.

KRPA had focused on the South Asian community of Greater Vancouver as a rimshotter, although reception in most areas of Greater Vancouver is quite poor. The station's prime coverage area is Whidbey Island and the San Juan Islands, although with a good radio, the signal reaches into Vancouver, as well as Victoria and Seattle.

== History ==
The station went on the air as KEUE, later becoming KISD on July 1, 1984. On June 30, 1987, the station changed its call sign to KJTT, on January 21, 2000 to KWDB and March 14, 2012 to the current KRPA.

As KWDB, the station carried a conservative talk radio format until March 2012, when the station flipped its format to an ethnic format focused on Vancouver's South Asian community, following Satnam Media Group's acquisition of the station from Action Pages, LLC (formerly Impact Directories of Northwest Washington, LLC) in November 2011.

The station was sold by Satnam Media to New Age Media Ltd. at a purchase price of $85,000; this transaction was consummated on July 18, 2014.

After a claim of illegal broadcasting to Canada by the Canadian Radio-television and Telecommunications Commission (CRTC), Radio Punjab ceased its broadcasting on September 23, 2014, only to return to broadcasting in 2019.

KRPA's audio also is relayed over KWLE 1340 kHz in Anacortes, Washington.
