= WBLB =

Radio station in Pulaski, Virginia

- Pulaski, Virginia; United States
- Broadcast area: Pulaski, Virginia; Pulaski County, Virginia
- Frequency: 1340 kHz
- Branding: Family 1340

Programming
- Format: Southern Gospel; Black Gospel

Ownership
- Owner: WBLB, Inc.

History
- First air date: May 8, 1973

Technical information
- Licensing authority: FCC
- Facility ID: 48921
- Class: C
- Power: 1,000 watts (unlimited)
- Transmitter coordinates: 37°3′57.0″N 80°47′3.0″W
- Translator: 107.5 W298CY (Pulaski)

Links
- Public license information: Public file; LMS
- Webcast: Listen live
- Website: WBLB Online

WBLB is a Southern Gospel and Black Gospel formatted broadcast radio station licensed to Pulaski, Virginia, serving Pulaski and Pulaski County, Virginia. WBLB is owned and operated by WBLB, Inc.
