= WJYK =

- Chase City, Virginia; United States
- Broadcast area: Chase City, Virginia; Northern Mecklenburg County, Virginia
- Frequency: 980 kHz
- Branding: Joy AM 980

Programming
- Format: Contemporary Christian; Religious

Ownership
- Owner: Battaglia Communications, Inc.; (Stephen C. Battaglia, Sr. & Janis G. Battaglia)

History
- First air date: January 18, 1959
- Former call signs: WMEK (?–2003); DWMEK (2003–2003); WMEK (2003–2006)
- Call sign meaning: "Worship Jesus Your King"

Technical information
- Licensing authority: FCC
- Facility ID: 71627
- Class: D
- Power: 1,000 watts (day); 26 watts (night)
- Transmitter coordinates: 36°48′19.0″N 78°26′25.0″W
- Translator: 99.3 W257EL (Chase City)

Links
- Public license information: Public file; LMS
- Webcast: Listen live
- Website: wjykradio.com

WJYK is a Contemporary Christian and Religious formatted broadcast radio station licensed to Chase City, Virginia, serving Chase City and Northern Mecklenburg County, Virginia. WJYK is owned and operated by Battaglia Communications, Inc.
