= XHGT-FM =

Radio station in Zamora, Michoacán, Mexico

- Zamora, Michoacán; Mexico
- Frequency: 94.1 FM
- Branding: Candela

Programming
- Format: Regional Mexican
- Affiliations: Cadena RASA

Ownership
- Owner: Grupo Radio Zamora; (Radio Zamora, S. de R.L.)
- Sister stations: XHZN-FM, XHQL-FM, XHEZM-FM

History
- First air date: January 26, 1956 (concession)

Technical information
- ERP: 6 kW
- Transmitter coordinates: 19°58′01″N 102°15′55″W

Links
- Webcast: Listen live
- Website: cadenarasa.com

XHGT-FM is a radio station on 94.1 FM in Zamora, Michoacán, Mexico. It is owned by Grupo Radio Zamora and is known as Candela.

== History ==
XEGT-AM received its concession on January 26, 1956. It was owned by Fernando Jiménez Torres until 1964 and broadcast with 1,000 watts on 1490 kHz. In the early 2000s, power was raised to 5 kW day.

XEGT received approval to migrate to FM in 2011.
