= WROD =

- Port Orange, Florida; United States
- Frequency: 1340 kHz
- Branding: 95.1 WROD Daytona's Talk Radio

Programming
- Format: Conservative talk

Ownership
- Owner: Duvall Media Group LLC

History
- First air date: November 7, 1947
- Call sign meaning: Hot rod (associated with previous oldies format)

Technical information
- Licensing authority: FCC
- Facility ID: 36169
- Class: C
- Power: 1,000 watts unlimited
- Transmitter coordinates: 29°9′15.9″N 81°1′19.6″W
- Translator: 95.1 W236DY (Daytona Beach)

Links
- Public license information: Public file; LMS
- Webcast: Listen live
- Website: daytonatalkradio.com

WROD (1340 kHz) is a commercial radio station in Port Orange, Florida, and broadcasting a conservative talk radio format. As of June 24, 2015, WROD is owned by Duvall Media Group LLC.

WROD is a Class C radio station transmitting with 1,000 watts, using a non-directional antenna. Programming is also heard on 120-watt FM translator 95.1 W236DY in Daytona Beach. It uses the FM frequency in its moniker, "95.1 WROD Daytona's Talk Radio".

== History ==
On November 7, 1947, with 250 watts of power, WROD went on the air as Daytona Beach's third radio station. By 1961, WROD was licensed to operate with 1,000 watts of power during the day. It was owned and operated by Frank Ward in 1981. Featuring Doug Montgomery morning show, Rick Jewel mid-days and Brian F. Mitchell overnights with the Music of Your Life format. The radio station operated from its transmitter site from its beginning to 2005, when its offices moved to 100 Marina Point Drive in Daytona Beach. Later in 2015, after being bought by Miracle Media, the offices moved to 106 Ivy Lane Daytona Beach while the studios found their home at 242 South Beach Street, Daytona Beach.

FM translator W284AV 104.7 went on the air in July 2012 simulcasting WROD. The station flipped from oldies to classic rock at midnight on January 1, 2015. On May 26, 2025, WROD switched to conservative talk.
