= WBRJ-LP =

- Baton Rouge, Louisiana; United States
- Broadcast area: Baton Rouge area
- Frequency: 97.3 MHz

Programming
- Format: Christian contemporary

Ownership
- Owner: Jefferson Baptist Church, Inc.

Technical information
- Licensing authority: FCC
- Facility ID: 124170
- Class: L1
- ERP: 95 watts
- HAAT: 30.5 meters (100 ft)
- Transmitter coordinates: 30°24′59.00″N 91°5′3.00″W

Links
- Public license information: LMS

WBRJ-LP (97.3 FM) is a radio station broadcasting a Christian contemporary music format. Licensed to Baton Rouge, Louisiana, United States, the station serves the Baton Rouge area. The station is currently owned by Jefferson Baptist Church, Inc. The station's motto is "The Word from Baton Rouge". The station's listening area extends from Port Allen to Denham Springs and from Prairieville to Hooper Road in Baton Rouge. Until sometime in 2010, the station was on 105.7.
