= KDNZ (FM) =

- Pecos, Texas; United States
- Frequency: 97.3 MHz
- Branding: Pecos 97.3 KDNZ-FM

Programming
- Format: Classic Country
- Affiliations: American Cowboy Radio; Texas Tech Red Raiders football and men's basketball

History
- Former call signs: KKLY (1996–2004); KIOL (2004–2005); KKLY (2005); KGEE (2005–2018)

Technical information
- Licensing authority: FCC
- Facility ID: 76852
- Class: A
- ERP: 100 watts
- HAAT: 21.4 metres (70 ft)
- Transmitter coordinates: 31°25′7″N 103°30′58″W

Links
- Public license information: Public file; LMS
- Webcast: Listen Live

KDNZ (97.3 FM) is a radio station licensed to serve the community of Pecos, Texas. The station is owned by. It airs a classic country format.

The station was assigned the call sign KKLY by the Federal Communications Commission on October 25, 1996. The station changed its call sign to KIOL on December 7, 2004, back to KKLY on January 26, 2005, to KGEE on September 21, 2005, and to KDNZ on February 19, 2018. As of December 31, 2019 KDNZ is an affiliate of the American Cowboy Radio Network and airs Texas Tech Red Raiders football and men's basketball games.
