= Sistema Michoacano de Radio y Televisión =

Public broadcaster of the Mexican state of Michoacán

Coordinates: 19.6779°N 101.1896°W

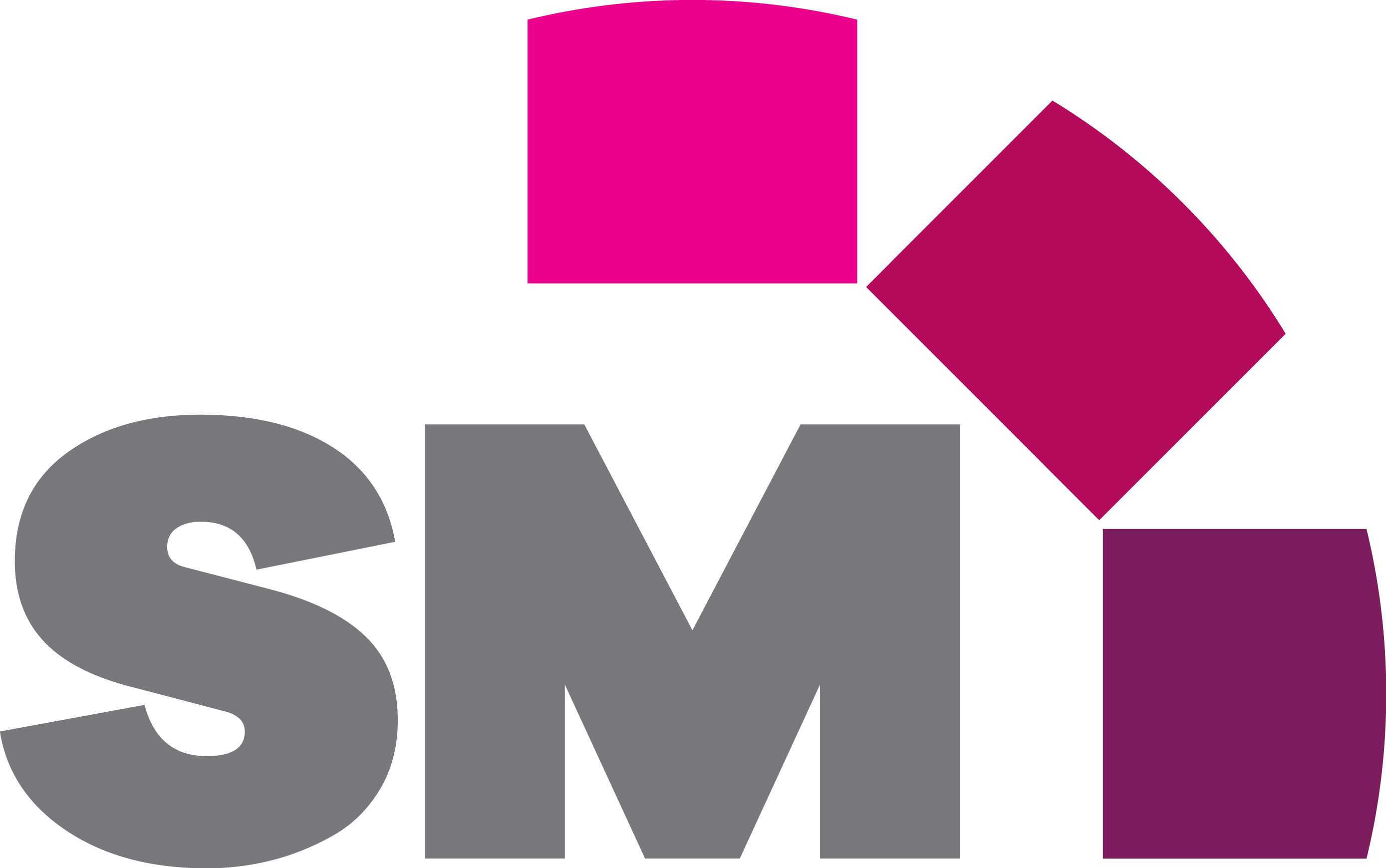

The Sistema Michoacano de Radio y Televisión (Michoacán State Radio and Television System or SMRTV) is the public broadcaster of the Mexican state of Michoacán. It includes statewide FM and TV networks, as well as an AM radio station in the state capital of Morelia. SMRTV's programming primarily consists of scientific, cultural and educational content, along with news and sports coverage.

== Television ==
=== Programming ===
SMRTV's television network includes its own productions as well as programs from other public broadcasters, such as Canal Once's Once Noticias. Canal 22 and Deutsche Welle are also among SMRTV's major program suppliers.

SMRTV also produces two daily editions of "SM Noticias", which are carried on AM, FM, and TV.

=== Transmitters ===
SMRTV uses a network of terrestrial television transmitters to provide statewide coverage.

RF	VC	Call sign	Location	ERP
26	16	XHAPA-TDT	Apatzingán	.151 kW
34	16	XHMHG-TDT	Ciudad Hidalgo	.114 kW
11	16	XHPBHU-TDT	Huetamo	
21	16	XHMJI-TDT	Jiquilpan	.226 kW
51	16	XHPMG-TDT	La Piedad	.146 kW
29	16	XHLAM-TDT	Lazaro Cárdenas	.151 kW
49	16	XHMOR-TDT	Morelia	2.951 kW
34	16	XHMPU-TDT	Puruandiro	.114 kW
34	16	XHMTC-TDT	Tacámbaro	.114 kW
34	16	XHURU-TDT	Uruapan	.147 kW
34	16	XHMZA-TDT	Zacapu	.114 kW
34	16	XHTZA-TDT	Zamora	.295 kW
22	16	XHMZI-TDT	Zitácuaro	.113 kW

While all stations hold authorizations for digital television, none were on the air as of late 2015; several stations reduced power in order to qualify for an extension of one year to build digital facilities. SMRTV digital transmitters use virtual channel 16.

The Huetamo transmitter was authorized in January 2017.

In March 2018, in order to facilitate the repacking of TV services out of the 600 MHz band (channels 38-51), XHPMG (22) and XHMOR (14) were assigned new channels for continued digital operations.

== FM radio ==
The state FM network is headed by XHREL-FM 106.9 in Morelia. Its program schedule is largely musical, with the exception of SMRTV news programs and one program from MVS Radio.

=== Transmitters ===
12 transmitters offer statewide FM service.

Callsign	Frequency	City	ERP
XHREL-FM	88.5	Morelia	3 kW
XHDEN-FM	94.7	Lázaro Cárdenas	3 kW
XHTZI-FM	97.5	Apatzingán	3 kW
XHRUA-FM	99.7	Uruapan	3 kW
XHZMA-FM	103.1	Zamora de Hidalgo	3 kW
XHDAD-FM	88.7	La Piedad	.347 kW
XHZIT-FM	103.1	Zitácuaro	3 kW
XHJIQ-FM	95.7	Jiquilpan	3 kW
XHHID-FM	99.7	Ciudad Hidalgo	3 kW
XHAMB-FM	95.9	Tacámbaro	3 kW
XHAND-FM	104.9	Puruándiro	3 kW
XHCAP-FM	96.9	Zacapu	3 kW

== AM radio ==
XEREL-AM 1550 in Morelia broadcasts an alternate program schedule to FM, with agricultural news, programs directed at the Morelia area and some music. The station operates with one kilowatt of power.
