= XHCR-FM =

Radio station in Morelia, Michoacán, Mexico

XECR-AM/XHCR-FM
- Morelia, Michoacán; Mexico
- Frequencies: 1340 kHz; 96.3 MHz
- Branding: La Z

Programming
- Format: Regional Mexican
- Affiliations: Grupo Radio Centro

Ownership
- Owner: Grupo TRENU; (Radio Tremor Morelia, S.A. de C.V.)

History
- First air date: June 23, 1954 (concession); 1994 (FM)

Technical information
- Class: B1 (FM)
- Power: 1 kW
- ERP: 25 kW
- HAAT: 95.91 m
- Transmitter coordinates: 19°38′51.8″N 101°11′16.7″W

Links
- Webcast: Listen live
- Website: lazetanoticias.com

XHCR-FM 96.3/XECR-AM 1340 is a combo radio station in Morelia, Michoacán. It is owned by Grupo TRENU and carries a Regional Mexican format known as La Z.

== History ==
XECR received its concession on June 23, 1954. It was owned by J. Manuel Treviño Morfin — the namesake of its concessionaire. Grupo TRENU is named for the Treviño Núñez family.
