= XHSCCI-FM =

Community radio station in Pedernales, Michoacán, Mexico

Pedernales, Tacámbaro, Michoacán; Mexico
- Frequency: 105.7 FM
- Branding: Radio Pedernales

Programming
- Format: Community radio

Ownership
- Owner: Comunicación para el Desarrollo Social de la Comunidad de Pedernales, A.C.

History
- First air date: 2019 (on frequency)
- Former frequencies: 93.3 FM (as a pirate)
- Call sign meaning: (templated call sign)

Technical information
- Class: A
- ERP: 3 kW
- HAAT: −311 m (−1,020 ft)
- Transmitter coordinates: 19°08′32.8″N 101°27′57.2″W

Links
- Website: XHSCCI-FM on Facebook

XHSCCI-FM is a community radio station on 105.7 FM in Pedernales, a community in the municipality of Tacámbaro, Michoacán, Mexico. The station is owned by the civil association Comunicación para el Desarrollo Social de la Comunidad de Pedernales, A.C.

== History ==
Comunicación para el Desarrollo Social de la Comunidad de Pedernales filed for a community station on May 12, 2016. The station was awarded on February 20, 2019. Radio Pedernales had been operating as a pirate station on 93.3 FM.
