= Radio GTMO =

US radio station at Naval Station Guantanamo Bay

Coordinates: 19.9195°N 75.1472°W

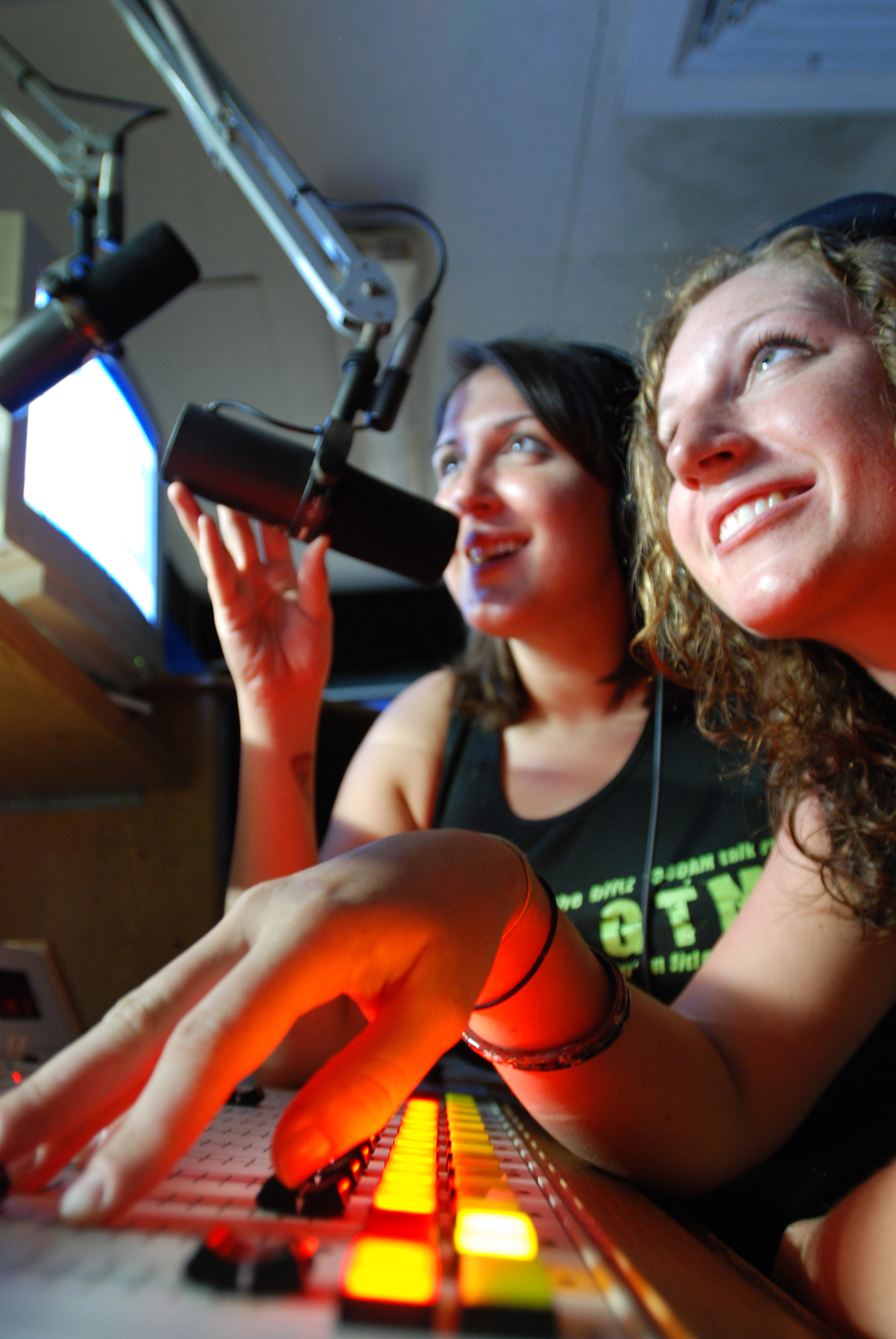
Two US Army specialists host a show at Radio GTMO in 2008

Radio GTMO, officially titled AFN Guantanamo Bay, is the United States military radio station at Guantanamo Bay Naval Base (GTMO), in Cuba. Operated locally by Mass Communication and Interior Communications Electrician sailors of the U.S. Navy assigned to the American Forces Network Europe, the station serves approximately 6,000 American service personnel and their families stationed at the military base. Three different radio programs are broadcast simultaneously, carried on one AM frequency and two FM, but the transmitters situated at 19.941530 N 75.115691 W are only strong enough to cover the base, and are not heard in the rest of Cuba. The station is known for its collection of 22,000 vinyl records and reel-to-reel tapes, kept in place despite orders to the contrary.

== History and mission ==
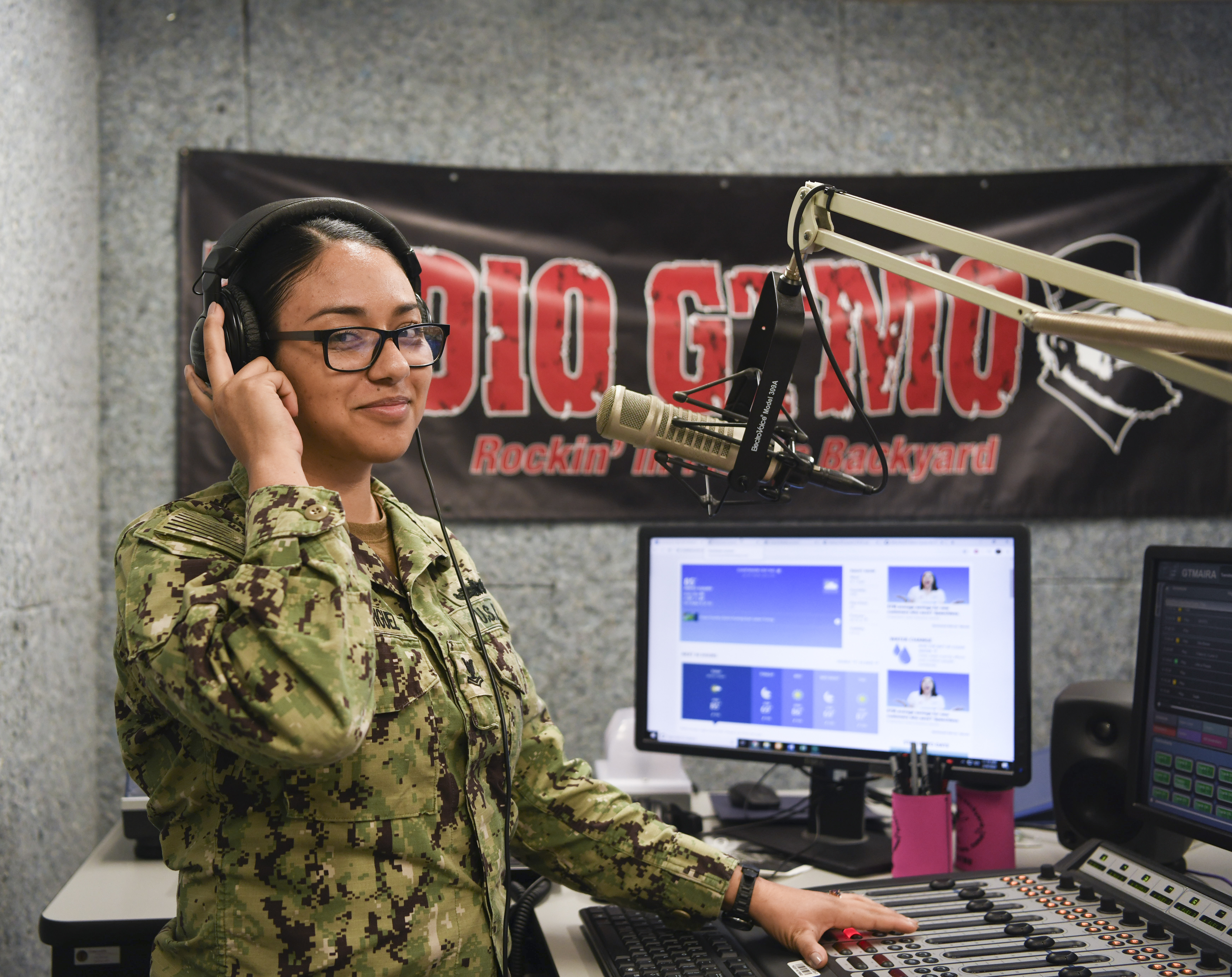
The station is run by mass communication specialists such as Anaid Banuelos-Rodriguez in 2020

American military radio has been in operation in Cuba since 1940. The first AFN radio station in Cuba, the precursor to Radio GTMO, was WGBY in 1947, broadcasting from a different location. Radio GTMO moved to its current building in 1964.

The mission of the radio station is to entertain and inform the Americans who are stationed at the base. The radio signals transmit throughout the base but they are not strong enough to reach other parts of Cuba, which means that Radio GTMO is not used for US propaganda aimed at Cubans. That specific mission is carried instead by Radio y Televisión Martí based in Miami, operating under the umbrella of the U.S. Agency for Global Media, part of the executive branch of the US government.

Radio GTMO broadcasts a mix of news and various talk radio programs selected from the continental US on the AM frequency 1340 kHz. AM listeners can hear NPR, Fox News, ABC News and other American talk shows. Top 40, modern urban music, classic rock and base information announcements are broadcast on the FM band on 102.1 MHz, and country music on 103.1 MHz. Most of the music heard on the air is from digital audio sources, but the vinyl titles may be played on special occasions. The unofficial radio station tag line is "Rockin' in Fidel's Backyard."

== Collection of vinyl and tape ==
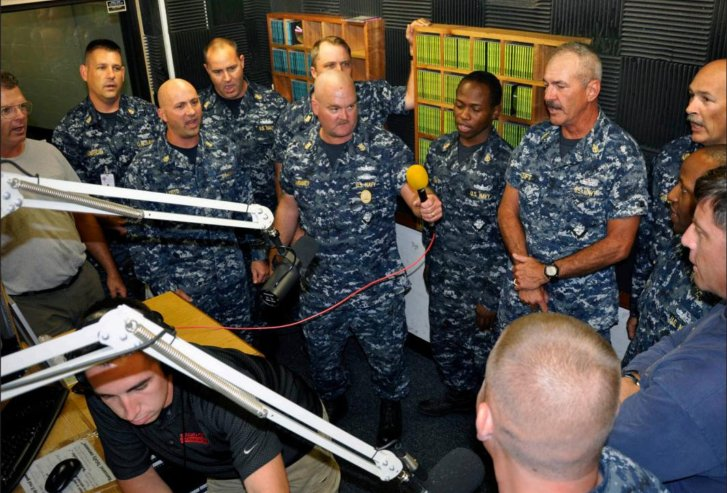
US Navy petty officers sing "Anchors Aweigh" in 2012 for a fund-raising drive.

The large collection of records and tapes at Radio GTMO was amassed from the 1940s to the 1990s. Most have labels stating they are special Armed Forces issue, not the common retail product. Every item is indexed in a card catalog. Estimates of the value of the collection vary from a speculative $3 million down to $1 million, but many of the titles cannot be sold because they are government property, released by the various record companies to the US military only for radio broadcast, with resale not allowed. A 2007 estimate by AFN concluded that $2 million might be collected if each title could be auctioned online, at an average price of about $100, but for most of the titles there is no method of legal sale.

The collection is unique; it is the only intact, active record collection in the US Department of Defense. In the 1990s when the US military transitioned to digital audio, AFN ordered its stations to destroy their vinyl record collections or turn them in to the AFN Broadcast Center in Riverside, California. The Riverside office placed a full set of vinyl records in long-term storage, and sent another complete set to the Library of Congress. Stations were also allowed to keep some analog recordings and playback equipment for historical purposes. While the various AFN stations were clearing their shelves of vinyl, Radio GTMO ignored the order and kept their collection. Another attempt by civilian staffers with no authority at the Defense Media Activity to have the collection destroyed in 2022 was likewise ignored and thwarted by AFN Europe and AFN Headquarters leadership. The collection may eventually end up in a museum, but for now is safe and secure inside Radio GTMO.
