= KWLE =

- Anacortes, Washington; United States
- Broadcast area: Skagit County
- Frequency: 1340 kHz
- Branding: Radio Punjab

Programming
- Format: Punjabi music, talk and news

Ownership
- Owner: New Age Media Ltd.
- Sister stations: KRPA

History
- Former call signs: KAGT, KLKI

Technical information
- Licensing authority: FCC
- Facility ID: 29237
- Class: C
- Power: 1,000 watts
- Transmitter coordinates: 48°29′44″N 122°36′15″W
- Translator: (101.9 MHz) K270CL (Bellingham)

Links
- Public license information: Public file; LMS
- Website: Official website

KWLE (1340 AM) is a radio station carries Punjabi music talk and news. Previously carry Adult contemporary music format. Licensed to Anacortes, Washington, United States, it serves the Skagit County, Washington area. The station is currently owned by New Age Media Ltd.

They also broadcast local Anacortes sporting events. It is mostly heard in the Skagit County area.

KWLE was formerly KLKI, playing standards similar to Seattle station KIXI. The format change in December 2007 angered many loyal listeners, who complained that they no longer had a local outlet to hear "Standards".

The station is also simulcast on KRPA Oak Harbor, Washington.
