= WAML (AM) =

- Collins, Mississippi; United States
- Broadcast area: Hattiesburg, Mississippi
- Frequency: 1340 kHz

Programming
- Format: Gospel

Ownership
- Owner: Charles Tillman; (Tillman Broadcasting Network, Inc.)
- Sister stations: WCHJ

History
- First air date: August 15, 1927
- Former call signs: KGGH (1927-1929); KTSL (1929-1931); WTSL (1931-1933)
- Call sign meaning: W AM (radio) Laurel

Technical information
- Licensing authority: FCC
- Facility ID: 52617
- Class: C
- Power: 1,000 watts
- Transmitter coordinates: 31°38′04.60″N 89°34′23.30″W
- Translators: W236DD (95.1 MHz, Collins)

Links
- Public license information: Public file; LMS

WAML (1340 AM) is an American radio station that is licensed to serve the community of Collins, Mississippi. WAML operates with a licensed power of 1,000 Watts. WAML airs a gospel format that can also be heard on FM translator W236DD 95.1 MHz. Both are owned by Charles Tillman, through licensee Tillman Broadcasting Network, Inc.

== History ==
WAML went on the air on August 15, 1927 as KGGH in Cedar Grove (Shreveport), Louisiana, broadcasting at 1410 kHz. Some years later, the station went to 1340 kHz in Laurel, Mississippi. It was Laurel's first radio station. WAML was a country music, Top 40, easy listening, big band, oldies and gospel music station over its lifetime. In the early 1980s, the station's management elected to fully automate WAML along with a sister FM station, WEEZ which played easy listening and soft rock until WEEZ was sold in the 1990s. WAML was an affiliate of the Ole Miss Radio Network, broadcasting football and basketball games of the University of Mississippi. In addition, they broadcast Laurel High School football games. They were also an NBC radio affiliate at one time. WAML has had numerous owners and format changes since.
