= XHUF-FM =

Radio station in Uruapan, Michoacán

XHUF-FM/XEUF-AM
- Uruapan, Michoacán; Mexico
- Frequency: 100.5 FM/610 AM
- Branding: StereoMía

Programming
- Format: Regional Mexican

Ownership
- Owner: Grupo TRENU; (XEUF, S.A.)

History
- First air date: August 13, 1941 (concession)
- Former frequencies: 92.5 MHz (1994–2006)

Technical information
- Class: B1 (FM)
- Power: 5 kW day 1 kW night
- ERP: 25 kW
- HAAT: -49.9 m
- Transmitter coordinates: (FM) 19°25′57.42″N 102°03′42.29″W

XHUF-FM/XEUF-AM is a combo radio station on 100.5 FM and 610 AM in Uruapan, Michoacán. It is owned by Grupo TRENU and is known as StereoMía, carrying a Regional Mexican format.

== History ==
XEUF received its concession on August 13, 1941. It was owned by Ignacio Navarro and initially broadcast with 350 watts on 550 kHz before moving to its present power levels on 610. Esperanza Murguia Vda. de Navarro, Ignacio's widow, took control of the station in 1969, and in 1981, control was transferred to a corporation. 1994 saw the addition of an FM station, originally on 92.5 MHz until 2006 when it was moved to the current frequency.

In August 2015, the owner of XEUF-XHU, Juan Luis Treviño Núñez died in a plane crash in Uruapan.

On January 18, 2018, the IFT authorized a relocation of XHUF-FM's transmitter, although the new location remains uncertain.
