= KVGC =

- Jackson, California; United States
- Frequency: 1340 kHz
- Branding: KVGC 96.5 FM - 1340 AM

Programming
- Format: Classic hits and full-service

Ownership
- Owner: Mother Lode Broadcasting

History
- First air date: 2011
- Call sign meaning: Voice of the Gold Country

Technical information
- Licensing authority: FCC
- Facility ID: 160449
- Class: C
- Power: 440 watts (day); 250 watts (night)
- Transmitter coordinates: 38°21′20.7″N 120°46′11.8″W
- Translator: 96.5 K243CH (Jackson)

Links
- Public license information: Public file; LMS
- Webcast: Listen live
- Website: kvgcradio.com

KVGC (1340 AM) is a radio station licensed to Jackson, California, United States. The station broadcasts a full-service format airing classic hits music and is owned by Mother Lode Broadcasting.
