= WKLY =

Radio station in Hartwell, Georgia

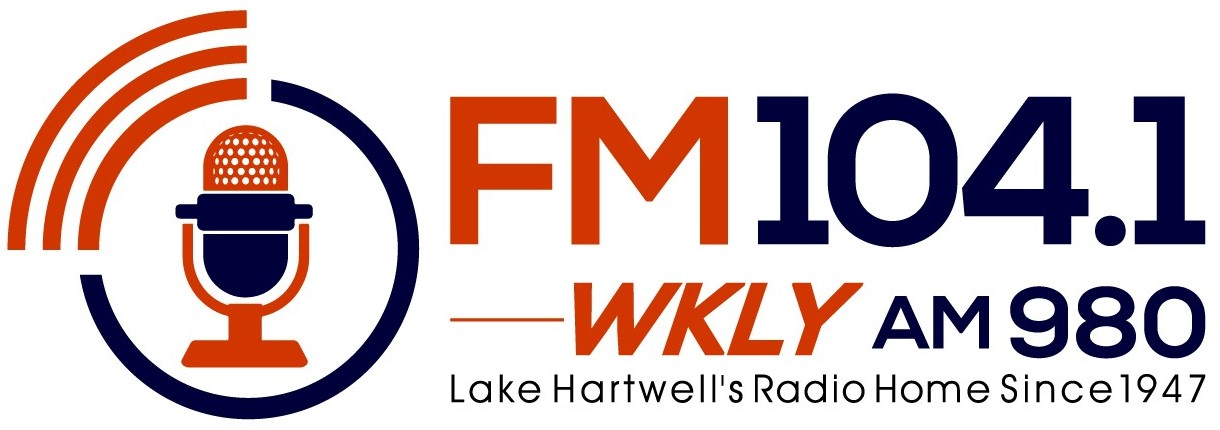
- Hartwell, Georgia; United States
- Frequencies: 104.1 MHz & 980 kHz
- Branding: Real Country FM 104.1 & AM 980

Programming
- Format: Country
- Affiliations: ABC Radio, Westwood One

Ownership
- Owner: Bryan and Bruce Hicks; (Bryan Hicks & Bruce Hicks, Partners dba WKLY Broadcasting Company)
- Sister stations: FM104.1 WKLY

History
- First air date: September 5, 1947

Technical information
- Licensing authority: FCC
- Facility ID: 30043
- Class: D
- Power: 1,000 watts day 149 watts night
- Transmitter coordinates: 34°21′28.00″N 82°58′35.00″W
- Translator: 104.1 W281BS (Hartwell)

Links
- Public license information: Public file; LMS
- Website: wklyradio.com

WKLY (FM104.1 & 980 AM) is a radio station broadcasting a country music format. It is licensed to Hartwell, Georgia, United States. The station is owned by Bryan and Bruce Hicks and features programming from ABC Radio and Westwood One. It is the home of Hart County High School Sports and University of Georgia sports. Some of the morning show programming includes, the WKLY sports wrap show as well as the Swap Shop. WKLY also airs Contemporary Christian Music at night and an all gospel Sunday featuring southern gospel. The morning show anchor is Mike Atkins, he has been with the station for more than 30 years. Listeners can also hear the Dave Ramsey Show weeknights at 7:06.
