= WITY =

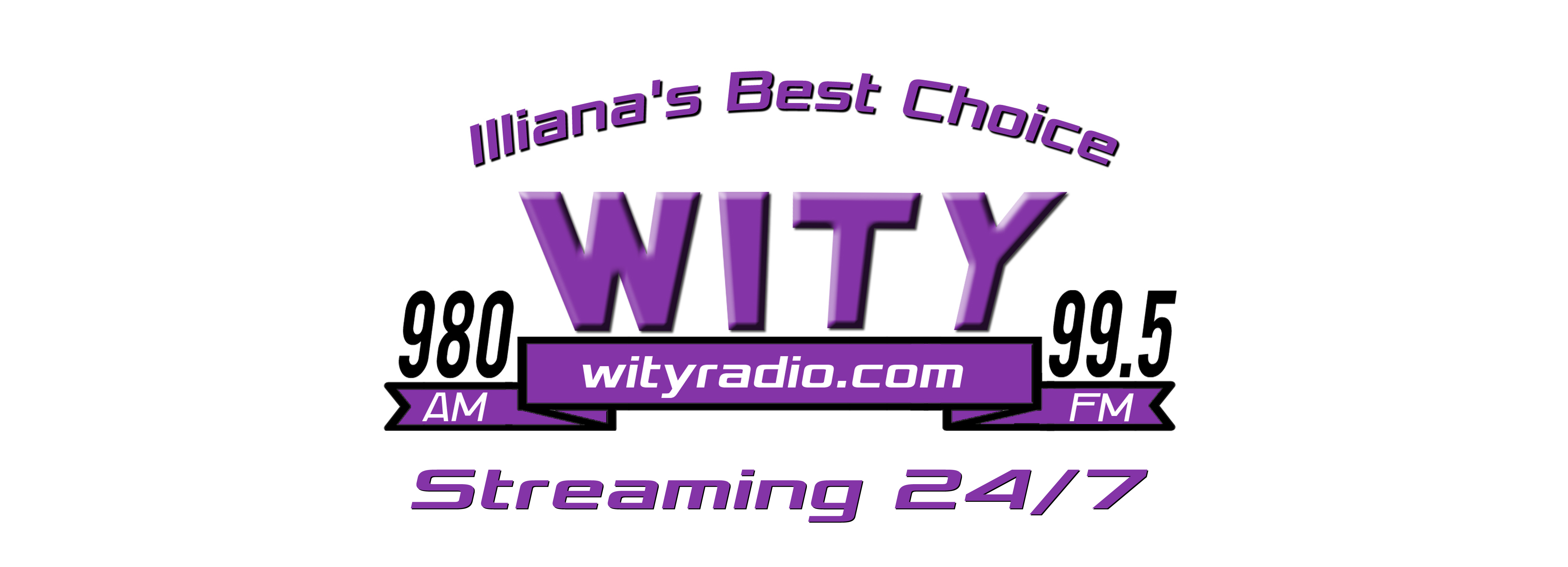
- Danville, Illinois; United States
- Frequency: 980 kHz
- Branding: 980 WITY

Programming
- Format: Adult hits, farm
- Affiliations: ABC News Radio; RFD Illinois

Ownership
- Owner: Illiana Media LLC; (Illiana Media LLC)

History
- First air date: November 24, 1953

Technical information
- Licensing authority: FCC
- Facility ID: 69935
- Class: B
- Power: 1,000 watts (unlimited)
- Transmitter coordinates: 40°4′41.1″N 87°38′20.1″W
- Translator: 99.5 W258CY (Danville)

Links
- Public license information: Public file; LMS
- Webcast: Listen live
- Website: wityradio.com

WITY (980 AM) is a radio station licensed to Danville, Illinois, United States, which began broadcasting in 1953. Owned by Illiana Media LLC, it features an adult hits format with daily farm programming. Coverage extends west from Danville, Illinois, to Champaign-Urbana, North to Kankakee, South to Charleston-Mattoon, and East to Crawfordsville, Indiana.

== History ==
November 24, 1953, saw the advent of WITY on the airwaves. The station was one of three sister stations owned in conjunction by Louis Metzlaff, John Axe, and Gil Metzger. The sister stations were WITE in Brazil, Indiana, and WITZ in Jasper, Indiana; however, WITY is now independently owned and operated locally.
