= XHEZM-FM =

Radio station in Zamora, Michoacán

Zamora, Michoacán; Mexico
- Frequency: 103.9 FM
- Branding: La Zamorana

Programming
- Format: Spanish oldies
- Affiliations: Cadena RASA

Ownership
- Owner: Grupo Radio Zamora; (La Voz del Comercio de Zamora, S. de R.L.)
- Sister stations: XHZN-FM, XHQL-FM, XHGT-FM

History
- First air date: June 30, 1948 (concession)
- Call sign meaning: Zamora

Technical information
- ERP: 6 kW
- Transmitter coordinates: 19°58′01″N 102°15′55″W

Links
- Website: www.radiozamora.com.mx/xhezm.html

XHEZM-FM is a radio station on 103.9 FM in Zamora, Michoacán. It is owned by Grupo Radio Zamora and is known as La Zamorana with a Spanish oldies format.

== History ==
XEZM-AM 650 received its concession on June 30, 1948. It broadcast with 5 kW day and added nighttime broadcasts at 1 kW in the 1990s. It migrated to FM in 2011.
