= XHORE-FM =

Radio station in Morelia, Michoacán, Mexico

- Morelia, Michoacán; Mexico
- Frequency: 97.3 MHz
- Branding: Lokura FM Pop

Programming
- Format: Pop

Ownership
- Owner: Capital Media; (Fundación Radiodifusoras Capital, A.C.)

History
- First air date: July 10, 2013 (permit)
- Call sign meaning: From "Morelia"

Technical information
- Class: A
- ERP: 1 kW

Links
- Website: www.lokura.fm/morelia/

XHORE-FM is a noncommercial radio station in Morelia, Michoacán, Mexico, broadcasting on 97.3 FM. XHORE is owned by Fundación Radiodifusoras Capital, A.C., a subsidiary of Capital Media, and broadcasts its Lokura FM Pop format.

== History ==
XHORE received its permit on July 10, 2013. The station initially signed on with an English classic hits format using the Capital FM brand. On August 5, 2019, it changed to grupera in the Capital Máxima network, then to La Romántica on January 30, 2020. The Lokura FM name was adopted in June 2020 as part of a group-wide rollout. Lokura FM was split into rock, pop, and grupera brands in 2023, with the pop format being installed at XHORE.

It is the only radio station owned by this foundation, though CapitalMedia also operates three social FM stations under the name Gaia FM, A.C.
