= XHLQ-FM =

Radio station in Morelia, Michoacán, Mexico

XHLQ-FM / XELQ-AM
- Morelia, Michoacán; Mexico
- Frequency: 90.1 FM / 570 AM
- Branding: Candela

Programming
- Format: Regional Mexican

Ownership
- Owner: Cadena RASA; (Laris Hermanos, S.A.)
- Sister stations: XHLY-FM, XHATM-FM

History
- First air date: 1941

Technical information
- ERP: 25 kW
- Transmitter coordinates: 19°41′58″N 101°08′30″W

Links
- Webcast: Listen live
- Website: cadenarasa.com

XHLQ-FM/XELQ-AM is a radio station on 90.1 FM and 570 AM in Morelia, Michoacán. It is owned by Cadena RASA and carries its Candela Regional Mexican format.

== History ==
XELQ-AM started broadcasting on 1270 kHz in 1941. It was moved to 570 and received its concession on November 11, 1952.

XELQ was cleared to migrate to FM in 2012, but it was required to maintain its AM station, as communities could lose radio service were the AM station to go off the air.
