= KVOT =

Radio station in Taos, New Mexico

Coordinates: 36°23′22″N 105°35′09″W

- Taos, New Mexico; United States
- Frequency: 1340 kHz
- Branding: The Voice of Truth 1340 AM - 98.1 FM

Programming
- Format: Christian Contemporary music

Ownership
- Owner: Lorene Cino Gonzalez and Christopher Munoz; (L.M.N.O.C. Broadcasting LLC)

Technical information
- Licensing authority: FCC
- Facility ID: 137840
- Class: C
- Power: 1,000 watts

Links
- Public license information: Public file; LMS
- Website: Official website

KVOT (1340 AM) is a radio station broadcasting a Christian Contemporary radio format. The station, located in Taos, New Mexico, is owned by L.M.N.O.C. Broadcasting LLC.

== FM Translator ==
In addition to the main AM frequency, KVOT also broadcasts on an FM translator in order to provide improved coverage. It also provides the listener the ability to listen on the FM band with its improved fidelity.

Broadcast translator for KVOT
Call sign	Frequency	City of license	FID	ERP (W)	Class	FCC info
K251CJ	98.1 FM	Taos, New Mexico	201267	250	D	LMS
