= KSMO (AM) =

- Salem, Missouri; United States
- Frequency: 1340 kHz
- Branding: KSMO Radio AM 1340

Programming
- Format: Country music

Ownership
- Owner: KSMO Enterprises

History
- First air date: November 1953
- Call sign meaning: Salem, Missouri

Technical information
- Licensing authority: FCC
- Facility ID: 35610
- Class: C
- Power: 1,000 watts
- Transmitter coordinates: 37°37′32″N 91°32′05″W
- Translator: 95.7 K239CU (Salem)

Links
- Public license information: Public file; LMS
- Website: radioksmo.com

KSMO is a radio station airing a country music format licensed to Salem, Missouri, broadcasting on 1340 AM and relayed over low-power FM translator K239CU (95.7 FM). The station is owned by KSMO Enterprises.
