= XHSCAL-FM =

Radio station in Contepec, Michoacán

Contepec, Michoacán; Mexico
- Frequency: 106.7 FM
- Branding: La Monarca de Contepec

Programming
- Format: Community radio

Ownership
- Owner: La Monarca de Contepec, A.C.

History
- First air date: November 2018
- Call sign meaning: (templated callsign)

Technical information
- Class: A

XHSCAL-FM is a community radio station broadcasting to Contepec, Michoacán on 106.7 FM. It is known as La Monarca de Contepec and owned by La Monarca de Contepec, A.C.

== History ==
La Monarca de Contepec filed for a station on October 10, 2016. The concession was received on September 19, 2018, and tests on the frequency began in November.
