= XHHCC-FM =

Former radio station in Hércules, Sierra Mojada, Coahuila

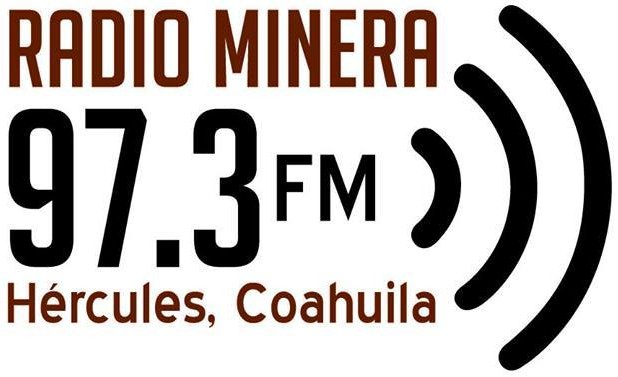

Hércules, Coahuila; Mexico
- Frequency: 97.3 MHz
- Branding: Radio Minera

Programming
- Format: Community radio

Ownership
- Owner: Asociación Amiga, A.C.

History
- First air date: November 20, 2013
- Call sign meaning: Hércules Coahuila

Technical information
- ERP: .05 kW

Links
- Website: www.facebook.com/pages/Radio-Minera-H%C3%A9rcules/231213367053995

XHHCC-FM is a radio station in Hércules, Coahuila, in the municipality of Sierra Mojada. It broadcasts on 97.3 FM and is known as Radio Minera, serving the local mining community. The station is presently broadcasting without a concession.

== History ==
XHHCC launched at 1pm on November 20, 2013 with the support of Altos Hornos de México (AHMSA), Minera del Norte (MINOSA) and the local chapter of the mining labor union. It is the first radio station in the isolated mining community.

XHHCC did not appear in the most recent IFT table release, dated March 31, 2016, because it failed to apply to transition to a public or social use concession. Asociación Amiga attempted to apply for a radio station as a community concession; the IFT denied the application on November 27, 2019, because the principals of Amiga did not include actual miners but merely management of the mine. IFT commissioners noted that a pure social station application would likely have been approved.
