= XHOCU-FM =

Indigenous radio station in Ocumicho, Michoacán

Ocumicho, Charapan, Michoacán; Mexico
- Frequency: 97.3 MHz
- Branding: Radio Uekakua

Programming
- Format: Indigenous

Ownership
- Owner: Comunidad Indígena Purépecha de Ocumicho

History
- First air date: March 30, 2017 (concession)
- Call sign meaning: OCUmicho

Technical information
- Class: A
- ERP: 391 watts
- HAAT: -199.2 meters
- Transmitter coordinates: 19°47′49.87″N 102°13′22.09″W

XHOCU-FM is an indigenous radio station on 97.3 FM in Ocumicho, a town in the municipality of Charapan, Michoacán, Mexico. The station is authorized to serve the primary localities of Ocumicho, Cocucho, San José de García Ruíz Cortínez, Patamban, La Cantera, Aranza, Tengüecho, Sirio, San Isidro, Uringuitiro, and Santa Rosa. The station is directly owned by the Purépecha indigenous community of Ocumicho.

== History ==
Radio Uekakua's history predates by years its legalization. The station had first applied for a permit in 2002 and in 2009 had still yet to receive a reply; the station was raided and forced off the air for lacking a permit in 2009; the Secretariat of Communications and Transportation claimed it had "lost" the application. The Federal Telecommunications and Broadcasting Law of 2014 created new indigenous and community station classes. The indigenous community at Ocumicho filed for a station once more on August 14, 2015, and the Federal Telecommunications Institute approved the concession award on January 25, 2017. In comparison with its 5-watt output as a pirate, XHOCU-FM is authorized for 391 watts, covering almost 42,000 people.
