= KAND =

Former radio station in Corsicana, Texas

Currently silent
- Corsicana, Texas; United States
- Broadcast area: Corsicana, Ennis and Waxahachie
- Frequency: 1340 kHz

Ownership
- Owner: New Century Broadcasting, LLC

History
- First air date: May 17, 1937

Technical information
- Licensing authority: FCC
- Facility ID: 13968
- Class: C
- Power: 1,000 watts
- Transmitter coordinates: 32°6′53.5″N 96°27′47.9″W
- Translator: 104.9 K285HC (Corsicana)

Links
- Public license information: Public file; LMS
- Website: kandradio.com

KAND (1340 AM) is a currently silent (Note: The station has yet to resume broadcasting.) radio station licensed to Corsicana, Texas, United States, that serves the Corsicana/Ennis/Waxahachie area. The station previously aired a classic country music format. However, the station shut down on October 31, 2024.

== History ==
KAND began in 1937 as a Variety/Entertainment station on 1310 kHz but four years later moved to AM 1340 and has maintained its variety format until the 1980s when they made a slow transition to Country music. The original station owner was J.C. West, who also owned the Wolf Brand (canned) Chili plant in Corsicana. West had applied for callsign WOLF, but the Federal Communications Commission wouldn't permit it because the WOLF call letters are currently in use on Syracuse, New York's AM station.

In March 2008 Yates Communications announced FCC approval to buy KAND.

On July 9, 2010, Yates decided to sell this station to New Century Broadcasting

In 2014, KAND shifted to country full-time and switched news sources from ABC News to CBS News.

On October 31, 2024, after 87 years of operations KAND went silent.
