= XHLY-FM =

Radio station in Morelia, Michoacán

Morelia, Michoacán; Mexico
- Frequency: 92.3 FM
- Branding: Infinito

Programming
- Format: Pop

Ownership
- Owner: Cadena RASA; (LY, S.A.)
- Sister stations: XHLQ-FM/XELQ-AM, XHATM-FM

History
- First air date: June 16, 1961 (concession)

Technical information
- ERP: 25 kW
- Transmitter coordinates: 19°41′58″N 101°08′30″W

XHLY-FM is a radio station on 92.3 FM in Morelia, Michoacán, Mexico. It is owned by Cadena RASA.

== History ==
XELY-AM 1430 received its concession on June 16, 1961. It was owned by Francisco Laris Iturbide and has remained in the family ever since. Later in the 1960s, XELY moved to 870 kHz. It broadcast with 1,000 watts throughout its life as an AM station.

XELY was cleared to move to FM in 2012. Until 2016, it carried the Candela grupera format, now on sister XHLQ-FM 90.1.

On January 1, 2021, XHLY dropped the Los 40 pop format from Radiópolis and became known as "2021 FM". The station name was changed a year later to "2022 FM", and so on depending on the year we are in.

It is currently known as Infinito.
