= WAUF-LP =

- Auburn, Alabama; United States
- Broadcast area: Auburn, Alabama, Columbus, Georgia
- Frequency: 97.3 MHz
- Branding: Revocation Radio

Programming
- Format: Christian Contemporary

Ownership
- Owner: Core Radio Ministry, Inc.

History
- Former frequencies: 94.3 MHz (2005–2008); 104.5 MHz (2008–2016)
- Call sign meaning: AUburn Fellowship

Technical information
- Licensing authority: FCC
- Facility ID: 133684
- Class: L1
- ERP: 66 watts
- HAAT: 36.9 meters (121 feet)
- Transmitter coordinates: 32°37′36″N 85°25′46″W

Links
- Public license information: LMS
- Website: http://myrevradio.com

WAUF-LP (97.3 FM, "Revocation Radio") is a radio station licensed to serve Auburn, Alabama. The station is owned by Core Radio Ministry, Inc. It airs a Christian rock and hip-hop radio format targeted at teens, college students, and young adults.

The station was assigned the WAUF-LP call letters by the Federal Communications Commission on August 13, 2004.
