= XHENI-FM =

Radio station in Uruapan, Michoacán

Tejerías/Uruapan, Michoacán; Mexico
- Frequency: 93.7 FM
- Branding: Los 40

Programming
- Format: Pop
- Affiliations: Radiópolis

Ownership
- Owner: Radiorama; (Radio Uruapan, S.A. de C.V.)
- Operator: Grupo AS Comunicación
- Sister stations: XHIP-FM, XHURM-FM

History
- First air date: September 27, 1967 (concession)
- Call sign meaning: Nueva Italia

Technical information
- ERP: 25 kW
- Transmitter coordinates: 19°23′12″N 102°00′43″W

Links
- Website: www.radioramamichoacan.com

XHENI-FM is a radio station on 93.7 FM in Tejerías, Michoacán, serving Uruapan. It carries the Los 40 pop format.

== History ==
XENI-AM received its concession on September 27, 1967. The station was owned by José Olalde Soria and based in Nueva Italia; it broadcast on 1320 kHz with 1,000 watts.

In 1991, XENI was sold to a group of nine people: Esteban Alcalá Villicaña, Domingo Basurto Reyes, Adela Ramírez Verdusco, Pablo Tafolla Cruz, Ramón Mejía Robledo, María Alejandra Tapia Aguilar, Rafael Madrigal lnacua, Salvador Gómez Navarro and Cecilia Durán Andrade. It moved to Uruapan and increased its power to 10,000 watts.

It was sold to Grupo ACIR and then to Radiorama. Later It migrated to FM in 2011.
