= XHZN-FM (Michoacán) =

Radio station in Zamora, Michoacán, Mexico

Zamora, Michoacán; Mexico
- Frequency: 88.1 MHz
- Branding: Los 40

Programming
- Format: Top 40
- Affiliations: Cadena RASA, Radiópolis

Ownership
- Owner: Grupo Radio Zamora; (Radio Ga Ga, S.A. de C.V.)
- Sister stations: XHQL-FM, XHGT-FM, XHEZM-FM

History
- First air date: May 1, 1980
- Former frequencies: 92.1 MHz (1980–2000s)

Technical information
- ERP: 10,000 watts

Links
- Webcast: Listen live
- Website: radiozamora.com.mx/xhzn.html

XHZN-FM is a radio station in Zamora, Michoacán, Mexico. Broadcasting on 88.1 FM, XHZN carries the Los 40 national format from Radiópolis.

== History ==
XHZN received its concession on May 30, 1980, originally specifying 92.1 MHz, a month after beginning operations. The station moved frequencies in the early 2000s.
