= CJIV-FM =

Former Christian radio station in Dryden, Ontario

- Dryden, Ontario; Canada
- Frequency: 97.3 MHz

Programming
- Format: Christian radio

Ownership
- Owner: Way of Life Broadcasting

History
- First air date: March 17, 2003
- Last air date: August 31, 2013

Technical information
- ERP: 50 watts
- Transmitter coordinates: 49°48′11″N 92°51′03″W

CJIV-FM was a Canadian radio station broadcasting at 97.3 FM in Dryden, Ontario, Canada with a Christian format.

== History ==
On February 7, 2003, Way of Life Broadcasting received approval from the Canadian Radio-television and Telecommunications Commission to operate a new low-power Christian music format. The new station would broadcast at 97.3 MHz with 50 watts. The station was launched on March 17, 2003.

On February 20, 2013, Way of Life Broadcasting has requested the revocation of its broadcasting licence for CJIV-FM, as of September 1, 2013, as they contended that it does not have the listenership to justify operating the station. Consequently, it will cease broadcasting by no later than August 31, 2013, the expiry date for the licence.
