= XHGQ-FM =

Radio station in Los Reyes, Michoacán

XHGQ-FM/XEGQ-AM
- Los Reyes, Michoacán; Mexico
- Frequencies: 92.5 FM; 1000 AM
- Branding: La Raza

Programming
- Format: Regional Mexican

Ownership
- Owner: Grupo Tremor Radio; (Tremor Comunicaciones, S.A. de C.V.)

History
- First air date: June 6, 1975 (concession)

Technical information
- Class: FM: AA; AM: B
- Power: AM: 3.5 kilowatts
- ERP: FM: 6 kW
- Transmitter coordinates: 19°35′06″N 102°28′03″W

XHGQ-FM/XEGQ-AM is a radio station on 92.5 FM and 1000 AM in Los Reyes, Michoacán. It carries the La Raza Regional Mexican format.

== History ==
Logo as La Ke Buena used to 2021

XEGQ-AM received its concession on June 6, 1975. It was owned by Gilberto Hossfeldt Díaz and broadcast with 1,000 watts on 1530 kHz.

In 2008, XEGQ was moved to 1000 kHz and raised its power to 3.5 kW.

XEGQ received approval to migrate to FM in 2011. The IFT assessed a continuity obligation in 2014, requiring the AM to remain on the air to serve listeners who otherwise had no radio service.

XHGQ-FM was sold to Tremor Comunicaciones, S.A. de C.V. effective December 12, 2018.
