= XHATM-FM =

Radio station in Morelia, Michoacán

Morelia, Michoacán; Mexico
- Frequency: 105.1 FM
- Branding: Radio Fórmula

Programming
- Format: News/talk
- Affiliations: Radio Fórmula

Ownership
- Owner: Cadena RASA; (Sucesión de José Laris Iturbide)
- Operator: MiMorelia.com
- Sister stations: XHLQ-FM/XELQ-AM, XHLY-FM

History
- First air date: August 7, 1978 (concession)
- Call sign meaning: A Toda Máquina (former format and name)

Technical information
- ERP: 25 kW
- Transmitter coordinates: 19°41′58″N 101°08′30″W

Links
- Website: mimorelia.com/radio-formula-morelia

XHATM-FM is a radio station on 105.1 FM in Morelia, Michoacán, Mexico. It is owned by Cadena RASA and carries Radio Fórmula programming.

== History ==
XECGP-AM 1520, a 500-watt daytimer received its concession on August 7, 1978. By the 1990s, the station was on 990 kHz as XEATM-AM, a call sign reflecting its format and name at the time, A Toda Máquina.

XEATM was cleared to move to FM in 2011.

In January 10, 2022, the station was operationally separated from Cadena RASA and taken over by MiMorelia.com, a local news website. Two new local newscasts were added with the change.
