= WCDT =

Radio station in Winchester, Tennessee

- Winchester, Tennessee; United States
- Frequency: 1340 kHz
- Branding: ESPN Radio Winchester

Programming
- Format: Sports radio
- Affiliations: ESPN Radio

Ownership
- Owner: Big Al Productions, Joe Abraham

History
- First air date: 1948

Technical information
- Licensing authority: FCC
- Facility ID: 22352
- Class: C
- Power: 1,000 watts unlimited
- Transmitter coordinates: 35°10′51.00″N 86°5′34.00″W

Links
- Public license information: Public file; LMS
- Webcast: Listen Live
- Website: espnwinchester.com

WCDT (1340 AM) is a radio station broadcasting a Sports radio format. Licensed to Winchester, Tennessee, United States, the station is currently under the ownership and management of Joe and Katy Abraham. It features primarily local sports programming and content from ESPN Radio.

Former logo

The current staff includes Joe and his second wife Katy Abraham, Christian "Chewy" Carroll, Lucky Knott, Clay Turner, and Keaton Solomon.

Abraham hosts a local sports variety show called "The Starting Lineup" from 7-9AM alongside his producer, Chewy. Nicknamed for his "Beastly" appearance. The station also simulcasts "The Blitz" out of Huntsville from 9-10AM, co-hosted by Joe's younger brother and Franklin County High School Graduate, John Abraham who goes by the moniker "Captain Cool". From Noon-2PM, the station also carries "The Thom Abraham Show", hosted by Joe's father and Winchester, TN resident, and host of nationally syndicated Bassmaster Radio - Thom Abraham.

Lucky Knott hosts "The Coach's Corner" every Saturday morning from 9-10AM. The show features local area coaches, athletic directors and more - highlighting the regions rich sports heritage. Knott is also editor and chief content provider for 931News.com.

Along with covering sports from two local area high schools (the Franklin County Rebels and Huntland Hornets); the station is an affiliate of the Tennessee Volunteers, Atlanta Braves, and Tennessee Titans radio network.
