= WENV-LP =

- Gainesboro, Tennessee; United States
- Frequency: 97.3 MHz
- Branding: WENV 97.3 The Warrior

Programming
- Format: Variety

Ownership
- Owner: Save the Cumberland, Inc.

Technical information
- Licensing authority: FCC
- Facility ID: 134993
- Class: L1
- ERP: 28 watts
- HAAT: 55.0 meters (180.4 ft)
- Transmitter coordinates: 36°16′56.00″N 85°48′39.00″W

Links
- Public license information: LMS
- Website: savethecumberland.org

WENV-LP (97.3 FM, "WENV 97.3 The Warrior") is a radio station licensed to Gainesboro, Tennessee, United States. The station is currently owned by Save the Cumberland, Inc.

== Coverage Area ==
WENV-LP is licensed to Gainesboro, Tennessee, but does not serve that community with either its City or Service grade signals. WENV-LP serves a stretch of the Cumberland River with little to no population.
