= XHIP-FM =

Radio station in Uruapan, Michoacán

XHIP-FM, XEIP-AM
- Uruapan, Michoacán; Mexico
- Frequency: 89.7 FM/1050 AM
- Branding: La Poderosa

Programming
- Format: Regional Mexican

Ownership
- Owner: Grupo Radiorama; (XEIP-AM, S.A. de C.V.)
- Operator: Grupo AS Comunicación
- Sister stations: XHENI-FM, XHURM-FM

History
- First air date: August 3, 1994 (concession)

Technical information
- Power: 1 kW
- ERP: 3 kW

Links
- Website: www.radioramamichoacan.com

XHIP-FM/XEIP-AM is a combo radio station on 89.7 FM and 1050 AM in Uruapan, Michoacán. It is owned by Grupo Radiorama and carries its La Poderosa Regional Mexican format.

== History ==
XEIP-AM 750 received its concession on August 3, 1994, owned by Radiorama subsidiary Voz y Música, S.A. Just a few months later, on November 4, it became an AM-FM combo. The AM station was later moved to 1050.
