= KBHJ =

- Blythe, California; United States
- Frequency: 97.3 MHz

Programming
- Format: Country

Ownership
- Owner: Northaway Broadcasting, LLC

History
- First air date: February 2, 2017

Technical information
- Licensing authority: FCC
- Facility ID: 190450
- Class: A
- ERP: 0.24 Kw
- HAAT: -23 meters (-75.459 feet)

Links
- Public license information: Public file; LMS

KBHJ is a radio station broadcasting a country music format on 97.3 FM to Blythe, California. It went on the air on February 2, 2017.
