= CHGA-FM =

Coordinates: 46°13′22″N 76°05′54″W

Radio CHGA
- Maniwaki, Quebec, Canada; Canada
- Frequency: 97.3 MHz (FM)

Programming
- Format: community radio

Ownership
- Owner: Radio communautaire FM de la Haute-Gatineau

History
- First air date: 1980

Technical information
- Class: B
- ERP: 11,900 watts
- HAAT: 205 meters (673 ft)

Links
- Website: CHGA Website

CHGA-FM is a french language community radio station that operates at 97.3 FM in Maniwaki, Quebec, Canada.

Launched in 1980, the station is owned by Radio communautaire FM de la Haute-Gatineau.

The station is a member of the Association des radiodiffuseurs communautaires du Québec.

On July 19, 2017, the Canadian Radio-television and Telecommunications Commission (CRTC) approved the application by Radio communautaire F.M. de la Haute-Gatineau inc. to increase its average effective radiated power (ERP) from 2,877 to 11,900 watts (maximum ERP increasing from 2,877 to 16,900 watts), by changing the antenna’s radiation pattern from non-directional to directional and by decreasing the effective height of antenna above average terrain (HAAT) from 214 to 205 metres.
