= XHECA-FM =

Community radio station in Amecameca, State of Mexico

- Amecameca, State of Mexico; Mexico
- Frequency: 97.3 MHz
- Branding: La Voladora

Programming
- Format: Noncommercial community radio

Ownership
- Owner: La Voladora Comunicación, A.C.

History
- First air date: October 27, 2000; May 9, 2005 (permit)
- Call sign meaning: From "Amecameca"

Technical information
- ERP: 0.162 kW
- HAAT: 292.2 meters
- Transmitter coordinates: 19°08′01.39″N 98°45′57″W

Links
- Website: lavoladora.net

XHECA-FM is a community radio station in Amecameca, State of Mexico, broadcasting on 97.3 FM. The station's concession is held by La Voladora Comunicación, A.C., and the station is known as La Voladora. XHECA is a member of AMARC México.

== History ==
The 1999 UNAM strike sowed the seeds for a number of community radio stations across Mexico, including La Voladora, as well as XHCD-FM in Hermosillo. During the strike, students operated a radio station known as "La Ke Huelga". Several people involved with that station, and with other similar projects, banded together to form a new station project known as La Voladora ("The Flyer"). Initially conceived as being a moving, 20-watt FM radio station that would visit rural areas. As part of that project, La Voladora set up shop in Amecameca on October 27, 2000, on 102.1 MHz, without a permit to operate.

In December 2000, Popocatépetl, the nearby volcano, recorded its largest eruption in 1,200 years. As a result of the natural emergency, La Voladora opted to remain in Amecameca permanently. Additionally, the station began to fight to obtain a permit, and in May 2005, La Voladora received a permit for XHECA-FM on 97.3 MHz.

In August 2017, the Federal Telecommunications Institute approved a relocation of the station's transmitter. A second site change was approved in 2021.
