= XHQL-FM =

Radio station in Zamora, Michoacán, Mexico

- Zamora, Michoacán; Mexico
- Frequency: 91.7 FM
- Branding: Catedral de la Música

Programming
- Format: Regional Mexican
- Affiliations: Cadena RASA

Ownership
- Owner: Grupo Radio Zamora; (Radiodifusora del Valle de Zamora, S.A.)
- Sister stations: XHZN-FM, XHGT-FM, XHEZM-FM

History
- First air date: October 16, 1959 (concession)

Technical information
- ERP: 6 kW
- Transmitter coordinates: 19°58′01″N 102°15′55″W

Links
- Webcast: Listen live
- Website: cadenarasa.com

XHQL-FM is a radio station on 91.7 FM in Zamora, Michoacán. It is owned by Grupo Radio Zamora and is known as Catedral de la Música, which offers a Regional Mexican format.

== History ==
XEQL-AM received its concession on October 15, 1959. It was owned by Fernando Jiménez Torres until 1964 and broadcast with 1,000 watts on 1580 kHz.

In the early 2000s, XEQL was moved to 1260 kHz and increased nighttime power from 250 to 1,000 watts.

XEQL received approval to migrate to FM in 2011.
