= WPRE =

- Prairie du Chien, Wisconsin; United States
- Frequency: 980 kHz
- Branding: Prairie's Own

Programming
- Format: Classic hits

Ownership
- Owner: Robinson Corporation
- Sister stations: WQPC

History
- First air date: 1952
- Call sign meaning: Prairie

Technical information
- Licensing authority: FCC
- Facility ID: 53303
- Class: D
- Power: 1,000 watts (day); 30 watts (night)
- Transmitter coordinates: 43°03′39″N 91°09′26″W
- Translators: 99.5 W258DW (Seneca); 104.3 W282BU (Prairie du Chien)

Links
- Public license information: Public file; LMS
- Website: wqpcradio.com

WPRE (980 AM) is a commercial radio station licensed to Prairie du Chien, Wisconsin, United States, and featuring a classic hits format. WPRE began as a daytime only station, but now broadcasts at night with reduced power. The station is licensed to Robinson Corporation which is owned by David and Jane Robinson. WPRE has an FM sister station at 94.3 MHz. with the call letters WQPC (formerly WPRE-FM).

The transmitter and broadcast tower are located on the west side of Prairie du Chien next to the Mississippi River. According to the Antenna Structure Registration database, the tower is 74 m (243 ft) tall.

On August 30, 2014, WPRE changed their format from oldies (as "Cruisin' 980") to classic hits, branded as "Prairie's Own".
