= XHURM-FM =

Radio station in Michoacán, Mexico

- Uruapan, Michoacán; Mexico
- Frequency: 102.1 FM
- Branding: La Mexicana

Programming
- Format: Regional Mexican

Ownership
- Owner: Grupo Radiorama; (XEURM-AM, S.A. de C.V.)
- Operator: Grupo AS Comunicación
- Sister stations: XHENI-FM, XHIP-FM

History
- First air date: November 30, 1994 (concession)
- Call sign meaning: URuapan Michoacán

Technical information
- ERP: 3 kW
- Transmitter coordinates: 19°27′14″N 102°02′34″W

Links
- Website: www.radioramamichoacan.com

XHURM-FM is a radio station on 102.1 FM in Uruapan, Michoacán. It is owned by Grupo Radiorama and known as La Mexicana with a Regional Mexican format.

== History ==
XEURM-AM 1440 received its concession on November 30, 1994, owned by Radiorama subsidiary Radio Olin, S.A. The AM station was later moved to 1050, and then 750 in a swap with XEIP-AM. It was moved to FM in 2011.

In 2015, XHURM-FM was moved from 25 kW at a site in Tejerías to Cerro de la Cruz and slashed its ERP to 3 kW.
