= WJWC-LP =

- Grand Rapids, Michigan; United States
- Broadcast area: Kentwood-Grand Rapids-Wyoming
- Frequency: 97.3 MHz
- Branding: The Heat

Programming
- Format: Urban contemporary

Ownership
- Owner: Empowerment Radio Project

History
- First air date: 2016
- Call sign meaning: Jon W. Covington

Technical information
- Licensing authority: FCC
- Facility ID: 197675
- Class: L1
- ERP: 49 watts
- HAAT: 43 m
- Transmitter coordinates: 42°58′57.9″N 85°39′54.9″W

Links
- Public license information: LMS
- Website: theheat973.com

WJWC-LP ("97.3 The Heat") is a radio station in Grand Rapids, Michigan. It is owned by the Empowerment Radio Project.

== History ==
The station was established by the Community Empowerment Project, a non-profit corporation founded by the late Robert LaDew in 1994. Mr. LaDew was the publisher of Grand Rapids, Michigan based Equality Magazine that organized the African American Festival, and continued the festival after 2000 when the city of Grand Rapids dropped its funding support. Mr. LaDew died in 2004, according to the station Facebook Page.

An application was filed by the non-profit to license a new Low Power FM station for Grand Rapids in 2014 and began operations in 2016. At that time, control of the Community Empowerment Project was split equally among Jon Covington, Al Brown, and David Dew.

As of 2019, the President of the non-profit was Jose A Flores, with Mr Brown and Few continuing as directors.
