= WWCC-LP =

Coordinates: 40.391°N 86.864°W

West Lafayette, Indiana; United States
- Broadcast area: Lafayette, Indiana
- Frequency: 97.3 (MHz)

Programming
- Format: Inspirational

Ownership
- Owner: Triangle Foundation, Inc.

History
- First air date: 2005
- Call sign meaning: World-Wide Christian Connection

Technical information
- Licensing authority: FCC
- Class: L1
- ERP: 14 watts
- HAAT: 78.64 meters

Links
- Public license information: LMS
- Website: http://www.wwcconline.org

WWCC-LP (97.3 FM) is a radio station licensed to the Triangle Foundation, based in Lafayette, Indiana. WWCC broadcasts at an effective radiated power of 14 watts. The station office is located 101 N. 10th St.Lafayette, IN with a tower facility located on South 30th Street in Lafayette, IN.

== History ==
WWCC began broadcasting in April, 2005 with an inspirational format, featuring Bible teaching, talk, and Christian Contemporary praise and worship music. WWCC is the only Christian station in Lafayette with locally originated programming.
