= XHLC-FM (Michoacán) =

Radio station in La Piedad, Michoacán

XHLC-FM/XELC-AM
- La Piedad, Michoacán; Mexico
- Frequencies: 92.7 MHz; 980 kHz
- Branding: Radio Pía

Programming
- Format: Regional Mexican

Ownership
- Owner: Guizar Comunicación Integral; (980 Dual Estéreo, S.A. de C.V.)
- Sister stations: XHLP-FM

History
- First air date: 1945

Technical information
- Power: 1 kW day.2 kW night
- ERP: 50 watts
- Transmitter coordinates: 20°19′55″N 102°01′31″W (AM); 20°18′13″N 102°06′53″W (FM)

Links
- Website: www.radiopia.mx

XHLC-FM/XELC-AM is a radio station in La Piedad, Michoacán. Broadcasting on 92.7 FM and 980 AM, XHLC is owned by the Guizar family and known as Radio Pía, with a Regional Mexican format.

== History ==
The concession for XELC-AM was awarded to Heriberto Guizar Castro in August 1945. The FM station was obtained in 1994.

Logo before making 92.7 the primary frequency over 980

While the concessionaire is known as Dual Estéreo, that musical format originally was used on previous XHLP-FM 89.9 until 2019, owned by the same family.
