= Media Group Radio =

Radio network in Michoacán, Mexico

Media Group Radio is a network of radio stations owned and operated by Media Group (Media FM, S.A. de C.V.) in the Mexican state of Michoacán. The stations carry a variety of news and talk programs during the day and musical programming in off hours.

== History ==
Media Group won eight radio stations in Michoacán in the IFT-4 radio auction of 2017. Acustik Michoacán began internet transmissions on January 15, 2018, coinciding with the first day of the Informe Brozo, the first national radio-TV program syndicated by Grupo Acustik, with which Acustik Michoacán was affiliated. Acustik Michoacán also carries the audio of the Canal 6 TV newscasts produced by Media Group for its cable station. The FM transmissions began between April and early June 2018, followed by the Morelia AM station in June 2018 and the Uruapan station later in the year.

In late March 2019, the Acustik branding was dropped and the stations became "Media Group Radio".

== Stations ==
Six FM and two AM radio stations carry the Media Group Radio programming.

The Apatzingán, Ciudad Hidalgo and Pátzcuaro transmitters broadcast in HD Radio.

Callsign	Frequency	City	Class	ERP/power	HAAT
XHPAPM-FM	100.9	Apatzingán	AA	4.91 kW	-142.48 m
XHPHGO-FM	92.7	Ciudad Hidalgo	A	3 kW	-224.25 m
XHPMAR-FM	94.3	Maravatío	A	2.999 kW	-148.47 m
XHPNIM-FM	97.1	Nueva Italia	A	3 kW	19.01 m
XHPATZ-FM	103.7	Pátzcuaro	A	3 kW	-117.04 m
XHPQUI-FM	92.7	Quiroga	A	2.998 kW	-164.94 m
XEMEFM-AM	1240	Morelia	B	25 kW	
XEUORN-AM	750	Uruapan	B	10 kW	
