= 99.7 FM =

FM radio frequency

The following radio stations broadcast on FM frequency 99.7 MHz:

== Argentina ==
- Alegría in Córdoba
- Angelica in Angélica, Santa Fe
- Argentina in Mina Clavero, Córdoba
- Centro in Santa Rosa, Corrientes
- Cordial in Las Breñas, Chaco
- Cristal in Villa Unión, La Rioja
- Espacio in Villa General Belgrano, Córdoba
- Frecuencia Romántica in San Luis
- Gospel in Rosario, Santa Fe
- La Balsa in Villa Gesell, Buenos Aires
- La Cima in Tupungato, Mendoza
- Las Higueras in Las Higueras, Córdoba
- Libertad in Porteña, Córdoba
- Live in Eldorado, Misiones
- Latina Digital in Moreno, Buenos Aires
- Nuevos Aires in La Plata, Buenos Aires
- Ruta in Sanagasta, La Rioja
- Santa Lucía Department in San Juan
- Tradición in Berazategui, Buenos Aires
- UNNE in Corrientes
- Voces in Salta

== Australia ==
- Rhema FM in Newcastle, New South Wales
- 2RGF in Griffith, New South Wales
- ABC Local Radio in Yulara, Northern Territory
- Radio National in Alice Springs, Northern Territory
- 4RED in Redcliffe, Queensland
- Sea FM in Scottsdale, Tasmania
- 3MCR in Mansfield, Victoria
- 3MRR in Corryong, Victoria
- Radio National in Horsham, Victoria
- Radio National in Omeo, Victoria
- Radio National in Geraldton, Western Australia

== Hong Kong ==
- Metro Radio Info 997

== Canada (Channel 259) ==
- CBON-FM-2 in Haileybury, Ontario
- CBUF-FM-9 in Victoria, British Columbia
- CFFM-FM-1 in 100 Mile House (Mount Timothy), British Columbia
- CFNA-FM in Bonnyville, Alberta
- CFXO-FM in Okotoks/High River, Alberta
- CKNC-FM in Simcoe, Ontario
- CHJM-FM in St-Georges-de-Beauce, Quebec
- CHME-FM-1 in Tadoussac, Quebec
- CHME-FM-2 in Sacre Coeur, Quebec
- CHME-FM-3 in Forestville, Quebec
- CHPH-FM in Wemindji, Quebec
- CIQC-FM in Campbell River, British Columbia
- CIYN-FM-1 in Goderich, Ontario
- CJAY-FM-3 in Invermere, British Columbia
- CJOT-FM in Ottawa, Ontario
- CJRI-FM-3 in New Bandon, New Brunswick
- CJVR-FM-3 in Carrot River, Saskatchewan
- CKAJ-FM-1 in La Baie, Quebec
- CKDY in Digby, Nova Scotia
- CKPT-FM in Peterborough, Ontario
- VF2149 in Lac Allard, Quebec
- VF2458 in Passmore, British Columbia

== China ==
- CNR Music Radio in Yinchuan
- CNR The Voice Of China in Enping, Jiangmen

== Honduras ==
- HRVV-FM in San Pedro Sula, Cortés

== Kuwait ==
- Radio Kuwait Superstation, Kuwait City

== Latvia ==
- Radio SWH in Pavilosta

== Malaysia ==
- My in Penang, Alor Setar and Perlis
- Raaga in Malacca & North Johor

== Mexico ==
- XHBTH-FM in San Bartolo Tutotepec, Hidalgo
- XHCPBR-FM in San Javier, Sonora
- XHCOC-FM in Colima, Colima
- XHEPI-FM in Tixtla de Guerrero, Guerrero
- XHETR-FM in Ciudad Valles, San Luis Potosí
- XHHID-FM in Ciudad Hidalgo, Michoacán
- XHHRH-FM in Huejutla de Reyes, Hidalgo
- XHIT-FM in Ciudad del Carmen, Campeche
- XHLAC-FM in Lázaro Cárdenas, Michoacán
- XHOH-FM in Durango, Durango
- XHOL-FM in Chignautla, Puebla
- XHORF-FM in Mochicahui, Sinaloa
- XHPB-FM in Veracruz, Veracruz
- XHPL-FM in Ciudad Acuña, Coahuila
- XHPLVI-FM in Calvillo, Aguascalientes
- XHPYUC-FM in Peto, Yucatán
- XHRUA-FM in Uruapan, Michoacán
- XHSCCG-FM in Ciudad Nezahualcóyotl, State of Mexico
- XHSP-FM in Monterrey, Nuevo León
- XHTY-FM in Tijuana, Baja California
- XHUAH-FM in Pachuca, Hidalgo
- XHUAX-FM in Toluca, Estado de México

== Morocco ==
- Atlantic Radio in Agadir

== Paraguay ==
- Educación in Ciudad del Este

== Philippines ==
- DYEA in Sofronio Española, Palawan
- Brigada News FM in Kabankalan
- Juander Radyo in Digos City
- DXYK in Butuan, Agusan Del Norte
- Radyo Serbato in Cabadbaran City

== Taiwan ==
- Nantou Radio in Taichung

== United States (Channel 259) ==
- KAAC in Utqiavik, Alaska
- KAFZ in Ash Fork, Arizona
- KARZ (FM) in Marshall, Minnesota
- KBCY in Tye, Texas
- KBEA in Muscatine, Iowa
- KBOD in Gainesville, Missouri
- KBTN in Neosho, Missouri
- KBZD in Amarillo, Texas
- KCDI-LP in Dodge City, Kansas
- KCHT in Childress, Texas
- KCIG-LP in Craig, Colorado
- KESC in Morro Bay, California
- KETE in Sulphur Bluff, Texas
- KGHF in Belle Plaine, Kansas
- KHGV-LP in Houston, Texas
- KHHK in Yakima, Washington
- KHYZ in Mountain Pass, California
- KIOO in Porterville, California
- KKDG in Durango, Colorado
- KLHG-LP in Galveston, Texas
- KLMY in Long Beach, Washington
- KMBQ in Wasilla, Alaska
- KMJJ in Shreveport, Louisiana
- KMTK in Bend, Oregon
- KMVQ in San Francisco, California
- KOGA in Ogallala, Nebraska
- KOYM-LP in Houston, Texas
- KQRK in Pablo, Montana
- KQUA-LP in Roseburg, Oregon
- KRSN-LP in Show Low, Arizona
- KSIT in Rock Springs, Wyoming
- KTOR in Gerber, California
- KTTR-FM in Saint James, Missouri
- KVST (FM) in Huntsville, Texas
- KVUT in Cuney, Texas
- KWFF in Alva, Oklahoma
- KWPS-FM in Caddo Valley, Arkansas
- KXDL in Browerville, Minnesota
- KXFT in Fort Dodge, Iowa
- KYLQ in Encinal, Texas
- KZEB-LP in Jamestown, North Dakota
- KZPT in Kansas City, Missouri
- WBGK in Newport Village, New York
- WBHX in Tuckerton, New Jersey
- WBVL-LP in Kissimmee, Florida
- WCYK in Staunton, Virginia
- WCYZ in Ocala, Florida
- WDJX in Louisville, Kentucky
- WDKF in Sturgeon Bay, Wisconsin
- WEAN in Wakefield-Peacedale, Rhode Island
- WGCK-FM in Coeburn, Virginia
- WIDT-LP in Winter Garden, Florida
- WIMI in Ironwood, Michigan
- WIWI-LP in Milwaukee, Wisconsin
- WJKD in Vero Beach, Florida
- WJMI in Jackson, Mississippi
- WJUX in South Fallsburg, New York
- WKSD in Paulding, Ohio
- WLCQ-LP in Feeding Hills, Massachusetts
- WLFP in Memphis, Tennessee
- WMYU-LP in Ooltewah, Tennessee
- WNTK in New London, New Hampshire
- WOOF in Dothan, Alabama
- WQXY-LP in Fort Myers, Florida
- WRFX in Kannapolis, North Carolina
- WRKZ in Columbus, Ohio
- WSHH in Pittsburgh, Pennsylvania
- WSHW in Frankfort, Indiana
- WUGN in Midland, Michigan
- WUGO in Grayson, Kentucky
- WVRZ in Mount Carmel, Pennsylvania
- WWIS in Black River Falls, Wisconsin
- WWRG-LP in Lake Mary, Florida
- WWSO-LP in Hillsville, Virginia
- WWTN in Hendersonville, Tennessee
- WWWQ in Atlanta, Georgia
- WXAJ in Hillsboro, Illinois
- WXCN-LP in Lexington, Kentucky
- WXST in Hollywood, South Carolina
- WYFI in Norfolk, Virginia
- WZXV in Palmyra, New York
