= Nick Grono =

Australian human rights activist (born 1966)

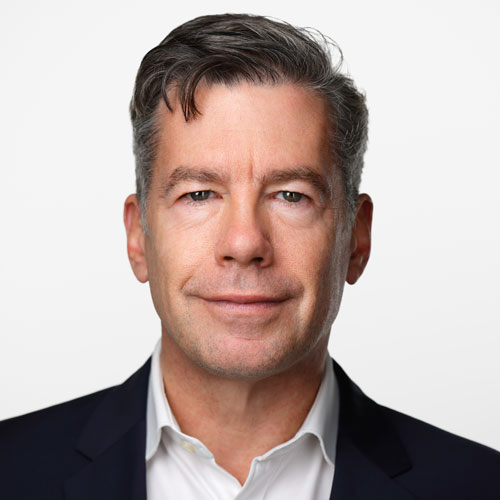
- Born: 22 July 1966 (age 60); Lübeck, West Germany
- Occupation: Human Rights Campaigner
- Known for: Freedom Fund, Walk Free Foundation, International Crisis Group
- Title: CEO, Freedom Fund
- Term: December 2013–present

Nick Grono (born 22 July 1966) is an Australian human rights campaigner who heads the Freedom Fund, a global fund with the sole aim of helping end modern slavery. He serves on the advisory councils of Global Witness and the McCain Institute. He was previously the Chair of the Jo Cox Foundation and a board member of Girls Not Brides, the Global Partnership to End Child Marriage.

Grono, who trained as a lawyer, served as Chief of Staff to the Australian Attorney-General. He went on to take a senior position at the International Crisis Group, the world's leading conflict resolution NGO. As CEO of the Walk Free Foundation, he helped launch the first ever Global Slavery Index.

Grono has been CEO of Freedom Fund since January 2014.

== Early years ==
Grono spent a number of years growing up on the square-rigged sailing ship “Eye of the Wind” (built 1911). With his father as captain, Grono sailed from England to Australia from October 1976 to December 1977, accompanied by his mother, younger brother and 25 other crew members. The trip took them to the West Indies, the Panama Canal, the Galapagos, Easter Island, Pitcairn, Tahiti and Vanuatu, and many others. He and his family repeated the voyage in 1981/1982, this time also taking part in the filming of “Nate and Hayes” in Fiji with actor Tommy Lee Jones.

== Early career ==
Grono received a law degree with first class honours from the University of Sydney. He also holds a Masters in Public Policy from Princeton University. He began his career as a lawyer in Perth, Western Australia. He then worked at Goldman Sachs in London from 1992 to 1994 as a researcher. In 1994 he returned to Australia to work as a lawyer, eventually becoming the Chief of Staff and National Security Adviser to the Australian Attorney-General (from 1999 to 2001).

== Activism work ==
In 2003, Grono began working for the International Crisis Group, the world's leading conflict prevention NGO based in Brussels, Belgium. He became the Deputy President and COO in 2008, responsible for the oversight and management of the organisation's programmes and operations in nearly thirty countries around the world. As part of this role, he testified on conflict and human rights issues before the European, UK, Dutch, and Australian Parliaments.

He joined the Walk Free Foundation as its CEO in 2012. During his time as the CEO, the Walk Free movement gained over 5 million supporters. In 2013, the Foundation launched the first ever Global Slavery Index. Grono has written widely on international justice, conflict prevention, human rights, and modern slavery in the New York Times, The Guardian, Foreign Policy, Huffington Post and elsewhere. In December 2015, Grono was an expert witness before the UN Security Council at its hearing on Trafficking in Persons in Situations of Conflict.

Grono was co-chair of the Jo Cox Foundation from late 2016 to 2019 and a board member of Girls Not Brides, the Global Partnership to End Child Marriage, since 2015. He currently serves on the advisory councils of Global Witness and the McCain Institute.

== The Freedom Fund ==
In 2013, the Walk Free Foundation joined with Humanity United and the Legatum Foundation to establish the Freedom Fund, the world's first philanthropic fund dedicated to identifying and investing in the most effective frontline efforts to end modern slavery. The Freedom Fund was announced by President Bill Clinton at the Clinton Global Initiative in September 2013, who declared, “This is a huge deal and we should all support this.” The Fund focuses its work on areas where slavery is prevalent using a “hotspot” funding model. It identifies effective local anti-slavery initiatives and invests to improve their effectiveness and impact. Central to this approach is the belief that “by listening to, funding and supporting local organisations, we can contribute to tangible, sustainable change.” The Fund also invests in efforts to shift corporate behavior as a driver of forced labor across all sectors of the global economy. It seeks to support and strengthen the global anti-slavery movement through programs such as Freedom Rising and the Survivor Leadership Fund.

The Fund has worked with over 120 frontline partners around the world to directly liberate 30,767 people from slavery and enable over 153,000 at risk children to return to school. Overall, its programs have positively impacted the lives of over 1.4 million of those most vulnerable to exploitation and indirectly impacted millions more through systems change efforts.

In the years before the Walk Free Foundation, Grono was with International Crisis Group (ICG) working at its central office in Brussels.

In 2024, Grono published the book How to Lead Nonprofits: Turning Purpose into Impact to Change the World.
