= Bali Process =

The Bali Process.

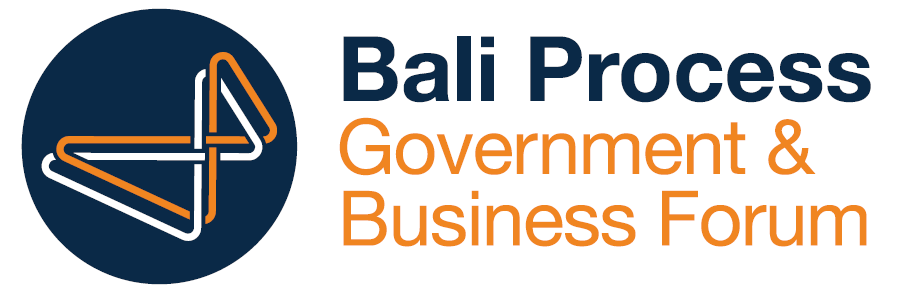
Bali Process Government and Business Forum.

The Bali Process is an official international forum, established in 2002, to facilitate discussion and information sharing about issues relating to people smuggling, human trafficking, and related transnational crime and appropriate responses to these issues.

The Bali Process was established through a framework agreement that was initiated at the "Regional Ministerial Conference on People Smuggling, Trafficking in Persons and Related Transnational Crime" held in Bali, Indonesia in February 2002.

Over 50 countries and numerous international agencies continue to participate in the Bali Process. It is co-chaired by the Governments of Indonesia and Australia.

== History ==
The Bali Process is a non-binding, international forum that exists for policy dialogue, information sharing and exchange to aid each participating state to address these challenges established in the First Bali Ministerial Conference.

The outcomes of the conference can be reviewed in three focal points. Firstly, the ministers recognised that the illegal movements of people were an increasing problem as it creates “significant political, economic, social and security challenges” in national sovereignty. Secondly, links to terrorism and the criminal nature of human trafficking were expressed as points of deep concern, denouncing it as “reprehensible criminal activities” that infringed on basic human rights and freedom. Thirdly, the meeting affirmed a strong commitment that participating states should cooperate and provide support in developing measures to combat people smuggling. It was expressed that the state should “provide appropriate protection and assistance” to the victims of trafficking, within the international framework and domestic law.

== Core objectives ==
At the Third Bali Process Regional Ministerial Conference in 2009, the objectives were expanded to accommodate a more humanitarian approach to migrant smugglings.

The objectives were amended to the following:

1. the development of more effective information and intelligence sharing;
2. improved cooperation among regional law enforcement agencies to deter and combat people smuggling and trafficking networks;
3. enhanced cooperation on border and visa systems to detect and prevent illegal movements;
4. increased public awareness in order to discourage these activities and warn those susceptible;
5. enhanced effectiveness of return as a strategy to deter people smuggling and trafficking through conclusion of appropriate arrangements;
6. cooperation in verifying the identity and nationality of illegal migrants and trafficking victims;
7. the enactment of national legislation to criminalise people smuggling and trafficking in persons;
8. provision of appropriate protection and assistance to the victims of trafficking, particularly women and children;
9. enhanced focus on tackling the root causes of illegal migration, including by increasing opportunities for legal migration between states;
10. assisting countries to adopt best practices in asylum management, in accordance with the principles of the Refugees Convention; and
11. advancing the implementation of an inclusive non-binding regional cooperation framework under which interested parties can cooperate more effectively to reduce irregular movement through the region.

== Structure ==
The Bali Process is led by a steering group of four countries (Australia, Indonesia, New Zealand and Thailand), and is co-chaired by Australia and Indonesia. Currently, the Bali Process comprises 45 states, as well as the IOM, UNHCR and UNODC.

=== Membership ===
The full list of member countries to the Bali Process is set out on the Membership Page of the official Bali Process website but the main countries and agencies involved in the meetings include the following:

- Afghanistan
- Australia
- China
- India
- Indonesia
- Japan
- Malaysia
- Pakistan
- Papua New Guinea
- Philippines
- Republic of Korea
- Singapore
- Sri Lanka
- USA
- Vietnam
- International Organization for Migration
- UN High Commissioner for Refugees
- UN Office on Drugs and Crime
- International Labour Organization

=== Bali Process Ad Hoc Group (AHG) ===
The AHG comprises the most affected states, often taking the lead on collective action and focusing on specific issues of people smuggling, trafficking in persons and irregular migration.

Members of the AHG are:

- Afghanistan
- Australia
- Bangladesh
- India
- Indonesia
- Malaysia
- Maldives
- Myanmar
- New Zealand
- Pakistan
- Philippines
- Sri Lanka
- Thailand
- UAE
- USA
- Viet Nam
- IOM
- UNHCR
- UNODC

The formation of the AHG occurred after the Third Bali Ministerial Conference, where ministers requested to make the AHG available as a mechanism to comprehensively deal with issues that impact the affected states on a case-by-case basis.

They report developments to the wider membership of the Bali Process. The Steering Group oversees their work, and IOM often provides support on administrative matters.

They are tasked to:

1. develop practical outcomes at the operational level to assist countries to mitigate increased irregular population movements;
2. to enhance information sharing arrangements between most-affected countries; and
3. to report to Co-Chairs through the Steering Group with concrete recommendations to inform future regional cooperation on people smuggling and trafficking in persons.

The AHG has proven itself to be the critical mechanism in advancing the outcomes set out in the different meetings. It administers practical cooperation among Bali Process members to respond effectively to persistent and emerging challenges. It formally acknowledged the Bali Process Strategy For Cooperation as a ‘living’ document that will be revised regularly as future activities continue. The Bali Process Strategy outlines coordinated approaches to be implemented to migration challenges in order to strengthen the work of the organisation.

Annual AHG Senior Official Meetings have been held since its conception in 2009, and biannually in the years 2009 and 2011. They have held numerous workshops to address the different issues of illegal migration. In February 2017, they held the first Regional Biometric Data Exchange Solution (RBDES) Workshop, where immigration and foreign affairs officials were trained to use RBDES, a multinational tool that provides a data sharing framework. It allows the Bali Process members to share data with any other participating state.

=== Working Groups ===
The AHG has maintained a regular program of senior official meetings as well as working group level activities. Working groups were established in order to assist states in thoroughly and specifically addressing the different aspects to the issues of people smuggling and trafficking in persons.

==== Working Group on Trafficking in Persons ====
This Working Group focuses on developing more effective legal and law enforcement responses to combat trafficking in persons. It aims to provide a mechanism for Bali Process members to exchange effective practices, policies and legal responses, along with identifying areas for cooperation in responding to trafficking in persons. It is co-chaired by Australia and Indonesia, and reports annually to the AHG. This Working Group was established in 2013 as an outcome of the Fifth Ad Hoc Senior Official Meeting.

They met for the first time in 2015, and have developed a Forward Work Plan that sets out action items for the years 2015–2017. This involved action items such as identifying a list of priority issues for the regions, and provide training to relevant officials to capably respond to trafficking in persons.

==== Working Group on Disruption of Criminal Networks Involved in People Smuggling and Trafficking in Persons ====
The Working Group aims to provide ‘concrete, action oriented activities’ that enhance cooperation in disrupting criminal networks involved in people smuggling and trafficking in persons in the Asia Pacific region. It is co-chaired by New Zealand and Sri Lanka and reports annually to the AHG. Fifteen countries from the AHG members compose this Working Group.

During their first meeting in May 2015, eight states (Indonesia, Malaysia, Maldives, New Zealand, Philippines, Sri Lanka, and Thailand) planned and participated in a Joint Period of Action to targeting criminal networks in sexual and labour exploitation and people smuggling.

Notably, authorities in the eight countries:

- assisted 59 trafficked persons;
- made 32 arrests and launched eight new investigations;
- made over 70 bilateral and international enquires to progress trafficking in persons and people smuggling investigations;
- conducted 68 awareness-raising activities, including for employers, civil society, and vulnerable groups; and
- carried out 12 training sessions and trained 485 police, airport, immigration, and compliance officers throughout the region.

Joint Periods of Action continue as a regular activity for the participating countries.

==== Technical Experts Working Group on Irregular Movements ====
The Working Group works to assist countries in understanding and detecting irregular movements through borders. It aims to deal effectively with people smugglers by pursuing and prosecuting those involved in illegal activity. Initially, in 2009 it was focused on irregular movement by air but was expanded to movements by land and sea in 2012.

=== Regional Cooperation Framework (RCF) ===
Ministers in the Fourth Ministerial Conference agreed that an inclusive but non-binding Regional Cooperation Framework (RCF) would provide a more effective way for states to cooperate in addressing irregular movement in the region.

Under the RCF, member states are encouraged to enter into arrangements that:

- promote human life and dignity;
- seek to build capacity to process mixed flows and where appropriate utilize available resources;
- reflect principles of burden sharing and collective responsibility while respecting sovereignty and the national security of concerned States;
- seek to address root causes of irregular movement and promote population stabilization wherever possible;
- promote orderly, legal migration and provide appropriate opportunities for regular migration;
- avoid creating pull factors to or within the region;
- undermine the people smuggling model and create disincentives for irregular movement, and may include, in appropriate circumstances transfer and readmission;
- support and promote increased information exchange while respecting confidentiality and upholding the privacy of affected persons.

=== Regional Support Office (RSO) ===
The Regional Support Office (RSO) was established in 2012 to operationalise the Regional Cooperation Framework (RCF) developed at the Fourth Ministerial Conference in 2011.

The RSO acts as a focal point for States in the RCF for:

- information sharing between States;
- capacity building and exchange of best practices;
- accumulation of common technical resources; and
- logistical, administrative, operational and coordination support for joint projects.

These have yielded in concrete outcomes such as partnerships with Jakarta Centre for Law and Enforcement Cooperation (JCLEC), the implementation of a Forward Work Plan 2015–17, development of Policy and Reference Guides, and the Regional Strategic Road Map.

The Bali Process Co-Chairs oversee the work done in the RSO along with consultation from UNHCR and IOM. Two RSO Co-Managers from Australia and Indonesia manage the day-to-day operation of the office. They report on a biannual basis to the Co-Chairs, with consultations from UNHCR and IOM. They also report to the Steering Group, the Ad Hoc Group and the full Bali Process membership during Senior Officials’ Meetings and Regional Ministerial Conferences.

The RSO's activities, governance, and outcomes are reviewed after every 18–24 months in operation. In the 11th AHG Senior Official's meeting, the AHG commended the RSO's ongoing work and recognised its practical value.

The office is located in Bangkok, Thailand.

== Regional Immigration Liaison Officer Network (RILON) ==
In 2011, AHG members further developed the Regional Immigration Liaison Officer Network, or RILON in order to improve information sharing opportunities. RILON is co-chaired by Australia and Sri Lanka. It is currently established in Bangkok, Canberra, Colombo, Kuala Lumpur and New Delhi.

This is an initiative of the Technical Experts Working Group on Irregular Movements aimed to help alleviate information sharing between countries in the region, as ‘lack of technical information and intelligence sharing about irregular movements through immigration borders’ was underlined as a major obstacle in combating these issues during a meeting in Sri Lanka in May 2011.

== Recent meetings ==
Recent meetings of the Bali process forum have been held alternately in Indonesia and in Australia. (A comprehensive set of ministerial conference and meetings statements is at the Meetings page of the official Bali Process website.)

2011

- Fourth Regional Ministerial Conference in March in Bali.
- Fifth meeting of Ad Hoc Officials Group (October, Sydney).

2012

- Sixth meeting of Ad Hoc Official Group (June, Bali).
- Commemoration of the 10th year of the Bali Process (November, Bali).

2013

- Seventh meeting of Ad Hoc Officials Group (March, Sydney).
- Senior officials meeting in April in Bali.
- Fifth Regional Ministerial Conference in April in Bali.

2014

- Special Conference on "The Irregular Movement of People" in April in Jakarta
- Eighth meeting of Ad Hoc Officials Group (August, Canberra).

2015

- Ninth meeting of Ad Hoc Officials Group (May, Auckland).

2016

- Tenth meeting of Ad Hoc Officials Group (Bangkok, February).
- Senior officials meeting (Bali, March)
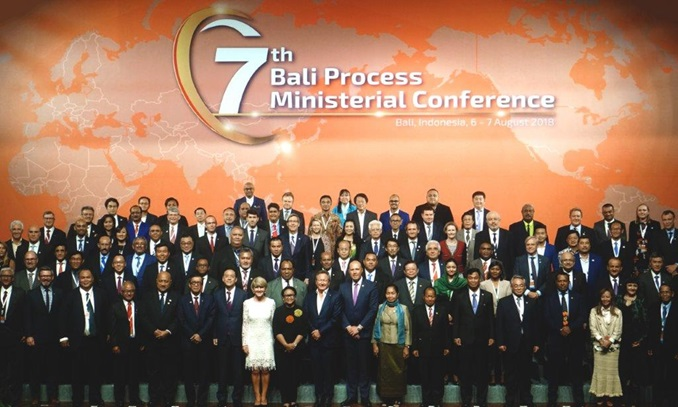
- Members of the 2018 Bali Process Ministerial Conference in Nusa Dua, Bali, Indonesia.
  Sixth Regional Ministerial Conference (Bali, March).
- Eleventh meeting of Ad Hoc Officials Group (Colombo, November).

2017

- Inaugural launch of the Bali Process Government and Business Forum in Perth (the Perth Forum), Western Australia.
- Third Annual Meeting of the Bali Process Trafficking in Persons Working Group in Bali, Indonesia (25 May)
- Second Meeting of National Training Directors in Semarang, Indonesia (18-20 July)

2018

- Seventh Regional Ministerial Conference including the Government and Business Forum (Bali, August).
- Senior Officials meeting (Bali, August).

== The Bali Process Government and Business Forum (GABF) ==
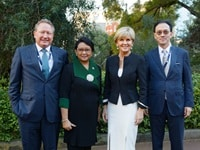
Co-Chairs Andrew Forrest, Retno LP Marsudi, Julie Bishop & Eddy Sariaatmadja at the Perth forum

At the Sixth Bali Process Ministerial Conference of March 2016, Ministers recognized the need to engage the private sector to combat human trafficking, forced labour, worst forms of child labour and related exploitation.

In 2017, the Bali Process was expanded to include the private sector by launching the Bali Process Government and Business Forum in Perth, Western Australia. Andrew Forrest, chairman of Fortescue and Eddy Sariaatmadja, founder and chairman of Emtek, were appointed as the joint Business Co-Chairs from Australia and Indonesia respectively. The Walk Free Foundation is the Forum's secretariat, and maintains an online business hub for all stakeholders.

In August 2018, the Second Government and Business Forum was held in Nusa Dua, Indonesia alongside the Seventh Bali Process Ministerial Conference. Ministers confirmed the Forum as a permanent additional track to the Bali Process and endorsed the "AAA Recommendations" put forward by business delegates. The Forum is closed to the public, but written statements from government and business are published online.

=== Attendees ===
The Business Co-Chairs invite influential business leaders from across the participating member states of the Bali Process, typically at Chairperson or chief executive officer level as Heads of Business Delegation to attend the Forums. Lists of participating businesses are regularly maintained and updated by the Secretariat online.

==== 2017 ====
- Heads of delegations (Government and Business)
- Business Leaders biographies

==== 2018 ====
- Heads of delegations (Government and Business)
- Business Leaders biographies

Selected Global Business Partners, being typically global brands and businesses operating within the Indo-Pacific, are also invited to participate the Forum and ongoing workshops throughout the year. In 2018, Global Business Partners included Adidas, Asics, Ikea and Mars.

=== Expert Panel ===
The Expert Panel to the Government and Business Forum consists of civil society groups, international organisations, consultants and academics from across the world. They play an important role by critically reviewing and analyzing the recommendations prepared by the Secretariat following the consultations with business and government. Participating organisations include

- Asia Pacific Forum
- Business & Human Rights Resource Centre
- Coventry University
- Freedom Fund
- Global Compact Network Australia
- Global Reporting Initiative
- Issara Institute
- Institute for Human Rights & Business
- International Labour Organization
- International Organization for Migration
- International Organisation of Employers
- Know the Chain
- Minderoo Foundation
- NYU Centre for Human Rights
- Responsible Business Alliance
- +Valorum
- Verite
- World Business Council for Sustainable Development

=== Meetings ===
Meetings of the Government and Business Forum have been held alternately in Indonesia and Australia, together with a series of ongoing regional workshops.

==== 2017 ====
- Singapore Consultations (4-5 July)
- Melbourne Consultation (14 July)
- Hong Kong Consultation (24 July)
- Inaugural Government and Business Forum launch (24-25 August, Perth)

==== 2018 ====
- Gulf Region Consultation (12 February, Dubai)
- South East Asia Consultations (20 March, Kuala Lumpur; 22 March, Bangkok)
- Global Partners Consultation (13 April, London)
- Pacific Consultation (14 May, Sydney)
- Bali Process Ministerial Conference; Second Government and Business Forum (6-7 August, Nusa Dua)

=== AAA Recommendations ===
At the 2018 Nusa Dua Forum, the AAA Recommendations put forward by the Business Co-Chairs were endorsed by government and business. This is a significant milestone, being the first major policy document agreed between the private and public sector to tackle issues of modern slavery and related exploitation in the region.

The Acknowledge, Act and Advance Recommendations (AAA Recommendations) set out a pathway for both business and government to contribute to the eradication of these transnational crimes. The AAA Recommendations recognise that businesses and countries represented within the GABF come from diverse backgrounds and need to be implemented according to specific contexts and capacities.

To contribute effectively to the eradication of these transnational crimes, business and government need to acknowledge the scale of the problem, act to strengthen and implement policy and legal frameworks and advance efforts over the long term. This should include clear and consistent standards for ethical recruitment and treatment of workers, supply chain transparency and redress mechanisms.

- Acknowledge encourages deeper understanding by business and government of the scale of, and challenges associated with these transnational crimes. These crimes also undermine economic growth by contributing to inefficient labour markets, depressing wage rates and causing significant social costs. Consumer choice is also increasingly driven by ethical considerations.
- Act encourages businesses to implement ethical business practices and governments to strengthen policy and legislative frameworks. Clear and consistent policies and legislation also offer an attractive investment destination for business. Consistency across jurisdictions will encourage business to act.
- Advance recognises that the GABF is at a pivotal stage of development. The GABF's Business Co-Chairs and Secretariat will develop a governance framework that ensures the ongoing sustainability and effectiveness of the Forum.

== Impacts on domestic legislation for participating countries ==
The effectiveness of the forum relies in part on a states' domestic implementation of Bali Process measures.

=== Australia ===
Australia has led the way in regional efforts to prevent and counter people smuggling and trafficking mainly through the Bali Process. Along with China, it has devised model legislation to assist other countries in implementing the criminalisation of people smuggling in their domestic law. The model law was presented in 2003 and eighteen regional countries have made use of the model legislation. Nineteen states now have legislation in place against people smuggling.

=== New Zealand ===
In 2009, Cabinet approved New Zealand's Plan of Action to prevent people trafficking, with three main focus areas: prevention, prosecution, and protection. New Zealand continues to support ongoing work in the most affected countries as well as multilateral agencies in the region.

=== Indonesia ===
Indonesia has ratified the UN Convention against Transnational Organised Crime in its implementation of Law No. 5 of 2009. It has also enacted national legislation against people smuggling as seen in Law No. 21 of 2007. Since the legislation commenced, there has been an increase of trafficking convictions, from 83 in 2004 to 291 in 2008. It has also enacted Law No. 6 of 2011 concerning the criminal network in illegal immigration, amending the Law No. 9 of 1992.

=== Malaysia ===
Malaysia has enacted a comprehensive Anti-Trafficking in Persons Act 2010 amending the previous 2007 Act. It has also created a Special Unit on Anti Trafficking in Person in respective enforcement agencies such as the Immigration Department, Royal Malaysia Customs and the Maritime Enforcement Agency.

It has also established shelters for victims of trafficking.

== Criticisms ==
Because of its nature as an informal, non-binding forum for discussion, measuring the outcomes and achievements of the Bali Process in absolute terms is not possible. However, in a 2009 report by Indonesia Delegation, it praises the informal and non-binding principles of the Bali Process as it ‘incurs the means of being flexible in the approach towards these challenges.'

=== Bali Process response to the Andaman refugee crisis ===
In May 2015, more than 25,000 people fled Myanmar and Bangladesh by boat, around 8,000 stranded at sea and 370 casualties in what is known as the Andaman Sea crisis. The role that the Bali Process played in this was very limited.

The Indonesian Foreign Minister Retno Marsudi has stated that the failure of the Bali Process in responding to the Andaman crisis “must not happen again.” She acknowledged that the Bali Process was unable to address the sudden irregular migration flow in the Andaman Sea. Former Indonesian Foreign Minister Dr Hassan Wirajuda who played a critical role in establishing the Bali Process, has suggested that the co-chair roles may need to be rotated, as they have monopolised the position since 2002. He attributes the failure to respond to the different degrees of interest of the member states, including the co-chairs.

In 2015, a year after the crisis, the Bali Process ministers conducted a Review of the Response to the Andaman Sea Situation, which included lessons learned and recommendations. The need for clear communication between maritime officials, and lack of capabilities to facilitate cooperation were seen as critical.

==== Accountability and reporting ====
In the review, the AHG recognised that it has been a challenge to measure progress on agreements and commitments made in meetings due to ‘lack of centralised monitoring and reporting.’ To address this, the Task Force on Planning and Preparedness was made. They are to be held accountable for supervising progress in implementing the action plans agreed in the Review, identifying major barriers, and reporting back to the AHG within 12 months.
