= List of radio stations in Hidalgo (state) =

This is a list of radio stations in the Mexican state of Hidalgo, which can be sorted by their call signs, frequencies, location, ownership, names, and programming formats.

Radio stations in Hidalgo
Call sign	Frequency	Location	Owner	Name	Format
XENQ-AM	640 AM	Singuilucan	XENQ Radio Tulancingo, S.A. de C.V.	NQ Radio	News/talk
XECPHH-AM	1010 AM	Huejutla de Reyes	Gobierno del Estado de Hidalgo	Vocero Huasteco	Regional Mexican
XERD-AM	1240 AM	Pachuca	Red Central Radiofónica, S. de R.L. de C.V.	La Comadre	Regional Mexican
XECCHA-AM	1270 AM	Ixmiquilpan–Santiago de Anaya	Radiodifusoras Mars, S.A. de C.V.	—	—
XECCCL-AM	1360 AM	Atotonilco de Tula	Radiodifusoras Mars, S.A. de C.V.	—	—
XECARH-AM	1480 AM	Cardonal	Instituto Nacional de los Pueblos Indígenas	La Voz del Pueblo Hñahñu	Regional Mexican
XECCAT-AM	1520 AM	Apan	Radiodifusoras Mars, S.A. de C.V.	—	—
XECCAZ-AM	1570 AM	Tepeapulco	Radiodifusoras Mars, S.A. de C.V.	—	—
XHCARH-FM	89.1 FM	Cardonal	Instituto Nacional de los Pueblos Indígenas	La Voz del Pueblo Hñahñu	Indigenous radio
XHNQ-FM	90.1 FM	Singuilucan	XENQ Radio Tulancingo, S.A. de C.V.	NQ Radio	News/talk
XHCY-FM	90.9 FM	Huejutla de Reyes	Telecomunicaciones de La Huasteca, S.A. de C.V.	XHCY 90.9	Regional Mexican
XHCPDY-FM	91.1 FM	Jacala de Ledezma	Gobierno del Estado de Hidalgo	La Voz de la Sierra Gorda	Public radio
XHPECI-FM	91.1 FM	Tulancingo	Universidad Autónoma del Estado de Hidalgo	Radio UAEH Tulancingo	University radio
XHSCBY-FM	91.9 FM	Jacala de Ledezma	Radio Comunicación Tzacualli, A.C.	La Jacalteca	Community radio
XHPK-FM	92.5 FM	Pachuca	Corporación Radiofónica de Pachuca, S. de R.L. de C.V.	Mix	English adult contemporary
XHCPDD-FM	92.7 FM	Huejutla de Reyes	Gobierno del Estado de Hidalgo	La Huasteca	Public radio
XHSCCP-FM	93.5 FM	Zacualtipán	Radio Sultana de la Sierra, A.C.	Radio Sultana de la Sierra	Community radio
XHPECJ-FM	94.1 FM	Tulancingo	Grupo Independiente de Mujeres de Mixquiahuala, A.C.	—	—
XHCPDZ-FM	94.1 FM	Tlanchinol	Gobierno del Estado de Hidalgo	—	—
XHMY-FM	95.7 FM	Mineral del Monte	XHMY-FM, S.A. de C.V.	Radio Disney	Contemporary hit radio
XHCPDX-FM	96.5 FM	Ixmiquilpan	Gobierno del Estado de Hidalgo	Radio Mezquital	Public radio
XHSIAV-FM	96.9 FM	Chapulhuacán	Comunidad Indígena de Chapulhuacán	—	—
XHQB-FM	97.1 FM	Tulancingo	Emisoras Miled, S.A. de C.V.	Super Stereo Miled	News/talk
XHDCC-FM	97.3 FM	San Ildefonso	Desarrollo Comunitario y Cultural Ma Nguhe, A.C.	Gi Ne Ga Bu He Tho	Indigenous radio
XHSCKP-FM	99.1 FM	Huasca de Ocampo	Radio La Campesina de Huasca, A.C.	La Banda Sin Fronteras	Community radio
XHUZH-FM	99.5 FM	Zimapán	Universidad Autónoma del Estado de Hidalgo	Radio UAEH Zimapán	University radio
XHHRH-FM	99.7 FM	Huejutla de Reyes	Universidad Autónoma del Estado de Hidalgo	Radio UAEH Huejutla	University radio
XHUAH-FM	99.7 FM	Pachuca de Soto	Universidad Autónoma del Estado de Hidalgo	Radio UAEH Pachuca	University radio
XHBTH-FM	99.7 FM	San Bartolo Tutotepec	Universidad Autónoma del Estado de Hidalgo	Radio UAEH San Bartolo	University radio
XHIDO-FM	100.5 FM	Tula	Súper Stereo de Tula, S.A. de C.V.	Super Stereo	Regional Mexican
XHPECW-FM	102.1 FM	Actopan	Universidad Autónoma del Estado de Hidalgo	Radio UAEH Actopan	University radio
XHTNO-FM	102.9 FM	Tulancingo	Ultradigital Tulancingo, S.A. de C.V.	Ultra 102.9	Contemporary hit radio
XHSCBZ-FM	103.5 FM	Santiago de Anaya y El Águila	Ximai Comunicaciones, A.C.	Radio Ximai	Community radio
XHCPDW-FM	103.7 FM	Huichapan	Universidad Autónoma del Estado de Hidalgo	—	—
XHRD-FM	104.5 FM	Pachuca	Red Central Radiofónica, S. de R.L. de C.V.	La Comadre	Regional Mexican
XHSIBZ-FM	104.7 FM	Jaltocán	Comunidad Indígena Náhuatl, Asentada en Jaltocán, Hidalgo	Xaltokaj Radio	Community radio
XHSCJZ-FM	105.9 FM	Metztitlán	Radio Metztitlán Comunitaria, A.C.	—	—
XHPCA-FM	106.1 FM	Pachuca	Grupo Radial Siete, S.A. de C.V.	Radio Crystal	Regional Mexican
XHSCFX-FM	106.1 FM	Tecozautla	La Voz de Tecozautla, A.C.	Eben-Ezer Radio	Christian
XHQH-FM	106.7 FM	Ixmiquilpan	Radio Milenium Orbital, S.A. de C.V.	Ke Buena	Regional Mexican
XHSCIO-FM	107.7 FM	Ahuatitla	Radio Ahuatl, A.C.	Radio Ahuatl	Community
XHIXMI-FM	107.7 FM	Ixmiquilpan	Familia Brillante, A.C.	Radio Brillante	Christian

== Defunct stations ==
- Stations owned by Radio y Televisión de Hidalgo:
  - XHLLV-FM 89.3 Tula de Allende
  - XHZG-FM 94.9 Ixmiquilpan
  - XHBCD-FM 98.1 Pachuca
  - XHHUI-FM 103.7 Huichapan
  - XHPEC-FM 103.9 San Bartolo Tutotepec
  - XHAPU-FM 106.9 Tepeapulco
