= XHNQ-FM =

XHNQ-FM may refer to:

- XHNQ-FM (Guerrero) in Acapulco, Exa 99.3 FM
- XHNQ-FM (Hidalgo) in Tulancingo, NQ 90.1 FM
