= Slavery in the 21st century =

The estimated prevalence of modern slavery as a percentage of the population, by country, according to the Global Slavery Index published by the Walk Free Foundation.

Contemporary slavery, also sometimes known as modern slavery or neo-slavery, refers to slavery that continues to exist in the 21st century. Estimates of the number of enslaved people range from around 38 million to 49.6 million, depending on the method used to form the estimate and the definition of slavery being used. The estimated number of enslaved people is debated, as there is no universally agreed definition of modern slavery; those in slavery are often difficult to identify, and adequate statistics are often not available.

The International Labour Organization estimates that, by their definitions, over 40 million people are in some form of slavery today. Some 24.9 million people are in forced labor, of whom 16 million people are exploited in the private sector such as domestic work, construction or agriculture, 4.8 million people in forced sexual exploitation, and 4 million people in forced labour imposed by state authorities. An additional 15.4 million people are in forced marriages.

== Definition ==
The Office to Monitor and Combat Trafficking in Persons, an agency of the United States Department of State, says that "'modern slavery', 'trafficking in persons', and 'human trafficking' have been used as umbrella terms for the act of recruiting, harbouring, transporting, providing or obtaining a person for compelled labour or commercial sex acts through the use of force, fraud, or coercion". Besides these, a number of different terms are used in the US federal Victims of Trafficking and Violence Protection Act of 2000 and the United Nations Protocol to Prevent, Suppress and Punish Trafficking in Persons, especially Women and Children, including "involuntary servitude", "slavery" or "practices similar to slavery", "debt bondage", and "forced labor".

According to American professor Kevin Bales, co-founder and former president of the non-governmental organization and advocacy group Free the Slaves, modern slavery occurs "when a person is under the control of another person who applies violence and force to maintain that control, and the goal of that control is exploitation". The impact of slavery is expanded when targeted at vulnerable groups such as children.

According to the Walk Free Foundation, "Modern slavery includes forced labour, forced or servile marriage, debt bondage, forced commercial sexual exploitation, human trafficking, slavery-like practices, and the sale and exploitation of children." With this definition as the basis of its research, Walk Free's Global Slavery Index in 2021 estimated that there were about 49.6 million slaves around the world.

As mentioned above, the definitions used by different organizations have notable variation in approaches and purposes. On one hand, the U.S. Government definition by the Office to Monitor and Combat Trafficking in Persons employs a legal definition, focusing more on the different types of trafficking mechanisms and coercion with the goal of providing an explanation on how and when each situation should be treated as a criminal offense. By contrast, the concept under the non-governmental organization Free the Slaves, has more of an advocacy approach designed to raise awareness about the problematic with a persuasive tone, emphasizing more on the conditions of exploitation and the lack of autonomy, including a wider range of practices that can fall under this terminology.

Bales warned that, because slavery is officially abolished everywhere, the practice is illegal, and more hidden from the public and authorities. This makes it impossible to obtain exact figures from primary sources. The best that can be done is to estimate based on secondary sources, such as UN investigations, newspaper articles, government reports, and figures from NGOs.

Modern slavery persists for many of the same reasons older variations did: it is an economically beneficial practice for enslavers, despite the ethical concerns. The problem has been able to escalate in recent years due to the disposability of slaves and the fact that the cost of slaves has dropped significantly.

== Causes ==
Since traditional slavery such as chattel slavery has been officially abolished in every country on Earth and is illegal, enslavement no longer revolves around legal ownership, but around illegal control. Two fundamental changes are the move away from the forward purchase of slave labor, and the existence of slaves as an employment category. While the statistics suggest that the 'market' for exploitative labor is booming, the notion that humans are purposefully sold and bought from an existing pool is outdated. While such transactions do still occur, in contemporary situations people become trapped in slavery-like conditions in various ways.

Modern slavery is often seen as a by-product of poverty. In countries that lack education and effectively implemented rule of law, poor societal structure can create an environment that fosters the acceptance and propagation of slavery. Slavery is most prevalent in impoverished countries and those with vulnerable minority communities, though it also exists in developed countries. Tens of thousands toil in slave-like conditions in industries such as mining, farming, and factories, producing goods for domestic consumption or export to more prosperous nations.

In the older form of slavery, slave-owners spent more on getting slaves. It was more difficult for them to be disposed of. The cost of keeping them healthy was considered a better investment than getting another slave to replace them. In modern slavery people are easier to get at a lower price so replacing them when exploiters run into problems becomes easier. Slaves are then used in areas where they could easily be hidden while also creating a profit for the exploiter.

Modern slavery can be quite profitable, and some governing bodies tacitly allow it, despite being outlawed by international treaties such as the Supplementary Convention on the Abolition of Slavery and local laws. Total annual revenues from human trafficking was estimated in 2014 to be over $150 billion, although profits are substantially lower. American slaves in 1809 were sold for around the equivalent of US$40,000 in 2017 money. In 2017, a slave can be bought for $90–$100.

Bales explains, in the context of modern slavery, "This is an economic crime ... People do not enslave others to be mean to them; they do it to make a profit."

Over the past 50 years, the shift of industrial production from the Global North to the Global South has made global trade and supply chains central to understanding the causes of modern slavery. Research shows responsibility lies not only with manufacturers/suppliers in the Global South but also with retailers from the Global North whose purchasing practices contribute to the problem. A survey of 1,000 Bangladeshi garment factories producing for Western fast-fashion retailers found that most faced unfair practices, including cancelled orders, price cuts, refusal to pay and delayed payments, which burdened supplier factories, squeezed their profits, undermined factories’ decent working conditions, and significantly made it harder for many factories to pay even minimum wages during the COVID-19 pandemic. Another related qualitative study found that retailers’ unfair purchasing practices, including cancellation of orders and payment delays, which are common in normal times, exacerbated the workers’ vulnerability, exploitation and forced labour conditions during the COVID-19 pandemic—all are basic elements of modern slavery.

== Types ==
=== Slavery by descent and chattel slavery ===
Slavery by descent, also called chattel slavery, is the form most often associated with the word "slavery". In chattel slavery, the enslaved person is considered the personal property (chattel) of someone else, and can usually be bought and sold. It stems historically either from conquest, where a conquered person is enslaved, as in the Roman Empire or Ottoman Empire, or from slave trading, as in the Saharan or Atlantic slave trades.

Since the 2014 Civil War in Libya, and the subsequent breakdown of law and order, there have been reports of enslaved migrants being sold in public, including open slave markets in the country.

Mauritania has a long history with slavery. Chattel slavery was formally made illegal in the country but the laws against it have gone largely unenforced. It is estimated that around 90,000 people (over 2% of Mauritania's population) are slaves.

Debt bondage can also be passed down to descendants, like chattel slavery.

Those trapped in the system of sexual slavery in the modern world are often effectively chattel, especially when they are forced into prostitution.

=== Government-forced labor ===
Government-forced labor, also known as state-sponsored labor, is defined by the International Labor Organization as situations where people "are coerced to work through the use of violence or intimidation, or by more subtle means such as accumulated debt, retention of identity papers or threats of denunciation to immigration authorities".

In Eritrea, an estimated 300,000 to 400,000 people are in an indefinite military service program which amounts to mass slavery, according to UN investigators. Their report also found sexual slavery and other forced labor.

In North Korea, the government forces many people to work for the state, both inside and outside North Korea itself, sometimes for many years. The 2018 Global Slavery Index estimated that 2.8 million people were slaves in the country. The value of all the labor done by North Koreans for the government is estimated at US$975 million, with dulgyeokdae (youth workers) forced to undertake dangerous construction work, and inminban (women and girl workers) forced to make clothing in sweatshops. The workers are often unpaid. Additionally, North Korea's army of 1.2 million conscripted soldiers is often made to work on construction projects unrelated to defense, including building private villas for the elite. The government has had as many as 100,000 workers abroad.

In Uzbekistan, for example, the government coerces students and state workers to harvest cotton, of which the country is a main exporter, every year, forcing them to abandon their other responsibilities in the process. In this example the use of students, including those in primary, secondary, and higher education, means that child labor is also prominent. Uzbekistan's government has worked to reduce the forced labor in recent years, and in March 2022 a major boycott of Uzbek cotton was lifted, upon reports that coerced labor had been almost eliminated.

=== Prison labor ===
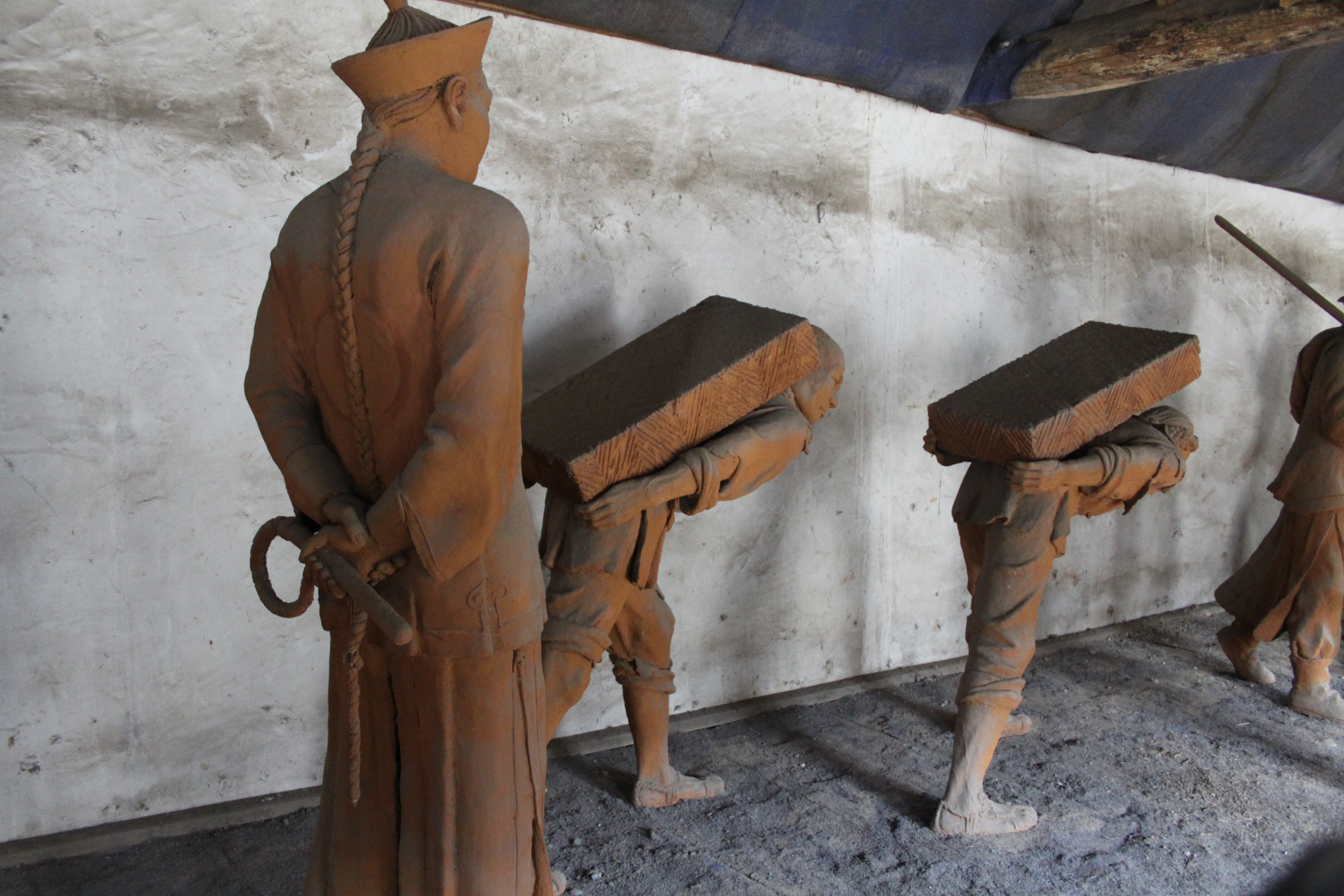
Neixiang Yamen Jail – Forced Labor

In 1865, the United States ratified the 13th Amendment to the United States Constitution, which banned slavery and involuntary servitude "except as punishment for a crime whereof the party shall have been duly convicted", providing a legal basis for slavery, now referred to as penal labor, to continue in the country. Historically, this led to the system of convict leasing which still primarily affects African-Americans. The Prison Policy Initiative, an American criminal justice think tank, cites the 2020 US prison population at being 2.3 million individuals, and nearly all able-bodied inmates work in some fashion.

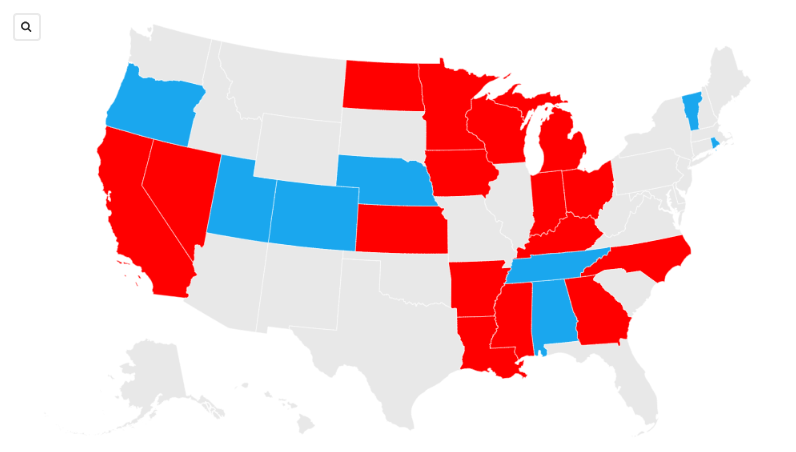
Map of US states where prison labor is permitted in the state constitution as of November 2022 permitted forbidden no mention in constitution

In Texas, Georgia, Alabama and Arkansas, prisoners are not paid at all for their work. In other states, prisoners are paid between $0.12 and $1.15 per hour (as of 2013). Federal Prison Industries paid inmates an average of $0.90 per hour in 2017. Inmates who refuse to work may be indefinitely remanded into solitary confinement, or have family visitation revoked. From 2010 to 2015 and again in 2016 and in 2018, some prisoners in the US refused to work, protesting for better pay, better conditions, and for the end of forced labor. Strike leaders were punished with indefinite solitary confinement.

Forced prison labor occurs in both public/government-run prisons and private prisons. CoreCivic and GEO Group constitute half of the market share of private prisons, and they made a combined revenue of $3.5 billion in 2015. The value of all the labor done by inmates in the United States is estimated to be in the billions. In California in 2018, 2,500 incarcerated workers fought wildfires for $1 per hour through the CDCR's Conservation Camp Program, which saved the state as much as $100 million a year.

In China's system of labor prisons (formerly called laogai), millions of prisoners have been subject to forced, unpaid labor. The laogai system is estimated to currently house between 500,000 and 2 million prisoners. In parallel with laogai, China operated the smaller re-education through labor system of prisons up until 2013. In addition to both of these, China is also reportedly operating forced labor camps in Xinjiang, imprisoning hundreds of thousands (possibly as many as a million) of Uyghurs, as well as a smaller number of Tibetans and political dissidents.

In the UK, there are three key types of prison labour. First, prisoners can be made to maintain the jail—for example cleaning, maintenance, or working in the kitchens. Second, prisoners have the option to do mundane/repetitive work for external companies; this includes tasks such as bagging nails and packing boxes. Finally, prisoners can work in specialist workshops run by third parties, in which the prisoners can do tasks such as building window-frames, graphic design and other tasks requiring some form of machinery. A 2013 report suggest prisoners in the UK can earn as little as £10 for a 40-hour week's worth of work.

In Australia, prison labour occurs in at least New South Wales, Victoria, Queensland and the Northern Territory. Some prisoners work for private companies. As of 2017, in NSW some are paid as little as $0.82 per hour, while in the NT some are paid as much as $16 per hour (compared to $35 per hour for a regular union employee in the same job).

=== Bonded labor ===
Bonded labor, also known as debt bondage and peonage, occurs when people give themselves into slavery as a security against a loan or when they inherit a debt from a relative. The cycle begins when people take extreme loans under the condition that they work off the debt. The "loan" is designed so that it can never be paid off, and is often passed down for generations. People become trapped in this system working ostensibly towards repayment though they are often forced to work far past the original amount they owe. They work under the force of threats and abuse. Sometimes the debts last a few years, and sometimes the debts are even passed onto future generations.

Bonded labor is used across a variety of industries in order to produce products for consumption around the world. It is most common in India, Pakistan and Nepal.

In India, the majority of bonded laborers are Dalits (Untouchables) and Adivasis (tribal people). Puspal, a former brick kiln worker in Punjab, India, stated in an interview to antislavery.org; "We do not stop even if we are ill – what if our debt is increasing? So we don't dare to stop." In India, when compared to the price of land, paid labor or oxen, the price of slaves is currently 95% less than it was in the past.

=== Forced migrant labor ===
People may be enticed to migrate with the promise of work, only to have their documents seized and be forced to work under the threat of violence to them or their families. Undocumented immigrants may also be taken advantage of, as without legal residency they often have no legal recourse. Along with sex slavery, this is the form of slavery most often encountered in wealthy countries such as the United States, in Western Europe, and in the Middle East.

In the United Arab Emirates, some foreign workers are exploited and more or less enslaved. The majority of the UAE resident population are foreign migrant workers rather than local Emirati citizens, with there being over 1.7 million migrant workers, making up 90% of the constructive workforce. The country has a kafala system, which is associated with outdated laws and procedures, which ties migrant workers to local Emirati sponsors with very little government oversight. This has often led to forced labor and human trafficking. As of 2017, the UAE is pushing towards a better labor system as it has recently passed laws to protect the rights of domestic workers.

Allegations of forced migrant labor have been highlighted within the preparations of stadiums for the Qatar FIFA 2022 World Cup. There have been over 6,500 recorded migrant deaths during the construction of the stadiums. Amnesty International researched into the construction of the stadiums and found 3,200 migrant workers work on the stadiums everyday, in which at least 224 of them have reported abusive and exploitative behaviour. Workers reported issues of expensive recruitment fees, poor living conditions, false salaries, delayed payments of salary, being unable to leave the stadium or camp, being unable to leave the country or change jobs, being threatened, and most importantly forced labour.

In October 2019 Qatar abolished Kafala system and introduced basic minimum wage and wage protection system for migrant workers. Under these reforms workers can change jobs without employer's permission and are now paid basic minimum wage regardless of their nationality. The basic minimum wage is set to 1,000 QAR and allowances for food and accommodation must be provided by employers which is 300 QAR and 500 QAR respectively. Moreover, Qatar introduced a wage protection system to ensure the employers are complying with the reforms. The wage protection system monitors the workers in the private sector. This new system has reduced wage abuses and disputes among migrant labours.

Additionally in the UK two individuals in Kent were found guilty of trafficking six Lithuanian men. They were forced to work back to back 8 hour shifts as chicken catchers. Further investigations into this highlighted that the farms these individuals were working at were supplying eggs to large supermarket chains such as Tesco's, Asda and M&S. Vietnamese teenagers are trafficked to the United Kingdom and forced to work in illegal cannabis farms. When police raid the cannabis farms, trafficked victims are typically sent to prison.

In the United States, various industries have been known to take advantage of forced migrant labor. During the 2010 New York State Fair, 19 migrants who were in the country legally from Mexico were forced to work in a food truck and essentially enslaved by their employer. The men were paid around ten percent of what they were promised, worked far longer days than they were contracted to, and would be deported if they quit their job, as this would be a violation of their visas. A 2021 multi-agency federal investigation dubbed Operation Blooming Onion revealed that a years-long human trafficking ring forced migrant workers from Mexico and Central America into "modern day slavery" on various agricultural sites in southern Georgia. The indictment alleges that in the fields the migrant workers were forced at gunpoint to dig for onions with their bare hands for 20 cents per bucket. They were held in work camps surrounded by electrified fences and subjected to squalid and crammed living conditions, with no access to safe food or water.

Reports of migrant abuse and neglect surfaced in Kenya in early September 2022, when pictures of a frail looking young Kenyan worker from Saudi Arabia, Diana Chepkemoi went viral. Following growing pressure from the public, the government repatriated Chepkemoi along with a few other domestic workers facing a similar fate in the Kingdom. Among those rescued was Joy Simiyu, who went to Saudi Arabia to work as a domestic help, but within months returned to Kenya with a harrowing but known tale of abuse by her employer. According to reports, migrant housekeepers complained of being subjected to physical, mental as well as sexual abuse while working in the Gulf state.

=== Sex slavery ===
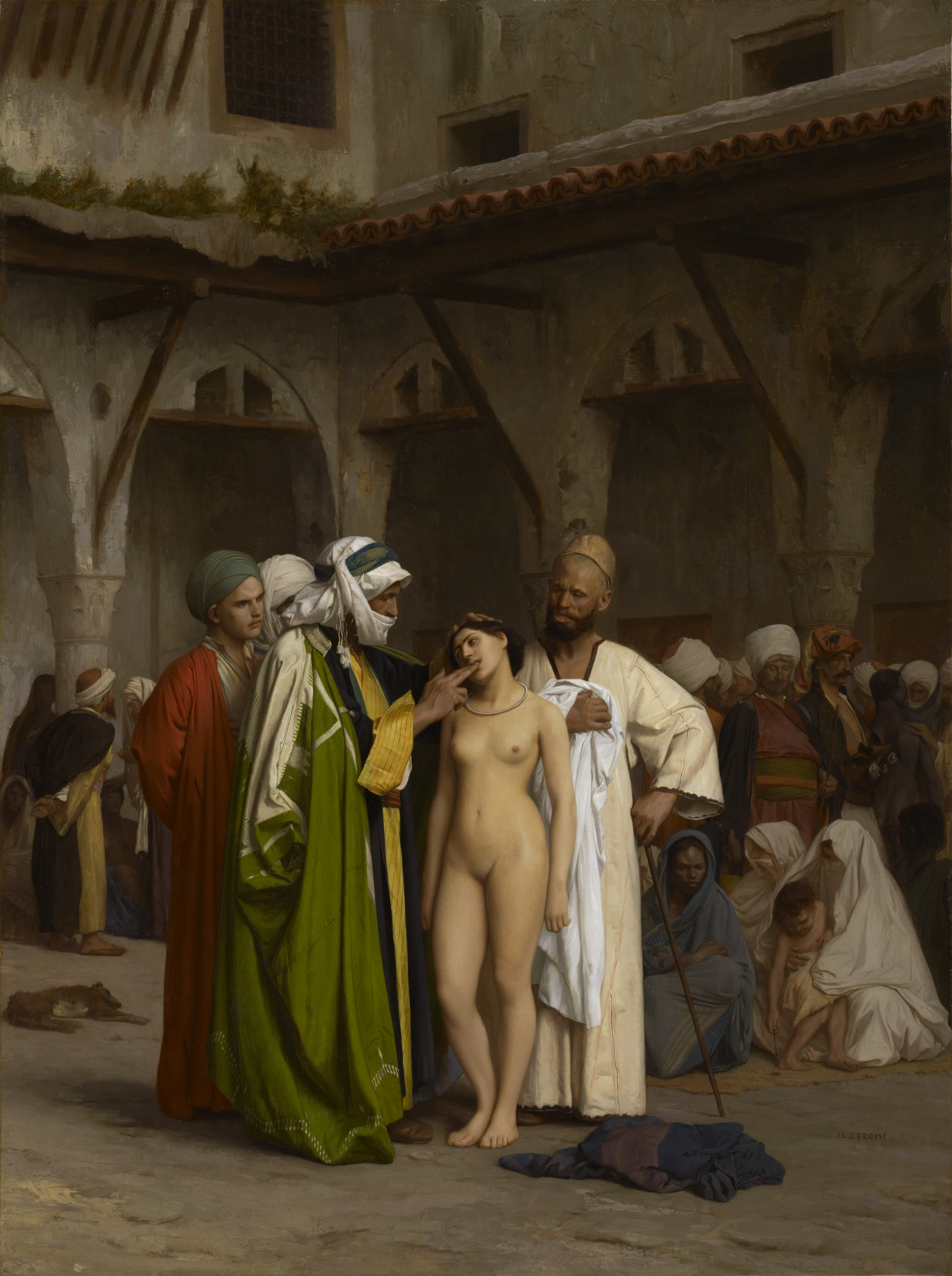
The Slave Market, by Jean-Léon Gérôme

Along with migrant slavery, forced prostitution is the form of slavery most often encountered in wealthy regions such as the United States, in Western Europe, and in the Middle East. It is the primary form of slavery in Eastern Europe and Southeast Asia, particularly in Moldova and Laos. Many child sex slaves are trafficked from these areas to the West and the Middle East. An estimated 20% of slaves to date are active in the sex industry. Sexual exploitation can also become a form of debt bondage when enslavers insist that victims work in the sex industry to pay for basic needs and transportation.

In 2005, the Gulf Times reported that boys from Nepal had been lured to India and enslaved for sex. Many of these boys had also been subject to male genital mutilation (castration).

Many of those who become victims of sex slavery initially do so willingly under the guise that they will be performing traditional sex work, only to become trapped for extended periods of time, such as those involved in Nigeria's human trafficking circuit.

=== Forced marriage and child marriage ===
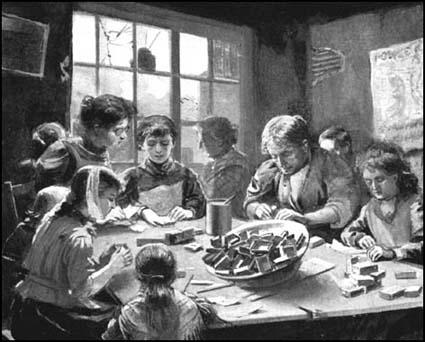
Illustration from the book The Child Slaves of Britain. Child slavery and forced labor continues to be a problem in the 21st century

Early or forced marriage is a form of slavery that affects millions of women and girls all over the world. When families cannot support their children, the daughters are often married off to the males of wealthier, more powerful families. These men are often significantly older than the girls. The females are forced into lives whose main purpose is to serve their husbands. This often fosters an environment for physical, verbal and sexual abuse.

The regions most affected by this problematic are usually those ruled by patriarchal systems with strict social norms, and countries with high poverty rates since marriage is seen as an efficient way to gain financial security for the girls and their families.

Forced marriages also happen in developed nations. In the United Kingdom there were 3,546 reports to the police of forced marriage over three years from 2014 to 2016.

In the United States over 200,000 minors were legally married from 2002 to 2017, with the youngest being only 10 years old. Most were married to adults. Currently 48 US states, as well as D.C. and Puerto Rico, allow marriage of minors as long as there is judicial consent, parental consent or if the minor is pregnant. In 2017–2018, several states began passing laws to either restrict child marriage or ban it altogether.

Bride-buying is the act of purchasing a bride as property, in a similar manner to chattel slavery. It can also be related to human trafficking.

=== Child labor ===
Children comprise about 12% of the slaves as of 2022 estimates. Although children can legally engage in certain forms of work, children can also be found in slavery or slavery-like situations; although child labor isn't considered slavery, it inevitably hinders their education. Forced begging is a common way that children are forced to participate in labor without their consent. Most are domestic workers or work in cocoa, cotton or fishing industries. Many are trafficked and sexually exploited. Forced child labor is the dominant form of slavery in Haiti.

In war-torn countries, children have been kidnapped and sold to political parties to use as child soldiers. Child soldiers are children who may be trafficked from their homes and forced or coerced by armed forces. The armed forces could be government armed forces, paramilitary organizations, or rebel groups. While in these groups the children may be forced to work as cooks, guards, servants or spies. It is common for both boys and girls to be sexually abused while in these groups.

Situations where young people work in unpaid internships have been likened to modern slavery.

=== Fishing industry ===
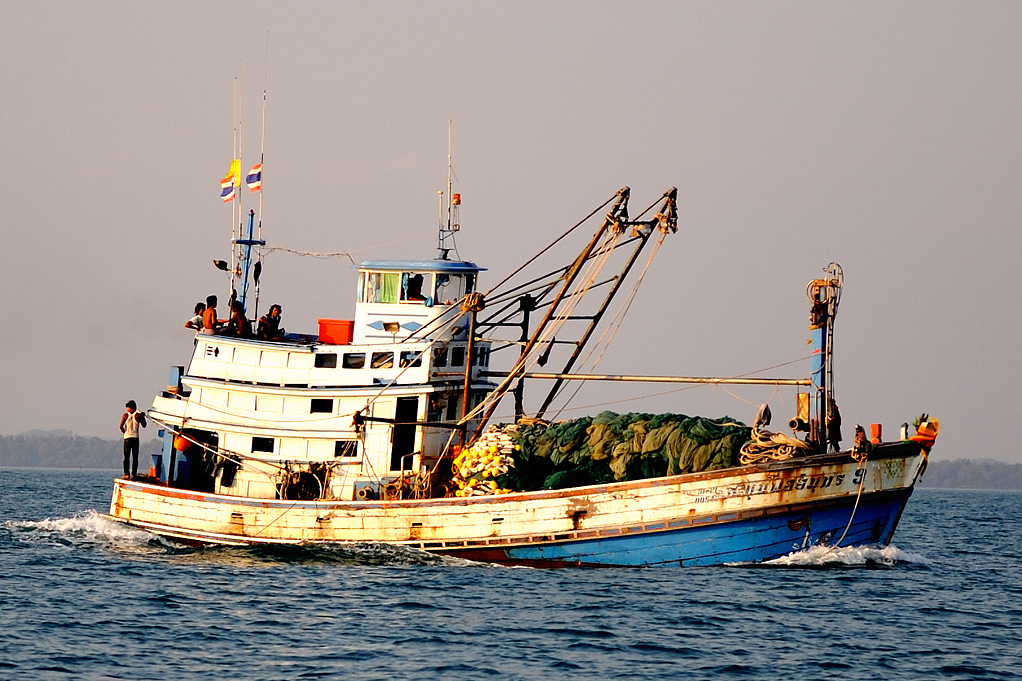
A fishing vessel flying under the flag of Thailand, where workers are known to sometimes be kept aboard ships for years while subject to forced labor.

According to Human Rights Watch, Thailand's billion-dollar fish export industry remains plagued with human rights maltreatment in spite of government vows to stamp out servitude in its angling industry. Human Rights Watch conducted interviews with 248 fishermen, it documented the forced labor of trafficked workers in the Thai fishing industry.

Trafficking victims are often tricked by brokers' false promises of "good" factory jobs, then forced onto fishing boats where they are trapped, bought and sold like livestock, and held against their will for months or years at a time, forced to work grueling 22-hour days in dangerous conditions. Those who resist or try to run away are beaten, tortured, and often killed. This is commonplace because of the disposability of unfree laborers.

Despite some improvements, the situation has not changed much since a large-scale survey of almost 500 fishers in 2012, that found almost one in five "reported working against their will with the penalty that would prevent them from leaving".

=== Forced begging ===
Victims of human trafficking can be made to beg on the streets with the earnings being given back to the traffickers. It has been suggested many children across Europe, Asia, Africa, Latin America and the Middle East are forced to beg on the streets.

As years pass by, the number of children forced to beg has exponentially increased. Children are more frequently forced since people are more likely to pay attention and help kids. Furthermore, in Bangkok, Thailand, it was discovered that children with disabilities earn much more than healthy children, so often times individuals are mutilated to generate more money.

=== Forced fraud ===
There are significant reports of forced fraud in Southeast Asia (Cambodia, Myanmar, or Laos). Currently, forced fraud activities are mainly found in fraud factories or fraud parks, notably in Southeast Asian countries, which involve human trafficking. Fraud factory victims are forced to scam internet users around the world into fraudulently buying cryptocurrencies or withdrawing cash, via social media and online dating apps. Trafficking victims' passports are confiscated, and they are threatened with organ harvesting or forced prostitution if they do not earn enough from scamming.

== Occupations ==
In addition to sex slavery, modern slaves are often forced to work in certain occupations. Common occupations include:

- Small-scale building work, such as laying driveways, and other labor.
- Car washing by hand
- Domestic servitude, sometimes with sexual exploitation.
- Nail salons (cosmetic). Many people are trafficked from Vietnam to the UK for this work.
- Fishing, mainly associated with Thailand's sea food industry.
- Manufacturing – Many prisoners in the US are forced to manufacture products as diverse as mattresses, spectacles, underwear, road signs, licence plates, and body armour.
- Agriculture and forestry – Prisoners in the United States and China are often forced to undertake farming and forestry work. See prison farm.
- In North Korea, dulgyeokdae (youth workers) are often forced to work in construction, and inminban (women workers) are forced to work in clothing sweatshops.

Signs that someone may have been forced into slavery include a lack of identity documents, lack of personal possessions, clothing that is unsuitable or has seen much wear, poor living conditions, a reluctance to make eye contact, unwillingness to talk, and unwillingness to seek help. In the UK, people are encouraged to report suspicions to a modern-slavery telephone helpline.

The European Parliament condemned, 386 – 236 with 59 abstentions, the humanitarian practice of sending Cuban doctors to fight the COVID-19 pandemic around the world as human trafficking and modern slavery.

== Trafficking ==
The United Nations have defined human trafficking as follows:

The recruitment, transportation, transfer, harbouring or receipt of persons, by means of the threat or use of force or other forms of coercion, of abduction, of fraud, of deception, of the abuse of power or of a position of vulnerability or of the giving or receiving of payments or benefits to achieve the consent of a person having control over another person, for the purpose of exploitation. Exploitation shall include, at a minimum, the exploitation of the prostitution of others or other forms of sexual exploitation, forced labor or services, slavery or practices similar to slavery, servitude or the removal of organs.

According to United States Department of State data, as of 2013, an "estimated 600,000 to 820,000 men, women, and children [are] trafficked across international borders each year, approximately 70 percent are women and girls and up to 50 percent are minors. The data also illustrates that the majority of transnational victims are trafficked into commercial sexual exploitation." However, "the alarming enslavement of people for purposes of labor exploitation, often in their own countries, is a form of human trafficking that can be hard to track from afar". It is estimated that 50,000 people are trafficked every year in the United States.

In recent years, the internet and popular social networking sites have become tools that traffickers use to find vulnerable people who they can then exploit. A 2017 Reuters report discusses how a woman is suing Facebook for negligence as she speculated that executives were aware of a situation that occurred back in 2012 where she was sexually abused and trafficked by someone posing as her "friend". Social media and smartphone apps are also used to sell the slaves.

In 2016, a Washington Post article exposed that the Obama administration placed migrant children with human traffickers. It was shown that they failed to perform adequate background checks of the adults who claimed the children, allowing sponsors to take custody of multiple unrelated children, and regularly placed children in homes without visiting the locations. Several Guatemalan teens were found being held captive by traffickers and forced to work at a local egg farm in Ohio.

== Organizational efforts against slavery ==
=== Government actions ===
In the last two decades, as slavery has become more widely recognized as a formidable global epidemic, multiple governmental organizations have begun taking action to address the problem. The US State Department's annual Trafficking In Persons Report assigns grades to every nation in a tier-system based "not on the size of the country's problem but on the extent of governments' efforts to meet the TVPA's minimum standards for the elimination of human trafficking".

The governments credited with the strongest response to modern slavery are the Netherlands, the United States, the United Kingdom, Sweden, Australia, Portugal, Croatia, Spain, Belgium, Germany and Norway.

In the United Kingdom, the British government passed the Modern Slavery Act 2015, supported by major reforms in the legal system instituted through the Criminal Finances Act 2017, effective from September 30, 2017. Under the latter act, there is transparency in regards to interbank information sharing with law enforcement agencies to help to crack down on money laundering agencies related to contemporary slavery. The Act also aims at reducing the incidence of tax evasion attributed to the modern slave trade conducted under the domain of the law. Despite this, the government has been refusing asylum and deporting children trafficked to the UK as slaves. Several British charities have claimed this puts the deportees at risk of being subject to control by slavery gangs a second time, and deters child victims from coming forward with information.

The British government has taken specific steps to ensure that modern slavery risks are identified and managed in government supply chains. The government also initiated a nationwide campaign against modern slavery: the "Modern slavery is closer than you think" campaign.

In contrast, the governments accused of taking the least action against it are North Korea, China, Eritrea, Equatorial Guinea, Hong Kong, Central African Republic, Papua New Guinea, Guinea, the Democratic Republic of the Congo and South Sudan.

The Supreme Court of the United Kingdom stripped diplomats with a history of domestic worker abuse from claiming diplomatic immunity, saving them from compensatory claims. The July 2022 ruling concerned the case of a London-based Saudi diplomat, Khalid Basfar, who allegedly treated a Filipino staff member hired by him, to slavery, forcing her to wear a bell throughout the day to be available at for his "family's beck and call". The employee, Josephine Wong, was first hired by the Basfar household in November 2015 in Saudi Arabia and brought to the UK to work for him in August 2016. According to court's hearing, Wong was confined to the house except to take the rubbish out. She was allegedly subjected to incessant shouting, offensive names and given leftover food only. The court was requested to judge the issue and determine whether Basfar's treatment of Wong was protected by diplomatic immunity or not, if the case did amount to modern slavery. The concluded that Ms Wong's was a case of modern slavery.

There have been a lot of changes in rewards to law and efforts to mitigate the issue of modern slavery. One of the most recent changes was made by the European Union. In July 2024, the European Union's Corporate Sustainability Due Diligence Directive (CSDDD) took effect. This measure obligate companies to shift away from voluntary reporting to identifying and actually addressing any potential violation and abuse to human rights within the global chain of a company. This measure will be enforced by an authority designated by member states, who will be in charge of supervising the conduct of the companies and set penalties accordingly.

=== Private initiatives ===
In September 2013, the three anti-slavery donors, the Legatum Foundation, Humanity United and the Walk Free Foundation founded the Freedom Fund. As of December 2019, the Freedom Fund is reported to have impacted 686,468 lives, liberated 27,397 people from modern slavery and helped 56,181 previously out-of-school children to receive either formal or non-formal education, in Nepal, Ethiopia, India and Thailand. Meanwhile, in October 2014, the Freedom Fund, Polaris and the Walk Free Foundation launched the Global Modern Slavery Directory, which was the first publicly searchable database of over 770 organisations working to end forced labor and human trafficking. BT also teamed up with anti-modern slavery campaigners free the unseen.

== Statistics ==
Modern slavery is a multibillion-dollar industry with just the forced labor aspect generating US$150 billion each year. The Global Slavery Index (2018) estimated that roughly 40.3 million individuals are currently caught in modern slavery, with 71% of those being female, and 1 in 4 being children. As of 2018, the countries with the most slaves were: India (8 million), China (3.86 million), Pakistan (3.19 million), North Korea (2.64 million), Nigeria (1.39 million), Indonesia (1.22 million), Democratic Republic of the Congo (1 million), Russia (794,000) and the Philippines (784,000).

Various jurisdictions now require large commercial organizations to publish a slavery and human trafficking statement in regard to their supply chains each financial year (e.g. California, UK, Australia). The Walk Free Foundation reported in 2018 that 40.3 million people worldwide live in conditions that can be described as slavery. According to the foundation, more than 400,000 of those are in the United States. Andrew Forrest, founder of the organisation, was quoted as saying that "the United States is one of the most advanced countries in the world yet has more than 400,000 modern slaves working under forced labor conditions". In March 2020, released British police records showed that the number of modern slavery offences recorded has increased by more than 50%, from 3,412 cases in 2018 to 5,144 cases in 2019. This coincided with a 68% increase in calls and submissions to the modern slavery helpline over the same time period.

There is an estimate of 10,000 potential victims of modern slavery in the UK.

== Impact of the COVID-19 pandemic on modern slavery ==
Since the COVID-19 pandemic, there has been an impact on the global supply chains including factories in Malaysia providing PPE to the NHS in the UK, and an influx of online clothing shopping, which has led factories in third world countries to rapidly expand to deal with the influx of demand. A result, this rapid increase in demand for clothes and PPE has led to some companies using the pandemic as an excuse to exploit vulnerable workers, even forcing them to work through the pandemic, putting them at risk of contracting the disease. The pandemic has led to multiple impacts across the globe.

=== Creation of new risks and abuses for victims ===
Self-isolation and social isolation is a major aspect of the pandemic, and it may increase the chances for young people being vulnerable to grooming and abuse due to a lack of contact with friends and family. Ordinarily some Quranic schools in West Africa practice forced begging. Since many of the pupils began to reside within the school premises due to the pandemic, they are subject to further abuse/punishment as a result of them not bringing in as much income.

Wealthy families in Mauritania have exploited the pandemic as well, by firing Haratine domestic workers, or allowing them to work on the condition that they are confined within the workplace to avoid travel. This entraps the Haratine people, since if they do not take the work they starve, but if they continue to work they leave their families without resources.

=== Increased susceptibility to slavery ===
The use of lockdowns has been implemented to attempt to stop the spread of the virus. This has led to mass firings as a result of global brands cancelling orders resulting in factories shutting down. By March 2020 over 1 million workers in Bangladesh were fired or suspended. Workers in Cambodia, India, Myanmar and Vietnam have experienced similar problems. A lack of government support for citizens has led to an increase of human trafficking as a result of people turning to bonded labor for survival.

=== Increase in risk for migrant workers ===
Victims of modern-day slavery are often hesitant to go to the authorities for help due to a fear of being criminalized, detained or deported rather than being treated as victims of a crime. Victims of modern-day slavery often live in cramped conditions in which the Covid virus can spread quickly. This, along with the combination of being fearful to get help from the authorities such as the NHS, leads to victims catching diseases and potentially dying as a result.

=== Disruption to anti-slavery campaigns ===
During the COVID-19 pandemic, many countries adopted lockdowns, which hindered the operations of anti-slavery organisations as people were not allowed to meet up during the lockdown. Anti-slavery support services and educational centres were also shut down as a result of the lockdown.

=== Impact of the pandemic on modern slavery in the UK ===
The Home Office has stated the number of suspected modern slavery victims in the UK has fallen for the first time in 4 years, as a result of the pandemic. Officials say this is due to the restrictions implemented in the UK and an increase of self-isolation and businesses shutting.

The national referral mechanism has recorded 2,871 referrals of potential modern day slavery victims in the 1st quarter of 2020, which is a 14% fall from the previous 3 months. There has been an increase of child victims "partially driven" by an increase of county lines.

== Impact of social media on modern slavery ==
The appearance of social media and new digital technology has exponentially changed the growth of modern slavery, working as a tool that facilitates the exploitation of vulnerable populations facilitating its growth as it enables perpetrators to control and reach a wider audience.

As the NGO Walk Free claims, perpetrators are now able to more easily reach a higher cipher of victims in different locations, access all their information, and identify their vulnerabilities without even revealing their identity. Not only that, but because technology is constantly changing, laws and measures cannot manage stay up to date, resulting in a lack of accountability that allows modern slavery to keep growing on the internet.

=== Media ===
- The documentary film 13th explores the "intersection of race, justice, and mass incarceration in the United States;" It is titled after the Thirteenth Amendment to the United States Constitution, adopted in 1865, which abolished slavery throughout the United States and ended involuntary servitude. But slavery has been silently perpetuated since that time until the present, through criminalizing behavior, and enabling police to arrest poor freedmen, forcing them to work for the states plus the prevalence of massive "carceral states" managed by for profit prison corporations that have created the current carceral capitalism in the United States.
- The documentary film A Woman Captured follows the life of a 52-year-old woman in Hungary who is kept as a modern-day slave.
- There have been a number of documentaries that highlight worker abuse and other human rights issues in Arab states of the Persian Gulf, for example Qatar. There were also calls to boycott the 2022 FIFA World cup in Qatar.

== See also ==
- History of slavery
- Wage slavery
- Labor trafficking in the United States
- County lines drug trafficking
- Modern Slavery Act 2015 (UK)
- Slavery in antiquity
- Slavery in the post-Gaddafi era
- Slavery in the United States § Reconstruction to the present
- Unfree labour
- 2023 Grape Harvest of Shame
