= WXJX =

WXJX may refer to:

- WJFA, a radio station (910 AM) licensed to serve Apollo, Pennsylvania, United States, which held the call sign WXJX from 2018 to 2024
- WWSO-LP, a low-power radio station (99.7 FM) licensed to serve Hillsville, Virginia, United States, which held the call sign WXJX-LP from 2015 to 2017
- WNJR (FM), a radio station (91.7 FM) licensed to serve Washington, Pennsylvania, which held the call sign WXJX from 1989 to 2002
