= KVST =

KVST may refer to:

- KVST (FM), a radio station (99.7 FM) licensed to serve Huntsville, Texas, United States
- KVST-TV, a defunct television station in Los Angeles, California, United States on UHF channel 68.
