= XHLAC =

XHLAC can refer to two stations, both in Lázaro Cárdenas, Michoacán:

- XHLAC-FM 107.9, "Radio Azul"
- XHLAC-TV channel 11, transmitter for the Canal 5 network
