= XHOL-FM =

Radio station in Chignautla–Teziutlán, Puebla

Chignautla, Puebla; Mexico
- Frequency: 99.7 FM
- Branding: Impacto FM

Programming
- Format: Pop

Ownership
- Owner: Radio Impacto, S.A.

History
- First air date: July 30, 1964 (concession)

Technical information
- ERP: 6 kW
- Transmitter coordinates: 19°48′35″N 97°23′04″W

Links
- Website: impactofm.com.mx

XHOL-FM is a radio station on 99.7 FM in Chignautla, Puebla and serving Teziutlán, known as Impacto FM.

== History ==
Final logo as Radio Impacto

XEOL-AM 990 received its concession on July 30, 1964. The 500-watt station was owned by Margarita Castellanos Cortés. It was sold to Radio Impacto in 1972. In the 1990s, XEOL moved to 910 kHz and increased its power from 1,000 to 10,000 watts during the day.

XEOL was cleared to move to FM in 2011 and shuttered its AM facility in 2017.
