= WMYU-LP =

- Ooltewah, Tennessee; United States
- Frequency: 99.7 MHz
- Branding: My 100

Programming
- Format: Contemporary Inspirational
- Affiliations: USA Radio Network

Ownership
- Owner: The Freedom Fund

Technical information
- Licensing authority: FCC
- Facility ID: 133726
- Class: L1
- ERP: 100 watts
- HAAT: 29.5 meters (97 ft)
- Transmitter coordinates: 35°3′47.00″N 85°2′15.00″W

Links
- Public license information: LMS

WMYU-LP (99.7 FM, "My 100") is a radio station broadcasting a Contemporary Inspirational music format. Licensed to Ooltewah, Tennessee, United States, the station is currently owned by The Freedom Fund and features programming from USA Radio Network.
