= XHETR-FM =

Radio station in Ciudad Valles, San Luis Potosí, Mexico

- Ciudad Valles, San Luis Potosí; Mexico
- Frequency: 99.7 FM
- Branding: Voz 99.7

Programming
- Format: Full-service

Ownership
- Owner: Publicidad Popular Potosina, S.A.

History
- First air date: June 25, 1944 (concession)

Technical information
- Licensing authority: CRT
- Class: B1
- ERP: 25 kW
- HAAT: −31.2 m (−102 ft)
- Transmitter coordinates: 21°57′40″N 98°59′49″W

Links
- Website: voz997.com

XHETR-FM is a radio station on 99.7 FM in Ciudad Valles, San Luis Potosí, Mexico, known as Voz 99.7.

== History ==
XETR-AM 1490 received its concession on June 25, 1944 and began operations as "La Voz de la Huasteca". It was owned by Tomás Oliva Bañuelos and broadcast with 125 watts. Later, it moved to 1120 with 1,000 watts. It was sold to Publicidad Popular Potosina in 1961 and remained a 1 kW daytimer for most of its history. It used the Radio Ritmo name in the 1960s and became known Radio Panorámica name in the 1970s.

In 2011, XETR was approved for AM-FM migration as XHETR-FM 99.7. The Radio Panorámica name was dropped in 2022 when the station was renamed Voz 99.7.
