= 2023 Grape Harvest of Shame =

Labor exploitation case in France

The 2023 Grape Harvest of Shame is a labor exploitation case that took place during the 2023 champagne grape harvest in the Champagne region, France. Fifty-seven, mostly undocumented, West African workers were tricked into the job with false promises, brought to the Champagne region where they were mistreated, lived in overcrowded and dirty conditions with little food and water, and forced to work. The trial is being held at the criminal court of Châlons-en-Champagne.

== Name origin ==
The phrase "Harvest of Shame" originates from a 1960 documentary of the same name, by Edward R. Murrow that aired on CBS, revealing the poor working condition of migrant farm workers in the United States. The name of the case is based on this phrase.

== Background ==
In September 2023, the French police received complaints from the neighbouring village of Nesle-le-Repons about noise and activity in a derelict house. The police found 57 undocumented workers at the site, most of them from Mali, Mauritania, Ivory Coast, and Senegal, but all held in inhumane conditions likened to slavery. The living spaces were overcrowded, with unsafe electrical wiring, blocked and unusable toilets, a lack of proper sanitation and potable water, and inadequate, spoiled food provisions.

== Case details ==
The case began in June 2025, and was described as "one of the biggest labour scandals to hit France’s exclusive sparkling wine industry", three individuals and two companies face charges of human trafficking and employing foreign nationals without permits, and housing workers in conditions that prosecutors say harmed their "security, health and dignity". The accused include a Kyrgyzstanian woman and two fellow workers from the labor supply firm Anavim, as well as a French man and a Georgian man.

== See also ==
- Human trafficking
- Human rights
- Slavery in the 21st century
