= Universidad Autónoma del Estado de Hidalgo =

Autonomous University of the State of Hidalgo
- Universidad Autónoma del Estado de Hidalgo
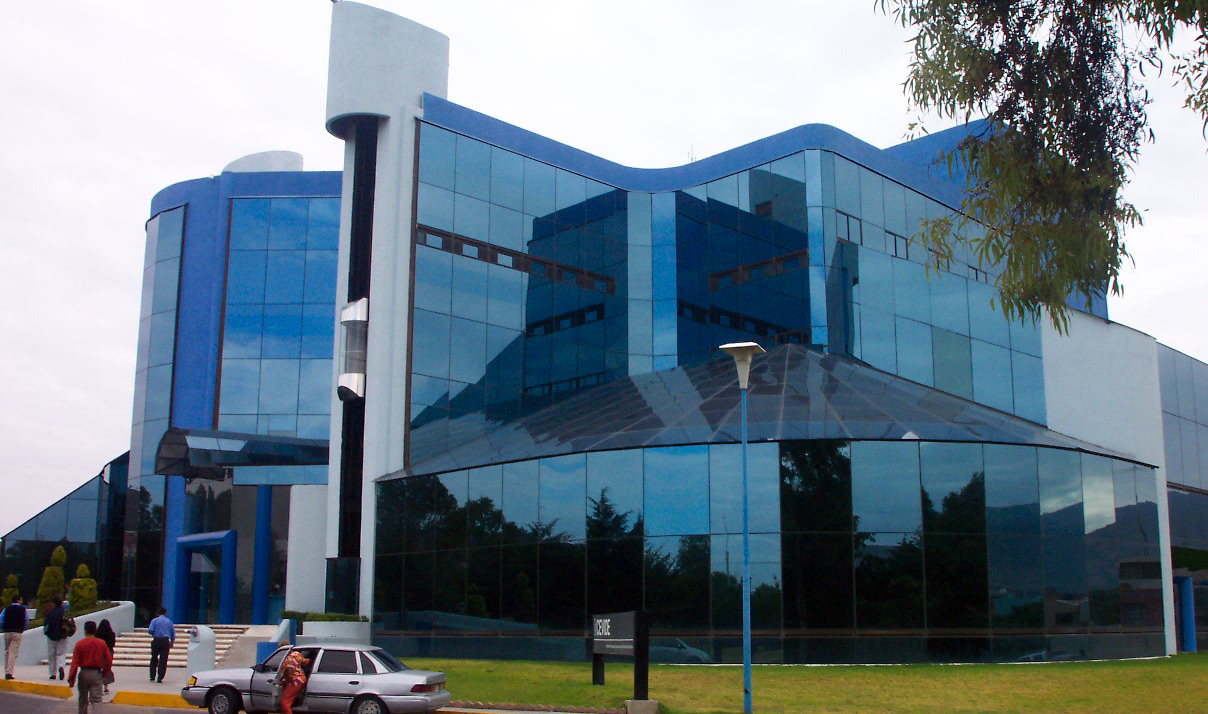
- CIVE building at UAEH
- Former names: Instituto Literario y Escuela de Artes y Oficios
- Motto: "Amor, Orden y Progreso"
- Motto in English: "Love, Order & Progress" (A.Comte)
- Type: Public university
- Established: 1869
- Endowment: 132 million USD
- Rector: Adolfo Pontigo Loyola
- Academic staff: 3,164
- Students: 33,648
- Undergraduates: 22,072
- Location: Pachuca, Hidalgo, Mexico; 20°07′41″N 98°44′04″W
- Colors: Silver, Navy Blue
- Nickname: Silver Herons
- Website: www.uaeh.edu.mx

The Autonomous University of the State of Hidalgo (Universidad Autónoma del Estado de Hidalgo or UAEH) is a public university located in Pachuca, the capital of the State of Hidalgo in east-central Mexico, with campuses statewide. The university was initially founded in 1869. It is the oldest, largest, and most respected research university in the state and a member of the Consortium of Mexican Universities (CUMEX).

== History ==
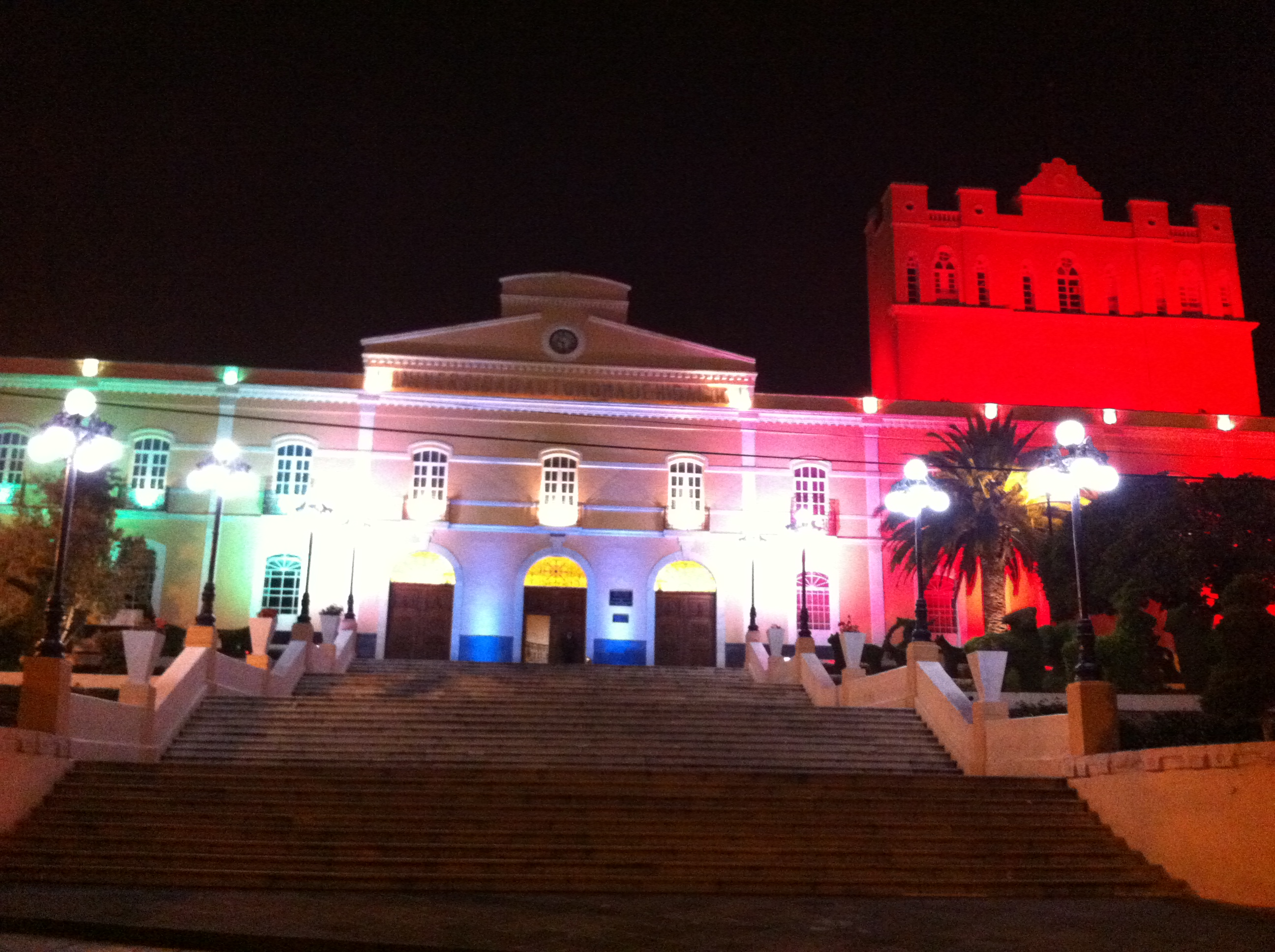
Historic central building.

The UAEH was the first university established in the state of Hidalgo, tracing its origins to the Instituto Literario y Escuela de Artes y Oficios (Literary Institute and School of Arts and Crafts), founded in Pachuca in February 1869 by various businessmen and promptly absorbed by the state government under Governor Juan C. Doria. In 1875, the new school moved from a rented house to the former San Juan de Dios Hospital, which had been founded in 1725; this structure is now the Central Building of the university.

During the Mexican Revolution, the university was almost closed on several occasions, but it survived. In 1921, it absorbed other schools and became known as the Universidad de Hidalgo (University of Hidalgo), but it returned to its original name four years later. In the 1940s, the school added programs in medicine, law and engineering, and it acquired autonomy in 1948.

As part of a push to develop new universities in Mexico and in response to an increasing need for higher education, on February 24, 1961, the 53rd Legislature of Hidalgo promulgated a decree creating the current Universidad Autónoma del Estado de Hidalgo.

The UAEH helped to found the Consortium of Mexican Universities (CUMEX) in 2005; its former rector, Luis Gil Borja, was the president of CUMEX from 2008 to 2010.

== Students ==
The institution draws students from all 84 municipalities of the state, and from the central region of Mexico. The student population is approximately 40,000 students, mainly composed of students from the state capital and in-state territories, out-state students and a minority of international students.

== Campuses ==
In addition to its main campuses in Pachuca, the UAEH has a presence across the state of Hidalgo, with facilities in Actopan, Apan, Atotonilco de Tula, Ciudad Sahagún, Huejutla de Reyes, Mineral del Monte, Tepejí del Río, Tizayuca, Tlahuelilpan, Tulancingo and Zimapán, as well as four high schools both in the Pachuca and Tulancingo areas.

== See also ==
- F. C. Universidad Autónoma del Estado de Hidalgo
- XHUAH-FM, the university's radio station and part of a network of 4 transmitters in Hidalgo
