= XHPLVI-FM =

Radio station in Calvillo, Aguascalientes, Mexico

- Calvillo, Aguascalientes; Mexico
- Frequency: 99.7 FM
- Branding: Radio Ranchito

Programming
- Format: Regional Mexican

Ownership
- Owner: Grupo Ultra; (Arturo Emilio Zorrilla Ibarra)

History
- First air date: May 2018
- Call sign meaning: CaLVIllo

Technical information
- Licensing authority: CRT
- Class: A
- ERP: 3 kW
- HAAT: −145.2 m (−476 ft)
- Transmitter coordinates: 21°52′21.7″N 102°41′44″W

Links
- Website: www.radioranchito.com.mx/calvillo/

XHPLVI-FM is a radio station on 99.7 FM in Calvillo, Aguascalientes. It is owned by Grupo Ultra and carries its Radio Ranchito Regional Mexican format.

== History ==
XHPLVI was awarded in the IFT-4 radio auction of 2017 and officially came to air in May 2018.
