= 99.7 Bridge FM =

Radio station in Redcliffe, Australia

99.7 Bridge FM (4RED)
- Redcliffe, Queensland; Australia
- Broadcast area: Northern Brisbane and Moreton Bay; Redcliffe RA1 ()
- Frequency: 99.7 MHz

Programming
- Language: English
- Format: Classic rock/album-oriented rock

Ownership
- Owner: Moreton Media Group Inc.

History
- First air date: 21 February 1992

Technical information
- Licensing authority: Australian Communications and Media Authority
- ERP: 1,000 watts
- HAAT: 40 m
- Transmitter coordinates: 27°14′42″S 153°6′2″E

Links
- Public licence information: Profile
- Website: Official website

99.7 Bridge FM (callsign 4RED) is a radio station serving Brisbane's Greater North and the City of Moreton Bay. 99 Seven broadcast from purpose-built studios in Anzac Avenue in the Suburb of Redcliffe to Brisbane's greater North and Moreton Bay. The transmitter site is located at the Water Tower in the suburb of Margate, Queensland. 99 Seven was the first radio station with a community broadcasting licence in Australia to have a full digital air chain. This occurred in 2006/2007 when the station installed Klotz Broadcasting equipment and Omnia processing. Currently 99 Seven broadcast using Rode microphones, Klotz Aeon and Xenon consoles, Simian automation and when required Denon DNC635 CD players. Main audio processing is with Omnia equipment and back up processing is with CRL FM Amigo. Online streaming uses Omnia processing.

== See also ==
- List of radio stations in Australia
