= WBVL-LP =

Radio station in Kissimmee, Florida

- Kissimmee, Florida; United States
- Frequency: 99.7 MHz
- Branding: Radio Alpha

Programming
- Format: Christian music

Ownership
- Owner: Sucremedia, Inc.

Technical information
- Licensing authority: FCC
- Facility ID: 133444
- Class: L1
- ERP: 100 watts
- HAAT: 24.8 meters
- Transmitter coordinates: 28°14′42.00″N 81°18′12.00″W

Links
- Public license information: LMS
- Website: www.somosalpha.net

WBVL-LP (99.7 FM) is a radio station licensed to Kissimmee, Florida, United States. The station is currently owned by Sucremedia, Inc.
