= WSHW =

Coordinates: 40.421°N 86.413°W

- Frankfort, Indiana; United States
- Broadcast area: Frankfort-Kokomo-Lafayette
- Frequency: 99.7 MHz
- Branding: Shine FM

Programming
- Format: Christian adult contemporary

Ownership
- Owner: Olivet Nazarene University

History
- First air date: 1962 (as WILO-FM)
- Former call signs: WILO-FM (1962–1982)
- Call sign meaning: From "Shine" format

Technical information
- Facility ID: 33466
- Class: B
- ERP: 50,000 watts
- HAAT: 140 meters (460 ft)

Links
- Webcast: Listen Live
- Website: shine.fm

WSHW (99.7 FM "Shine FM") is a radio station owned by Olivet Nazarene University in Frankfort, Indiana. The station has an office and studio in Kokomo and Frankfort. Shine FM serves a 14 county area from its tower and transmitter located near the Howard, Clinton, Carroll County line. WSHW Shine 99 1mv/meter coverage area includes all or parts of 14 counties in North-Central Indiana including Howard, Tippecanoe, Clinton, Cass, Boone, Carroll, Tipton, White, Miami, Hamilton, Montgomery, Wabash, Grant, Madison.

During the summer of 2015, the station flipped its music format to Contemporary Hit Radio (CHR) after spending several years evolving from its original adult contemporary music (AC) sound to a brighter, more contemporary music mix. It has operated under the "Shine 99" moniker and WSHW call letters since April 9, 1982.

WSHW was the first station in Indiana and second FM radio station in the United States to broadcast in HD 24/7 during HD's development phase. Shine 99 was one of the first radio stations in Indiana to have a web presence on the internet with a Shine Radio web site created during the summer of 1995. Sister station WILO was the first AM station in the U.S. to broadcast an HD signal 24/7. WSHW also worked with Delphi Delco during the development phase of RDS (Radio Data System) which is now commonplace on most radio dash systems.

WSHW played a key role as an experimental station in the early development of RDS, bringing text to the car dashboard.

Logo as "Shine" used prior to Olivet Nazarene University sale

On March 7, 2023, Kaspar Broadcasting announced it would sell Shine 99 to Olivet Nazarene University for $1,452,000 (to be paid in portions- a $245,000 payment upon the sale closure, the rest in a promissory note); with the move, Kaspar announced the CHR format would sign off on April 28 at 10AM. At that time, after a special goodbye show led by morning hosts Scott Alan and Cindy Loveless (which concluded with "Wish You Were Here" by Pink Floyd), the station began stunting with a broad mix of pop music, country music, and Contemporary Christian music before ONU would take over control and flip the station to its own similarly named "Shine FM" contemporary Christian format on May 1.
