= XHUAX-FM =

Radio station of the Universidad Autónoma del Estado de México in Toluca

Toluca, Estado de México; Mexico
- Frequency: 99.7 MHz
- Branding: Uni Radio 99.7 FM

Programming
- Format: University radio

Ownership
- Owner: Universidad Autónoma del Estado de México

History
- First air date: February 21, 2007
- Call sign meaning: Universidad Autónoma del Estado de MeXico

Technical information
- ERP: 2.67 kW

Links
- Website: www.uaemex.mx/uniradio/

XHUAX-FM is a radio station serving Toluca in the State of Mexico. It is the radio station of the Universidad Autónoma del Estado de México and broadcasts on 99.7 FM from its campus, with a transmitter on the Radio y Televisión Mexiquense tower in Metepec.

== History ==
XHUAX received its permit in February 2006 as part of the last round of permits awarded by the Secretariat of Communications and Transportation. The university, however, stalled in its efforts to plan for the station. With just months left to get the station on air, the project transferred from the cultural outreach department to university communications. Tests began in November, and XHUAX signed on February 21, 2007.
