= KHGV-LP =

Houston, Texas; United States
- Frequency: 99.7 MHz
- Branding: Garden Villas Radio

Programming
- Format: (defunct)

Ownership
- Owner: Garden Villas Community Association, Inc.

History
- First air date: 2015
- Last air date: July 2024

Technical information
- Licensing authority: FCC
- Facility ID: 195834
- Class: L1
- ERP: 100 watts
- HAAT: 12 metres (39 ft)
- Transmitter coordinates: 29°39′7.60″N 95°18′28.40″W

Links
- Public license information: LMS

KHGV-LP (99.7 FM) was a non-profit radio station licensed to serve the community of Houston, Texas. The station was owned by Garden Villas Community Association, Inc. It aired an oldies radio format.

The station was assigned the KHGV-LP call letters by the Federal Communications Commission on February 5, 2015.

KHGV-LP went off the air on January 21, 2024, citing "a perfect storm" of staffing, technical and financial problems. After a brief return to the air in June, the station went off the air again in July and the license was officially deleted on August 5.
