= XHLAC-FM =

IMER radio station in Lázaro Cárdenas, Michoacán

- Lázaro Cárdenas, Michoacán; Mexico
- Frequency: 99.7 MHz (HD Radio)
- Branding: Radio Azul

Programming
- Format: News/talk and Spanish adult hits

Ownership
- Owner: Instituto Mexicano de la Radio

History
- First air date: March 1, 1977
- Former frequencies: 1560 AM, 107.9 FM

Technical information
- ERP: 25 kW
- HAAT: -28.08 meters
- Transmitter coordinates: 18°01′30.8″N 102°11′40.6″W

Links
- Webcast: XHLAC-FM
- Website: http://www.imer.mx/radioazul/

XHLAC-FM is a radio station in Lázaro Cárdenas, Michoacán. Broadcasting on 99.7 FM, XHLAC-FM is owned by the Instituto Mexicano de la Radio and broadcasts a Spanish-language adult hits and news/talk format under the name of Radio Azul.

== History ==
XELAC-AM 1560 signed on March 1, 1977 under the management of Sicartsa, a massive, then-state-owned iron and steel mill which brought many jobs to Lázaro Cárdenas, and with them the need for a radio station. The concession for XELAC, then a 5 kW daytimer was owned by another state enterprise, Promotora Radiofónica del Balsas, S.A de C.V., which had beat out various other commercial bidders for the station (two of whom objected to the award). 1981 saw the station begin broadcasting at night with 150 watts, increasing to 1,000 watts in 1995.

In 1983, Promotora Radiofónica del Balsas was included among the first assets of IMER—its first radio station outside of Mexico City. By 1984, 80% of its program output was music, with the balance in news and sports programming. In August 1986, Promotora Radiofónica del Balsas was formally liquidated.

In 2013, XHLAC-FM 107.9 was officially signed on as part of the AM-FM migration campaign currently underway among other radio stations in Mexico. XHLAC-FM currently broadcasts in HD Radio.

XHLAC-FM was moved to 99.7 MHz at 3pm on February 7, 2019, to clear 106-108 MHz for community and indigenous stations.

=== XHLAC broadcasts in HD Radio ===
- HD2 is a simulcast of XEB-AM.
- HD3 is a simulcast of XEQK-AM.
