= WIWI-LP =

Milwaukee, Wisconsin; United States
- Frequency: 99.7 MHz

Programming
- Format: Community radio; Spanish

Ownership
- Owner: Milwaukee Hispanic Radio, Inc.

History
- First air date: December 6, 2018

Technical information
- Licensing authority: FCC
- Facility ID: 196922
- Class: L1
- ERP: 80 watts
- HAAT: 47.2 meters (155 ft)

Links
- Public license information: LMS

WIWI-LP (99.7 FM) is a non-commercial low-power FM radio station licensed to Milwaukee, Wisconsin. The station is owned by Milwaukee Hispanic Radio, Inc.
