= KVST (FM) =

Radio station in Huntsville, Texas

- Huntsville, Texas; United States
- Broadcast area: Conroe, Texas
- Frequency: 99.7 MHz
- Branding: K-Star Country

Programming
- Format: Country

Ownership
- Owner: New Wavo Communication Group, Inc.

History
- First air date: January 14, 1999
- Former call signs: KCEY (1990–1998, CP); KUST (1998–2005)
- Call sign meaning: "Star"

Technical information
- Licensing authority: FCC
- Facility ID: 26858
- Class: C3
- ERP: 17,000 watts
- HAAT: 122 meters (400 ft)
- Transmitter coordinates: 30°36′04″N 95°29′03″W

Links
- Public license information: Public file; LMS
- Webcast: Listen live
- Website: kstarcountry.com

KVST is a radio station airing a country music format licensed to Huntsville, Texas, broadcasting on 99.7 FM. The station is owned by New Wavo Communication Group, Inc.

== History ==
The original KVST signed on in Huntsville, Texas at 103.5 as an Adult Contemporary station named "Star 103.5". The format was short-lived and yielded the way for the current K-Star country format. The frequency was changed later to 103.7 and then moved southward to Willis, Texas in hopes of covering the exploding populous around Montgomery County.

The original 99.7 signal in Huntsville came on the air as KUST from a transmit site west of Huntsville and was used as a replacement for the original K-Star at 103.7 (now KHJK) when it was moved to Willis. This facility came to life so as to expand the K-Star format back into Huntsville with a clear signal, which was lost when 103.7 moved to Willis.

103.7 was sold to Cumulus Broadcasting by New Wavo for $32 million in 2005. Once Cumulus assumed control of KVST, the company applied for and received a grant to uproot 103.7 again. This time, it moved to La Porte, upgrading to a full Class C facility, and traded calls with this facility as part of the license transfer, resulting in 103.7 becoming KUST La Porte, while KUST became KVST Huntsville. At the same time, New Wavo applied for and was granted a move of its own. Once receiving FCC approval, 99.7 was physically moved down Interstate Highway 45 by trucks from Huntsville to the former transmit site near Willis used for 103.7, making the very same journey that New Wavo had made with 103.7 years before, and reimaged as "K-Star Country 99.7".

In July 2014, KVST filed an application to move from its tower west of Willis back north to the original 103.5/103.7 tower near Huntsville. This improves the station's signal in Huntsville and Trinity, Texas, while resulting in some loss of coverage in The Woodlands and northern Houston.

== On-Air Staff ==
The Funny Farm with Lisa Christi airs weekday mornings 6a-10. Lisa has been hosting this show since 2006. Long time co-host "Brave Dave" retired from radio in March 2022.

Texas radio hall of famers Larry Galla and Mary McCoy have been doing their classic show since 1998. As of February 2022, Mary McCoy was named the longest running female DJ by the Guinness Book of World Records.

Brad Witt weekdays 1-3pm

Dave Horton weekdays 3-7pm
