= WWSO-LP =

- Hillsville, Virginia; United States
- Broadcast area: Metro Hillsville
- Frequency: 99.7 MHz

Programming
- Language: English
- Format: Children's radio

Ownership
- Owner: Hillsville Radio for Kids

History
- First air date: July 27, 2015
- Former call signs: WSJF-LP (2014); WWSO-LP (2014–2015); WXJX-LP (2015–2017)

Technical information
- Licensing authority: FCC
- Facility ID: 196545
- Class: L1
- ERP: 30 watts
- HAAT: 54 meters (177 ft)
- Transmitter coordinates: 36°44′44.70″N 80°44′22.20″W

Links
- Public license information: LMS

WWSO-LP is a children's radio-formatted broadcast radio station licensed to and serving Hillsville, Virginia. WWSO-LP is owned and operated by Hillsville Radio for Kids.
