= Walk Free =

International human rights organisation based in Australia

- Formation: 2010; 16 years ago
- Founders: Grace Forrest; Andrew Forrest
- Founded at: Perth, Western Australia
- Type: Nonprofit
- Purpose: Human rights (Slavery)
- Headquarters: Perth, Western Australia
- Product: Global Slavery Index
- Website: www.walkfree.org

Walk Free is an international human rights group based in Perth, Western Australia. Its goal is the end of modern slavery.

The initiative was founded by Grace Forrest in 2011. Walk Free is best known for the publication of the Global Slavery Index, now in its fifth edition (published in 2023).

In 2013, Walk Free became a co-founder of the Freedom Fund, an anti-slavery non-profit organisation. The Freedom Fund works to tackle the many forms of modern slavery in regions where it is most highly concentrated.

== Background ==
Sustainable Development Goal (SDG) 8.7, part of a framework adopted by the United Nations in 2015, seeks to end modern slavery by appealing to the international community. Walk Free's approach to achieving SDG 8.7 involves building a knowledge base to inform action and driving legislative change in countries in partnership with faiths, businesses, academics, NGOs, and governments. Through these partnerships, direct implementation, and grassroots community engagement, Walk Free believes that modern slavery can be eradicated.

== Global estimates of modern slavery ==
In 2017, the inaugural Global Estimates of Modern Slavery were produced by the International Labour Organization and Walk Free in partnership with the International Organization for Migration. The analysis drew on data from nationally representative surveys implemented through the Gallup World Poll including a module on modern slavery in 48 countries, and data from the Global Slavery Index Vulnerability Model.

Acknowledged data gaps in earlier editions of the Global Slavery Index, including lack of data on forced sexual exploitation and children in modern slavery, were addressed by adopting a combined methodological approach when developing the Global Estimates of Modern Slavery. This involved drawing on three sources of data:

1. The existing Global Slavery Index survey program was expanded to include 54 surveys covering 48 countries. More than 71,000 people have been interviewed and the countries surveyed represent over half of the world's population. It is the most extensive survey program on modern slavery ever undertaken and forms the central component of the Global Estimates of Modern Slavery.
2. Administrative data from the International Organization for Migration's databases of assisted victims of trafficking, and
3. Data derived from validated secondary sources and a systematic review of comments from the International Labour Organization supervisory bodies regarding ILO Conventions on forced labour.

== Global Slavery Index ==
The Global Slavery Index presents a ranking of 181 countries based on the percentage of the population estimated to be in modern slavery.

In 2013, Walk Free released the first edition of the Global Slavery Index. Later editions were released in 2014, 2016, 2018 and 2023. The 2018 Global Slavery Index Vulnerability Model provided a risk score for 167 countries, while the Government Response Index provided an assessment on 181 governments.

The index provides rankings across three dimensions:

- Size of the problem: What is the estimated prevalence of modern slavery country by country in terms of percentage of population and absolute figures
- Government response: How are governments tackling modern slavery
- Vulnerability: What factors explain or predict the prevalence of modern slavery

The methodology of early editions of the Global Slavery Index has been criticized by researchers Andrew Guth, Robyn Anderson, Kasey Kinnard, and Hang Tran. According to their analysis of the 2014 edition, the Index's methods had significant and critical weaknesses which raised questions about its replicability and validity.

The Walk Free Foundation has stated that it "welcomes constructive criticism", and subsequent editions of the Global Slavery Index, published in 2016, 2018 and 2023, have undergone significant changes to the methodology to determine prevalence estimates.

The Walk Free Foundation has started research on a 2026 edition, to be published in early to mid 2027. The 2026 edition will feature 181 countries in total.

== See also ==
- Slavery
- Contemporary slavery
