= Freedom Fund =

International anti-slavery organisation

- Formation: 26 September 2013
- Founders: Humanity United; Legatum; Walk Free Foundation
- Type: United States 501(c)(3) public charity
- Registration no.: United States 30-0805768, United Kingdom 1158838
- Headquarters: Lighterman House; 26-36 Wharfdale Road; London, N19RY, UK
- Staff: 12
- Website: freedomfund.org

The Freedom Fund is an international non-profit organisation dedicated to identifying and investing in the most effective frontline efforts to end slavery. In 2017, the International Labour Organization reported that on any given day in 2016, there were 40 million people living in modern slavery worldwide across a wide range of industries.

The Freedom Fund was founded in September 2013, by three leading anti-slavery donors, Humanity United, the Legatum Foundation and the Walk Free Foundation and officially announced by President Bill Clinton at the Clinton Global Initiative on September 26, 2013, where he declared "this is a huge deal and we should all support this."

== Mission and values ==
The Freedom Fund has set a target of raising US$100million by 2020 and investing it to bring about much needed strategic focus to the fight against modern slavery. To achieve this, The Freedom Fund has focused its activities on three main areas:

Hotspot projects – The Freedom Fund partners with frontline organisations to directly combat slavery in defined regions with a high concentration of slavery. They do this by setting up "hotspot" projects - clusters of the most effective community-based organisations in these regions. Partnering with these organisations in some of the world's poorest and most marginalised communities is difficult, demanding and time intensive, but it is also one of the most effective ways to achieve large scale and sustainable change. The Freedom Fund's northern India hotspot has been in place since 2014, and as of December 2017, had liberated over 11,000 people from modern slavery. The Freedom Fund's hotspots are located in central Nepal, Ethiopia, northern India, south-eastern Nepal, southern India and Thailand.
Global initiatives - The Freedom Fund tackles underlying systems that allow slavery to persist. They do this in their hotspots, engaging the government, private sector, media, social movements, and other key drivers of change. They also do it by catalysing action on selected global issues and industries that have a direct link to their hotspots. This allows the Freedom Fund to tackle systemic issues like slavery in fishing, migration, or to help develop new technological tools or legal initiatives. In March 2015, the Freedom Fund and C&A Foundation announced a partnership to tackle forced labour in the textile industry.
Movement building initiatives - The Freedom Fund helps to build and empower a global anti-slavery movement, providing the platforms, tools and knowledge for organisations to connect and work together more effectively.

== Leadership ==
The Freedom Fund's inaugural CEO, Nick Grono, has written articles on modern slavery for the Huffington Post, Newsweek, The Guardian, as well as the Freedom Fund blog. Grono previously served as Deputy President and COO of the Brussels-based International Crisis Group and as CEO of the Walk Free Foundation, an international anti-slavery organisation. During his tenure, the Walk Free Foundation built a global anti-slavery movement with over five million supporters and launched the first ever Global Slavery Index. Grono joined Freedom Fund in December 2013.

== Impact ==
Freedom Fund operates as a meta-charity which disburses grants to local partners who directly implement anti-slavery initiatives. Freedom Fund requires funding recipients to evaluate their performance using a common set of metrics, answering questions including "How many people are being reached directly?" and "[What's the] cost per person to each project?".

As of June 2020 the Freedom Fund reported to have:

- Impacted 765,628 lives
- Liberated 28,040 people from modern slavery
- Helped 57,419 previously out-of-school children to receive formal or non-formal education

COVID-19 emergency fund: In response to the 2019–2020 coronavirus pandemic, The Freedom Fund set up a COVID-19 emergency fund which offered immediate, small scale support to frontline responders in disadvantaged communities in Brazil, Ethiopia, India, Myanmar, Nepal, and Thailand. Monetary assistance was used for food, shelter, protective equipment for medical professionals, sanitation, and other immediate virus-related needs.

== Reports ==
- March 2015: Putting justice first
- October 2015: Addressing mental health needs in survivors of modern slavery: A critical review and research agenda
- December 2015: Ending impunity, securing justice: Using strategic litigation to combat modern-day slavery and human trafficking
- December 2015: Fighting modern slavery: Why role for international criminal justice
- December 2015: Unshackling development: Why we need a global partnership to end modern slavery
- January 2016: Modern slavery and corruption
- February 2016: Safer labour migration and community-based prevention of exploitation: The state of the evidence for programming
- April 2016: Funding the fight against modern slavery
- April 2016: Struggling to survive: Slavery and exploitation of Syrian refugees in Lebanon
- May 2016: Assessing government and business responses to the Thai seafood crisis
- October 2016: Fighting impunity, securing justice: Investing in strategic litigation to combat modern slavery
- November 2016: Modern slavery and trafficking in conflict: The UN's response
- January 2018: Her freedom, her voice: Insights from the Freedom Fund's work with women and girls
- December 2018: Leaning in: Advancing the role of finance against modern slavery
- January 2019: The longer, the riskier: Forced labour along the supply chain
- May 2019: Pathways to justice: How grassroots organisations are harnessing the law to tackle modern slavery
- August 2019: Methodologies for measuring the prevalence of modern slavery
- September 2019: Unlocking what works: How community-based interventions are ending bonded labour in India
- May 2020: Lessons from humanitarian crises
- June 2020: "Our departure" - Responsible recruitment scoping study
- September 2020: Global pandemic, local devastation
- October 2020: Survivors of trafficking need economic security and decent work to sustain liberation
- January 2021: Lessons from the COVID frontlines

== See also ==
- Walk Free Foundation
