= XHNQ-FM (Hidalgo) =

Radio station in Tulancingo, Hidalgo, Mexico

XENQ-AM/XHNQ-FM

Tulancingo, Hidalgo; Mexico
- Frequencies: 640 kHz; 90.1 MHz
- Branding: NQ

Programming
- Format: Full-service radio

Ownership
- Owner: XENQ Radio Tulancingo, S.A. de C.V.

History
- First air date: December 12, 1955

Technical information
- Class: B
- Power: 50 kW day/25 kW night (AM)
- ERP: 50 kW (FM)
- Transmitter coordinates: 20°03′37.4″N 98°28′19.5″W (AM) 20°01′48.0″N 98°33′47.0″W (FM)

Links
- Website: nqradio.com

XENQ-AM/XHNQ-FM is a combo radio station in Tulancingo, Hidalgo. Broadcasting on 640 kHz and 90.1 MHz, XENQ/XHNQ is known as "NQ".

== History ==
XENQ-AM came to air on December 12, 1955, owned by Narciso Solís Huerta and known as "La Voz de Hidalgo". In 1975, the station was acquired by Alejandro Wong.

XHNQ-FM came to air in 1994 as a combo frequency of the AM and increased its power in 2007.

== Programming ==
NQ airs music throughout the day as well as news programming titled "Enlace Hidalgo".
