= XHUAH-FM =

Radio station of the Universidad Autónoma del Estado de Hidalgo

Pachuca; Mexico
- Broadcast area: Pachuca, Hidalgo, Mexico
- Frequency: 99.7 FM
- Branding: Radio UAEH

Programming
- Format: University radio

Ownership
- Owner: Universidad Autónoma del Estado de Hidalgo

History
- First air date: November 20, 2000
- Call sign meaning: Universidad Autónoma del Estado de Hidalgo

Technical information
- ERP: 10,000 watts

Links
- Website: www.uaeh.edu.mx/radio/

XHUAH-FM is a radio station in Pachuca and is the radio station of the Universidad Autónoma del Estado de Hidalgo. It broadcasts on 99.7 MHz from studios on the UAEH campus.

The station began transmissions on September 16, 2000, with older music in English and Spanish, and formally launched on November 20.

In 2010, it increased its power from 3 to 10 kilowatts.

In 2015, the university was authorized to expand XHUAH's coverage with three new repeaters, each broadcasting at 2.81 kW. These stations serve as semi-satellites of Pachuca, including many of their own local programs. The Actopan station was awarded in December 2017. XHPECI-FM 91.1, an HD Radio station serving Tulancingo, signed on October 30, 2020.

- XHBTH-FM 99.7, San Bartolo Tutotepec
- XHHRH-FM 99.7, Huejutla de Reyes
- XHUZH-FM 99.5, Zimapán
- XHPECW-FM 102.1, Actopan
- XHPECI-FM 91.1, Tulancingo
