= Global Slavery Index =

Global study of modern slavery

World map of the 2024 Global Slavery Index, showing estimated prevalence of slavery by country

The Global Slavery Index is a global study of modern slavery published by the Minderoo Foundation's Walk Free initiative.

The index provides rankings across three dimensions: size of the problem (prevalence and absolute number), government response, and vulnerability (factors explaining prevalence).

The index targets private citizens, non-governmental organisations, businesses and public officials so that they can work to end modern slavery. All data involved is available for download from the website.

== Calculation ==
The 2018 Global Slavery Index includes data on three key variables: the prevalence in each country, vulnerability and government responses. In 2018, the methodology underwent changes and significantly expanded its data sources. The methodology is detailed in the report.

In 2017, the inaugural Global Estimates of Modern Slavery were produced by the International Labour Organization (ILO) and the Walk Free Foundation in partnership with the International Organization for Migration. Acknowledged data gaps in earlier editions, including lack of data on forced sexual exploitation and children in modern slavery were addressed by adopting a combined approach when developing the estimates. This involved drawing on three sources of data:

- The survey program was expanded to include 54 surveys covering 48 countries. More than 71,000 people were interviewed and the surveyed countries represent over half of global population. It formed the most extensive survey program on modern slavery ever undertaken.
- Administrative data from the International Organization for Migration's databases of assisted victims of trafficking
- Data derived from validated secondary sources and a systematic review of comments from the International Labour Organization supervisory bodies regarding ILO Conventions on Forced Labor.

The 2018 Global Slavery Index uses the data sources and regional and global estimates from the Global Estimates of Modern Slavery.

The regional estimates form the starting point for the 2018 national level estimates for 167 countries. Prevalence estimates from the 2018 Global Slavery Index were calculated according to the following process:

- Individual and country-level variables that have a significant relationship with forced labour or forced marriage at the individual level were identified. Data for this analysis were taken from Gallup World Poll (GWP) surveys conducted in 2014, 2015 and 2016.
- These risk factors were used to build a statistical model that best predicted occurrence of modern slavery at the individual level.
- Individual predictions were aggregated into risk scores at the country level. Whereas survey data on forced labour and forced marriage are not available for every country, a broader set of survey data covering variables such as age, gender, marital status and so on was available for 147 countries. Country risk scores were used to estimate country prevalence, based on the extent to which the country risk score deviated from the average regional risk scores.
- The number of victims was then estimated by applying the estimated prevalence to population data for each country. To this "base" estimate, an estimate of state-imposed forced labour was added to determine the final estimated prevalence of all forms of modern slavery.

== Criticism ==
The Global Slavery Index was criticized for the methodology it employed to produce prevalence estimates for the 2013, 2014 and 2016 editions. The 2016 prevalence estimates were based on results of surveys in 25 countries through the Gallup World Poll. Results from one country (where survey data was present) were extrapolated to other countries (where data was lacking) with an equivalent risk profile. Measurements of forced sexual exploitation, and of enslaved children, were identified as critical data gaps to address in future estimations. The 2018 Index, however, experienced substantial methodological improvements, including a significant increase in the number of survey data points, and substantial changes to the approach to estimating prevalence in countries without survey data.

Researchers Andrew Guth, Robyn Anderson, Kasey Kinnard and Hang Tran claimed that the 2014 Global Slavery Index's methods reveal weaknesses and raised questions about its replicability and validity. They stated that the use of its data can lead to inaccurate policy formulation and that the methods used in the index are inadequate.

The 2014 Global Slavery Index assigned countries for which no data were available the same rate as surveyed countries that were judged to be similar. For example, prevalence rates for Britain were applied to Ireland and Iceland, and those for America to western European nations, including Germany. This extrapolation attracted criticism.

Scholar Anne Gallagher said the 2014 Global Slavery Index was based on flawed data. Gallagher writes that "the basic unit of measurement of 'modern slavery' is flawed: the definition is self-created and, bizarrely, changes from one year to the next".

Alexis A. Aronowitz called the Index to be "terribly flawed" and pointed out that:

The index is based on mix of sources: population surveys in a few countries; fuzzy estimates by governmental agencies or NGOs; stories in the media; and local experts. For nations lacking any such source, the index creators engage in an "extrapolation" exercise -- they simply apply an estimate from one nation to "similar" nations lacking such estimates.
