= List of radio stations in Tamaulipas =

This is a list of CRT-licensed radio stations in the Mexican state of Tamaulipas, which can be sorted by their call signs, frequencies, location, ownership, names, and programming formats.

Radio stations in Tamaulipas
Call sign	Frequency	Location	Owner	Name	Format
XEFD-AM	590 AM	Río Bravo	Corporadio Gape de Tamaulipas, S.A. de C.V.	La Mejor 590 AM	Regional Mexican
XEGH-AM	620 AM + 89.1 FM	Río Bravo	Ernesto Montemayor Ibarra	La Lupe	Spanish adult hits
XEERO-AM	630 AM	Esteros	Gobierno del Estado de Tamaulipas	Radio Tamaulipas	Public radio
XETAM-AM	640 AM + 96.1 FM	Ciudad Victoria	XETAM-AM, S.A. de C.V.	Romántica	Romantic
XETMEP-AM	780 AM	Tampico	Escápate al Paraíso, S.A. de C.V.	Arre en Akustik	Regional mexican
XEFE-AM	790 AM	Nuevo Laredo	Hera de Zeus, S.A. de C.V.	La Radio de Nuevo Laredo	News/talk and Spanish classic hits
XEFW-AM	810 AM + 88.5 FM	Tampico	Radio Centinela, S.A. de C.V.	Hits FM	Pop in spanish
XERDO-AM	1060 AM	Brecha 73	Radio Avanzado Gal de Valle Hermoso, S.A. de C.V.	La Raza	Regional Mexican
XERT-AM	1170 AM	Reynosa	Publicidad Unida de Reynosa, S.A. de C.V.	La Más Picuda	Regional Mexican
XETUT-AM	1280 AM	Tula	Gobierno del Estado de Tamaulipas	Radio Tamaulipas	Public radio
XEAM-AM	1310 AM	Matamoros	Medios Masivos de Tamaulipas, S.A. de C.V.	La Radio de Matamoros	News/talk and Spanish classic hits
XEOR-AM	1390 AM	Ciudad Río Bravo	Radiodifusoras El Gallo, S.A. de C.V.	NotiGape	News/talk
XEEW-AM	1420 AM	Matamoros	Jorge Cárdenas Dávila	W 1420	News/talk
XEVIC-AM	1480 AM	Ciudad Victoria	Gobierno del Estado de Tamaulipas	Radio Tamaulipas	Public radio
XEFCR-AM	1670 AM	Reynosa	Fomento Cultural Reynosa, A.C.	Focus Radio	News/talk
XHFW-FM	88.5 FM + 810 AM	Tampico	Radio Centinela, S.A. de C.V.	Hits FM	Pop in spanish
XHLDO-FM	88.9 FM	Nuevo Laredo	Gobierno del Estado de Tamaulipas	Radio Tamaulipas	Public radio
XHCAO-FM	89.1 FM + 620 AM	Ciudad Camargo	Radio Ultra, S.A. de C.V.	La Lupe	Spanish adult hits
XHPEES-FM	89.3 FM	Ciudad Victoria	Impulsora Tamaholipa, A.C.	La Raza	Regional Mexican
XHTOT-FM	89.3 FM	Tampico	Radio Cañón, S.A. de C.V.	Vox FM	Adult Contemporary
XHRV-FM	89.5 FM	Valle Hermoso	Comercial Libertas, S.A. de C.V.	La Mera Mera	Regional Mexican
XHRYS-FM	90.1 FM	Reynosa	Radio Informativa, S.A. de C.V.	Ultra 90.1 FM	Contemporary hit radio
XHMU-FM	90.1 FM	Tampico	Estereo Vida de Tampico, S.A. de C.V.	Ke Buena	Regional Mexican
XHCGO-FM	90.5 FM	Ciudad Camargo	Gobierno del Estado de Tamaulipas	Radio Tamaulipas	Public radio
XHK-FM	90.9 FM	Nuevo Laredo	Eduardo Villarreal Marroquin	La Grande	Regional Mexican
XHRYA-FM	90.9 FM	Reynosa	Patronato Pro-Radio Cultural de Reynosa, A.C.	Más Music	Contemporary hit radio
XHTPI-FM	90.9 FM	Tampico	Gobierno del Estado de Tamaulipas	Radio Tamaulipas	Public radio
XHVLN-FM	90.9 FM	Villagrán	Gobierno del Estado de Tamaulipas	Radio Tamaulipas	Public radio
XHECM-FM	91.1 FM	Ciudad Mante	Radio Sistema del Centro, S.A. de C.V.	Bonita	Adult contemporary
XHMLS-FM	91.3 FM	Matamoros	Radiodifusoras Gal de Matamoros, S.A. de C.V.	Éxitos 91.3	Contemporary hit radio
XHNOE-FM	91.3 FM	Nuevo Laredo	X.H.N.O.E. FM, S.A. de C.V.	Stereo 91	Talk
XHSOT-FM	91.3 FM	Soto la Marina	Gobierno del Estado de Tamaulipas	Radio Tamaulipas	Public radio
XHCSAF-FM	91.3 FM	Tampico	Elsa María Esther Cuellar Armenta	—N/a	—N/a
XHCPGH-FM	91.7 FM	San Fernando	Gobierno del Estado de Tamaulipas	Radio Tamaulipas	Public radio
XHEOQ-FM	91.7 FM	Río Bravo	Corporadio Gape de Tamaulipas, S.A. de C.V.	NotiGape	News/talk
XHRLM-FM	91.9 FM	Ciudad Mante	Radio Sistema del Centro, S.A. de C.V.	Exa FM	Contemporary hit radio
XHCCCN-FM	92.5 FM	Ciudad Victoria	Grupo Eshersa, S.A. de C.V.	La Sabrosita	Regional Mexican
XHRRT-FM	92.5 FM	Tampico	Radio Transmisora Tamaulipeca, S.A.	La Poderosa	Regional Mexican
XHZD-FM	92.7 FM	Ciudad Camargo	Radio Camargo, S.A.	La Mandona	Regional Mexican
XHAAA-FM	93.1 FM	Reynosa	La Voz de Linares, S.A.	La Caliente	Regional Mexican
XHO-FM	93.5 FM	Matamoros	Radiodifusoras El Gallo, S.A. de C.V.	NotiGape	News/talk
XHSCIK-FM	93.7 FM	Reynosa	Voces de Ayuda de Locutores Unidos Por Los Que Menos Tienen, A.C.	—N/a	—N/a
XHRAW-FM	93.9 FM	Ciudad Alemán	Rolando Ramiro González Treviño	93.9 FM	Regional Mexican
XHYP-FM	93.9 FM	Ciudad Mante (El Limón)	Radiodifusora del Sur, S.A. de C.V.	La Chabela	Regional Mexican
XHTLN-FM	94.1 FM	Nuevo Laredo	GIM Televisión Nacional, S.A. de C.V.	Imagen Radio	News/talk
XHBJ-FM	94.5 FM	Ciudad Victoria (Benito Juárez)	Radio Televisora de Ciudad Victoria, S.A. de C.V.	Exa FM	Contemporary hit radio
XHTPO-FM	94.5 FM	Tampico	Multimedios Radio, S.A. de C.V.	La Caliente	Regional Mexican
XHMAE-FM	94.9 FM	Ciudad Mante	Gobierno del Estado de Tamaulipas	Radio Tamaulipas	Public radio
XHCCCM-FM	94.9 FM	Soto la Marina	Alfredo Talip Rivera	Radio Mar	Regional Mexican
XHTW-FM	94.9 FM	Tampico	Multimedios Radio, S.A. de C.V.	La Lupe	Spanish adult hits
XHLRS-FM	95.3 FM	Ciudad Victoria	Radio Informativa, S.A. de C.V.	La Lupe	Spanish adult hits
XHRT-FM	95.3 FM	Reynosa	XHRT-FM, S.A. de C.V.	@FM	Contemporary hit radio
XHOX-FM	95.3 FM	Tampico	Stereorey México, S.A.	Exa FM	Contemporary hit radio
XHXO-FM	95.7 FM	Ciudad Mante	Sistema Radiofónico de Tamaulipas, S.A. de C.V.	La Súper Buena	Regional Mexican
XHBK-FM	95.7 FM	Nuevo Laredo	Televisión y Sistemas, S.A. de C.V.	Pure Country	Country
XHWD-FM	95.9 FM	Ciudad Miguel Alemán	Radio Fronterizo El Heraldo, S.A. de C.V.	La Pistolera	Regional Mexican
XHTAM-FM	96.1 FM + 640 AM	Ciudad Victoria	XETAM-AM, S.A. de C.V.	Romántica	Romantic
XHNLT-FM	96.1 FM	Nuevo Laredo	Transmisora Regional Radio Fórmula, S.A. de C.V.	Radio Fórmula	News/talk
XHON-FM	96.1 FM	Tampico	Multimedios Radio, S.A. de C.V.	Classic	English classic hits
XHHI-FM	96.3 FM	Ciudad Miguel Alemán	Media & Radio Comercializadora, S.A. de C.V.	La Mera Mera	Regional Mexican
XHGNK-FM	96.7 FM	Nuevo Laredo	Multimedios Radio, S.A. de C.V.	La Lupe	Spanish adult hits
XHHF-FM	96.9 FM	Tampico	Grupo Radial de Tampico, S.A. de C.V.	El Heraldo Radio	News/talk
XHNLO-FM	97.1 FM	Nuevo Laredo	Multimedios Radio, S.A. de C.V.	La Caliente	Regional Mexican
XHHP-FM	97.5 FM	Ciudad Victoria	Victoria Radio Publicidad, S.A. de C.V.	La Más Prendida	Regional Mexican
XEEW-FM	97.7 FM	Matamoros	Sucesión de Jorge Cárdenas González	Los 40	Contemporary hit radio
XHRW-FM	97.7 FM	Tampico	XHRW FM-Tampico, S.A. de C.V.	Los 40	Contemporary hit radio
XHETO-FM	98.5 FM	Tampico	Radio Tiempo, S.A. de C.V.	Romántica	Romantic
XHEMY-FM	98.7 FM	Ciudad Mante	Radio Tamaulipas, S.A. de C.V.	La Jefa	Regional Mexican
XHGW-FM	99.3 FM	Ciudad Victoria	Radio Sistema de Victoria, S.A. de C.V.	Radio Fórmula	News/talk
XHNK-FM	99.3 FM	Nuevo Laredo	XHNK, S.A.	Los 40	Contemporary hit radio
XHJT-FM	100.1 FM	Tampico	Stereorey México, S.A.	La Mejor FM	Regional Mexican
XHS-FM	100.9 FM	Tampico	Radio Televisora de Tampico, S.A.	Oreja FM	Spanish adult hits
XHAS-FM	101.5 FM	Nuevo Laredo	Publicidad Radiofónica de Nuevo Laredo, S.A. de C.V.	Fiesta Mexicana	Regional Mexican
XHAVO-FM	101.5 FM	Río Bravo	Radio Ultra, S.A. de C.V.	Digital 101.5	Contemporary hit radio
XHVIR-FM	101.7 FM	Ciudad Victoria	Organización Radio Difusora Tamaulipeca, S.A. de C.V.	La Cotorra	Regional Mexican
XHENU-FM	101.9 FM	Nuevo Laredo	Publicidad Unida del Norte, S.A. de C.V.	La Rancherita	Regional Mexican
XHMW-FM	102.3 FM	Nuevo Laredo	XHMW-FM, S.A. de C.V.	Stereo Vida	Adult contemporary
XHUNI-FM	102.5 FM	Ciudad Victoria	Universidad Autónoma de Tamaulipas	Radio UAT	University radio
XHRR-FM	102.5 FM	Reynosa	Radio Ultra, S.A. de C.V.	La Ley 102.5	Regional Mexican
XHMRT-FM	102.5 FM	Tampico	Martha Morales Reséndiz	Radio Oasis Vida	Christian
XHRI-FM	102.9 FM	Reynosa	Radio Impulsora, S.A.	Radio Rey	Spanish classic hits
XHMDR-FM	103.1 FM	Ciudad Madero	GIM Televisión Nacional, S.A. de C.V.	Imagen Radio	News/talk
XHRKS-FM	103.3 FM	Reynosa	Grupo Radiofónico de Reynosa, S.A. de C.V.	La Poderosa	Regional Mexican
XHEOLA-FM	103.5 FM	Tampico	Musica Radiofónica, S.A. de C.V.	La Huasteca	Regional Mexican
XHWL-FM	103.7 FM	Nuevo Laredo	Radiodifusoras Cortés, S.A.	La Poderosa	Regional Mexican
XHMTS-FM	103.9 FM	Tampico	Transmisora Regional Radio Fórmula, S.A. de C.V.	Radio Fórmula	News/talk
XHRPV-FM	104.1 FM	Ciudad Victoria (Benito Juárez)	Radio Televisora de Ciudad Victoria, S.A. de C.V.	La V de Victoria	Spanish adult contemporary
XHERP-FM	104.7 FM	Tampico	Radiodifusión Huasteca, S.A.	Boom FM	Classic hits
XHCPAZ-FM	105.1 FM	Tampico	Universidad Autónoma de Tamaulipas	Radio UAT	University radio
XHNA-FM	105.9 FM	Matamoros	XHNA-FM, S.A. de C.V.	La Mega	Regional Mexican
XHVTH-FM	107.1 FM	Matamoros	La Voz de Linares, S.A.	La Comadre	Spanish adult hits
XHGTS-FM	107.3 FM	Nuevo Laredo	Radio BMP de Nuevo Laredo, S.A. de C.V.	Laredo's Classic Hits	English classic hits
XHVIC-FM	107.9 FM	Ciudad Victoria	Gobierno del Estado de Tamaulipas	Radio Tamaulipas	Public radio

== Defunct stations ==
- XEMT-AM 1340, Matamoros
- XHMTO-FM 92.3, Matamoros
- XEZD-AM 1350, Ciudad Camargo (1962–c. 2018)
- XEWD-AM 1430, Ciudad Camargo
- XEHI-AM 1470 Ciudad Miguel Alemán
- XEMS-AM 1490, Matamoros
- XHSAF-FM 100.9, San Fernando
- XHSFT-FM 103.7, San Fernando (1988–2019)
- XHCPCW-FM 88.1, Tampico
- XHTIO-FM 105.5, Tampico
- XHMAO-FM 90.9, Matamoros
- XHRYN-FM 90.5, Reynosa
- XHMTE-FM 92.3, Ciudad Mante
- XHNLR-FM 104.9, Nuevo Laredo
