= 1470 AM =

AM radio frequency

The following radio stations broadcast on AM frequency 1470 kHz: 1470 AM is a Regional broadcast frequency.

== Argentina ==
- LT20 in Junin, Buenos Aires.
- LT26 in Colon, Entre Rios.
- LT28 in Rafaela, Santa Fe.
- LU26 in Coronel Dorrego, Buenos Aires.
- Cadena AM 1470 in Lanús, Buenos Aires.

== Canada ==
- CJVB in Vancouver, British Columbia - 50 kW, transmitter located at 49.192951°N 123.02237°W

== Mexico ==
- XEAI-AM in Mexico City
- XEACE-AM in Mazatlán, Sinaloa
- XEBAL-AM in Bécal, Campeche
- XEHI-AM in Ciudad Miguel Alemán, Tamaulipas
- XEHC-AM in Tijuana, Baja California

== United States ==
Call sign	City of license	Facility ID	Class	Daytime power (kW)	Nighttime power (kW)	Unlimited power (kW)	Transmitter coordinates
KBSN	Moses Lake, Washington	35597	B	5	1		47.104444°N 119.292222°W
KDHN	Dimmitt, Texas	12297	D	0.5	0.149		34.586389°N 102.309722°W
KELA	Centralia-Chehalis, Washington	32996	B	5	1		46.696389°N 122.956389°W
KFMZ	Brookfield, Missouri	2	D	0.5	0.02		39.840556°N 93.081111°W
KGND	Vinita, Oklahoma	17035	D	0.5	0.088		36.645833°N 95.126111°W
KHND	Harvey, North Dakota	53309	D	1	0.161		47.756389°N 99.918333°W
KIID	Sacramento, California	65482	B	5	1		38.591667°N 121.462778°W
KKTY	Douglas, Wyoming	38387	B	1	0.5		42.763333°N 105.392222°W
KLCL	Lake Charles, Louisiana	53646	B	5	0.5		30.258611°N 93.268611°W
KMAL	Malden, Missouri	4153	D	1			36.552222°N 89.978333°W
KMNQ	Brooklyn Park, Minnesota	101	B	5	5		45.088056°N 93.383056°W
KNXN	Sierra Vista, Arizona	57528	D	2.5	0.04		31.548611°N 110.244444°W
KSMM	Liberal, Kansas	36752	D	1	0.17		37.065278°N 100.866389°W
KUTY	Palmdale, California	22011	B	5	5		34.665278°N 118.011111°W
KWAY	Waverly, Iowa	544	D	1	0.061		42.703611°N 92.4725°W
KWRD	Henderson, Texas	71519	D	5	0.083		32.181944°N 94.796944°W
KWSL	Sioux City, Iowa	8769	D	2.3	0.069		42.411944°N 96.426667°W
KXSL	Show Low, Arizona	33693	D	5	0.087		34.263611°N 110.038611°W
KYYW	Abilene, Texas	40997	D	5	0.11		32.492222°N 99.751944°W
WAZN	Watertown, Massachusetts	70523	B	1.4	3.4		42.413611°N 71.211111°W
WBCR	Alcoa, Tennessee	5887	D	1	0.077		35.767778°N 84.015833°W
WBFC	Stanton, Kentucky	31074	D	2.5	0.025		37.882778°N 83.882222°W
WBOM	Meriden, Connecticut	1220	B	2.5	2.5		41.553889°N 72.801944°W
WBTX	Broadway-Timberville, Virginia	40649	D	5	0.036		38.623333°N 78.814444°W
WCHJ	Brookhaven, Mississippi	6315	D	1	0.066		31.562778°N 90.4475°W
WCLA	Claxton, Georgia	65608	B	1	0.17		32.166944°N 81.901944°W
WGNR	Anderson, Indiana	2214	D	1	0.036		40.061944°N 85.710278°W
WJDY	Salisbury, Maryland	13672	D	5	0.043		38.391667°N 75.646667°W
WKUM	Orocovis, Puerto Rico	54782	B	2.4	3.7		18.256667°N 66.416667°W
WLAM	Lewiston, Maine	64434	B			5	44.063056°N 70.25°W
WLOA	Farrell, Pennsylvania	47569	B	1	0.5		41.199444°N 80.522778°W
WMBD	Peoria, Illinois	42119	B	5	5		40.572778°N 89.533333°W
WMGG	Egypt Lake, Florida	67135	B	2.8	0.8		28.011667°N 82.498056°W
WNAU	New Albany, Mississippi	7070	B	2.5	0.5		34.496667°N 89.014444°W
WNWF	Evergreen, Alabama	73372	D	1	0.177		31.441389°N 86.935556°W
WNYY	Ithaca, New York	32391	B	5	1		42.391667°N 76.475°W
WPDM	Potsdam, New York	62134	D	1	0.044		44.643889°N 75.057778°W
WPIF	Georgetown, South Carolina	3900	D	1	0.147		33.370833°N 79.2775°W
WQXL	Columbia, South Carolina	41333	D	11	0.1		33.959444°N 81.041111°W
WRGA	Rome, Georgia	40856	B	5	5		34.301389°N 85.155278°W
WRYU	West Bend, Wisconsin	71541	B	2.5	2.5		43.370556°N 88.166111°W
WSAN	Allentown, Pennsylvania	18233	B	5	5		40.636111°N 75.485°W
WTOE	Spruce Pine, North Carolina	46322	D	5	0.103		35.906667°N 82.105833°W
WTTR	Westminster, Maryland	59975	B	0.54	0.035		39.577222°N 77.022778°W
WTZE	Tazewell, Virginia	64664	D	1			37.1325°N 81.555833°W
WVOL	Berry Hill, Tennessee	52522	B	5	1		36.200278°N 86.779722°W
WWBG	Greensboro, North Carolina	67831	B	10	5		36.150278°N 79.913333°W
WWNN	Pompano Beach, Florida	73930	B	30	2.5		26.179444°N 80.220833°W
WXAG	Athens, Georgia	40974	D	1			33.987222°N 83.338056°W
