= XEZD-AM =

Radio station in Ciudad Camargo, Tamaulipas

- Ciudad Camargo, Tamaulipas; Mexico
- Frequencies: 1350 kHz (to move to 92.7 MHz - XHZD-FM)
- Branding: La Mandona

Programming
- Format: Regional Mexican

Ownership
- Owner: Corporativo Radiofónico de México; (Radio Camargo, S.A.)
- Sister stations: XEAM-AM XEHI-AM XHLE-FM; XEFE XEMT-AM XHMCA-FM

History
- First air date: January 4, 1962 (concession)

Technical information
- Licensing authority: CRT
- Class: B
- Power: 250 watts

Links
- Website: grupomiradio.mx

XEZD-AM (1350 kHz) is a radio station in Ciudad Camargo, Tamaulipas. It is owned by Corporativo Radiofónico de México and known as La Mandona, carrying a Regional Mexican format.

== History ==
XEZD received its concession on January 4, 1962. It was owned by Román Garza Sánchez and initially operated on 1400 kHz before moving to 1350 within a few years of signing on. The concession was transferred to Radio Camargo, S.A., in 1982.

In 2017, station group Grupo Mi Radio became known as Corporativo Radiofónico de México after it was sold by Roberto Chapa Zavala to businessman Luis Alfredo Biassi.

XEZD is expected to be moved to FM sometime in the future, although it remains uncertain.
