= XEHI-AM =

Radio station in Ciudad Miguel Alemán, Tamaulipas

- Ciudad Miguel Alemán, Tamaulipas; Mexico
- Frequencies: 1470 AM (to move to 96.3 FM - XHHI-FM)

Ownership
- Owner: Corporativo Radiofónico de México; (Antonio Gallegos González)
- Sister stations: XEAM-AM XELE-AM XEMT-AM; XEMCA-AM XEZD-AM XEFE-AM

History
- First air date: March 13, 1953

Technical information
- Licensing authority: CRT
- Class: B
- Power: 10 kWs daytime 250 watts nighttime

Links
- Website: Mi Radio online

XEHI-AM is a Spanish-language radio station in Ciudad Miguel Alemán, Tamaulipas, Mexico on 1470 AM.

== History ==
XEHI received its concession on March 13, 1953. It was owned by Gustavo Gómez Paez. XEHI raised its daytime power by the 1980s (to 3,000 watts from 1,000).

In 1998, the station was acquired by Maida Tomasita and Melisa Gómez Stringel, who in turn sold it to Gallegos González in 2005.

In 2017, station group Grupo Mi Radio became known as Corporativo Radiofónico de México after it was sold by Roberto Chapa Zavala to businessman Luis Alfredo Biassi.
