= 1390 AM =

AM radio frequency

The following radio stations broadcast on AM frequency 1390 kHz: 1390 AM is a Regional broadcast frequency.

== Argentina ==
- LR11 in La Plata, Buenos Aires
- LRA6 in Valle de Uspallata, Mendoza (960 kHz. Defunct?)

== Guatemala (Channel 86) ==
- TGYC in Guatemala City

== Mexico ==
- XEUPG-AM in San Nicolás de los Garza, Nuevo León
- XEOR-AM in Río Bravo, Tamaulipas

== United States ==
| Call sign | City of license | Facility ID | Class | Daytime power (kW) | Nighttime power (kW) | Unlimited power | Transmitter coordinates |
|---|---|---|---|---|---|---|---|
| KBBO | Yakima, Washington | 49875 | D | 1.4 | 0.005 | | 46.571389°N 120.454167°W |
| KBEC | Waxahachie, Texas | 21233 | B | 0.48 | 0.26 | | 32.445833°N 96.804167°W |
| KCLN | Clinton, Iowa | 33055 | D | 1 | 0.091 | | 41.909444°N 90.224444°W |
| KCRC | Enid, Oklahoma | 10856 | B | | | 1 | 36.419722°N 97.874444°W |
| KDQN | De Queen, Arkansas | 30600 | D | 0.5 | | | 34.0325°N 94.328611°W |
| KENN | Farmington, New Mexico | 33953 | B | 5 | 1.3 | | 36.7075°N 108.147222°W |
| KFFK | Rogers, Arkansas | 31882 | D | 0.8 | | | 36.388333°N 94.192778°W |
| KFRA | Franklin, Louisiana | 22307 | B | 0.5 | 0.244 | | 29.837222°N 91.539444°W |
| KGNU | Denver, Colorado | 31349 | D | 5 | 0.139 | | 39.658056°N 105.013611°W |
| KJAM | Madison, South Dakota | 39580 | D | 0.5 | 0.062 | | 44.010278°N 97.171667°W |
| KJPW | Waynesville, Missouri | 53877 | D | 5 | 0.111 | | 37.819167°N 92.151667°W |
| KLGN | Logan, Utah | 63831 | B | 5 | 0.5 | | 41.734444°N 111.853611°W |
| KLOC | Turlock, California | 60426 | B | 5 | 5 | | 37.53°N 120.693611°W |
| KLTX | Long Beach, California | 58625 | B | 5 | 3.6 | | 33.891667°N 118.184167°W |
| KNCK | Concordia, Kansas | 35210 | D | 0.5 | 0.054 | | 39.566111°N 97.684444°W |
| KRFO | Owatonna, Minnesota | 30121 | D | 0.5 | 0.094 | | 44.073889°N 93.18°W |
| KRRZ | Minot, North Dakota | 9679 | B | 5 | 1 | | 48.2125°N 101.241667°W |
| KULP | El Campo, Texas | 3710 | D | 0.5 | 0.18 | | 29.209444°N 96.263889°W |
| KXSS | Waite Park, Minnesota | 60493 | B | 2.5 | 1 | | 45.541944°N 94.261389°W |
| KZGD | Salem, Oregon | 72475 | B | 5 | 0.69 | | 44.995278°N 123.070833°W |
| WABB | Belton, South Carolina | 10076 | D | 1 | 0.017 | | 34.588611°N 82.538056°W |
| WAJD | Gainesville, Florida | 24209 | D | 5 | 0.051 | | 29.665556°N 82.290556°W |
| WAVP | Avon Park, Florida | 72684 | D | 1 | 0.077 | | 27.617778°N 81.496944°W |
| WBHV | State College, Pennsylvania | 64849 | B | 2 | 1 | | 40.808333°N 77.942222°W |
| WBLL | Bellefontaine, Ohio | 69627 | D | 0.5 | 0.081 | | 40.368056°N 83.733889°W |
| WEED | Rocky Mount, North Carolina | 54825 | D | 5 | 0.03 | | 35.961944°N 77.826389°W |
| WEGP | Presque Isle, Maine | 9423 | B | 5 | 5 | | 46.654167°N 68.05°W |
| WEOK | Poughkeepsie, New York | 71513 | D | 5 | 0.106 | | 41.720556°N 73.908056°W |
| WFBL | Syracuse, New York | 34821 | B | 5 | 5 | | 43.152778°N 76.193056°W |
| WFIW | Fairfield, Illinois | 71167 | D | 0.71 | 0.058 | | 38.379444°N 88.325833°W |
| WGRB | Chicago, Illinois | 51162 | B | 5 | 5 | | 41.736944°N 87.7°W |
| WHMA | Anniston, Alabama | 6811 | B | 5 | 1 | | 33.708611°N 85.853889°W |
| WISA | Isabela, Puerto Rico | 29218 | B | | | 1 | 18.501667°N 67.033611°W |
| WJRM | Troy, North Carolina | 43632 | D | 1 | 0.035 | | 35.361944°N 79.860556°W |
| WKIC | Hazard, Kentucky | 43981 | D | 5 | | | 37.239167°N 83.210833°W |
| WKLP | Keyser, West Virginia | 62340 | D | 1 | 0.074 | | 39.436667°N 78.955833°W |
| WLAN | Lancaster, Pennsylvania | 52260 | D | 1.1 | 0.018 | | 40.060556°N 76.316389°W |
| WLCM | Holt, Michigan | 42076 | B | 5 | 4.5 | | 42.567222°N 84.866111°W (daytime); 42.551944°N 84.551389°W (nighttime) |
| WMCT | Mountain City, Tennessee | 31887 | D | 1 | 0.058 | | 36.49°N 81.787222°W |
| WMER | Meridian, Mississippi | 48542 | D | 5 | 0.101 | | 32.344722°N 88.692222°W |
| WMPO | Middleport-Pomeroy, Ohio | 18021 | D | 5 | 0.12 | | 39.010278°N 82.066111°W |
| WNIO | Youngstown, Ohio | 13669 | B | 9.5 | 4.8 | | 41.121389°N 80.701389°W (daytime); 40.986389°N 80.598333°W (nighttime) |
| WNLA | Indianola, Mississippi | 59971 | D | 1 | 0.015 | | 33.478056°N 90.641111°W |
| WOHS | Shelby, North Carolina | 70669 | D | 0.7 | 0.016 | | 35.291111°N 81.5675°W |
| WPLI | Lynchburg, Virginia | 59709 | D | 4.7 | 0.034 | | 37.464444°N 79.1225°W |
| WPLM | Plymouth, Massachusetts | 52837 | B | 5 | 5 | | 41.968056°N 70.701667°W |
| WRIG | Schofield, Wisconsin | 73946 | B | 10 | 7.2 | | 44.878333°N 89.641389°W |
| WRIV | Riverhead, New York | 14647 | D | 1 | 0.064 | | 40.915278°N 72.657778°W |
| WROA | Gulfport, Mississippi | 17478 | D | 0.9 | 0.035 | | 30.429167°N 89.018889°W |
| WSPO | Charleston, South Carolina | 60038 | B | 5 | 5 | | 32.824444°N 80.002778°W |
| WTJF | Jackson, Tennessee | 14742 | B | 5 | 1 | | 35.646111°N 88.8325°W (daytime); 35.647222°N 88.833333°W (nighttime) |
| WTNL | Reidsville, Georgia | 73931 | D | 0.28 | 0.035 | | 32.087222°N 82.13°W |
| WWTM | Decatur, Alabama | 54328 | D | 0.35 | | | 34.612222°N 86.991111°W |
| WYXI | Athens, Tennessee | 13931 | D | 2.5 | 0.062 | | 35.446667°N 84.571944°W |
| WZHF | Capitol Heights, Maryland | 73306 | B | 9 | 1 | | 38.869167°N 76.896389°W |
| WZZB | Seymour, Indiana | 58381 | D | 1 | 0.074 | | 38.975833°N 85.889167°W |
