= XEEW =

Two radio stations in Matamoros, Tamaulipas bear the callsign XEEW:

- XEEW-AM 1420, "W1420"
- XEEW-FM 97.7, "Los 40"
