= XEFE =

XEFE may refer to:

- XEFE-TV, a television station serving the Laredo-Nuevo Laredo Metropolitan Area
- XEFE-AM, a radio station serving the Laredo-Nuevo Laredo Metropolitan Area
