= XHRRT-FM =

Radio station in Tampico, Tamaulipas

- Tampico, Tamaulipas; Mexico
- Frequency: 92.5 FM
- RDS: LA PODER OSA 92.5 FM LA QUE TE GUSTA
- Branding: La Poderosa

Programming
- Format: Regional Mexican and Spanish adult hits
- Affiliations: Grupo Radiorama

Ownership
- Owner: Grupo AS; (Radio Transmisora Tamaulipeca, S.A.)
- Sister stations: XHS-FM, XHHF-FM, XHERP-FM, XHRW-FM, XHAR-FM, XHETO-FM, XHMU-FM

History
- First air date: April 16, 1961 (concession)
- Former call signs: XERRT-AM
- Former frequencies: 1190 kHz, 1270 kHz

Technical information
- Licensing authority: CRT
- Class: B1
- ERP: 25,000 watts
- HAAT: 55.3 m (181 ft)
- Transmitter coordinates: 22°14′10″N 97°51′54″W

Links
- Webcast: lapoderosalaquetegusta.com
- Website: grupoasradio.com

XHRRT-FM is a radio station in Tampico, Tamaulipas. Broadcasting on 92.5 FM, it is owned by Grupo AS and affiliated with Grupo Radiorama. It is known as La Poderosa, carrying a Regional Mexican and Spanish-language adult hits format.

== History ==
XERRT-AM received its concession on April 16, 1961. It originally broadcast from Ciudad Madero on 1190 kHz as a 500-watt daytimer. By the end of the 1960s, XERRT was moved to 1270 kHz and began broadcasting with 250 watts during the day and 200 at night. A 1990s power hike brought XERRT to 2,000 watts during the day and 500 at night.

In 2011, XERRT was authorized to migrate to FM as XHRRT-FM on 92.5 MHz.

On June 4, 2018, XHRRT changed from Voz FM to One FM with an electronic music format.

On August 1, 2019, XHRRT changed again from One FM to the news and talk programming of El Heraldo Radio relaying XHDL-FM from Mexico City.

On October 1, 2026, XHRRT 92.5 and XHHF exchanged formats; El Heraldo Radio was moved to 96.9.
