= Xho =

Xho or XHO may refer to:

- the ISO 639 code for the Xhosa language
- XHO-FM, a Spanish news/talk radio station for Brownsville, Texas
- XHO-TDT, a repeater station in Torreón, Mexico, for the TV network Las Estrellas
