= XHECM-FM =

Radio station in Ciudad Mante, Tamaulipas, Mexico

- Ciudad Mante, Tamaulipas; Mexico
- Frequency: 91.1 FM
- Branding: Bonita

Programming
- Format: Spanish/English Romantic, Pop and Adult Contemporary music

Ownership
- Owner: Organización Radiofónica Tamaulipeca; (Radio Sistema del Centro, S.A. de C.V.)
- Sister stations: XHRLM-FM, XHYP-FM, XHXO-FM, XHEMY-FM

History
- First air date: November 9, 1951 (concession)
- Call sign meaning: Ciudad Mante

Technical information
- Licensing authority: CRT
- Class: B1
- ERP: 25 kW
- HAAT: 35 m (115 ft)
- Transmitter coordinates: 22°48′54″N 98°56′45″W

Links
- Website: Bonita 91.1 FM Website

XHECM-FM (branded as Bonita) is a Spanish-language FM radio station in Ciudad Mante, Tamaulipas, Mexico.

Its broadcast hours are from 6:00 a.m. to 8:00 p.m.

== History ==
XECM-AM 1450 received its concession on November 9, 1951. The station was owned by Ricardo López Méndez and broadcast with 1,000 watts day and 250 night. It migrated to FM in 2012 after being approved to do so in December 2011.
