= XHEOQ-FM =

Radio station in Río Bravo–Reynosa, Tamaulipas, Mexico

- Río Bravo, Tamaulipas; Mexico
- Broadcast area: McAllen–Reynosa
- Frequency: 91.7 MHz (HD Radio)
- Branding: NotiGAPE

Programming
- Format: Adult Contemporary Spanish news / talk
- Affiliations: Radio Fórmula

Ownership
- Owner: Grupo Gape Radio; (Corporadio Gape de Tamaulipas, S.A. de C.V.)
- Sister stations: XEFD-AM, XHO-FM, XEOR-AM

History
- First air date: 1 July 1960; 66 years ago (concession)
- Former call signs: XEOQ-AM (1960–2020)
- Former frequencies: 1110 kHz (1960–2020)

Technical information
- Licensing authority: CRT
- Class: A
- ERP: 3,000 watts
- HAAT: 95.8 m (314 ft)
- Transmitter coordinates: 25°59′49″N 98°09′06″W

Links
- Webcast: Listen live
- Website: notigape.com

XHEOQ-FM (91.7 MHz) is a Spanish news/talk radio radio station in Río Bravo that serves the McAllen, Texas (USA) / Reynosa, Tamaulipas (Mexico) border area.

== History ==
XEOQ-AM 1110 received its concession on July 1, 1960. It was originally owned by Baudelia Villagrana Martel.

The station began its AM-FM migration, signing on in July 2018.

Logo when broadcasting on 1110

The AM station was turned off in February 2020 after the required year of simulcasting.

== HD Radio ==
XHEOQ-FM broadcasts in HD Radio and broadcasts 3 subchannels. Aside from the HD1, these additional subchannels are also on XHO-FM:

- HD1: Notigape 91.7
- HD2: Radio Fórmula 1° Cadena
- HD3: W Radio
- HD4: El Heraldo Radio

No authorization is on file with the IFT for these additional services. The HD2 sub was ESPN Deportes Radio until that network ceased operations on September 8, 2019; Unanimo was created with the goal of attracting the network's former affiliates and talent.
