= XEMT-AM =

Radio station in Matamoros, Tamaulipas

Defunct
- Matamoros, Tamaulipas; Mexico
- Frequency: 1340 kHz

Ownership
- Owner: Corporativo Radiofónico de México; (XEMT de Matamoros, S.A. de C.V.)
- Sister stations: XEAM-AM, XEFE-AM, XHLE-FM, XHMCA-FM

History
- First air date: June 17, 1950
- Last air date: March 10, 2021 (renewal)
- Call sign meaning: "Matamoros"

Technical information
- Class: C
- Power: 600 watts

XEMT-AM was a radio station in Matamoros, Tamaulipas, Mexico. It broadcast from 1950 until 2021; it was last known as was Radio Diamante with a Spanish pop format.

== History ==
Logo as Nostalgia 1340

XEMT received its concession on June 17, 1950. It was owned by Severo Garza Saenz and broadcast with 250 watts. XEMT was bought by Radio Impulsora, S.A., in 1973, and by Radio Emisora del Noreste, S.A., in 1985. By this time, XEMT broadcast with 1,000 watts. It was sold in 2004 to the current concessionaire and cut its power to 600 watts.

On March 10, 2021, the Federal Telecommunications Institute denied an application for the renewal of XEMT-AM's concession. The station had failed to pay five of the ten installments of its last renewal, in addition to failure to file other obligatory reports or comply with needed changes to company bylaws.
