= XHBJ =

XHBJ may refer to:

- XHBJ-FM, a radio station (94.5 FM) in Benito Juárez, Tamaulipas, Mexico
- XHBJ-TDT, a television station (channel 27, virtual 45) in Tijuana, Baja California, Mexico
