= XHHP =

Two Mexican stations bear the callsign XHHP, both in the state of Tamaulipas:

- XHHP-FM 97.5, "La Más Prendida" in Ciudad Victoria
- XHHP-TV channel 3 (TDT 28) in Soto La Marina, transmitter for Azteca Trece
