= XHLI-FM =

XHLI-FM may refer to:

- XHLI-FM (Guerrero) in Chilpancingo, Máxima 94.7 FM and 1580 AM
- XHLI-FM (Tabasco) in Villahermosa, La Mejor 98.3 FM
