= XHSP-FM =

Radio station in Monterrey, Nuevo León, Mexico

- Monterrey, Nuevo León; Mexico
- Frequency: 99.7 MHz
- Branding: El Heraldo Radio

Programming
- Format: News / Talk

Ownership
- Owner: El Heraldo de México; (GA Radiocomunicaciones, S.A. de C.V.)

History
- First air date: May 15, 1973 (concession)
- Call sign meaning: Luis Ignacio Santibañez Patino

Technical information
- Licensing authority: CRT
- Class: B
- ERP: 50,000 watts
- HAAT: −59.4 meters (−195 ft)
- Transmitter coordinates: 25°39′27.0″N 100°20′04.1″W

Links
- Webcast: Listen live
- Website: heraldodemexico.com.mx

XHSP-FM is a radio station on 99.7 FM in Monterrey, Nuevo León. Mexico. The station is owned by El Heraldo de México with its El Heraldo Radio news format. The transmitter is atop Edificio Latino.

== History ==
XHSP was the first radio station owned by Grupo Radio México, a corporate cousin of GRC that merged into it in 2016. It received its concession on May 15, 1973, and it was then owned by Luis Ignacio Santibañez Patino. Radio Emisora XHSP-FM became the concessionaire in 1986; it eventually became the legal owner for almost all GRC stations in Monterrey, namely those that were formerly part of GRM.

In 2020, Grupo Radio Centro put ten stations up for sale, including XHSP-FM. The station was purchased by Heraldo Media Group, and La Invasora ended programming on May 30, 2021, making way for El Heraldo Radio to move from XHCHL-FM 90.1 to the stronger XHSP.
