= XEOR-AM =

Radio station in Río Bravo, Tamaulipas

- Río Bravo, Tamaulipas; Mexico
- Broadcast area: McAllen–Reynosa
- Frequency: 1390 AM
- Branding: Notigape 1390 AM

Programming
- Format: All-news radio Talk radio
- Affiliations: MVS Noticias; Imagen Informativa; Radio Fórmula

Ownership
- Owner: Grupo Gape Radio; (Radiodifusoras El Gallo, S.A. de C.V.)
- Sister stations: XEFD-AM, XHEOQ-FM, XHO-FM

History
- First air date: November 4, 1949

Technical information
- Licensing authority: CRT
- Class: B
- Power: 1,000 watts

Links
- Webcast: Listen live
- Website: notigape.com

XEOR-AM (branded as Notigape 1390 AM) is a Spanish news/talk radio station in Río Bravo that serves the McAllen, Texas (USA) / Reynosa, Tamaulipas (Mexico) border area.

== History ==
XEOR-AM received its concession on November 4, 1949.
