= XHAR-FM =

Radio station in Pueblo Viejo, Veracruz, serving Tampico, Tamaulipas

- Pueblo Viejo, Veracruz; Mexico
- Broadcast area: Tampico, Tamaulipas
- Frequency: 101.7 MHz
- RDS: 101.7 FM LA MEXICANA CON MUSICA DE HOY, AYER Y SIEMPRE
- Branding: La Mexicana

Programming
- Format: Regional Mexican

Ownership
- Owner: Grupo AS; (Comercializadora de Eventos Radiofónicos, S.A. de C.V.)
- Sister stations: XHRW-FM, XHMU-FM, XHETO-FM, XHS-FM, XHHF-FM, XHRRT-FM, XHERP-FM

History
- First air date: July 11, 1980 (concession)
- Former call signs: XEAR-AM
- Former frequencies: 1490 kHz, 660 kHz

Technical information
- Licensing authority: CRT
- Class: B1
- ERP: 12.5 kW
- HAAT: 71.1 m (233 ft)
- Transmitter coordinates: 22°11′43″N 97°50′07″W

Links
- Webcast: Listen Live La Mexicana 101.7
- Website: Grupo AS

XHAR-FM (branded as La Mexicana) is a Mexican Spanish-language FM radio station in Tampico, with transmitter at Pueblo Viejo, Veracruz.

== History ==
XEAR-AM 1490 received its concession on July 11, 1980. Owned by Enrique Cárdenas González, a future governor of Tamaulipas who owned various radio stations in the state, it broadcast with 1,000 watts. In 1990, XEAR was sold to Comercializadora de Eventos Radiofónicos, marking the beginning of Radiorama/Grupo AS operation of the station. In the decade that followed, it moved to 660 kHz and raised power to 5,000 watts during the day.

XEAR was accepted to migrate to FM in 2012.
