= Radio Tamaulipas =

State radio network of Tamaulipas, Mexico

- Tamaulipas; Mexico
- Frequency: (see table)
- Branding: Radio Tamaulipas

Programming
- Format: Public radio

Ownership
- Owner: Government of the State of Tamaulipas

History
- First air date: October 23, 1983 in XHVIC 107.9; From 1991 on the other repeaters
- Call sign meaning: (see table)

Technical information
- Licensing authority: CRT
- Class: (see table)
- ERP: (see table)
- HAAT: (see table)
- Repeater: (see table)

Links
- Webcast: Listen live
- Website: Website Radio Tamaulipas

Radio Tamaulipas is the state radio network of Tamaulipas, originating from studios in the capital of Ciudad Victoria and airing on seven FM and three AM transmitters in the state.

== Transmitters ==
Callsign	Frequency	City	Class	ERP/power	HAAT
XEVIC-AM*	1480	Ciudad Victoria	B	5 kW day.15 kW night	none
XHVIC-FM	107.9	Ciudad Victoria	C1	14.86 kW	665.6 m (2,184 ft)
XHCGO-FM	90.5	Cd. Camargo	B	30 kW	15 m (49 ft)
XHMAE-FM	94.9	Ciudad Mante	A	3 kW	30 m (98 ft)
XEERO-AM*	630	Esteros (Altamira)	C	1 kW day.15 kW night	none
XHLDO-FM	88.9	Nuevo Laredo	B1	15 kW	22.89 m (75.1 ft)
XHCPGH-FM	91.7	San Fernando	A	5 kW	−2.9 m (−9.5 ft)
XHSOT-FM	91.3	Soto la Marina	B1	15 kW	−2.9 m (−9.5 ft)
XHTPI-FM	90.9	Tampico	A	3 kW	44 m (144 ft)
XETUT-AM*	1280	Tula	C	1 kW (daytimer)	none
XHVLN-FM	90.9	Villagrán	AA	3 kW	152 m (499 ft)

=== Former transmitters ===
Two further transmitters no longer have valid permits:

Callsign	Frequency	City	ERP/power
XHMTO-FM	92.3	Matamoros	30 kW
XHSAF-FM	100.9	San Fernando	3 kW
