= XHRLM-FM =

Radio station in Ciudad Mante, Tamaulipas, Mexico

- Ciudad Mante, Tamaulipas; Mexico
- Frequency: 91.9 FM
- Branding: Exa FM

Programming
- Format: Contemporary hit radio
- Affiliations: MVS Radio

Ownership
- Owner: Organización Radiofónica Tamaulipeca; (Radio Sistema del Centro, S.A. de C.V.)
- Sister stations: XHECM-FM, XHYP-FM, XHXO-FM, XHEMY-FM

History
- First air date: May 9, 1978 (concession)
- Call sign meaning: Original owner Ricardo López Méndez

Technical information
- Licensing authority: CRT
- Class: B1
- ERP: 12,140 watts
- HAAT: 33.56 m (110.1 ft)

Links
- Website: ort.com.mx (ORT website) exafm.com (Exa FM site)

XHRLM-FM is a radio station on 91.9 FM in Ciudad Mante, Tamaulipas, Mexico. It carries the Exa FM national format from MVS Radio and is owned by Organización Radiofónica Tamaulipeca.

Its broadcast hours are from 6:00 a.m and 10:00 p.m.

== History ==
XHRLM received its concession in 1978. It was initially owned by Ricardo López Méndez, a former XEW announcer and poet. After his death in 1989, XHRLM was sold to Enrique Cárdenas González, a PRI politician, former mayor of Ciudad Victoria and one-time governor of Tamaulipas.
