= XHGW-FM =

Radio station in Ciudad Victoria, Tamaulipas

- Ciudad Victoria, Tamaulipas; Mexico
- Frequency: 99.3 MHz FM
- RDS: XHGW 99.3 RADIO FORMULA ORT
- Branding: Fórmula W

Programming
- Format: News/talk
- Affiliations: Radio Fórmula

Ownership
- Owner: Organización Radiofónica Tamaulipeca; (Radio Sistema de Victoria, S.A. de C.V.)
- Sister stations: XHBJ-FM, XHHP-FM, XHVIR-FM, XHRPV-FM

History
- First air date: March 25, 1958 (concession)
- Former call signs: XEGW-AM
- Former frequencies: 1380 kHz

Technical information
- Licensing authority: CRT
- Class: B1
- ERP: 5,380 watts (FM)
- HAAT: −117.8 m (−386 ft)
- Transmitter coordinates: 23°43′7.38″N 99°07′47.65″W

Links
- Website: ORT.com website

XHGW-FM is a radio station on 99.3 FM in Ciudad Victoria, Tamaulipas, Mexico, carrying Fórmula W programs.

== History ==
XEGW-AM 1380 received its concession on March 25, 1958, and when Jorge Cárdenas González transferred the concession to Enrique Cárdenas González in 1966, it became one of the first stations of ORT. Radio Sistema de Victoria became the concessionaire in 1986, and migration to FM was approved at the end of 2011.

On September 17, 2019, XHGW switched from Imagen Radio to Radio Fórmula programming.
