= XHUNI-FM =

Radio station of the Universidad Autónoma de Tamaulipas

- Ciudad Victoria, Tamaulipas; Mexico
- Frequency: 102.5 MHz
- Branding: Radio UAT

Programming
- Format: Cultural/university

Ownership
- Owner: Universidad Autónoma de Tamaulipas

History
- First air date: December 19, 1991
- Call sign meaning: UNIversidad

Technical information
- Licensing authority: CRT
- Class: B1; A
- ERP: 10 kW (XHUNI-FM); 2.84 kW (XHCPAZ-FM)
- HAAT: −164.9 m (−541 ft); 51.1 m (168 ft)
- Repeater: XHCPAZ-FM 105.1 (Tampico)

Links
- Website: radiouat.mx

Radio UAT is the radio service of the Universidad Autónoma de Tamaulipas in Mexico. The station broadcasts on XHUNI-FM 102.5 in the state capital of Ciudad Victoria and on XHCPAZ-FM 105.1 in Tampico.

== History ==
The UAT began producing radio programs in 1983, mostly being broadcast on other radio stations within the portion of their broadcast days reserved for the state. The first station, XHUNI-FM in Ciudad Victoria, came on air December 19, 1991, with its official opening two months later.

== Programming ==
Programming on Radio UAT includes a mix of music and cultural programs, as well as programming aimed at the UAT community such as the newscast Enlace Universitario.

== Transmitters ==
Radio UAT has two stations:

Radio UAT current transmitters
Call sign	Frequency	City	ERP
XHUNI-FM	102.5	Ciudad Victoria	10 kW
XHCPAZ-FM	105.1	Tampico	2.84 kW

== Former transmitters ==
From 1998 to 2019, Radio UAT maintained five low-power transmitters in other cities in Tamaulipas. A failure to file a timely renewal led to their deletion in 2015; the stations continued operating for several more years.

Radio UAT former transmitters
Call sign	Frequency	City	ERP
XHMAO-FM	90.9	Matamoros	.017 kW
XHRYN-FM	90.5	Reynosa	.017 kW
XHMTE-FM	92.3	Ciudad Mante	.017 kW
XHNLR-FM	104.9	Nuevo Laredo	.015 kW
XHTIO-FM	105.5	Tampico	.02 kW
