= XEAI-AM =

Radio station in Mexico City

- Mexico City; Mexico
- Broadcast area: Greater Mexico City
- Frequency: 1470 AM
- Branding: Grupo Fórmula

Programming
- Format: Talk radio, oldies in Spanish

Ownership
- Owner: Grupo Fórmula; (La B Grande, S.A. de C.V.)
- Sister stations: XEDF-AM/XEDF-FM, XERFR-AM/XERFR-FM

History
- First air date: 1942
- Former call signs: XESM-AM

Technical information
- Licensing authority: CRT
- Class: B
- Power: 50 kW day 5 kW night
- Transmitter coordinates: 19°21′04.3″N 99°06′51.5″W

Links
- Webcast: Listen live
- Website: radioformula.com.mx

XEAI-AM is a radio station in Mexico City. Located on 1470 AM, XEAI-AM is owned by Grupo Fórmula talk radio network.

== History ==
Salvador San Martín obtained a radio concession for XESM in 1942. In the early 1980s, the station became notable for its "Radio Cañón" format, aimed at a youth audience and competing with such stations as XEEST-AM 1440; during this time XESM placed among the top five radio stations in the Mexico City area.

In 1991, the station was rebranded as "Rock Fórmula", with rock in Spanish from the 1960s and 1970s. This format, too, found success. However, from the 1990s on, wild changes in programming followed: "Jazz SM", which replaced the lost Jazz FM; norteña music as "La Tremenda" in the mid-90s; and oldies as "SM Vida 14-70" all followed.

In 2000, the station's callsign was changed to XEAI-AM, the original callsign of 1320 AM until its calls were changed in 1974 and later on sister 1500 AM until 1998. It became known as "Radio Fórmula 14-70 AM, Cadena Metrópoli", adopting a news-heavy format. Later on, the station was refocused to appeal to women as "Fórmula Femenina", although it dropped that name in 2017. In contrast to XERFR and XEDF, which are mostly focused on newscasts, XEAI consists of talk programs focused on topics like self-help and religion, as well as blocks of music programming with oldies in Spanish.
