= Ricardo López Méndez =

Mexican poet and song lyricist

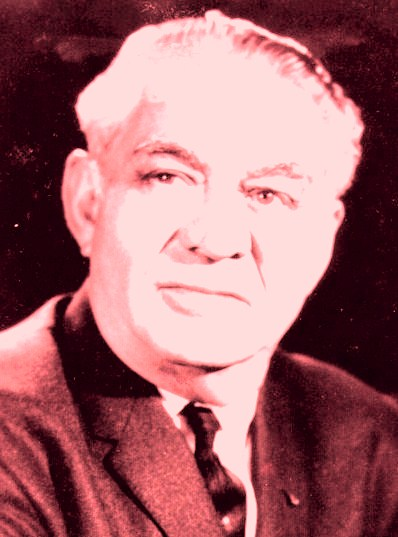
- López Méndez in 1952
- Born: 7 February 1903; Izamal, Yucatán, Mexico
- Died: 28 December 1989 (aged 86); Cuernavaca, Morelos, Mexico

Ricardo López Méndez (Note: In this Hispanic American name, the first or paternal surname is López and the second or maternal family name is Méndez.) (7 February 1903 – 28 December 1989) was a Mexican poet and song lyricist. He was born in Izamal, Yucatán. He became director of the Public Library and an advisor to Felipe Carrillo Puerto, governor of Yucatán from 1922 to 1924. In 1927 he moved to Mexico City as a representative of the government of Yucatán. He was a founder of the radio station XEW (and others across Mexico) and a pioneer of the use of radio to access rural populations. He also became vice president of the Society of Authors and Composers (SACM).

In 2004 his collected poetry and journalism were published as Poesía y Pensamiento. His poem El Credo Mexicano ("Mexican Creed") is a popular patriotic declaration of faith in the country. He also penned the lyrics to the popular song "Amor, Amor, Amor".

López Méndez died in Cuernavaca, Morelos, in 1989. One of his radio stations still bears his initials as its callsign, XHRLM-FM in Ciudad Mante, Tamaulipas.
