= KBZE =

- Berwick, Louisiana; United States
- Frequency: 105.9 MHz
- Branding: 105.9 The Breeze

Programming
- Language: English
- Format: Urban adult contemporary
- Affiliations: Compass Media Networks; Premiere Networks

Ownership
- Owner: Hubcast Broadcasting; (Hubcast Broadcasting, Inc.)

History
- First air date: March 23, 1989
- Former call signs: KVPO (1989–1992)

Technical information
- Licensing authority: FCC
- Facility ID: 40580
- Class: A
- ERP: 4,000 watts
- HAAT: 123 meters (404 ft)
- Transmitter coordinates: 29°45′3.4416″N 91°10′25.4280″W

Links
- Public license information: Public file; LMS
- Webcast: Listen live
- Website: 105.9 The Breeze

KBZE (105.9 MHz, "105.9 The Breeze") is the only urban radio station located between New Orleans and Baton Rouge, and Lafayette. It broadcasts the Steve Harvey Morning Show, and live local news and sports six times a day, weekdays.

Although KBZE's format is urban adult contemporary, the station also broadcasts local programming, including a 15-minute weekday broadcast at 9:30 a.m. by Bishop Hebert Andrew, pastor of the Beacon Light Baptist Church of Houma, weekday contemporary gospel with Pastor Lee Condolle from 9 am to 11 am, and a live two jock lunch hour with DJ Fab and Mike Tyte (Joshua Singleton of Franklin and Michael Turner of New Orleans).

Licensed to Berwick, Louisiana, United States, the station is owned by Hubcast Broadcasting Inc.

The station serves a seven parish region, however, it focuses most of its interest on the Houma/Thibodaux/Morgan City/Franklin metropolitan areas.

Until 2026, the station was simulcast over sister station KFRA 1390 kHz Franklin, Louisiana.

The station also features a webcast of its stream at www.kbze.com. Android and iPhone customers can listen to the station by using the Tune-In Application, a free download.

KBZE is a New Orleans Pelicans affiliate. Ity also broadcasts area high school football, basketball softball and baseball.

== Transmitter ==
As of 2015 the station transmitter is hosted on the KMRC tower in Stephenville, Louisiana.

== History ==
The station was started around 1990, becoming licensed as KVPO in 1991 as a 3,200 watt station at its present tower location. The station changed to its current KBZE calls on October 16, 1992, and was granted an increase of power to 4,000 watts in 1995. The KBZE calls where once used by a radio station licensed to Security, Colorado from 1989 to 1991.
