= XHEMY-FM =

Radio station in Ciudad Mante, Tamaulipas

- Ciudad Mante, Tamaulipas; Mexico
- Frequency: 98.7 FM
- Branding: La Jefa

Programming
- Format: Grupera

Ownership
- Owner: Organización Radiofónica Tamaulipeca; (Radio Tamaulipas, S.A. de C.V.)
- Sister stations: XHECM-FM, XHRLM-FM, XHYP-FM, XHXO-FM

History
- First air date: March 14, 1966 (concession)
- Former frequencies: 840 kHz

Technical information
- Licensing authority: CRT
- Class: B1
- ERP: 25 kW
- HAAT: 30.59 m (100.4 ft)
- Transmitter coordinates: 22°48′54″N 98°56′45″W

Links
- Website: La Jefa 98.7 Website

XHEMY-FM is a radio station in Ciudad Mante, Tamaulipas. It broadcasts on 98.7 FM and airs a grupera format known as La Jefa.

== History ==
XEMY-AM 840 received its concession on March 14, 1966. It was a 500-watt daytimer, later increased to 1,000 watts in the 1990s. It moved to FM in December 2011.
