= XEDF-FM =

Radio station in Mexico City

XEDF-AM and XEDF-FM
Mexico City; Mexico
- Broadcast area: Greater Mexico City
- Frequencies: XEDF-AM: 1500 kHz; XEDF-FM: 104.1 MHz (HD Radio)
- Branding: Radio Fórmula Segunda Cadena

Programming
- Format: Talk radio

Ownership
- Owner: Grupo Fórmula; (La B Grande, S.A. de C.V.)
- Sister stations: XEAI-AM, XERFR-AM/XERFR-FM

History
- First air date: XEDF-AM: 1970s; XEDF-FM: 1984; AM: 1970s; FM: 1984
- Former call signs: XEDF-AM: XERH-AM (1970s–1980s); XEAI-AM (1980s–2000)
- Call sign meaning: "Distrito Federal", former name for Mexico City

Technical information
- Licensing authority: CRT
- Class: XEDF-AM: B; XEDF-FM: C1; AM: B; FM: C1
- Power: XEDF-AM: 50,000 watts (days only)
- ERP: XEDF-FM: 58,138 watts
- HAAT: XEDF-FM: 476 meters (1,562 ft)
- Transmitter coordinates: XEDF-AM: 19°22′47.3″N 99°06′09.2″W; XEDF-FM: 19°26′01.4″N 99°08′27.2″W

Links
- Webcast: AM: Listen live; FM: Listen live
- Website: radioformula.com.mx

XEDF-AM (1500 AM) and XEDF-FM (104.1 FM) are commercial radio stations in Mexico City, owned by Grupo Fórmula. They are the flagship stations of Radio Fórmula's "Segunda Cadena" (Second Network), simulcasting a talk radio format.

By day, XEDF-AM is powered at 50,000 watts. But 1500 AM is a United States clear-channel frequency. So to avoid interference, XEDF-AM is a daytimer station and must go off the air at night. The AM transmitter is off Avenida Rio Churubusco, next to the Zentralia Churubusco Shopping Centre, in the southeast section of Mexico City.

XEDF-FM is a Class C station with an effective radiated power (ERP) of 58,138 watts. The FM transmitter is atop Torre Latinoamericana. XEDF-FM broadcasts using HD Radio technology, carrying several subchannels, including a one-hour timeshift feed of XEDF-FM, the 1500 AM feed, and a jazz music format known as "Jazz FM."

== Programming ==
Grupo Fórmula owns several talk stations in Mexico City. The primary stations are XERFR-FM 103.3 and XERFR-AM 970, airing the "Radio Fórmula" network. XEDF-AM-FM carry the secondary talk radio network, "Segundo Cadena."

The Segunda Cadena has its own schedule of personalities. They include Ciro Gómez Leyva, Manuel Feregrino, Enrique Acevedo, Javier Risco, Jaime Núñez, Juan Becerra Acosta, Leonardo Curzio, Michelle Rivera and Juan Pablo Pérez Díaz. There are entertainment shows with Marco Antonio Regil, Flor Rubio and Mariana Braun; sports shows with Heriberto Murrieta and a car radio show with Arturo Rivera.

== History ==
=== XEDF-AM ===
1500 AM began its life in the 1970s. Its original call sign was XERH-AM. It called itself "La Tropical Grande de México" with tropical music. In the 1980s, it became XEAI-AM (call letters now on 1470 AM). It adopted several formats, such as tropical music and general music. In 1998, the oldies "Vida" format at 1470 AM, then known as XESM-AM, was moved to 1500.

It was not until 2000 that 1500 AM was renamed XEDF-AM. It became a news/talk station as part of Radio Fórmula's second national talk network, "Segunda Cadena."

=== XEDF-FM ===
The station signed on the air in 1984. It was known as "Jazz FM", a station remembered as a milestone in the history of jazz in Mexico. Despite praise for a format not otherwise available on Mexican radio, the ratings were not sustainable.

In 1992, XEDF-FM became tropical-formatted Radio Uno, attempting to compete with XEQ-FM 92.9 "Tropi-Q" and XHFO-FM 92.1 "La Z". During this era Radio Uno was considered an important station in the promotion of new subgenres of cumbia as well as grupera music. After eight years, management decided to end music on the station.

In 2000, XEDF-FM became the keystone of Radio Fórmula's Segunda Cadena (or Cadena Radio Uno, as it was known for a time). It began broadcasting a news and talk format different from the original Radio Fórmula feed.
