= XHXO-FM =

Radio station in Ciudad Mante, Tamaulipas

- Ciudad Mante, Tamaulipas; Mexico
- Frequency: 95.7 FM
- RDS: LA SUPER BUENA 95.7 FM - XHXO
- Branding: La Súper Buena

Programming
- Format: Regional Mexican

Ownership
- Owner: Organización Radiofónica Tamaulipeca; (Sistema Radiofónico de Tamaulipas, S.A. de C.V.)
- Sister stations: XHECM-FM, XHRLM-FM, XHYP-FM, XHEMY-FM

History
- First air date: December 14, 1972 (concession)

Technical information
- Licensing authority: CRT
- Class: B1
- ERP: 25,000 watts
- HAAT: 23.31 m (76.5 ft)
- Transmitter coordinates: 22°42′49″N 98°58′49″W

Links
- Website: La Super Buena website

XHXO-FM is a radio station on 95.7 FM in Ciudad Mante, Tamaulipas. It is owned by Organización Radiofónica Tamaulipeca and is known as La Súper Buena and carries a Regional Mexican format.

== History ==
XEXO-AM 1390 received its concession in December 1972. It was owned by Jorge Cárdenas González and broadcast with 5,000 watts during the day and 100 at night, which later increased to 500. It was transferred to the current concessionaire in 1990 and approved to migrate to FM in December 2011.

Previous logo
