= XHYP-FM =

Radio station in Ciudad Mante, Tamaulipas

- El Limón–Ciudad Mante, Tamaulipas; Mexico
- Frequency: 93.9 MHz
- Branding: La Chabela

Programming
- Format: Regional Mexican

Ownership
- Owner: Organizacion Radiofónica Tamaulipeca; (Radiodifusora del Sur, S.A. de C.V.)
- Sister stations: XHECM-FM, XHRLM-FM, XHXO-FM, XHEMY-FM

History
- First air date: November 26, 1969 (concession)

Technical information
- Licensing authority: CRT
- Class: B1
- ERP: 25 kW
- HAAT: 22.96 m
- Transmitter coordinates: 22°50′00″N 99°00′00″W

Links
- Website: La Chabela 93.9 Website

XHYP-FM is a radio station in Ciudad Mante, Tamaulipas. It broadcasts on 93.9 FM from a transmitter in the neighboring municipality of El Limón and carries a Regional Mexican format known as La Chabela.

== History ==
XEYP-AM 1520 was awarded to Enrique Cárdenas González in 1964 and received its concession five years later. It was cleared to migrate to FM in December 2011.

In January 2017, XHYP flipped from Imagen Radio to Di 93.9, an English-language classic hits format. The branding and format were changed again in July 2020 when XHYP adopted name La Chabela with a classic regional mexican format.
