= KXSL =

Coordinates: 34°12′40″N 110°00′20″W

- Show Low, Arizona; United States
- Broadcast area: White Mountains (Arizona)
- Frequency: 1470 kHz
- Branding: K-Bear 100.5

Programming
- Format: Country
- Affiliations: Westwood One, Fox News Radio

Ownership
- Owner: Karen Barbee and Vance Barbee; (New Star Broadcasting LLC)

History
- First air date: 1968 (at 1450)
- Former call signs: KVSL (1968–2020)
- Former frequencies: 1450 kHz (1968–2014)

Technical information
- Licensing authority: FCC
- Facility ID: 33693
- Class: D
- Power: 5,000 watts day 87 watts night
- Translator: 100.5 K263CA (Taylor)

Links
- Public license information: Public file; LMS

KXSL is a commercial music radio station in Show Low, Arizona, broadcasting on 1470 AM. It is owned by Karen Barbee and Vance Barbee, through licensee New Star Broadcasting LLC.
