= Azucena Uresti =

Mexican journalist and news anchor

Azucena Uresti Mireles
- Born: 15 March 1978 (age 47); Monterrey, México
- Occupations: journalist and news anchor

Azucena Uresti is a Mexican news anchor and journalist. She works as a news anchor for Milenio Television and Radio Fórmula. She is regarded as a prominent television anchor in Mexico.

== Biography ==
In August 2021, she received death threats in a video sent by Nemesio Oseguera Cervantes, a man who claimed to be the leader of the Mexican drug cartel. She and other various media news outlets were threatened by him for delivering news coverage about Mexican drug cartels.

Despite the threats, she continued her work at Milenio TV and revealed that she would enter into the federal protection program after receiving threats. Mexican president Andrés Manuel López Obrador defended her and condemned the threats levelled against her.
