= XHRPO-FM =

Radio station in Oaxaca, Oaxaca, Mexico

- Santa Cruz Amilpas, Oaxaca, Mexico; Mexico
- Broadcast area: Santa Cruz Amilpas, Oaxaca
- Frequency: 97.7 MHz
- Branding: El Heraldo Radio

Programming
- Format: News / Talk

Ownership
- Owner: El Heraldo de México; (R.R. Televisión y Valores para la Innovación, S.A. de C.V.)

History
- First air date: March 14, 1963 (concession)
- Former call signs: XERPO-AM
- Former frequencies: 710 kHz

Technical information
- ERP: 25 kW
- HAAT: -30.95 meters
- Transmitter coordinates: 17°04′11″N 96°43′56″W

Links
- Webcast: Listen live
- Website: heraldodemexico.com.mx

XHRPO-FM is a Mexicoan radio station on 97.7 FM in Santa Cruz Amilpas, Oaxaca, serving the capital city of Oaxaca de Juárez. It is owned and operated by El Heraldo de México and carries its El Heraldo Radio news format.

== History ==
XHRPO received its concession in 1963 as XERPO-AM 710. It was owned by Horacio Niño Medina and later by Sistema de Radiodifusión del Sureste, S.A.

Logo used with the La Z format

It was sold to Grupo Radio México in 1994. On April 30, 2021, La Z ceased broadcasting after Grupo Radio Centro, Grupo Radio México's successor, reached a deal to sell XHRPO-FM to El Heraldo de México.
