= KBEC =

Radio station in Waxahachie, Texas

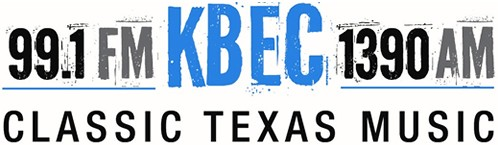
- Waxahachie, Texas; United States
- Broadcast area: Ellis County
- Frequency: 1390 kHz
- Branding: Hometown Radio KBEC

Programming
- Format: Classic Texas Country
- Affiliations: Texas State Network

Ownership
- Owner: Jon Garrett

History
- First air date: 1955
- Former call signs: KELL (1949–1951); KWHA (1952–1953) (These stations never went on the air)
- Call sign meaning: Keep Building Ellis County

Technical information
- Licensing authority: FCC
- Class: 1390: B 99.1: D
- Power: 1390: 480 watts day 260 watts night
- ERP: 99.1: 250 watts
- HAAT: 99.1: 45 meters
- Transmitter coordinates: 1390: 32°25′30″N 96°51′56″W; 99.1: 32°26′48.50″N 96°48′16″W
- Translator: 99.1 K256DE (Waxahachie)

Links
- Public license information: Public file; LMS
- Webcast: Listen Live
- Website: kbec.com

KBEC (1390 AM) is a commercial radio station licensed to Waxahachie, Texas and serving Ellis County. It is owned by Jon and Alyssa Garrett and it carries a classic country/Texas country radio format with some talk and sports shows.

Programming is also heard on 250-watt FM translator K256DE at 99.1 MHz in Waxahachie.

== History ==
KBEC has the distinction of being the longest family-owned station in Texas. It has been family-owned since 1955 when it was founded by Faye and Richard Tuck. The Tuck family came to Waxahachie in 1952 to pursue their dream of purchasing a radio station.

KBEC was the third attempt to build a station on 1390 AM in Ellis County. The first was KELL, owned by the Ellis County Broadcasting Company, which received a construction permit in 1949. In early 1950, the Federal Communications Commission denied an extension of its permit because the owners had indicated they wanted to build the station and sell it immediately. In 1952, Cen-Tex Broadcasting received a construction permit for KWHA, which never came to air.

Ellis County Broadcasting Service, owned by W. Richard Tuck, James B. Branch, and Roy M. Fish, received the construction permit for KBEC in September 1954 and signed the station on in 1955 (with Tuck buying out the remaining partners in 1956). An adult standards format was in place from 1955 to 1978. The station then switched to a short-lived Spanish language Regional Mexican format, reverting to adult standards music again. In 1988, KBEC changed to classic country music. In 2011, the format began emphasizing more Texas artists and adopted the programming theme of "Made in Texas, Played in Texas, and Born in Texas".

The station was purchased in July 2011 by Jim and Ann Eklund Phillips' company, Troubadour Communications, from Jeanne Mosley and Sandra Howell. This was a private stock transfer of assets including the station's studios and office building, 13.98 acres of land housing the station towers and transmitter, as well as personal property and building contents. All key personnel, including general manager Ken Roberts, Barry Wolverton, and then-DJ Jon Garrett were retained.

In March 2022, KBEC was sold to Jon and Alyssa Garrett. Garrett started his radio career at the station in 2010. As an all-cash sale, Garrett retained all common stock, the office building at 711 Ferris Avenue, and the 13.98-acre tower site from Troubadour Communications for $1.05 million. Roberts, Wolverton, and other key staff were again retained.

In July 2022, Garrett purchased the Texas Theater in downtown Waxahachie. The theater, which had been abandoned for over a decade, was reopened on April 1, 2023, with a concert by Brandon Rhyder.

On May 18, 2023, KBEC began broadcasting a live music show, titled "Lone Star Nights," from the Texas every Thursday evening. Later that year, the station changed its branding to "Hometown Radio" while retaining its format.
