= XHAV-FM =

Radio station in Guadalajara, Jalisco

- Guadalajara; Mexico
- Frequency: 100.3 MHz
- Branding: Heraldo Radio

Programming
- Format: News / Talk

Ownership
- Owner: El Heraldo de México; (GA Radiocomunicaciones, S.A. de C.V.)

History
- First air date: 1958 (as XEAV-FM)
- Former call signs: XEAV-FM (1958–1970s)
- Call sign meaning: Modification of former callsign, XEAV-FM: Alfredo Vázquez Tello

Technical information
- Licensing authority: CRT
- Class: C1
- ERP: 97.09 kW
- HAAT: 84.25 meters (276.4 ft)
- Transmitter coordinates: 20°40′23.87″N 103°22′24.16″W

Links
- Webcast: Listen live
- Website: heraldodemexico.com.mx

XHAV-FM is a radio station on 100.3 FM in Guadalajara. The station is owned by El Heraldo de México newspaper as Heraldo Radio, a news/talk station.

== History ==
XEAV-FM 100.3 received its concession on November 25, 1963, but it had been operating since at least February 1958, making it the first FM radio station in Jalisco. It was an FM simulcast of XEAV-AM 580 "Radio Guadalajara". Between 1970 and 1976, XEAV-FM became XHAV-FM, a separately programmed station. The 1980s saw the station turn its focus to a younger audience with rock music; known as "Super Stereo", the station was considered a launching pad for radio personalities in Guadalajara.

In 2004, XHAV was sold by Núcleo Radio Guadalajara to Grupo Imagen, and on January 30, 2006, Super Stereo, which had seen its ratings wane over time, was relaunched as a new radio format from Imagen, known as RMX. RMX was designed to appeal to a young audience (18-30). Meanwhile, it proved enough of a success in Guadalajara that Imagen expanded the format to other cities: Torreón, Querétaro, Celaya, Nuevo Laredo and Cancún all received RMX stations between 2007 and 2011. The national RMX system was unusually decentralized, and each RMX station originated programming for the network. In 2017, RMX went full-time on XHDL-FM Mexico City.

In 2010, RMX began the 212 annual concert in Guadalajara, now among western Mexico's largest musical events.

=== Sale to El Heraldo de México ===
On June 16, 2019, Grupo Imagen and Grupo Andrade, owners of the El Heraldo de México newspaper, announced that they had reached a strategic agreement under which Imagen would sell XHDL-FM and XHAV-FM to the newspaper, subject to the approval of the IFT.

RMX closed down at 11:59pm on Friday, June 21, to allow El Heraldo to begin operation of the station as Heraldo Radio on June 22. The station remains a full-time simulcast of XHDL-FM. The transfer of the concessions of XHDL and XHAV to GA Radiocomunicaciones, S.A. de C.V., a subsidiary of Grupo Andrade, was approved by the IFT on August 28, 2019.
