= XEBAL-AM =

Radio station in Bécal, Campeche

Currently silent
- Bécal, Campeche; Mexico
- Broadcast area: Campeche
- Frequency: 1470 AM
- Branding: 1470 AM

Programming
- Format: Silent

Ownership
- Owner: Cadena Cultural Becaleña, A.C.

History
- First air date: March 4, 1980
- Call sign meaning: "Bécal"

Technical information
- Class: B
- Power: 2.5 kW day 500 watts night
- Transmitter coordinates: 20°25′37″N 90°01′48.5″W

Links
- Webcast: Listen live
- Website: xeba1470.com

XEBAL-AM is a radio station in Bécal, Campeche, Mexico. It broadcasts on 1470 AM and It is currently silent.

== History ==
The idea of forming a radio station in Bécal first came forth in the 1960s, led by Josué and Azael Uc Canul. However, the government demanded more legal requirements than they could supply at the time. In 1977, Cadena Cultural Becaleña, A.C., was formed. In 1978, it obtained a permit; the next year, the station bought a 1 kW transmitter from Pennsylvania in the United States.

On March 4, 1980, XEBAL-AM 1470 took to the air, becoming the first radio station in the municipality of Calkiní. It initially operated from 6am to 6pm with instrumental and classical music and cultural programming. 1992 saw a new 2.5 kW transmitter being placed into service.

In 2000, the station expanded its facilities and began programming from 6 a.m. to midnight each day. Programming includes Christian evangelism, baseball and cultural and social programming. It later changed to a daytime schedule of 6 a.m. to 6 p.m.; sometimes, the broadcast is suspended due to heavy rain or storms.

In October 2024, XEBAL began broadcasting online again and expanded its broadcast day to run from 6:00 a.m. to 10:00 p.m. In January 2025, it returned to broadcasting from 6:00 a.m. to 6:00 p.m., and in March, it went from 6:00 a.m. to 2:00 p.m. The station is currently off the air since June 30, 2025 due to expiration.
