= Ciudad Mante National Airport =

Airfield in Ciudad Mante, Tamaulipas, Mexico

Ciudad Mante National Airport Aeropuerto Nacional de Ciudad Mante
- IATA: MMC; ICAO: MMDM; LID: CDM

Summary
- Airport type: Public
- Serves: Ciudad Mante, Tamaulipas, Mexico
- Time zone: CST (UTC-06:00)
- Elevation AMSL: 104 m (341 ft)
- Coordinates: 22°44′25″N 099°01′05″W

Map
- Location of airport in Tamaulipas MMC (Mexico)

Runways
Direction	Length		Surface
Direction	m	ft	Surface
08/36	2,000	6,562	Asphalt

Statistics (2025)
- Bassed aircraft: 1
- Source: Agencia Federal de Aviación Civil; Registro Aeronáutico Mexicano

Ciudad Mante Airfield (IATA: MMC, ICAO: MMDM) (Spanish: Aeropuerto Nacional de Ciudad Mante) is a small airstrip located in Ciudad Mante, Tamaulipas, Mexico. It handles domestic air traffic and supports flight training and general aviation activities. The airfield does not provide scheduled passenger public services. The nearest airport that serves commercial flights is Tampico International Airport.

Situated at an elevation of 104 metres (341 ft) above mean sea level, it features a single asphalt runway, designated as 08/36, measuring 2,000 by 17 metres (6,562 by 56 ft). Adjacent facilities include small hangars and unpaved parking positions for aircraft. Over the years, the airfield has experienced intermittent service by regional airlines, offering seasonal flights within the region.

== See also ==
- List of the busiest airports in Mexico
- List of airports in Mexico
- List of airports by ICAO code: M
- List of busiest airports in North America
- List of the busiest airports in Latin America
- Transportation in Mexico
- Tourism in Mexico
- Tampico International Airport
