= WXAG =

Athens, Georgia; United States
- Frequency: 1470 kHz
- Branding: The Heart & Soul of Athens Ga

Programming
- Format: Urban adult contemporary
- Affiliations: Premiere Networks; Westwood One

Ownership
- Owner: Mecca Communications, Inc.

History
- First air date: November 21, 1979 (as WCCD)
- Former call signs: WCCD (1979–1982)

Technical information
- Licensing authority: FCC
- Facility ID: 40974
- Class: D
- Power: 1,000 watts day
- Transmitter coordinates: 33°59′14.00″N 83°20′17.00″W
- Translator: 92.7 W224CY (Athens)

Links
- Public license information: Public file; LMS
- Website: wxagathens.com

WXAG (1470 AM) is a radio station broadcasting an urban adult contemporary format. Licensed to Athens, Georgia, United States, the station is currently owned by Mecca Communications, Inc.

== History ==
The station went on the air as WCCD on 1979-11-21. on 1982-10-26, the station changed its call sign to the current WXAG.
