= WMCT =

- Mountain City, Tennessee; United States
- Frequencies: 1390 kHz & 102.9 FM translator

Programming
- Format: Classic Country

Ownership
- Owner: Johnson County Broadcasting, Inc.

History
- First air date: December 8, 1967
- Call sign meaning: Mountain City, Tennessee

Technical information
- Licensing authority: FCC
- Facility ID: 31887
- Class: D
- Power: 1,000 watts day 58 watts night FM 250 watts
- Transmitter coordinates: 36°29′23″N 81°47′12″W

Links
- Public license information: Public file; LMS
- Website: wmctradio.net

WMCT (1390 AM) is a radio station licensed to serve Mountain City, Tennessee, United States. The station is owned by Johnson County Broadcasting, Inc.

WMCT broadcasts a classic country music format. The station was assigned the WMCT call sign by the Federal Communications Commission.
