= XHDL-FM =

Radio station in Mexico City

- Mexico City; Mexico
- Broadcast area: Greater Mexico City
- Frequency: 98.5 MHz (HD Radio)
- Branding: El Heraldo Radio

Programming
- Format: News/talk; contemporary music in English
- Subchannels: HD2: El Heraldo Radio HD2

Ownership
- Owner: El Heraldo de México; (GA Radiocomunicaciones, S.A. de C.V.)

History
- First air date: May 19, 1962 (concession)
- Former call signs: XELA-FM (1962–89)
- Call sign meaning: "Dial FM" (former name)

Technical information
- Licensing authority: CRT
- Class: C
- ERP: 100 kW
- HAAT: 460.5 meters (1,511 ft)
- Transmitter coordinates: 19°32′02″N 99°07′46″W

Links
- Webcast: Listen live
- Website: heraldodemexico.com.mx

XHDL-FM is a radio station on 98.5 FM in Mexico City. XHDL is owned by El Heraldo de México and operates as a news/talk station known as El Heraldo Radio. The transmitter site is located atop Cerro del Chiquihuite.

XHDL-FM broadcasts in HD.

== History ==
98.5 FM began as XELA-FM in 1962, owned by Radio Metropolitana, S.A., the concessionaire of XELA-AM 830. Until 1984, it was an FM simulcast of 830 AM; when it broke away, it became "Stereo Classics", English-language music of the 1950s, 1960s and 1970s. In 1989, the format was changed to more contemporary music in English as "Dial FM", and the callsign was changed to XHDL-FM to reference the new format.

=== Radioactivo era ===
On July 20, 1992, XHDL became "Radioactivo 98.5", with a rock and hip hop format. Its first slogan, "Radioactivity's in the air", was quickly eclipsed by its second: "Fuck everyone else". Various international artists, such as Metallica, Rammstein, The Mars Volta, Fabolous, Snoop Dogg and the Red Hot Chili Peppers, visited the station. From 1992 to 2000, MVS Radio, the joint venture between Frecuencia Modulada Mexicana and Grupo Imagen, operated the station; in 2000, XHDL-FM, XEDA-FM 90.5 and XELA-AM broke off to become the stations of Imagen Telecomunicaciones. Under Imagen, Radioactivo went through various changes, the largest of which was the departure of José Alvarez in 2003. The station closed on 2 April 2004 causing some minor protests outside the studios.

=== Reporte 98.5 ===
With presidential elections looming in 2006, several stations flipped to talk formats, including XHDL, which did so in April 2004 under the name Reporte 98.5. Many of the personalities from Radioactivo 98.5 eventually migrated to IMER's XHOF-FM, such as Rulo, El Sopitas, Julio Martínez and Erich Martino. Reporte offered news, talk and traffic reports aimed at the Mexico City area, including three full newscasts a day, sports and financial programming.

=== RMX ===
Logo as RMX used between 2017 and 2019

XHDL-FM began operating in HD Radio in 2011 alongside XEDA-FM, making them the first radio stations in Mexico City to do so. At that time, XEDA-HD2 was activated carrying the audio of RMX Guadalajara (XHAV-FM). On January 5, 2017, Imagen Radio announced that XHDL would go full-time with the RMX format, beginning Monday, January 9, alongside one new affiliate, XHOD-FM in San Luis Potosí, as well as two existing Imagen/RMX combo stations, XHQOO-FM in Cancún and XHMIG-FM San Miguel de Allende-Celaya.

=== Sale to El Heraldo de México ===
On June 16, 2019, Grupo Imagen and Grupo Andrade, owners of the El Heraldo de México newspaper, announced that they had reached a strategic agreement under which Imagen would sell XHDL-FM and XHAV-FM to the newspaper, subject to the approval of the IFT.

RMX closed down at 11:59pm on Friday, June 21, to allow El Heraldo to begin operation of the station as Heraldo Radio on June 22. The new programming began on June 25, with longform newscasts and other informative programs, while still carrying music programming similar to RMX's on overnights and weekends. The transfer of the concessions of XHDL and XHAV to GA Radiocomunicaciones, S.A. de C.V., a subsidiary of Grupo Andrade, was approved by the IFT on August 28, 2019.

Heraldo Radio news hosts include Sergio Sarmiento, Guadalupe Juárez, Jesús Martín Mendoza and Salvador García Soto.
