= XHRPV-FM =

Radio station in Ciudad Victoria, Tamaulipas

- Benito Juárez–Ciudad Victoria, Tamaulipas; Mexico
- Broadcast area: Ciudad Victoria
- Frequency: 104.1 FM
- Branding: La V de Victoria

Programming
- Format: Spanish adult hits

Ownership
- Owner: Organización Radiofónica Tamaulipeca; (Radio Televisora de Ciudad Victoria, S.A. de C.V.)
- Sister stations: XHBJ-FM, XHHP-FM, XHGW-FM, XHVIR-FM

History
- First air date: April 5, 1971 (concession)
- Former call signs: XERPV-AM
- Former frequencies: 1340 kHz

Technical information
- Licensing authority: CRT
- Class: B1
- ERP: 14,750 watts
- HAAT: −32.91 m (−108.0 ft)
- Transmitter coordinates: 23°47′47.7″N 99°07′56.2″W

Links
- Website: ort.com.mx

XHRPV-FM is a radio station on 104.1 FM in Ciudad Victoria, Tamaulipas.

== History ==
XERPV-AM 1340 received its concession on April 5, 1971. The 1,000-watt station was cleared to move to FM at the end of 2011.
