= XHRW-FM =

Radio station in Tampico, Tamaulipas, Mexico

- Tampico, Tamaulipas; Mexico
- Frequency: 97.7 FM
- RDS: LOS 40
- Branding: Los 40

Programming
- Format: Contemporary hit radio
- Affiliations: Radiópolis

Ownership
- Owner: Grupo AS Comunicación; (XHRW FM-Tampico, S.A. de C.V.)
- Sister stations: XHMU-FM, XHAR-FM, XHETO-FM, XHS-FM, XHHF-FM, XHRRT-FM, XHERP-FM

History
- First air date: 1975
- Former frequencies: 99.3 MHz (1974–1990)
- Call sign meaning: Raúl Amor Wertt (original concessionaire)

Technical information
- Licensing authority: CRT
- Class: B
- ERP: 23,000 watts
- HAAT: 71.1 m (233 ft)
- Transmitter coordinates: 22°11′43″N 97°50′07″W

Links
- Webcast: Listen live
- Website: Grupo AS

XHRW-FM is a radio station on 97.7 FM in Tampico, Tamaulipas, Mexico. It is owned by Grupo AS Comunicación and carries the Los 40 pop format from Radiópolis.

== History ==
Raul Wertt received the concession for XHRW-FM in 1974 and put the station on the air in the second FM radio station in Tampico into 1975. The original concession specified operation on 99.3 MHz (later used by XHETU-FM) with an ERP of three kilowatts. The station was known as Stereo 99 with a pop format before became Estéreo Ritmo in 1982. In 1990, the station moved to 97.7 MHz, rebranding as Super Stereo 98 in 1997. In 2001, the station changed its name, continuing in the pop format, to Arroba 97.7. In 2005, the Los 40 Principales format that had been broadcast on XHHF-FM 96.9 moved to XHRW-FM.
