= XEEW-AM =

Radio station in Matamoros, Tamaulipas, Mexico

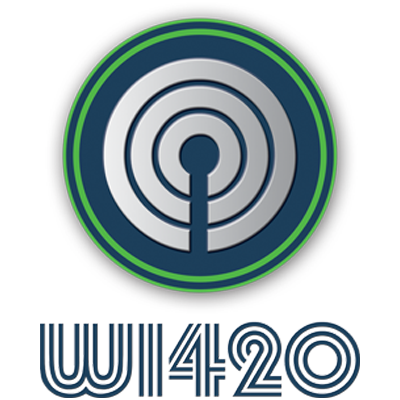
- Matamoros, Tamaulipas; Mexico
- Broadcast area: Brownsville–Matamoros
- Frequency: 1420 AM
- Branding: W1420

Programming
- Format: Talk radio Spanish Oldies
- Affiliations: Radio Fórmula

Ownership
- Owner: RadioDual, S.A. de C.V.; (Jorge Cárdenas Dávila)
- Sister stations: XEEW-FM

History
- First air date: 1954

Technical information
- Licensing authority: CRT
- Class: C
- Power: 1 kW
- Transmitter coordinates: 25°51′52.4″N 97°28′14.6″W

Links
- Webcast: Listen live
- Website: w1420.com

XEEW-AM is a radio station in Matamoros, Tamaulipas, Mexico, operated by RadioDual. It is known as W1420 and carries a talk radio and spanish oldies format.

== History ==
The station received its concession on August 31, 1954.
