= XEFD-AM =

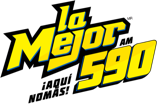
- Río Bravo, Tamaulipas; Mexico
- Broadcast area: McAllen–Reynosa
- Frequency: 590 kHz
- Branding: La Mejor

Programming
- Format: Regional Mexican
- Affiliations: MVS Radio

Ownership
- Owner: Grupo Gape Radio; (Corporadio Gape de Tamaulipas, S.A. de C.V.)
- Sister stations: XHO-FM, XHEOQ-FM, XEOR-AM

History
- First air date: May 11, 1953

Technical information
- Licensing authority: CRT
- Class: B
- Power: 5,000 watts day 500 watts night

Links
- Website: lamejor.com.mx/reynosa

XEFD-AM (590 kHz) is a Regional Mexican radio station in Río Bravo that serves the McAllen, Texas (USA) / Reynosa, Tamaulipas (Mexico) border area.

== History ==
XEFD received its concession on May 11, 1953. It was owned by José María Villarreal Montemayor. The station was sold to the current concessionaire in 1981 and doubled its nighttime power in 1990.
