= XHERP-FM =

Radio station in Tampico, Tamaulipas, Mexico

- Tampico, Tamaulipas; Mexico
- Frequency: 104.7 FM
- RDS: 104.7 Mhz BOOM BOOM CLASSIC
- Branding: Boom FM

Programming
- Format: Classic hits radio of the 80's, 90's and 2000's

Ownership
- Owner: Grupo AS; (Radiodifusión Huasteca, S.A.)
- Sister stations: XHS-FM, XHHF-FM, XHRRT-FM, XHRW-FM, XHETO-FM, XHAR-FM, XHMU-FM

History
- First air date: November 10, 1958 (concession)
- Former call signs: XERP-AM
- Former frequencies: 1330 kHz

Technical information
- Licensing authority: CRT
- Class: B1
- ERP: 25,000 watts
- HAAT: 101.8 m (334 ft)
- Transmitter coordinates: 22°12′44″N 97°49′47″W

Links
- Webcast: Listen live
- Website: grupoasradio.com

XHERP-FM (branded as Boom FM) is a Spanish-language radio station that serves the Tampico, Tamaulipas, Mexico market area broadcasting on 104.7 FM.

== History ==
XERP-AM 1330 received its concession on November 10, 1958. The station broadcast from Ciudad Madero and was owned by Juan Gualberto Guerra Luna. His estate owned XERP/XHERP until 2013. It broadcast grupera music as a local station called La Tremenda and then repeated W Radio before the transition to Boom FM into adopted the name into the 2014.
