= KFRA =

Former simulcast of KBZE
- Franklin, Louisiana; United States
- Frequency: 1390 kHz
- Branding: 105.9 The Breeze

Programming
- Format: Urban adult contemporary

Ownership
- Owner: Castay Media, Inc.
- Sister stations: KBZE

History
- First air date: 1961
- Last air date: 2026
- Call sign meaning: Franklin

Technical information
- Facility ID: 22307
- Class: B
- Power: 500 watts daytime; 244 watts nighttime
- Transmitter coordinates: 29°50′14″N 91°32′22″W

Links
- Website: www.kfra1390am.com

KFRA (1390 AM) was a 500 watt daytime and 244 watt nighttime non-directional radio station in Franklin, Louisiana, that relayed most of radio station KBZE.

KFRA's first license was issued on August 25, 1961. The Federal Communications Commission cancelled the station's license on June 10, 2026.
