= XHRT-FM =

Radio station in Reynosa, Tamaulipas, Mexico

- Reynosa, Tamaulipas; Mexico
- Broadcast area: McAllen–Reynosa
- Frequency: 95.3 MHz
- Branding: @FM (Arroba FM)

Programming
- Format: Contemporary hit radio

Ownership
- Owner: Grupo Radiorama; (XHRT-FM Reynosa, S.A. de C.V.)
- Sister stations: XERT-AM, XHRKS-FM

History
- First air date: November 28, 1988 (concession)
- Call sign meaning: Reynosa, Tamaulipas

Technical information
- Licensing authority: CRT
- Class: AA
- ERP: 6,000 watts
- HAAT: 44.6 meters (146 ft)
- Transmitter coordinates: 26°04′48.6″N 98°16′30.2″W

Links
- Website: arroba.fm/reynosa

XHRT-FM (95.3 MHz) is a radio station in Reynosa, Tamaulipas, Mexico.

== History ==
XHRT received its concession on November 28, 1988. It is ways been owned by Radiorama; carrying a Spanish contemporary format as Estéreo Vida.

In the 2000s, the station became a pop format known as Xtrema. After nearly two decades, in November 2022, the Xtrema brand (XHRT being the last station to use the format) was retired and leased to Grupo Radio Avanzado along with the sister station XERT-AM; XHRT became Power 95.3, playing a Spanish urban format. On July 3, 2023, Radiorama reassumed operations of XHRT, with the station adopting the @FM (Arroba FM) contemporary hit radio brand.
