= XERFR-FM =

Radio station in Mexico City

XERFR-AM/XERFR-FM
- Mexico City; Mexico
- Broadcast area: Greater Mexico City
- Frequencies: 970 kHz; 103.3 MHz (HD Radio)
- Branding: Radio Fórmula (1ra Cadena)

Programming
- Format: News radio

Ownership
- Owner: Grupo Fórmula; (La B Grande, S.A. de C.V.)
- Sister stations: XEDF-AM/XEDF-FM, XEAI-AM

History
- First air date: 1932/1957
- Former call signs: AM: XEK-AM (1932–1957), XEDF-AM (1957–1997); FM: XERPM-FM (1957–1999)
- Call sign meaning: "Radio Fórmula"

Technical information
- Licensing authority: CRT
- Class: B (AM); C1 (FM)
- Power: (AM) 50,000 watts (day); 4,000 watts (night)
- ERP: (FM) 58.13 kW
- HAAT: 476 meters (1,562 ft) (FM)
- Transmitter coordinates: 19°22′47.3″N 99°06′09.2″W (AM) 19°26′01.4″N 99°08′27.2″W (FM)

Links
- Webcast: Listen live
- Website: radioformula.com.mx

XERFR-AM 970/XERFR-FM 103.3 is a radio station in Mexico City. It is the flagship of Radio Fórmula's Primera Cadena. The FM transmitter site is located atop Torre Latinoamericana, its AM transmitter is located next to Zentralia Churubusco shopping centre Southeast of Mexico City.

XERFR-FM broadcasts in HD and used to carry four subchannels, including a one-hour timeshift feed of XERFR-FM, the feed of 1470 XEAI-AM, and Radio Fórmula's Trión musical format. but the station currently uses only one digital channel carrying XERFR-FM programming.

== History ==
=== AM ===
The history of XERFR-AM begins with the concession for XEK-AM, originally on 990 kHz, awarded to Gen. Miguel M. Acosta on November 24, 1932. On October 22, 1957, XEK-AM shipped its callsign to Nuevo Laredo, where it was picked up by 960 AM, then XEDF-AM. The XEDF-AM callsign, which would have been sequentially assigned, thus was brought to Mexico City.

In 1964, the name of the concessionaire became Radio Distrito Federal, a name also adopted by the station on-air in 1968. Grupo Radio Fórmula traces its beginnings to 1968, when Rogerio Azcárraga Madero bought the station from Emilio Azcárraga's Radiópolis system to form what was then known as Grupo ORO. At this time 970 AM carried a rock music format. The goal was to introduce rock 'n' roll music to Mexico; it did not hurt that the station was co-owned with the Orfeón record label.

The 1980s saw Rogerio Azcárraga Madero lead an overhaul of Radio Fórmula. The stations switched from music to talk formats, while new and renowned personalities were brought in to host programming. On XEDF, this meant a whole new format: DF Noticias 970, an all-news station, and from 1989 more women's programming with hosts such as Maxine Woodside was introduced. The 1990s were the decade of Radio Fórmula's expansion across Mexico, which increased the group's national reach and influence.

970 AM became XERFR-AM in 1997; XEDF-AM is now the callsign on 1500, formerly XERH-AM.

=== FM ===
103.3 FM got its start as XERPM-FM, a station owned by Radio Programas de México and put on air in 1957. The initial programming on XERPM was music, mainly of the rock 'n' roll variety, and by 1976 had been turned into a classical music station, but in 1978, after its acquisition by Grupo Radio Fórmula, XERPM became Disco Radio FM with a disco format.

The station went through various format changes. In 1983, it became Cosmo Estéreo 103, with more techno-pop and electro-pop music. In 1989, after the departure of Romeo Herrera, the station became Kosmo 103, with a pop and rock format in English. However, the station was not competitive in the ratings to a then-strong XEW-FM or to XHFAJ-FM, both with similar formats, prompting another format change.

"Fórmula Romántica", an oldies music format, took Kosmo's place in 1991, billing itself as "the music of yesterday with the sound of today" and promoting the superior audio quality of FM. Around this time the callsign changed as well, to XERFR-FM, and much like with AM, talk programming began to dominate, and from the late 1990s, XERFR-FM became the flagship FM station of Radio Fórmula airing its Primera Cadena.

== Programming ==
The Primera Cadena is Radio Fórmula's flagship network with its top-tier personalities and carriage across Mexico on several dozen affiliated stations, with programming from personalities including Azucena Uresti, Danielle Dithurbide, Maxine Woodside, Joaquín López-Dóriga, Chumel Torres, Eduardo Ruíz-Healy, Raúl Orvañanos, José Cárdenas, Maricarmen Cortés, Juan Becerra Acosta and Juan Pablo Pérez-Díaz. The programming is of a news and talk format.
