= XHO-FM =

News/talk radio station in Matamoros, Tamaulipas, Mexico

- Matamoros, Tamaulipas; Mexico
- Broadcast area: Brownsville–Matamoros
- Frequency: 93.5 MHz (HD Radio)
- Branding: 93.5 FM

Programming
- Format: Adult Contemporary

Ownership
- Owner: Grupo Gape Radio; (Radiodifusoras El Gallo, S.A. de C.V.)
- Sister stations: XEFD-AM, XHEOQ-FM, XEOR-AM

History
- First air date: August 24, 1946 (concession)
- Former call signs: XEO-AM (1946–2020)
- Former frequencies: 970 kHz (1946–2020)

Technical information
- Licensing authority: CRT
- Class: A
- ERP: 3,000 watts
- HAAT: 44.9 m (147 ft)

XHO-FM (93.5 MHz) is an Adult Contemporary radio station that serves the Brownsville, Texas (USA) / Matamoros, Tamaulipas (Mexico) border area.

== History ==
XEO received its concession on August 24, 1946. The station was initially owned by José María González, a prominent businessman in Matamoros and Nuevo Laredo who died in 1950. In 1949, XEO began simulcasting in Reynosa on XEOR; another station, XEOQ-AM, was set up in Río Bravo in 1960. On December 31, 2018, XEO-AM migrated to FM as XHO-FM 93.5.

XEO-AM closed down April 9, 2020.

== HD Radio ==
XHO-FM broadcasts in HD Radio and broadcasts 3 subchannels. Aside from the HD1, these additional subchannels are also on XHEOQ-FM:

- HD1: 93.5 FM
- HD2: Radio Fórmula 1° Cadena
- HD3: W Radio
- HD4: El Heraldo Radio

No authorization is on file with the IFT for these additional services. The HD2 sub was ESPN Deportes Radio until that network ceased operations on September 8, 2019; Unanimo was created with the goal of attracting the network's former affiliates and talent.
