= WJRM =

- Troy, North Carolina; United States
- Frequency: 1390 kHz

Programming
- Format: Gospel

Ownership
- Owner: Family Worship Ministries, Inc.

Technical information
- Facility ID: 43632
- Class: D
- Power: 1,000 watts day 35 watts night
- Transmitter coordinates: 35°21′43.00″N 79°51′38.00″W

Links
- Webcast: listen live

WJRM (1390 AM) is a radio station broadcasting a Gospel format. Licensed to Troy, North Carolina, United States. The station is currently owned by Family Worship Ministries, Inc..
