= WNAU =

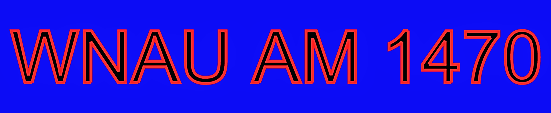
- New Albany, Mississippi; United States
- Frequency: 1470 kHz
- Branding: WNAU AM 1470

Programming
- Format: Oldies

Ownership
- Owner: Mpm Investment Group

History
- First air date: March 27, 1955

Technical information
- Licensing authority: FCC
- Facility ID: 7070
- Class: B
- Power: 2,500 watts day 500 watts night
- Transmitter coordinates: 34°29′48″N 89°0′52″W

Links
- Public license information: Public file; LMS

WNAU (1470 AM) is a radio station broadcasting an oldies music format. Licensed to New Albany, Mississippi, United States. The station is currently owned by Mpm Investment Group.
