= XHVIR-FM =

Radio station in Ciudad Victoria, Tamaulipas

- Ciudad Victoria, Tamaulipas; Mexico
- Frequency: 101.7 MHz
- Branding: La Cotorra

Programming
- Format: Grupera

Ownership
- Owner: Organización Radiofónica Tamaulipeca; (Organización Radiofónica Tamaulipeca, S.A. de C.V.)
- Sister stations: XHBJ-FM, XHHP-FM, XHGW-FM, XHRPV-FM

History
- First air date: August 26, 1994 (concession)

Technical information
- Licensing authority: CRT
- Class: C
- ERP: 100 kW
- HAAT: −118 m (−387 ft)
- Transmitter coordinates: 23°43′51.1″N 99°08′57.4″W

Links
- Website: ort.com.mx/radio/la-cotorra/

XHVIR-FM is a radio station in Ciudad Victoria, Tamaulipas, broadcasting on 101.7 FM. It airs a grupera format known as La Cotorra.

== History ==
Francisco Eugenio Filizola González obtained the concession for XHVIR on August 26, 1994. ORT acquired the station in 2000.
