= KDHN =

- Dimmitt, Texas; United States
- Broadcast area: Amarillo, Hereford, Clovis
- Frequency: 1470 kHz
- Branding: The Twister 1470 AM/102.7 FM

Programming
- Format: Country music

Ownership
- Owner: Nancy Whalen; (ELB Broadcasting, L.L.C.)

History
- Call sign meaning: Dimmit Hart Nazareth

Technical information
- Licensing authority: FCC
- Facility ID: 12297
- Class: D
- Power: 500 watts day 149 watts night
- Transmitter coordinates: 34°35′11.2″N 102°18′36.7″W
- Translator: 102.7 K274DG (Dimmitt)

Links
- Public license information: Public file; LMS
- Website: www.kdhnradio.com

KDHN (1470 AM, "The Twister") is a radio station broadcasting a country music format. Licensed to Dimmitt, Texas, United States, the station serves the Amarillo area. The station is currently owned by Nancy Whalen, through licensee ELB Broadcasting, L.L.C.

Logo before translator sign on
