= WRGA =

News/talk radio station in Rome, Georgia, United States

- Rome, Georgia; United States
- Broadcast area: Rome GA area
- Frequency: 1470 kHz
- Branding: 98.7 FM - 1470 AM

Programming
- Format: Conservative talk
- Affiliations: ABC News Radio

Ownership
- Owner: Rome Radio Partners, LLC

History
- First air date: March 5, 1930
- Former call signs: WFDV (1929–1934)
- Call sign meaning: Rome, Georgia

Technical information
- Licensing authority: FCC
- Facility ID: 40856
- Class: B
- Power: 5,000 watts
- Transmitter coordinates: 34°18′5.00″N 85°9′19.00″W
- Translator: 98.7 W254CF (Rome)

Links
- Public license information: Public file; LMS
- Webcast: Listen live
- Website: wrganews.com

WRGA (1470 AM, "News Talk 98.7 and AM 1470") is a commercial radio station licensed to Rome, Georgia, United States, and serves Floyd and adjacent counties of northwest Georgia, along with a portion of northeast Alabama. Owned by Rome Radio Partners, LLC, it features a conservative talk format, with programming relayed over low-power FM translator W254CF (98.7 FM).

Prior to spring 2009, WRGA was owned by McDougald Broadcasting, and was run by Southern Broadcasting Company, which is the owner-operator of WSRM FM 93.5, WQTU FM 102.3, WTSH FM 107.1, and WGJK AM 1360, from its studios on John Davenport Drive in Rome.

From spring 2004 to July 9, 2009, WRGA simulcast a substantially stronger and better quality signal on WSRM-FM. Until spring 2009, WSRM's radio tower was located in Coosa, Georgia; however after the ownership change the tower was moved to Mount Alto in Rome, and the carrier frequency was changed from 95.3 to 93.5 FM. The result was a substantial increase in the size of WSRM's coverage area, which led to issues which resulted in Rome Radio Partners having to end the five-year-old FM simulcast. WSRM's format was changed on July 9, 2009, to "Life FM", an "eclectic blend of Christian and secular adult contemporary" music; a later format change on WSRM was to country music.

WRGA operates under the tagline "Rome's NewsTalk". WRGA carries Brian Kilmeade, Erick Erickson, Sean Hannity, and Larry Elder during their daily program schedule. ABC News Radio is carried at the top of the hour.

Locally produced programming on WRGA includes First News with Tony McIntosh. Other popular locally produced programming included Talk of the Town, which was hosted by the late Nelle Reagan.

WRGA is the only station in Rome with a full-time video news team including News Director, David Crowder, and Digital News Editor, Ethan Garrett. Spot news coverage is provided as situations necessitate. Election coverage live from the Floyd County Courthouse is provided any day the polls are open.

As of March 1, 2014, WRGA also simulcasts on a broadcast translator at 98.7, with broadcast callsign W254CF. This change was partly to extend the coverage area at night, when skywave RF interference reduces the AM station's broadcast range. The addition of the FM signal was soon followed by a rebranding as "News Talk 98.7 and AM 1470, WRGA". The station has also been using the tag line "Local News Now" more heavily in 2014.

== History ==
The station began operation on March 5, 1930, as WFDV, operating on 1370 kHz with a power of 100 W. On June 26, 1931, the station was permitted to change its frequency to 1310 kHz. By April 1935 its callsign had become WRGA. On May 16, 1948, WRGA changed its frequency from 1490 kHz to 1470 kHz with a concurrent increase in power from 250 W to 5 KW.
