= XHRKS-FM =

Radio station in Reynosa, Tamaulipas

- Reynosa, Tamaulipas; Mexico
- Broadcast area: McAllen–Reynosa
- Frequency: 103.3 MHz (HD Radio)
- Branding: La Poderosa + Xtrema 103.3 FM

Programming
- Format: Grupera, Latin Urban and Reggaeton

Ownership
- Owner: Grupo AS; (Grupo Radiofónico de Reynosa, S.A. de C.V.)
- Sister stations: XHRT-FM, XERT-AM

History
- First air date: August 8, 1953
- Former call signs: XEJN-AM (1953–1962); XERKS-AM (1962–2020)
- Former frequencies: 940 kHz (1953–2020)

Technical information
- Licensing authority: CRT
- Class: A
- ERP: 3,000 watts
- HAAT: 42.7 m (140 ft)

Links
- Webcast: XHRKS Poderosa listen live
- Website: Website

XHRKS-FM (103.3 MHz) is a Spanish-language radio station that serves the McAllen, Texas (USA) / Reynosa, Tamaulipas (Mexico) border area.

== History ==
XEJN-AM 940 received its concession on August 8, 1953. It was owned by Radio Televisora de Reynosa, S.A. until 1993. The station burned down in a 1962 fire; its facilities were a total loss. After the fire, the call letters were changed to XERKS.

In April 2018, XERKS began its AM-FM migration by signing on XHRKS-FM 103.3. XERKS-AM shut down in December 2020.

As of July 1, 2021, XHRKS changed its format from Romantica to make way for La Poderosa grupera format.
