= XHHF-FM =

Radio station in Tampico, Tamaulipas, Mexico

- Tampico, Tamaulipas; Mexico
- Frequency: 96.9 FM
- RDS: EL HERALDO RADIO 96.9 FM - LA H SI QUE SUENA
- Branding: El Heraldo Radio

Programming
- Format: News/Talk

Ownership
- Owner: Grupo AS; (Grupo Radial de Tampico, S.A. de C.V.)
- Operator: El Heraldo de México
- Sister stations: XHS-FM, XHERP-FM, XHRRT-FM, XHRW-FM, XHETO-FM, XHAR-FM, XHMU-FM

History
- First air date: February 14, 1985 (concession)

Technical information
- Licensing authority: CRT
- Class: B
- ERP: 28.78 kW
- HAAT: 78.3 m (257 ft)

Links
- Webcast: grupoasradio.com
- Website: heraldodemexico.com.mx

XHHF-FM (branded as El Heraldo Radio) is a Mexican Spanish-language radio station that serves the Tampico, Tamaulipas market area.

== History ==
XHHF received its concession on February 14, 1985. It was owned by Juan Bautista Campo Rodríguez until 2003, when it was sold to Grupo Radial de Tampico.

On January 16, 2023, XHHF 90.1 and XHMU exchanged formats; La Ke Buena moved to 90.1.

On October 1, 2026, XHHF 96.9 and XHRRT exchanged formats; La Poderosa moved to 92.5.
