= XHMU-FM =

Radio station in Tampico, Tamaulipas, Mexico

- Tampico, Tamaulipas; Mexico
- Broadcast area: Tampico
- Frequency: 90.1 MHz
- RDS: 90.1 FM AQUI SUENA LA KEBUENA
- Branding: La Ke Buena

Programming
- Format: Regional Mexican
- Affiliations: Radiópolis

Ownership
- Owner: Grupo AS; (Estéreo Vida de Tampico, S.A. de C.V.)
- Sister stations: XHRW-FM, XHAR-FM, XHETO-FM, XHS-FM, XHRRT-FM, XHERP-FM, XHHF-FM

History
- First air date: April 18, 1986 (concession)

Technical information
- Licensing authority: CRT
- Class: B1
- ERP: 27.981 kW
- HAAT: 90.2 m
- Transmitter coordinates: 22°14′06″N 97°51′34″W

Links
- Webcast: Listen live
- Website: grupoasradio.com/estacion?sigla=XHMU; La KeBuena Website

XHMU-FM (branded as La Ke Buena) is a Mexican Spanish-language FM radio station that serves the Tampico, Tamaulipas market area.

== History ==
XHMU received its concession on April 18, 1986. It started broadcasting at 31 kW ERP and has reduced its power twice in its history, once in 1991 and again in 2013.

On January 16, 2023, XHMU and XHHF exchanged formats, La Poderosa moved to 96.9.
