= XHS-FM =

Radio station in Tampico, Tamaulipas, Mexico

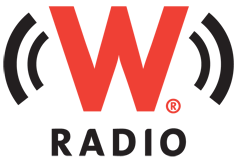
- Tampico, Tamaulipas; Mexico
- Frequency: 100.9 FM
- RDS: 100.9MHz OREJA LA ESTACION CON MAS OIDOS
- Branding: W Radio

Programming
- Language: Spanish
- Format: News/Talk, Spanish adult hits
- Affiliations: Radiópolis

Ownership
- Owner: Grupo AS; (Radio Televisora de Tampico, S.A.)
- Sister stations: XHHF-FM, XHERP-FM, XHRRT-FM, XHRW-FM, XHETO-FM, XHAR-FM, XHMU-FM

History
- First air date: 1930
- Former call signs: XEM-AM, XES-AM
- Former frequencies: 1055 kHz (1930-1950), 1240 kHz (1951-2014)

Technical information
- Licensing authority: CRT
- Class: B1
- ERP: 12,500 watts
- HAAT: 102.8 m (337 ft)
- Transmitter coordinates: 22°12′44″N 97°49′47″W

Links
- Webcast: Listen live
- Website: grupoasradio.com

XHS-FM (branded as W Radio) is a Mexican Spanish-language radio station that serves the Tampico, Tamaulipas, Mexico market area.

== History ==
XES-AM received its concession in 1930 and initially broadcast on 1055 kHz. Originally owned by Fernando Sada, In 1932 created the first radio station in Tampico XES was sold to Difusora Porteña, S. de R.L., in 1938, and to Radio Televisora de Tampico, the current concessionaire, in 1951. It also moved frequencies to 1240 AM.

In 2012, XES was authorized to move to FM as XHS-FM on 100.9 MHz.

Until July 30, 2021, the station carried Christian programming under the name "Radio Unción", in addition to W Radio programming. That same day the station took on the "W Radio Tampico" branding full time.

On June 19, 2023, it changed its name to Oreja WFM, keeping some programs from W Radio, including "Así las Cosas" with Carlos Loret de Mola. On November 17, 2025, it returns to W Radio programming.
