= XHLI-FM (Guerrero) =

Radio station in Chilpancingo, Guerrero, Mexico

XHLI-FM / XELI-AM
- Chilpancingo, Guerrero; Mexico
- Frequencies: 94.7 FM; 1580 AM
- Branding: El Heraldo Radio

Programming
- Format: News / talk
- Affiliations: El Heraldo de México

Ownership
- Owner: Radio S.A.; (Voz del Sur, S.A.)
- Operator: Grupo Radio Visión and El Heraldo de México

History
- First air date: May 8, 1961 (concession)

Technical information
- Power: 1 kW day; 0.25 kW night
- ERP: 2.778 kW

Links
- Webcast: XHLI-FM
- Website: heraldodemexico.com.mx

XHLI-FM/XELI-AM is a radio station combo in Chilpancingo, Guerrero. Broadcasting on 94.7 FM and 1580 AM, it is owned by Radio S.A., and operated in alliance with Grupo Radio Visión and El Heraldo de México, and carries its El Heraldo Radio news format.

== History ==
The concession for XELI-AM was awarded in 1961. In 1994, the station obtained its FM counterpart.
