= XEFE-TDT =

Television station in Nuevo Laredo

- Nuevo Laredo, Tamaulipas; Laredo, Texas; Mexico–United States
- Channels: Digital: 17 (UHF); Virtual: 17
- Branding: XEFE

Programming
- Affiliations: Canal Once

Ownership
- Owner: Ramona Esparza González

History
- First air date: October 1, 1962
- Former call signs: XEFE-TV (1962–2015)
- Former channel numbers: 2 (analog VHF, 1962–2015; digital, 2014–2016)
- Former affiliations: SIN (1960s); Televisa (to 2020)
- Call sign meaning: "Jefe", Spanish word for chief, from XEFE-AM radio

Technical information
- Licensing authority: CRT
- ERP: 100 kW
- Transmitter coordinates: 27.4569951°N 99.5218769°W

Links
- Website: xefetv.com

XEFE-TDT (channel 17) is a television station in Nuevo Laredo, Tamaulipas, Mexico, serving the Laredo, Texas area in the United States, known as XEFE, La Imagen Familiar. XEFE primarily carries programming from the public Canal Once network as well as local news, information and entertainment programming. XEFE was the last television station in the Laredo – Nuevo Laredo area to broadcast digitally, doing so for the first time in March 2014.

== History ==
XEFE-TV signed on channel 2 on October 1, 1962, making it the first television station in Nuevo Laredo and second in the Laredo – Nuevo Laredo area after KGNS, which first went on the air January 7, 1956. In February 2013, XEFE received authorization from COFETEL to broadcast in digital on RF channel 17. XEFE began broadcasting in digital in March 2014, ten months ahead of the market's analog shutoff in January 2015.

In October 2016, changes to allotment of virtual channels required XEFE to vacate channel 2 and begin using virtual channel 17, as channel 2 was nationally allocated for Las Estrellas.

Previously carrying national Televisa programming from Gala TV/NU9VE and FOROtv, XEFE dropped Televisa programs on July 1, 2020, and picked up national news and some programs from public Canal Once, which does not have a transmitter in the market.

== Technical information ==
XEFE began broadcasting in digital in March 2014, making it the last television station in the Laredo–Nuevo Laredo area to broadcast in digital, just ten months before analog shutoff in the Nuevo Laredo area in January 2015. It has one subchannel, 17.1, carrying its main programming.

=== Subchannel ===
Subchannel of XEFE-TDT
| Channel | Res. | Short name | Programming |
|---|---|---|---|
| 17.1 | 1080i | XEFE | Main XEFE programming |
