= XERT-AM =

Radio station in Reynosa, Tamaulipas

- Reynosa, Tamaulipas; Mexico
- Broadcast area: McAllen–Reynosa
- Frequency: 1170 kHz
- Branding: La Más Picuda

Programming
- Format: Grupera

Ownership
- Owner: Grupo Radiorama; (Publicidad Unida de Reynosa, S.A. de C.V.)
- Sister stations: XHRT-FM, XHRKS-FM

History
- First air date: July 7, 1943
- Former frequencies: 590 kHz
- Call sign meaning: Reynosa, Tamaulipas

Technical information
- Licensing authority: CRT
- Class: B
- Power: 5,000 watts day
- Transmitter coordinates: 26°02′43.5″N 98°14′16.8″W

Links
- Webcast: Listen live
- Website: www.radiorama.mx/aradios.php?id=232

XERT-AM (1170 kHz) is a Spanish-language radio station that serves the McAllen, Texas (USA) / Reynosa, Tamaulipas (Mexico) border area. XERT is a daytime only station because 1170 AM is a United States clear-channel frequency.

== History ==
XERT's original concession dates to July 7, 1943. It was owned by Ignacio Magallón Valdivia and broadcast on 590 kHz before moving to 1170.
