= XHETO-FM =

Radio station in Tampico, Tamaulipas

- Tampico, Tamaulipas; Mexico
- Broadcast area: Tampico
- Frequency: 98.5 MHz
- RDS: ROMANTIK XHETO FM 98.5 FM
- Branding: Romántica 98.5

Programming
- Format: Spanish adult hits
- Affiliations: Grupo Radiorama

Ownership
- Owner: Grupo AS; (Radio Tiempo, S.A. de C.V.)
- Sister stations: XHRW-FM, XHAR-FM, XHMU-FM, XHS-FM, XHRRT-FM, XHHF-FM, XHERP-FM

History
- First air date: January 3, 1948 (concession)
- Former call signs: XETO-AM
- Former frequencies: 1400 kHz, 950 kHz

Technical information
- Licensing authority: CRT
- Class: B1
- ERP: 25,000 watts
- HAAT: 90.2 m (296 ft)
- Transmitter coordinates: 22°14′06″N 97°51′34″W

Links
- Webcast: Listen live
- Website: Grupo AS

XHETO-FM (branded as Romántica 98.5) is a radio station that serves Tampico, Tamaulipas.

== History ==
XETO-AM 1400 received its concession on January 3, 1948. The 1,000-watt station, owned by the Sanabria family, moved to 950 kHz in the 1990s and increased its power to 5,000 watts in the 2000s.

XETO is noteworthy as one of the first affiliates of Radiorama upon its foundation in 1970.

XETO migrated to FM as XHETO-FM 98.5 after being cleared to move in April 2012.
