= El Heraldo de México =

Mexican daily newspaper

- Type: Daily newspaper
- Format: Tabloid
- Owner: Grupo Andrade
- Founded: November 9, 1965; May 2, 2017 (relaunch)
- Ceased publication: 2003
- Language: Spanish
- Headquarters: Mexico City
- Website: heraldodemexico.com.mx

El Heraldo de México is a Mexican national daily newspaper published in Mexico City. Initially founded in 1965, after a 14-year absence of the name, the newspaper was relaunched on May 2, 2017.

== History ==
=== Original El Heraldo de México ===
The original newspaper was launched by the Alarcón family on November 9, 1965. The newspaper came on the scene as a technological leader, with a Goss Urbanite press and eventually a custom-built facility in the Colonia Doctores neighborhood. It was printed in color, a rarity for Mexican papers of the time, which often remained in black-and-white for several more decades. It was often considered loyal to governments in power.

The newspaper had a traditional emphasis on society and entertainment news. It sponsored the El Heraldo de México Awards, an annual media and sports award, given out between 1966 and 2002.

=== Diario Monitor ===
In October 2003, José Gutiérrez Vivó, host and president of Grupo Monitor, associated with the Monitor radio newscast and Mexico City's Radio Monitor 1320/1560, acquired El Heraldo de México and its sister daily, El Heraldo de Puebla. The Mexico City newspaper became known as Diario Monitor on March 8, 2004. In 2007, El Heraldo de Puebla, which was not affected by the new name, was sold off to local businessman Ricardo Henaine.

Monitor experienced financial difficulties in the mid-late 2000s, stemming from contract issues with Grupo Radio Centro, that ultimately claimed the entire business. The final issue of Diario Monitor was printed on February 13, 2009.

=== Relaunch ===
In late 2016, rumors began to surface about the relaunch of a new El Heraldo de México. Those rumors became reality on May 2, 2017, when the new newspaper made its debut with a run of 60,000 copies. The relaunched newspaper is owned by Grupo Andrade, one of the largest sellers of new cars in the country, and Ricardo and Roberto Henaine.

The new paper is published in 40 pages during the week, 16 pages on Saturday and 21 on Sunday.

== Broadcasting ==
On June 16, 2019, Andrade announced the acquisition of two FM radio stations from Grupo Imagen, XHDL-FM in Mexico City and XHAV-FM in Guadalajara, pending IFT approval. Later that year, it began broadcasting Heraldo Televisión by leasing XHTRES-TDT Mexico City from Imagen.

It also operates eight more stations: XHHF-FM 96.9 MHz in Tampico, Tamaulipas, XEPE-AM 1700 kHz in Tijuana, Baja California, XHO-FM 93.5 MHz HD4 in Matamoros, Tamaulipas, XHEOQ-FM 91.7 MHz HD4 in Reynosa, Tamaulipas, XHRPO-FM 97.7 MHz in Oaxaca de Juárez, Oaxaca and XHSP-FM 99.7 MHz in Monterrey, Nuevo León.

== Affiliates owned by El Heraldo Radio ==
- XELI-AM 1580 kHz and XHLI-FM 94.7 MHz Chilpancingo, Guerrero
- XHAV-FM 100.3 MHz - Guadalajara, Jalisco
- XHDL-FM 98.5 MHz - Mexico City
- XHSP-FM 99.7 MHz - Monterrey, Nuevo León
- XHRPO-FM 97.7 MHz - Oaxaca, Oaxaca
- XHEOQ-FM 91.7 MHz HD4 - Reynosa, Tamaulipas
- XHHF-FM 96.9 MHz - Tampico, Tamaulipas
- XHCCBK-FM 103.3 MHz - Tepic, Nayarit
- XHERS-FM 104.3 MHz - Torreón, Coahuila
- XHRPR-FM 88.3 MHz - Tuxtla Gutierrez, Chiapas

== See also ==
- Communications in Mexico
- List of newspapers in Mexico
