= XEEW-FM =

Radio station in Matamoros, Tamaulipas, Mexico

- Matamoros, Tamaulipas; Mexico
- Broadcast area: Brownsville–Matamoros
- Frequency: 97.7 FM
- Branding: Los 40

Programming
- Format: Contemporary hit radio
- Affiliations: Radiopolis

Ownership
- Owner: RadioDual S.A. de C.V.; (Sucesión de Jorge Cárdenas González)
- Sister stations: XEEW-AM

History
- First air date: 1978

Technical information
- Licensing authority: CRT
- Class: A
- ERP: 2,860 watts
- HAAT: 64.17 m (210.5 ft)

Links
- Webcast: Listen live 97-7
- Website: los40rgv.com

XEEW-FM (97.7 MHz) is a radio station in Matamoros, Tamaulipas, Mexico, serving Matamoros and Brownsville, Texas, United States. It carries the Los 40 format from Radiopolis.
