= XEAM-AM =

Radio station in Matamoros, Tamaulipas

- Matamoros, Tamaulipas; Mexico
- Broadcast area: Brownsville, Texas, United States/Matamoros, Mexico
- Frequency: 1310 kHz
- Branding: La Líder 1310

Programming
- Format: News/talk and Spanish classic hits

Ownership
- Owner: Corporativo Radiofónico de México; (XEAM de Matamoros, S.A. de C.V.)
- Sister stations: XEFE-AM, XHLE-FM, XHMCA-FM

History
- First air date: April 18, 1935

Technical information
- Licensing authority: CRT
- Class: B
- Power: 1,000 watts day 250 watts night

Links
- Webcast: Listen live
- Website: La Lider 1310 Website; La Lider 1310 on the Facebook of CRM Noticias

XEAM-AM (1310 kHz) is a Spanish-language radio station that serves the Brownsville, Texas (USA) / Matamoros, Tamaulipas (Mexico) border area.

== History ==
Logo as La Mandona 1310

XEAM began life in 1934 on 730 kHz, originally assigned to Nuevo Laredo, Tamaulipas. It was owned by Manuel L. Salinas and broadcast with a power of 7,500 watts. However, XEAM never broadcast in Nuevo Laredo. It signed on in Matamoros on April 18, 1935, and eventually broadcast on 1400 kHz with 500 watts. It raised its power to 5,000 watts and moved to 1450 kHz, though it eventually relocated to 1310 at 1,000 watts. By the 1960s, the concessionaire was Radiodifusoras Unidas Mexicanas de Matamoros, S.A., an affiliate of the RUMSA network.

In 2017, station group Grupo Mi Radio became known as Corporativo Radiofónico de México after it was sold by Roberto Chapa Zavala to businessman Luis Alfredo Biassi.
