= XHHP-FM =

Radio station in Ciudad Victoria, Tamaulipas

- Ciudad Victoria, Tamaulipas; Mexico
- Frequency: 97.5 FM
- Branding: La Más Prendida

Programming
- Format: Classic Regional Mexican

Ownership
- Owner: Organización Radiofónica Tamaulipeca; (Victoria Radio Publicidad, S.A. de C.V.)
- Sister stations: XHBJ-FM, XHGW-FM, XHVIR-FM, XHRPV-FM

History
- First air date: October 23, 1956 (concession)

Technical information
- Licensing authority: CRT
- Class: B1
- ERP: 5,380 watts
- HAAT: −117.8 m (−386 ft)
- Transmitter coordinates: 23°43′07.8″N 99°07′52.7″W

Links
- Website: La Más Prendida listen live

XHHP-FM (branded as La Más Prendida) is a Spanish-language radio station in Ciudad Victoria, Tamaulipas.

== History ==
XEHP-AM 580 received its concession on October 23, 1956. It was owned by Alfonso Flores López and broadcast with 1,000 watts during the day and 150 at night. Enrique Cárdenas González, from the family that founded ORT, bought XEHP in 1977; it was transferred to Victoria Radio Publicidad in 1991 and migrated to FM in 2011.
