= XHBJ-FM =

Radio station in Ciudad Victoria, Tamaulipas, Mexico

- Benito Juárez (Ciudad Victoria), Tamaulipas; Mexico
- Frequency: 94.5 MHz
- RDS: ORT RADIO EXA FM 94.5
- Branding: Exa FM

Programming
- Format: Contemporary hit radio
- Affiliations: MVS Radio

Ownership
- Owner: Organización Radiofónica Tamaulipeca; (Radio Televisora de Ciudad Victoria, S.A. de C.V.)
- Sister stations: XHHP-FM, XHGW-FM, XHVIR-FM, XHRPV-FM

History
- First air date: 1939
- Former frequencies: 1450 kHz; 970 kHz; 107.1 MHz (2012–2019)
- Call sign meaning: Benito Juárez

Technical information
- Licensing authority: CRT
- Class: B1
- ERP: 14,750 watts
- HAAT: −88.4 m (−290 ft)
- Transmitter coordinates: 23°47′47.7″N 99°07′56.2″W

Links
- Webcast: Listen live
- Website: exafm.com (Exa FM website) ort.com.mx (ORT website)

XHBJ-FM is a radio station on 94.5 FM in Ciudad Victoria, Tamaulipas, Mexico. It carries the Exa FM pop format from MVS Radio and is owned by Organización Radiofónica Tamaulipeca.

== History ==
XHBJ was the first radio station in Ciudad Victoria. On August 26, 1939, XEBJ-AM received its concession. Owned by Fernando Elizalde Ramos, XEBJ broadcast on 1450 kHz with 100 watts from a facility in the Campo Turista Victoria. XEBJ later moved to 970 kHz and increased power to 1,000 watts during the day and 250 at night. In 1964, Radio Televisora de Ciudad Victoria bought XEBJ, and in 1971, it gained a sister station when the same company started XERPV-AM 1340. In the 1990s, XEBJ increased its nighttime power to 1,000 watts.

On December 22, 2011, ORT stations, including XHBJ, were cleared to move to FM. XHBJ-FM 107.1 came to air the next year. XHBJ was required to move to 94.5 MHz in 2017 as a condition of the renewal of its concession, in order to clear 106-108 MHz as much as possible for community and indigenous stations, a change that became effective on May 19, 2019.
