= XEFE-AM =

Radio station in Nuevo Laredo, Tamaulipas

Coordinates: 27.4569951°N 99.5218769°W

- Nuevo Laredo, Tamaulipas; Mexico
- Broadcast area: Nuevo Laredo, Tamaulipas; Laredo, Texas
- Frequency: 790 kHz
- Branding: 790, La Radio de Nuevo Laredo

Programming
- Format: News/talk and Regional Mexican

Ownership
- Owner: Hera de Zeus, S.A. de C.V.
- Sister stations: XEAM-AM, XHLE-FM, XHMCA-FM

History
- First air date: 1920s

Technical information
- Licensing authority: CRT
- Class: B
- Power: 1,000 watts day 500 watts night

Links
- Webcast: Listen live
- Website: crmradio.mx/790-2/

XEFE-AM (790 kHz) is a radio station in Nuevo Laredo, Tamaulipas, Mexico.

== History ==
XEFE is among the oldest radio stations in Nuevo Laredo. It came to air in the 1920s, and by 1932 it was owned by Rafael Tijerina Carranza, who would found XEFE-TV in the same city. It originally broadcast on 1000 kHz.

On November 25, 1986, XEFE-AM-TV was sold to Ramona "Ramoncita" Esparza González. Esparza would sell the AM station in 2008 to Manuel Cristóbal Montiel Govea. Govea sold it in 2022 to Hera de Zeus, S.A. de C.V., which is owned by Guadalupe Biasi Serrano and Cecilia Faisal Martínez.
