= XHMCA-FM =

Radio station in Pánuco, Veracruz

Currently silent
- Pánuco, Veracruz; Mexico
- Frequency: 104.3 MHz

Ownership
- Owner: Corporativo Radiofónico de México; (XEMCA del Golfo, S.A. de C.V.)
- Sister stations: XHLE-FM

History
- First air date: November 29, 1979 (concession)
- Last air date: August 1, 2026
- Former call signs: XEMCA-AM
- Former frequencies: 1090 AM

Technical information
- Licensing authority: CRT
- Class: B1
- ERP: 12.5 kW
- HAAT: 59.30 m
- Transmitter coordinates: 22°03′25.4″N 98°10′43.7″W

XHMCA-FM (Currently silent) is a Mexican Spanish-language radio station in Pánuco, Veracruz.

== History ==
XEMCA-AM 1090 received its concession on November 29, 1979. Owned by Homero Barrenechea Domínguez and later by his estate, XEMCA broadcast with 5,000 watts during the day and 500 at night.

The concession passed to Blanca Elena Anitua y Ruiz in 2001 and to the current company in 2003. XEMCA was cleared to migrate to FM in 2011.

In 2008 XEMCA adopted the name La Reina de las Huastecas carries with regional mexican format.

In 2017, station group Grupo Mi Radio became known as Corporativo Radiofónico de México after it was sold by Roberto Chapa Zavala to businessman Luis Alfredo Biassi.

In August 1, 2026 XHMCA close the transmissions due the short circuit of the FM transmitter during the 47 years in 2026 from the air.
