= XHLE-FM =

Radio station in Ciudad Cuauhtémoc, Veracruz, serving Tampico, Tamaulipas

Currenlty silent
- Ciudad Cuauhtémoc, Veracruz; Mexico
- Broadcast area: Tampico, Tamaulipas
- Frequency: 105.9 MHz

Ownership
- Owner: Corporativo Radiofónico de México; (Grupo Coral de Tampico, S.A. de C.V.)
- Sister stations: XHMCA-FM

History
- First air date: March 29, 1958 (68 years ago)
- Former call signs: XELE-AM
- Former frequencies: 1300 kHz, 920 kHz

Technical information
- Licensing authority: CRT
- Class: B1
- ERP: 12.5 kW
- HAAT: 62.50 m
- Transmitter coordinates: 22°14′33″N 97°51′16.6″W

XHLE-FM (Currently silent) was an FM radio station in Ciudad Cuauhtémoc, Veracruz that serves the Tampico, Tamaulipas market.

== History ==
XELE-AM 1300 received its concession on March 29, 1958, broadcasting from Tampico. The 1000-watt station remained on 1300 through 2003, when it moved its transmitter from Villa Cuauhtémoc, Veracruz, in Pueblo Viejo Municipality, to the XEMCA-AM facility in Los Pichones and changed frequencies to 920. Migration to FM was authorized in November 2010,

In December 2018, Corporativo Radiofonico de México launched the new station called La Lider de Tampico with grupera music without commercial breaks.

In 2019 La Lider de Tampico carries a grupera music it could take six years from the end in 2025.

In November 2025 La Lider de Tampico changes the grupera music replaced with spanish classic hits into the 80s, 90s, 2000s and 2010s with pop music and romantic.

In December 1, 2025 Corporativo Radiofonico de México changes the spanish classic hits format called La Radio de Tampico removed the slogan called La Lider adopted in December 14, 2025.

In March 2026 due the high winds La Radio de Tampico while transmitting pop and romantic music in spanish from the 80s, 90s and 2000s, suffered the short circuit from FM transmitter

In March 30, 2026, XHLE closed the broadcast during 68 years in 2026, still to listen in internet.
