= Radio Fórmula =

Mexican news/talk radio network

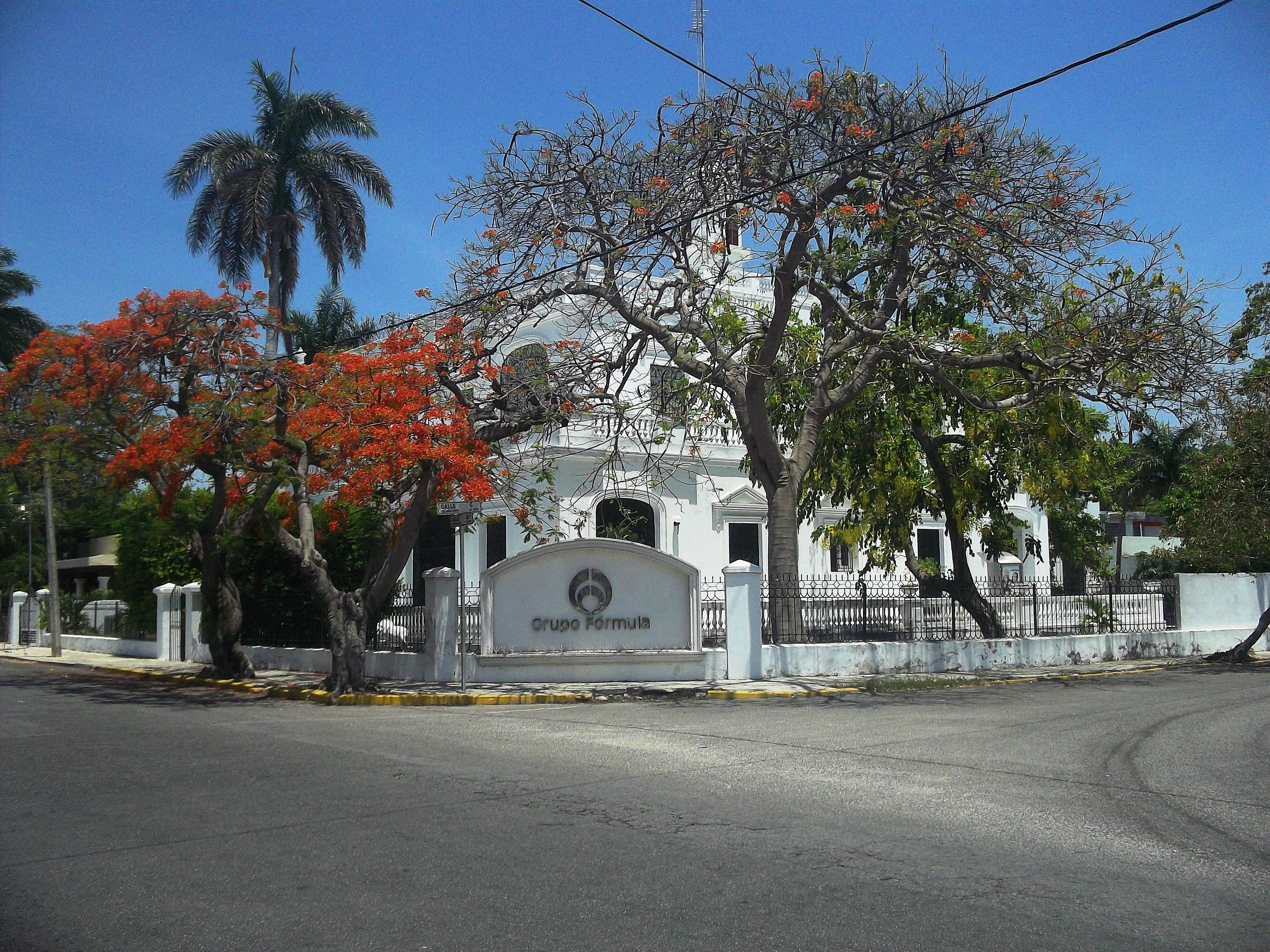
- Radio Fórmula (XHZ-FM) in Mérida, Yucatán
- Country: Mexico
- Broadcast area: Mexico City and various Mexican cities
- Headquarters: Mexico City

Programming
- Format: News/talk radio network

Ownership
- Owner: Grupo Fórmula

History
- Launch date: 1968

Links
- Webcast: Primera Cadena Segunda Cadena
- Website: grupoformula.com.mx

Radio Fórmula is a Mexican talk radio network. Founded in 1968, Radio Fórmula programs are broadcast on more than 100 stations in Mexico as well as several stations in the United States.

It is the flagship product of Grupo Fórmula, which also owns the TeleFórmula pay TV network (itself made up of Radio Fórmula video simulcasts), and PM Onstreet, an outdoor advertising firm.

== History ==
Grupo Fórmula traces its beginnings to 1968, when several Mexico City stations were split from Emilio Azcárraga Vidaurreta's Radiópolis system. Among these was XEDF-AM 970. By 1984, Radio Fórmula operated five Mexico City stations: 970 AM, 1470 AM, 1500 AM, 103.3 FM and 104.1 FM.

On September 19, 1985, Radio Fórmula's headquarters in downtown Mexico City were destroyed by an 8.1 earthquake, which killed several hosts and employees and knocked the AM stations off the air for nearly a month (the FM stations' transmitters are based at the Torre Latinoamericana). The network later relocated to the Polanco neighborhood in the west of the city. Journalist Pedro Ferriz de Con, who hosted a morning newscast on XEDF-AM, barely managed to survive and spent over a year hospitalized, while Sergio Rod and Gustavo Calderón, morning hosts on XEAI-AM, perished.

In 1987, Radio Fórmula was relaunched under the management of Rogerio Azcárraga Madero, nephew of Emilio Azcárraga Vidaurreta. This led to the establishment of a program schedule that offered a wide range of programs in news, sports, finance, entertainment and women's talk. Among the personalities that have worked for Radio Fórmula over the years are Jorge Saldaña, Héctor Lechuga, Joaquín López-Dóriga, Maxine Woodside, Paola Rojas and Óscar Mario Beteta.

In 1994, Radio Fórmula began to expand nationally and created three national networks featuring the programs of their major personalities. This unit is now known as Radio Fórmula Estados. In 2003, Radio Fórmula programming began to be available in the United States, on stations such as KUNX in Ventura County, California.

== Programming ==
Radio Fórmula is organized into three national networks: the Primera Cadena (led by XERFR-AM/FM), the Segunda Cadena (XEDF-AM/FM), Tercera Cadena (XEAI-AM) and Trion.
