= Ciudad Mante =

Mante, Tamaulipas
- City
- Ciudad Mante
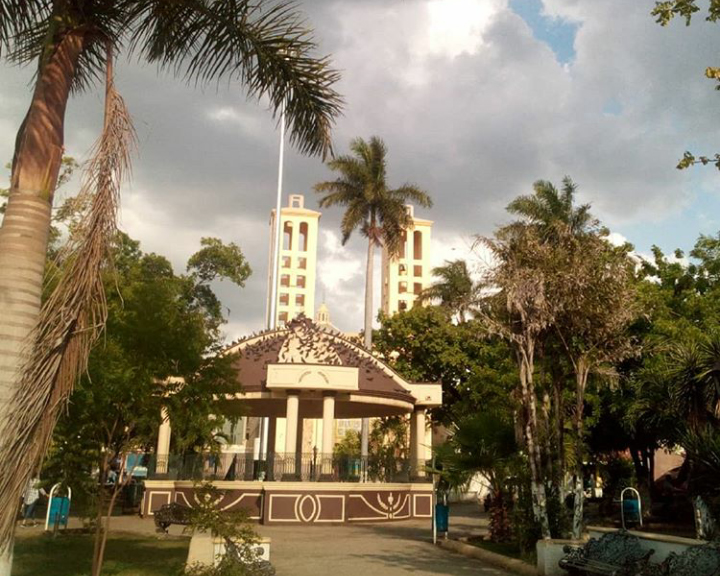
- Center of Ciudad Mante

- Location within Tamaulipas Location within Mexico
- Coordinates: 22°44′0″N 98°57′0″W
- Country: Mexico
- State: Tamaulipas
- Municipio: El Mante

Government
  - Mayor: Martha Patricia Chio de la Garza

Area
  - Total: 1,699.98 km^{2} (656.37 sq mi)
- Elevation: 80 m (260 ft)

Population (2005)
  - Total: 112,061
  - Density: 65.9/km^{2} (171/sq mi)
- Time zone: UTC-6 (CST)

Mante, formally Ciudad Mante, is a city in the Mexican state of Tamaulipas. The city is the municipal seat of El Mante municipality in extreme southern Tamaulipas, and lies in the northwestern portion of the municipality. It had a 2005 census population of 81,884 inhabitants, or about 73 percent of El Mante's total of 112,061. The city is the state's ninth-largest community in population. El Mante has an area of 1,699.98 km^{2} (656.37 sq mi), and includes smaller outlying communities such as Celaya, El Limón, El Abra, Nueva Apolonia, and El Naranjo. Ciudad Mante is served by the Ciudad Mante National Airport.

Mante's official slogan is Donde el Azucar es mas Dulce que la Miel. ("Where sugar is sweeter than honey.")

== History ==
The region known today as Mante is taken from the Huastecan Indian name, "cinco potreros de Tamatán", or the five pasture grounds, and in the "Tenek" or Huastecan language a word that means, "the embarkation of canoes."

According to various documents, it was a very unsanitary place due to the flooding that the land suffered when the regional rivers overflowed, and more so due to the Mante River whose waters stagnated for months without any exit causing caused the formation of large lime deposits that afterwards became a breeding ground for mosquitos and horse-flies whose sting was very painful. Due to these insupportable and unsanitary conditions the Spanish could not colonize the region permanently, although due to the rich and fertile capability of the ground they did farm the area.

According to several studies there were several Indian tribes of "collectors-hunters" that inhabited the area with the Parnes, Chichimecas and Janambres as the predominant tribes in the area. The Janambres represented a formidable danger to those who attempted colonization as they attacked all who tried to settle in the "Tamatán" area. There are many stories that the Janambres were constantly hostile towards the colonists and when these fought to repel the attacks, the Indians withdrew to the hills.

On the other hand, there are indications that early in the conquest of Mexico the region of Mante was visited by several Augustinian missionaries, among them Friar Juan de Mesa, Friar Nicolas de San Paulo (last name Witte); Friar Comel de Bye and Friar Antonio de Roa, who ministered in several areas such as Tamezin (Tamesi, Tanchipa) and Tanguachin. These facts are taken from Doctor Patricia Osante in her book Orígenes del Nuevo Santander (The Origins of New Santander).

However, according to the available evidence, neither of these Augustinian missionaries established a mission or any other colony, or at least, none of the evidence gives one reason to believe so. Therefore, the "Cinco Potreros de Tamatán" (Five Pastures of Tamatan), also known as "Frondoso Paraje de Canoas" (The Luxuriant Embarkation of Canoes) or (The Leafy Embarkation of Canoes), was not considered by the founding officials, including the Escandón family.

The poor quality of the lands of San Juan Bautista de Horcasitas (today Magiscatzín, a township of González, founded by José de Escandón May 11, 1749), forced several of his fellow colonists to migrate towards the mountain range of Tanchipa, including the surrounding areas of the Mante River spring. In this area they began to cultivate the fertile lands that guaranteed them excellent harvests of corn, beans, sugar cane, peppers and fruit, which they used for their subsistence and commercial reasons. So it was that in November, 1750, when Escandón was on an inspection visit in Horcasitas, that he found the area already populated. Finding it justifiable he proceeded to donate these lands to the Bishop of Manila, Don Manuel Antonio Rojo de la Fuente and Vieyra, who accepted them.

After fulfilling all the legal requirements, Escandón orders Captain Juan Antonio de Barberena to take possession or the lands known as "Cinco Potreros de Tamatán" (The Five Pastures of Tamatán), which according to the testimony of the same Barberena occurred March 8, 1764, at the same time taking an official census of the marketing colonists, and belongings of the Hustecan and Olive Indians that lived in the Horcasitas. Miguel Velazquez and Ausencio Hernández represented the colonists and Andrés (Andrew) Gómez the Indians. There were thirty five colonists living in the immediate vicinity of the Mante River spring and sixty six in the area from Abra to Tanchipa. On the basis of this historical data, some people consider this date and these colonists the founders of what was then known as "Frondoso Paraje de Canoas" (The Luxuriant Embarkation of Canoes) or (The Leafy Embarkation of Canoes), later known as "Rancho Canoas" (Canoe Ranch), and later still as Villa Juárez (Juarez Village), and now as Ciudad Mante (Mante City). However, we should recognize that a dividing of the land among the inhabitants does not constitute the founding of a town or city, and in this sense, the Ciudad Mante (City of Mante) does not possess a precise founding date.

=== Origin of the name ===
Mr. Hipolito Aviles, a citizen and researcher living in Mante, submits that the word "mante" comes from the Nahuatl language and is composed of three syllables in that language: "man", "atl" and "tetl", which mean "place of", "water" and "rock". Taken together these words mean "the place of the water in the rock" or "where the water comes out of the rock", alluding to the Mante River spring, where the water surges forth from the rock in the "Sierra de Cucharas". However, this region was never inhabited by the Nahuatl Indians. The tribes that lived here were Huastecan, a branch of the Maya, and their language was "tének" or "huasteco" (Huastecan), and not Nahuatl. According to the research of educators who have studied the Tenek language, the word "mante" is of Tének origin and is formed from two roots which are: "man" meaning "yellow", and "te" meaning "stick" or "tree". Therefore, the word "mante" refers to the tree of that name, and whose fruit, upon ripening is of such an intense yellow color that it gives the same yellow appearance to the leaves of this tree when seen from a distance. At the same time this tree gives the River Mante its name, later to the sugar mill and to the City of Mante. If the version of Mr. Aviles were true, then only the river would have this name but not the tree because the tree does not "surge forth from the water in the rock." On this basis, the name "Mante" came from the tree in the family of the sapota tree with the same name. "Mante" therefore means "yellow stick (or tree)."

== Tourism ==
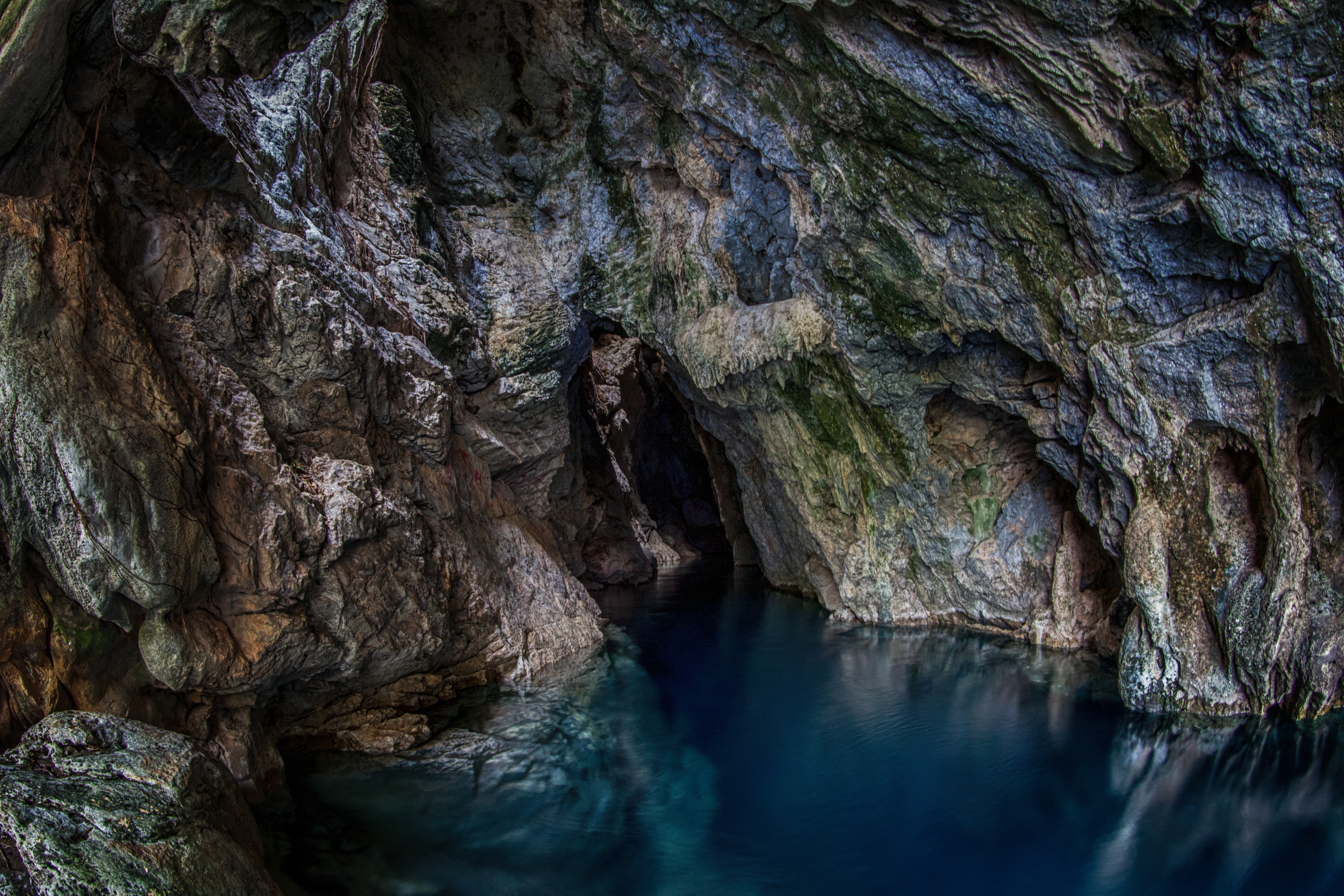
El Nacimiento

The city of Mante has a number of tourist attractions, including several which are located in the immediate area surrounding Mante.

La Difusora is an irrigation channel that is also used as a local swimming area. Its name derives from a former radio station located immediately west of the channel. A nine-million-peso project modified the man-made channel to improve safety. Local food vendors operate nearby in the afternoons.

"El Nacimiento" Or the "Birthplace" is 7 miles by graveled road from the city and accessible in all seasons. This is a spring with water flowing from the rocks in the "Sierra de Cucharas" (Spoon Ridge Mountains). It is a tourist spot with swimming and boat rides.

"La Aguja" "The Needle" is a swimming place located approximately 4 miles from Mante. It was (constructed) along with the construction of a dam on the Mante River which is used to irrigate the large sugar cane plantations of the region. This dam was constructed between 1927 and 1929 and inaugurated August 9, 1929. From here one can navigate upstream until arriving at the "Nacimiento".

The Beaches of Limon are to the North 7.5 miles away where the township of Limon with a population that is closely knit with Cd. Mante. The Sabinas and Frio (Cold River) join flowing into the Guayalejo River. This area is visited by a large number of tourists.

The cave at "El Abra" and the natural cave of Quintero are two of the caverns in the Cuchara Sierra, and are the most frequently visited in the region because of the close proximity to Cd. Mante. In the cave at El Abra is the "basement" located at the bottom of its interior 380 feet from the entrance. It was partially explored by cave explorers from San Antonio, Texas in 1956. In the natural cavern of Quintero are thousands of bats that emerge at eventide from the cave to search for food in the surrounding areas.

El Castillo De Nueva Apolonia

A castle-like building was constructed during the last century that belonged to the large hacienda "El Naranjo" (The Orange Tree). It was famous during its time, having received guests such as General Porfirio Diaz. It is located to the south of the village called Nueva Apolonia. The Castle of Nueva Apolonia lies in ruins today, the original upstairs grand piano and bathtubs have been picked off by looters and the staircase to the top floor is just waiting to give out. Next to the castle we can find a small chapel where multiple graves with sarcophagus like stone covers. The place is in ruins and the local population has desecrated these elaborate resting places in search of loot. The castle is also very deteriorated, with vines and trees growing from the inside, most tiling is gone but the original paint can be seen on most walls. The castle stands today as a monument of the former hacienda El Naranjo, with the original coat of arms in lobby, with little hope of Restoration, it will continue to degrade and fall to ruin.

El Cielo (The Heaven) a protected cloud forest covers a land mass of 144,530 hectares (~357,129 acres) and is a paradise for the great quantity of species that inhabit it. There are 175 distinct species of migratory birds and 225 local fowl, various amphibious and mammals, as well as white tail deer, jaguar and black bear. This is due to the unique climatological, biological and topographical conditions in El Cielo.
