= 88.7 FM =

FM radio frequency

The following radio stations broadcast on FM frequency 88.7 MHz:

== Antarctica ==
- 88.7 FM at McMurdo, Ross Dependency

== Argentina ==
- Alternativa in Berazategui, Buenos Aires
- Cadena Río in La Plata, Buenos Aires
- Cielo in Comodoro Rivadavia, Chubut
- Ciudad UNM in Moreno, Buenos Aires
- de la azotea in Mar del Plata, Buenos Aires
- Fahrenheit in Rosario, Santa Fe
- Fleming in Salta
- LRR300 Empedrado in Empedrado, Corrientes
- La Tribu in Buenos Aires
- Manantial in Buenos Aires
- Mix in Santa Fe de la Vera Cruz, Santa Fe
- Puerto in Seguí, Entre Rios
- Radio María in Lobos, Buenos Aires
- Radio María in Tres Arroyos, Buenos Aires
- Radio María in Villa Celina, Buenos Aires
- Radio Maria in Cerro Ancasti, Catamarca
- Radio María in Luque, Córdoba
- Radio Maria in Puerto Iguazú, Misiones
- Reves in Córdoba
- Sayhueque in Centenario, Neuquén
- Sensación in Lucas González, Entre Ríos
- Tierra in Rafaela, Santa Fe
- UNA in Paraná, Entre Ríos
- Wilde in Wilde, Buenos Aires

== Australia ==
- ACTTAB Radio in Canberra, Australian Capital Territory
- 2MWM in Sydney
- Triple J in Goulburn, New South Wales
- ABC Classic in Sunshine Coast, Queensland
- 5CST in Adelaide, South Australia
- 3BPH in Bendigo, Victoria
- EDM100 in Footscray, Victoria

== Canada (Channel 204) ==
- CHOC-FM in Portneuf, Quebec
- CBAF-FM-10 in New Glasgow, Nova Scotia
- CKAR-FM in Muskoka (Huntsville), Ontario
- CBNC-FM in Stephenville, Newfoundland and Labrador
- CBOF-FM-9 in Chapeau, Quebec - (Soon to be relocating to Pembroke, Ontario)
- CBV-FM-4 in St-Pamphile, Quebec
- CFTW-FM in Whistler, British Columbia
- CFUR-FM in Prince George, British Columbia
- CHIC-FM in Rouyn-Noranda, Quebec
- CHVI-FM in Campbell River, British Columbia
- CIMX-FM in Windsor, Ontario
- CKSB-FM-2 in Saskatoon, Saskatchewan
- CKUG-FM in Kugluktuk, Nunavut
- CKYL-FM-4 in Valleyview, Alberta
- CKYM-FM in Napanee, Ontario
- VF2190 in Slave Lake, Alberta
- VF2585 in Hobbema, Alberta
- VF7334 in Vancouver, British Columbia

== China ==
- CNR China Traffic Radio in Nanning
- CNR The Voice of China in Handan, Urumqi and Weifang
- CRI Hit FM in Beijing and Chengdu
- Qingyuan General Radio

== Malaysia ==
- Terengganu FM in Kuala Terengganu, Terengganu
- TraXX FM in Seremban, Negeri Sembilan

== Mexico ==
- XHBI-FM in Aguascalientes, Aguascalientes
- XHDAD-FM in La Piedad, Michoacán
- XHEX-FM in Culiacán (Bellavista), Sinaloa
- XHGDL-FM in Guadalajara, Jalisco
- XHITT-FM in Tijuana, Baja California
- XHJX-FM in Querétaro, Querétaro
- XHLUAD-FM in Gómez Palacio, Durango
- XHPECR-FM in Puerto Vallarta, Jalisco

== Philippines ==
- DWLD in Batangas City
- DWDW in Puerto Princesa
- DYKU in Iloilo City
- DYPC in Mandaue, Cebu
- DXGL in Butuan

== United Kingdom ==
- BBC Radio 2 in the United Kingdom

== United States (Channel 204) ==
- KAGU in Spokane, Washington
- KAJT in Ada, Oklahoma
- KAZI in Austin, Texas
- KBKV in Breckenridge, Colorado
- KBLV (FM) in Tehachapi, California
- KBMQ in Monroe, Louisiana
- KBOM in Socorro, New Mexico
- KBPU in De Queen, Arkansas
- KBVR in Corvallis, Oregon
- KCAM-FM in Glennallen, Alaska
- KCME in Manitou Springs, Colorado
- KDMB in Moses Lake, Washington
- KDMC-FM in Van Buren, Missouri
- KDNR in South Greeley, Wyoming
- KDRW in Santa Barbara, California
- KEPI in Eagle Pass, Texas
- KETP in Enterprise, Oregon
- KEZF in Grants, New Mexico
- KFBN in Fargo, North Dakota
- KFHM in Big Bear City, California
- KFOM in Stanton, Iowa
- KFXH in Marlow, Oklahoma
- KGNI in Gunnison, Colorado
- KGSF in Huntsville, Arkansas
- KHPH in Kailua, Hawaii
- KISL in Avalon, California
- KIYE in Kamiah, Idaho
- KJHA in Houston, Alaska
- KJHI in Haviland, Kansas
- KKER in Kerrville, Texas
- KLKM in Kalispell, Montana
- KLNE in Lexington, Nebraska
- KLNI in Decorah, Iowa
- KLOY in Ocean Park, Washington
- KLRK-FM in Yankton, South Dakota
- KLUY in Searcy, Arkansas
- KLVP in Sandy, Oregon
- KLVV in Ponca City, Oklahoma
- KLVW in West Odessa, Texas
- KMCU in Wichita Falls, Texas
- KMMK in Coggon, Iowa
- KMPO in Modesto, California
- KMSE in Rochester, Minnesota
- KNAU in Flagstaff, Arizona
- KOAP in Lakeview, Oregon
- KOAY (FM) in Middleton, Idaho
- KOKN in Oketo, Kansas
- KORB in Hopland, California
- KPLV in Corpus Christi, Texas
- KPPW in Williston, North Dakota
- KRBG in Hereford, Texas
- KRDF in Red Feather Lakes, Colorado
- KRFH in Marshalltown, Iowa
- KRTC in Truth or Consequences, New Mexico
- KRVS in Lafayette, Louisiana
- KRZA in Alamosa, Colorado
- KSDQ in Moberly, Missouri
- KSPC in Claremont, California
- KTCU in Fort Worth, Texas
- KTMU in Muenster, Texas
- KTQR in Forks, Washington
- KTRM in Kirksville, Missouri
- KUAO in North Ogden, Utah
- KUBO in Calexico, California
- KUDI in Choteau, Montana
- KUHF in Houston, Texas
- KUNR in Reno, Nevada
- KUST (FM) in Moab, Utah
- KUWK in Kaycee, Wyoming
- KVCH in Huron, South Dakota
- KVHI in Raymondville, Texas
- KVIT in Chandler, Arizona
- KVKR in Pine Ridge, South Dakota
- KWDM in West Des Moines, Iowa
- KWPR in Lund, Nevada
- KWTU in Tulsa, Oklahoma
- KXEH in Victor, Montana
- KXJS in Sutter, California
- KXMS in Joplin, Missouri
- KXNM in Encino, New Mexico
- KYSK in Ririe, Idaho
- KYSO in Selma, Oregon
- KZLO in Kilgore, Texas
- WAGO (FM) in Snow Hill, North Carolina
- WAGP in Beaufort, South Carolina
- WAYM in Spring Hill, Tennessee
- WBFO in Buffalo, New York
- WBHW in Loogootee, Indiana
- WBIJ in Saluda, South Carolina
- WBWV in Beckley, West Virginia
- WBYX in Stroudsburg, Pennsylvania
- WCDG in Dahlonega, Georgia
- WCGT in Clintonville, Pennsylvania
- WCSF in Joliet, Illinois
- WCYJ in Waynesburg, Pennsylvania
- WDLV in Fort Myers, Florida
- WEER in Montauk, New York
- WEGN in Kankakee, Illinois
- WEHA in Port Republic, New Jersey
- WELL-FM in Waverly, Alabama
- WERN in Madison, Wisconsin
- WEUC in Morganfield, Kentucky
- WEYY in Tallapoosa, Georgia
- WFNP in Rosendale, New York
- WFOS in Chesapeake, Virginia
- WGFW in Drakes Branch, Virginia
- WGKZ-LP in Quinnesec, Michigan
- WGVE in Gary, Indiana
- WHCL in Clinton, New York
- WHJM in Anna, Ohio
- WHPJ in Hibbing, Minnesota
- WIAA (FM) in Interlochen, Michigan
- WICR in Indianapolis, Indiana
- WIGH in Lexington, Tennessee
- WIQR in Lexington, Virginia
- WITM in West Frankfort, Illinois
- WJCU in University Heights, Ohio
- WJDS in Sparta, Georgia
- WJFR in Jacksonville, Florida
- WJLN in White Springs, Florida
- WJMF in Smithfield, Rhode Island
- WJZB in Starkville, Mississippi
- WKMW in Americus, Georgia
- WKNZ in Harrington, Delaware
- WLCU (FM) in Campbellsville, Kentucky
- WLHE in Cadiz, Kentucky
- WLUW in Chicago, Illinois
- WMLS in Grand Marais, Minnesota
- WMMT in Whitesburg, Kentucky
- WMOC in Lumber City, Georgia
- WMVY in Edgartown, Massachusetts
- WMYZ in The Villages, Florida
- WNCW in Spindale, North Carolina
- WNHU in West Haven, Connecticut
- WOBO in Batavia, Ohio
- WOFN in Beach City, Ohio
- WOTB in Pearl River, Louisiana
- WPCD in Champaign, Illinois
- WPJY in Blennerhassett, West Virginia
- WPRC in Sheffield, Illinois
- WPSC in Wayne, New Jersey
- WQKV in Warsaw, Indiana
- WQMN in Minocqua, Wisconsin
- WQOH-FM in Springville, Alabama
- WQPR in Muscle Shoals, Alabama
- WRAE in Raeford, North Carolina
- WREM in Canton, New York
- WRFW in River Falls, Wisconsin
- WRHU in Hempstead, New York
- WRHV in Poughkeepsie, New York
- WRSU in New Brunswick, New Jersey
- WRVT in Rutland, Vermont
- WRWA in Dothan, Alabama
- WRYV in Milroy, Pennsylvania
- WSIE in Edwardsville, Illinois
- WSIS (FM) in Riverside, Michigan
- WSQA in Hornell, New York
- WSRI in Sugar Grove, Illinois
- WSYC in Shippensburg, Pennsylvania
- WTMI in Fleming, New York
- WUFM in Columbus, Ohio
- WULV in Moundsville, West Virginia
- WUMV in Milford, New Hampshire
- WUSG-LP in Cambridge, Minnesota
- WVTX in Colchester, Vermont
- WWCF in McConnellsburg, Pennsylvania
- WWLU in Lincoln University, Pennsylvania
- WWQK in Oak Ridge, Tennessee
- WXDU in Durham, North Carolina
- WXJM in Harrisonburg, Virginia
- WXPH in Middletown, Pennsylvania
- WYBW in Key Colony Beach, Florida
- WYTF in Indianola, Mississippi
