= XHDK-FM =

Radio station in Guadalajara, Jalisco

Simulcast of XEZJ-AM 1480
- Tlaquepaque–Guadalajara, Jalisco; Mexico
- Frequency: 94.7 MHz
- Branding: KY

Programming
- Format: Urban

Ownership
- Owner: Grupo Radiorama; (Radio XHDK, S.A. de C.V.)
- Operator: Grupo Audiorama Comunicaciones
- Sister stations: XHGDA-FM, XHRX-FM, XHQJ-FM, XHOJ-FM, XEHK-AM, XEDK-AM, XEDKT-AM, XEPJ-AM, XEZJ-AM, XHVOZ-FM

History
- First air date: May 14, 1979 (concession)
- Call sign meaning: Derived from the DK stations, including XEDK-AM and XEDK-TV

Technical information
- Licensing authority: CRT
- Class: C1
- ERP: 29.95 kW
- HAAT: 316.2 meters (1,037 ft)
- Transmitter coordinates: 20°35′59.9″N 103°21′56.2″W

Links
- Webcast: Listen live
- Website: audiorama.mx

XHDK-FM is a radio station on 94.7 FM in Guadalajara. The station is operated by Audiorama, a related company to Radiorama, and is known as KY (pronounced like "calle") with an Urban format.

== History ==
XHDK received its first concession on May 14, 1979, and was owned by Radio VIP, S.A., concessionaire for the Serna family's Radio Programas de México. XHDK operated as part of Grupo DK, which included XEDK-AM, XEDKR-AM, XEDKT-AM and XEDK-TV. It was known as Estéreo Recuerdo in the early 1980s and changed its name to El Toque Mágico (The Magic Touch) in 1985 and 95 Tu FM in the early 1990s.

In the 1990s, the Serna family sold most of RPM to Grupo Radio Centro, including XEDKR, which was now operating as a repeater of Radio Red. In the late 1990s, Radiorama took over XHDK and XEDKT, and XHDK took on the names La Invasora, and Tequila FM; by 2002, Grupo Radio México was operating the station with Planeta. The 2015 partial merger of GRM into corporate cousin Grupo Radio Centro made XHDK a direct sister station to XEDKR again.

On September 3, 2020, Planeta moved to XHKB-FM 99.9, which at the time was owned directly by Radio Centro, unlike XHDK. After that, the station began broadcasting test programming with a Latin pop format, until September 14, 2020, the station formally launched as KY 94.7, a brand new urban music format.
