= List of radio stations in Querétaro =

This is a list of radio stations located in the state of Querétaro, Mexico, which can be sorted by their call signs, frequencies, location, ownership, names, and programming formats.

Radio stations in Querétaro
Call sign	Frequency	Location	Owner	Name	Format
XECPAF-AM	850 AM	Jalpan de Serra	Universidad Autónoma de Querétaro	Radio Universidad	University
XECPAC-AM	1200 AM	Jalpan de Serra	Government of the State of Querétaro	Radio Querétaro	Public radio
XECCBY-AM	1250 AM	Santiago de Querétaro	NTR Medios de Comunicación, S.A. de C.V.	—N/a	—N/a
XEQRMD-AM	1310 AM	Santiago de Querétaro	Medios Digitales RMX, S.A. de C.V.	W Radio	News/talk
XHJX-FM	88.7 FM	Santiago de Querétaro	Transmisora Regional Radio Fórmula, S.A. de C.V.	Radio Fórmula	News/talk
XHUAQ-FM	89.5 FM	Santiago de Querétaro	Universidad Autónoma de Querétaro	Radio Universidad	University
XHTQS-FM	89.9 FM	Tequisquiapan	Radio Procultura, A.C.	Canal 98 La Máquina del Sonido	English classic hits
XHQRT-FM	90.9 FM	Santiago de Querétaro	Radiodifusora Querétaro, S.A. de C.V.	91 DAT	Contemporary hit radio
XHKH-FM	91.7 FM	Santiago de Querétaro	Impulsora Radiofónica de la Industria y el Comercio, S.A. de C.V.	Top Music	Contemporary hit radio
XHPCMQ-FM	92.3 FM	Cadereyta de Montes	Ultradigital Puebla, S.A. de C.V.	La Kebuena	Regional Mexican
XHXE-FM	92.7 FM	Santiago de Querétaro	Radio XEXE, S.A. de C.V.	La Mejor	Regional Mexican
XHPBJR-FM	93.1 FM	San Juan del Río	Radio de Ayuda, A.C.	Super Stereo Miled	News/talk
XHCCBL-FM	93.5 FM	Cadereyta de Montes	Radio Cañón, S.A. de C.V.	La Q 93.5 - Pura Musica	Spanish adult hits
XHHY-FM	93.9 FM	Santiago de Querétaro	Foro Radial, S.A. de C.V.	Mia 93.9	Romantic
XHOZ-FM	94.7 FM	Santiago de Querétaro	GIM Televisión Nacional, S.A. de C.V.	Imagen Radio	News/talk
XHOE-FM	95.5 FM	Santiago de Querétaro	Estereomundo de Querétaro, S.A. de C.V.	Exa FM	Contemporary hit radio
XHSCAR-FM	95.9 FM	Cadereyta de Montes	Radio KD, A.C.	Mi Radio 95.9	Regional Mexican
XHRQ-FM	97.1 FM	San Juan del Río	XHRQ-FM, S.A. de C.V.	La Z	Regional Mexican
XHQTO-FM	97.9 FM	Santiago de Querétaro	Radio XHQTO, S. de R.L. de C.V.	Match	Contemporary hit radio
XHMQ-FM	98.7 FM	Santiago de Querétaro	XHMQ, S.A. de C.V.	La Jefa	Regional Mexican
XHVI-FM	99.1 FM	San Juan del Río	Multimedios en Radiodifusión Morales, S.A. de C.V.	Exa FM	Contemporary hit radio
XHQUE-FM	100.3 FM	Santiago de Querétaro	Government of the State of Querétaro	Radio Querétaro	Public radio
XHPMI-FM	100.7 FM	Peñamiller	Radio Cultural de Villa de Carbón, A.C.	Radiomiller	Community radio
XHJHS-FM	101.1 FM	Santiago de Querétaro	Radio XHJHS, S.A. de C.V.	Stereo Crystal	Romantic
XHPQUI-FM	102.7 FM	Tequisquiapan	Servicios de Cines y Espectáculos, S.A. de C.V.	K Digital	Romantic / Pop
XHPBPE-FM	103.1 FM	Pedro Escobedo	Radio de Ayuda, A.C.	Super Stereo Miled	News/talk
XHCSBW-FM	103.9 FM	Jalpan de Serra–Saldiveña	Raúl Alfredo Pinzón Galván	La Raza 103.9	News and tejano music
XHSJR-FM	104.1 FM	San Juan del Río	José Luis Chavero Reséndiz	Radio Uno	Variety
XHNAQ-FM	104.9 FM	Santiago de Querétaro	Radiodifusoras Capital, S.A. de C.V.	Lokura FM	Adult hits
XHGV-FM	106.5 FM	Santiago de Querétaro	Radio XHGV, S.A. de C.V.	Mix	English adult contemporary
XHJAQ-FM	107.1 FM	Jalpan de Serra	Edikam Comunicación, S.A. de C.V.	Ke Buena	Regional Mexican
XHQG-FM	107.9 FM	Santiago de Querétaro	Radio Cañón, S.A. de C.V.	W Radio	News/Talk
