= List of television stations in Jalisco =

The following is a list of all CRT-licensed over-the-air television stations broadcasting in the Mexican state of Jalisco. There are 30 television stations in Jalisco.

== List of television stations ==
RF	VC	Call sign	Location	Network/name	ERP	Concessionaire
36	2	XHATJ-TDT	Atotonilco El Alto	Las Estrellas	24 kW	Televimex
19	5	XHATU-TDT	Atotonilco El Alto	Canal 5	24 kW	Radio Televisión
32	2	XHANT-TDT	Autlán de Navarro	Las Estrellas (N+ Foro)	43 kW	Televimex
23	5	XHAUM-TDT	Autlán de Navarro	Canal 5	43 kW	Radio Televisión
33	1	XHJAL-TDT	Guadalajara	Azteca Uno (adn Noticias)	192.69 kW	Televisión Azteca
24	2	XHGA-TDT	Guadalajara	Las Estrellas (N+ Foro)	150 kW	Televimex
28	3	XHCTGD-TDT	Guadalajara	Imagen Televisión (Excélsior TV)	100 kW	Cadena Tres I, S.A. de C.V.
29	4	XHG-TDT	Guadalajara; Ciudad Guzmán	Televisa Regional (Másvisión)	150 kW; 15 kW	Televisora de Occidente
22	5	XHGUE-TDT	Guadalajara	Canal 5	150 kW	Radio Televisión
34	6	XHTDJA-TDT	Guadalajara	Canal 6 (Milenio Televisión, CGTN En Español, Popcorn Central)	200.009 kW	Televisión Digital
31	7	XHSFJ-TDT	Guadalajara; Arandas	Azteca 7 (a+)	193.13 kW; 14.24 kW	Televisión Azteca
26	9	XEWO-TDT	Guadalajara	Nu9ve	150 kW	Televisora de Occidente
9	10	XHQMGU-TDT	Guadalajara	Quiero TV (Quiero TV -2 horas, Inova)	50 kW	Quiero Media
23	11	XHPBGD-TDT	Guadalajara	Canal Once (Once Niñas y Niños)	124.996 kW	Instituto Politécnico Nacional
35	13	XEDK-TDT	Guadalajara	Canal 13 (TN23)	140 kW	Telsusa
20	14	XHSPRGA-TDT	Guadalajara	SPR multiplex (14.1 Canal Catorce, 20.1 TV UNAM, 22.1 Canal 22)	29.95 kW	Sistema Público de Radiodifusión del Estado Mexicano
25	17	XHCPEH-TDT	Guadalajara	Jalisco TV (Jalisco TV, Canal Parlamento)	135.55 kW	Gobierno del Estado de Jalisco
27	44	XHCPCT-TDT	Guadalajara	Canal 44 (44 Noticias)	205.5 kW	Universidad de Guadalajara
24	17	XHCPEG-TDT	Ciudad Guzmán	Jalisco TV	3.19 kW	Gobierno del Estado de Jalisco
11	44	XHPBGZ-TDT	Ciudad Guzmán	Canal 44	5.522 kW	Universidad de Guadalajara
25	2/5	XHLBU-TDT	La Barca	Las Estrellas (Canal 5)	22 kW	Televimex
9	44	XHPBLM-TDT	Lagos de Moreno	Canal 44 (44 Noticias)	3.13 kW	Universidad de Guadalajara
25	1	XHGJ-TDT	Puerto Vallarta	Azteca Uno (adn Noticias)	19.27 kW	Televisión Azteca
36	2	XHPVT-TDT	Puerto Vallarta	Las Estrellas	33 kW	Televimex
35	5	XHPVE-TDT	Puerto Vallarta	Canal 5 (Televisa Regional)	33 kW	Radio Televisión
23	7	XHPVJ-TDT	Puerto Vallarta	Azteca 7 (a+)	18.42 kW	Televisión Azteca
27	10	XHCPPV-TDT	Puerto Vallarta	TV Mar	90.072 kW	Compañía Periodística Sudcaliforniana
21	17	XHCPEI-TDT	Puerto Vallarta	Jalisco TV	23.37 kW	Gobierno del Estado de Jalisco
8	44	XHCPAF-TDT	Puerto Vallarta	Canal 44 (44 Noticias)	6.644 kW	Universidad de Guadalajara

== Notes ==
XHCSAE-TDT XHCSAE-TDT
