= XEDK-AM =

Radio station in Guadalajara, Jalisco

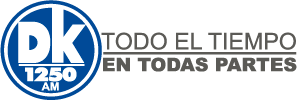
- Guadalajara; Mexico
- Frequency: 1250 kHz
- Branding: DK 1250

Programming
- Format: News/talk

Ownership
- Owner: Grupo Radiorama; (Radio XEDK, S.A. de C.V.)
- Sister stations: XHGDL-FM, XHQJ-FM, XHOJ-FM, XHRX-FM, XEHK-AM, XEDKT-AM, XEPJ-AM, XEZJ-AM

History
- First air date: 1938

Technical information
- Licensing authority: CRT
- Class: B
- Power: 10 kW day 1 kW night
- Transmitter coordinates: 20°38′30.7″N 103°20′24.7″W

Links
- Website: www.dk1250.mx

XEDK-AM is a radio station in Guadalajara. Located on 1250 kHz, XEDK-AM is owned by Grupo Radiorama and carries a news/talk format known as DK 1250.

== History ==
XEDK-AM came to air in Guadalajara on March 15, 1938. The station came to be owned by the Serna family and its Radio Programas de México.

In 1980, the owners of XEDK, who were also affiliated with Televisa, bought XEHL-TV channel 6 and rechristened it XEDK. That station, now owned by Televisa directly, is now on channel 5 but continues to bear the XEDK callsign.

There are also a trio of radio stations in Guadalajara whose callsigns begin with XEDK, as well as an XHDK-FM; most of these stations were at one point owned by businesses tied to Radio Programas de México, and one, XEDKT-AM 1340, is still a sister station to 1250 AM.
