= 1370 AM =

AM radio frequency

The following radio stations broadcast on AM frequency 1370 kHz: 1370 AM is a regional broadcast frequency, on which Class B and D stations broadcast.

== Argentina ==
- LRA 54 in Ingeniero Jacobacci, Rio Negro
- Trece 70 in Isidro Casanova, Buenos Aires
- Assigned frequency to Rafaela (Santa Fe). Still have no call sign assigned)

== Mexico ==
- XECCBI-AM in Huamantla, Tlaxcala
- XEHG-AM in Mexicali, Baja California
- XEPJ-AM in Guadalajara, Jalisco, licensed in San Pedro Tlaquepaque, Jalisco

== United States ==
Call sign	City of license	Facility ID	Class	Daytime power (kW)	Nighttime power (kW)	Transmitter coordinates
KAST	Astoria, Oregon	74433	B	1	1	46.175278°N 123.849444°W
KAWL	York, Nebraska	9932	D	0.5	0.176	40.842778°N 97.588056°W
KAWW	Heber Springs, Arkansas	48742	D	1		35.486111°N 92.034722°W
KCRV	Caruthersville, Missouri	53976	D	1	0.063	36.213889°N 89.690278°W
KDTH	Dubuque, Iowa	73662	B	5	5	42.485°N 90.644167°W
KFRO	Longview, Texas	70455	B	1	0.1	32.501944°N 94.703333°W
KGEN	Tulare, California	57446	D	0.71	0.072	36.204444°N 119.564722°W
KGNO	Dodge City, Kansas	37130	B	5	0.23	37.76°N 100.098056°W
KHXM	Pearl City, Hawaii	26441	B	0.25	0.25	21.438333°N 157.991389°W
KIOL	Iola, Kansas	29047	D	0.5	0.058	37.901944°N 95.407222°W
KJCE	Rollingwood, Texas	1243	B	5	0.5	30.304167°N 97.6475°W
KRAC	Red Bluff, California	54978	D	4	0.2	40.193611°N 122.215556°W
KSOP	South Salt Lake, Utah	35626	B	5	0.5	40.72°N 111.928333°W (daytime); 40.72°N 111.928056°W (nighttime)
KSUM	Fairmont, Minnesota	73656	B	1	1	43.629167°N 94.483333°W
KWNC	Quincy, Washington	29647	D	1	0.039	47.291667°N 119.852778°W
KWRM	Corona, California	39692	B	1.1	0.24	33.881111°N 117.5425°W
KWRT	Boonville, Missouri	5225	D	1	0.084	38.945556°N 92.770556°W
KWTL	Grand Forks, North Dakota	69201	B	12	0.27	47.883056°N 97.112778°W
KXTL	Butte, Montana	63871	B	1	1	46.005833°N 112.631667°W
KZSF	San Jose, California	68841	B	5	5	37.357778°N 121.871389°W
WBTN	Bennington, Vermont	9309	D	1	0.085	42.905278°N 73.208889°W
WCCN	Neillsville, Wisconsin	10027	D	5	0.042	44.571667°N 90.585556°W
WCOA	Pensacola, Florida	12142	B	5	4.4	30.449167°N 87.262778°W
WDEA	Ellsworth, Maine	17671	B	5	5	44.466667°N 68.469722°W
WDXE	Lawrenceburg, Tennessee	27421	D	1	0.025	35.256944°N 87.306667°W
WFDR	Manchester, Georgia	53678	D	2.3	0.028	32.887222°N 84.598333°W
WFEA	Manchester, New Hampshire	58543	B	5	5	42.907222°N 71.4625°W
WGCL	Bloomington, Indiana	59131	B	5	0.5	39.19°N 86.634444°W
WGHN	Grand Haven, Michigan	72104	D	0.5	0.022	43.038056°N 86.229444°W
WGIV	Pineville, North Carolina	22027	D	5	0.067	35.2125°N 80.868333°W
WGOH	Grayson, Kentucky	9210	D	5	0.021	38.328889°N 82.975833°W
WHEE	Martinsville, Virginia	51825	D	5		36.685833°N 79.903889°W
WIVV	Island of Vieques, Puerto Rico	8392	B	5	1	18.101667°N 65.470833°W
WJIP	Ellenville, New York	63528	D	5		41.738611°N 74.396667°W
WKMC	Roaring Spring, Pennsylvania	72315	D	5	0.038	40.323889°N 78.394444°W
WLID	Patchogue, New York	10136	D	0.5	0.102	40.753889°N 72.987222°W
WLJW	Cadillac, Michigan	73169	B	5	1	44.231667°N 85.4125°W
WLLM	Lincoln, Illinois	9963	D	1	0.035	40.14°N 89.386111°W
WLLN	Lillington, North Carolina	26151	D	5	0.049	35.387778°N 78.806111°W
WLOP	Jesup, Georgia	31095	D	5	0.035	31.601667°N 81.933333°W
WLOV	Washington, Georgia	51125	D	1		33.733889°N 82.719444°W
WLTH	Gary, Indiana	38402	D	1	0.009	41.571389°N 87.317222°W (daytime); 41.539444°N 87.3°W (nighttime)
WMGO	Canton, Mississippi	73259	D	1	0.028	32.626667°N 90.029722°W
WOCA	Ocala, Florida	57064	D	5	0.033	29.201111°N 82.151944°W
WPAZ	Pottstown, Pennsylvania	25002	D	1	0.052	40.276389°N 75.628889°W
WQEZ	Fort Campbell, Kentucky	61260	D	1	0.053	36.641111°N 87.433611°W
WQLL	Pikesville, Maryland	27691	B	50	24	39.439722°N 76.355556°W (daytime); 39.408056°N 76.775556°W (nighttime)
WRGS	Rogersville, Tennessee	73944	D	1	0.04	36.416111°N 82.984444°W
WSHV	South Hill, Virginia	50235	D	4.2	0.41	36.744167°N 78.161667°W
WSPD	Toledo, Ohio	62187	B	5	5	41.600833°N 83.536389°W
WTKY	Tompkinsville, Kentucky	72294	D	2.1		36.724167°N 85.681389°W
WVLY	Moundsville, West Virginia	53369	D	5	0.02	39.905556°N 80.778333°W
WVMR	Frost, West Virginia	52867	D	5		38.290278°N 79.931111°W
WWCB	Corry, Pennsylvania	13967	D	1	0.014	41.936111°N 79.655556°W
WXCT	Chattanooga, Tennessee	57845	B	5	5	35.040556°N 85.339444°W
WXXI	Rochester, New York	74220	B	5	5	43.100278°N 77.573056°W
WZTA	Vero Beach, Florida	41067	D	1	0.074	27.600278°N 80.3925°W

== Uruguay ==
- CX 42 Emisora Ciudad de Montevideo
