= XEDKT-AM =

Radio station in Guadalajara, Jalisco

- Guadalajara, Jalisco; Mexico
- Frequency: 1340 kHz
- Branding: Frecuencia Deportiva

Programming
- Format: Sports

Ownership
- Owner: Grupo Radiorama; (XEDKT-AM, S.A. de C.V.)
- Sister stations: XHGDL-FM, XHQJ-FM, XHOJ-FM, XHRX-FM, XEHK-AM, XEDK-AM, XEPJ-AM, XEZJ-AM

History
- First air date: December 28, 1942 (concession)
- Call sign meaning: Grupo DK T

Technical information
- Licensing authority: CRT
- Class: B
- Power: 5,000 watts day/1,000 watts night
- Transmitter coordinates: 20°38′30.7″N 103°20′24.7″W

Links
- Webcast: radiorama.mx/..
- Website: frecuenciadeportiva1340am.com

XEDKT-AM is a radio station on 1340 AM in Guadalajara, Jalisco. It is owned by Grupo Radiorama and carries a sports format known as Frecuencia Deportiva.

== History ==
After testing beginning in 1938, XELW-AM received its concession on December 28, 1942. It was owned by Salvador Galindo de la Torre. When Radio Programas de México bought XELW in 1964, it became XEDKT-AM, part of its series of Grupo DK radio stations. Radiorama bought XEDKT in 1993.

In 2017, XEDKT and XEPJ-AM 1370 swapped formats. XEDKT picked up the Frecuencia Deportiva sports format, while the long-running Radio Ranchito Regional Mexican format moved to 1370.
