= 960 AM =

AM radio frequency

The following radio stations broadcast on AM frequency 960 kHz: The U.S. Federal Communications Commission (FCC) classifies 960 AM as a regional frequency.

== In Argentina ==
- LRA6 in Mendoza

== In Canada ==
- CKNT in Mississauga, Ontario. Branded as “Sauga 960 AM”. Broadcasts 700W daytime / 104W nighttime, transmitter located at 43.648333°N 79.682222°W

== In Mexico ==
- XEHK-AM in Guadalajara, Jalisco
- XEK-AM in Nuevo Laredo, Tamualipas
- XETPH-AM in Santa María Ocotán, Durango
- XEOZ-AM in Xalapa, Veracruz

== In the United States ==
| Call sign | City of license | Facility ID | Class | Daytime power (kW) | Nighttime power (kW) | Unlimited power (kW) | Transmitter coordinates |
|---|---|---|---|---|---|---|---|
| KABN | Kenai, Alaska | 160572 | B | 1 | 1 | | 60.340120°N 151.075880°W |
| KALE | Richland, Washington | 63359 | B | 5 | 1 | | 46.242778°N 119.178056°W |
| KFLN | Baker, Montana | 48734 | D | 5 | 0.091 | | 46.375278°N 104.273611°W |
| KGKL | San Angelo, Texas | 34464 | D | 5 | 0.116 | | 31.494444°N 100.414444°W |
| KGWA | Enid, Oklahoma | 25899 | B | | | 1 | 36.436944°N 97.921111°W |
| KIMP | Mount Pleasant, Texas | 29915 | D | 1 | 0.075 | | 33.165°N 95.0075°W |
| KIXW | Apple Valley, California | 4 | D | 5 | 0.02 | | 34.516667°N 117.226389°W |
| KKNT | Phoenix, Arizona | 13508 | B | 5 | 5 | | 33.692778°N 112.0025°W |
| KLAD | Klamath Falls, Oregon | 3408 | D | 5 | 0.026 | | 42.1625°N 121.650278°W |
| KLTF | Little Falls, Minnesota | 37780 | D | 5 | 0.038 | | 46.004444°N 94.328333°W |
| KMA | Shenandoah, Iowa | 35107 | B | 5 | 5 | | 40.78°N 95.356389°W |
| KNDN | Farmington, New Mexico | 4040 | D | 5 | 0.163 | | 36.73°N 108.229722°W |
| KNEB | Scottsbluff, Nebraska | 51463 | B | 5 | 0.35 | | 41.791667°N 103.641389°W |
| KNEW | Oakland, California | 59957 | B | | | 5 | 37.827778°N 122.314722°W |
| KOVO | Provo, Utah | 65665 | D | 5 | 0.14 | | 40.206111°N 111.669722°W |
| KROF | Abbeville, Louisiana | 275 | D | 1 | 0.095 | | 30.011111°N 92.1225°W |
| KSRA | Salmon, Idaho | 71527 | D | 1 | 0.056 | | 45.183889°N 113.87°W |
| KZIM | Cape Girardeau, Missouri | 74582 | B | 5 | 0.5 | | 37.316389°N 89.485°W |
| WABG | Greenwood, Mississippi | 25238 | B | 1 | 0.5 | | 33.555°N 90.205556°W |
| WATS | Sayre, Pennsylvania | 71104 | D | 5 | 0.05 | | 41.996667°N 76.500833°W |
| WBMC | McMinnville, Tennessee | 14734 | D | 0.5 | 0.038 | | 35.666667°N 85.776389°W |
| WCRU | Dallas, North Carolina | 8503 | B | 10 | 0.5 | | 35.300833°N 81.170278°W |
| WDLM | East Moline, Illinois | 66005 | D | 0.52 | 0.02 | | 41.415833°N 90.398333°W |
| WDNO | Quebradillas, Puerto Rico | 11620 | B | 1 | 1 | | 18.419167°N 66.893889°W |
| WEAV | Plattsburgh, New York | 52806 | B | 5 | 5 | | 44.574167°N 73.448333°W |
| WELI | New Haven, Connecticut | 11933 | B | 5 | 5 | | 41.370556°N 72.9375°W |
| WERC | Birmingham, Alabama | 2112 | B | 5 | 5 | | 33.533889°N 86.851944°W |
| WFGL | Fitchburg, Massachusetts | 8418 | B | 2.5 | 1 | | 42.59°N 71.828611°W |
| WFIR | Roanoke, Virginia | 31138 | B | 10 | 5 | | 37.3025°N 80.040278°W (daytime); 37.255278°N 79.959444°W (nighttime) |
| WHAK | Rogers City, Michigan | 29286 | D | 5 | 0.136 | | 45.398056°N 83.921944°W |
| WHYL | Carlisle, Pennsylvania | 74556 | D | 5 | 0.022 | | 40.192778°N 77.174444°W |
| WJYZ | Albany, Georgia | 6617 | B | 5 | 0.39 | | 31.618056°N 84.175278°W |
| WKVX | Wooster, Ohio | 74202 | D | 1 | 0.032 | | 40.791944°N 81.904722°W |
| WLPR | Prichard, Alabama | 24454 | D | 6 | 0.032 | | 30.763889°N 88.11°W |
| WPRT | Prestonsburg, Kentucky | 18548 | D | 3.8 | 0.013 | | 37.646111°N 82.796111°W |
| WQLA | La Follette, Tennessee | 36231 | D | 1 | 0.033 | | 36.367222°N 84.147222°W |
| WRFC | Athens, Georgia | 1218 | B | 5 | 2.5 | | 33.999444°N 83.433333°W |
| WRNS | Kinston, North Carolina | 36944 | B | 5 | 1 | | 35.2825°N 77.6525°W |
| WSBT | South Bend, Indiana | 73985 | B | 5 | 5 | | 41.616667°N 86.216944°W |
| WSVU | North Palm Beach, Florida | 129188 | B | 2.4 | 1.4 | | 26.816944°N 80.251944°W |
| WTCH | Shawano, Wisconsin | 72154 | B | 1 | 1 | | 44.780833°N 88.631111°W |
| WTGM | Salisbury, Maryland | 28165 | B | 5 | 5 | | 38.428889°N 75.623889°W |
