= XHGDA-FM =

Radio station in Guadalajara, Jalisco, Mexico

Simulcast with XEHK-AM 960
- Guadalajara, Jalisco; Mexico
- Frequency: 89.1 FM (HD Radio)
- Branding: La Bestia Grupera

Programming
- Format: Regional Mexican

Ownership
- Owner: Grupo Audiorama Comunicaciones; (Medios de Información de Occidente, S.A. de C.V.)
- Sister stations: XHDK-FM, XHVOZ-FM, XEHK-AM, XEZJ-AM

History
- First air date: 1990
- Call sign meaning: "Guadalajara"

Technical information
- Licensing authority: CRT
- Class: B
- ERP: 50.03 kW
- HAAT: 88.4 m (290 ft)
- Transmitter coordinates: 20°38′33.7″N 103°15′54.6″W

Links
- Webcast: Listen live
- Website: audiorama.mx

XHGDA-FM (89.1 MHz) is a radio station in Guadalajara, Jalisco. It is owned by Grupo Audiorama Comunicaciones and carries a Regional Mexican format known as La Bestia Grupera.

== History ==
Víctor Manuel Moreno Torres received the concession for XHGDA-FM on September 10, 1990. In 2005, the station was sold to Medios de Información de Occidente, a concessionaire owned in part by Carlos Quiñones, founder of Radio S.A. Under his management, Radio S.A. operated XHGDA with its Máxima pop format. In 2008, ownership of XHGDA was passed to Grupo Radiorama.

In 2011, the station was leased to Grupo Multimedios, which placed its Milenio Radio format on the station. XHGDA was the first radio station in Guadalajara for Multimedios. In 2017, XHGDA returned to its original Audiorama operations with La Bestia Grupera, and Milenio Radio Jalisco became online-only. The station was also relocated to a new Radiorama transmission facility in San Miguel in the municipality of Zapopan.
