= KWRS =

KWRS may refer to:

- KWRS-LP, a low-power radio station (107.3 FM) licensed to serve Redlands, California, United States
- Whitworth Radio, an online-only radio station that held the call sign KWRS until 2009
