= XHOJ-FM =

Radio station in Guadalajara, Jalisco, Mexico

- Guadalajara, Jalisco (Cerro Grande Santa Fe); Mexico
- Frequency: 106.7 MHz
- Branding: Máxima 106.7 FM

Programming
- Format: Rock

Ownership
- Owner: Grupo Radiorama; (XHOJ-FM, S.A. de C.V.)
- Sister stations: XHGDL-FM, XHQJ-FM, XHRX-FM, XEHK-AM, XEDK-AM, XEDKT-AM, XEPJ-AM, XEZJ-AM

History
- First air date: August 25, 1993 (concession)
- Call sign meaning: Original planned station location of Ocotlán, Jalisco

Technical information
- Licensing authority: CRT
- Class: C
- ERP: 30 kW
- HAAT: 690.47 meters (2,265.3 ft)
- Transmitter coordinates: 20°29′27.25″N 103°2′23.36″W

Links
- Website: maxima1067.fm

XHOJ-FM is a radio station on 106.7 FM in Guadalajara, Jalisco, Mexico, broadcasting from Cerro Grande Santa Fe. The station is owned by Grupo Radiorama and carries a rock format known as Máxima 106.7.

== History ==
XHOJ received its first concession on August 25, 1993. The original concessionaire was Anáhuac Radio, S.A., and it initially broadcast as Estéreo Vida with contemporary music in Spanish. In 2011, it was decided to relocate Máxima FM, which had broadcast on XHGDA-FM 89.1.
