= XHVI-FM =

Radio station in San Juan del Río, Querétaro, Mexico

San Juan del Río, Querétaro; Mexico
- Frequency: 99.1 MHz
- Branding: Exa FM

Programming
- Format: Contemporary hit radio
- Affiliations: MVS Radio

Ownership
- Owner: Multimedios en Radiodifusión Morales, S.A. de C.V.

History
- First air date: January 29, 1962 (AM); 1994 (FM)
- Former call signs: XEVI-AM
- Former frequencies: 1310 kHz, 1400 kHz

Technical information
- Class: B1
- ERP: 25 kW
- HAAT: 47.94 m
- Transmitter coordinates: 20°21′06.7″N 99°57′48.1″W (main) 20°23′9.98″N 100°0′0.72″W (aux)

Links
- Webcast: Listen live
- Website: exafm.com

XHVI-FM is a radio station on 99.1 FM in San Juan del Río, Querétaro, Mexico. It carries the national Exa FM format from MVS Radio.

== History ==
XEVI-AM began broadcasting on 1310 kHz in 1962 as the first radio station to be based in San Juan del Río. Initially known as "La Estación del Pueblo", it was owned by General Ramón Rodríguez Familiar, the governor of Querétaro from 1935 to 1939 and founder of Querétaro radio stations XEJX (now XHJX-FM) and XENA (now XHNAQ-FM) and founded by Enrique Morales García. By the late 1960s, XEVI had moved to 1400.

In the 1990s, the station came under the control of Martha Resendiz Osejo and transitioned into an FM combo; it was later transferred to the current concessionaire, a business of the Morales Resendiz family, in 2009.

On October 3, 2017, XEVI formally surrendered its AM frequency, becoming an FM-only station.
