= XHGDL-FM =

Radio station in Guadalajara, Jalisco, Mexico

- Guadalajara, Jalisco; Mexico
- Frequency: 88.7 FM (HD Radio)
- Branding: @FM (Arroba FM)

Programming
- Format: English and Spanish contemporary hit radio

Ownership
- Owner: Rubén Hernández Campos
- Operator: Grupo Radiorama
- Sister stations: XHRX-FM, XHQJ-FM, XHOJ-FM, XEHK-AM, XEDK-AM, XEDKT-AM, XEPJ-AM, XEZJ-AM

History
- First air date: August 5, 1995 (AM); May 1, 2018 (FM)
- Former call signs: XEGDL-AM (1995–2020)
- Former frequencies: 730 kHz (1995–2020)
- Call sign meaning: GDL is a common abbreviation for Guadalajara

Technical information
- Licensing authority: CRT
- Class: A
- ERP: 3 kW
- HAAT: 45.4 m (149 ft)
- Transmitter coordinates: 20°40′51.2″N 103°21′34.1″W

Links
- Webcast: Listen live
- Website: arroba.fm arroba887.com

XHGDL-FM is a radio station on 88.7 FM in Guadalajara, Jalisco, Mexico. It is operated by Grupo Radiorama and carries its @FM contemporary hit radio format.

== History ==
Despite receiving its concession on October 28, 1994 and signing on August 5, 1995, XEGDL has roots stretching to 1958, when Rodolfo Navarro Palomares was authorized to build XENP-AM 1320 in Ocotlán. XENP never made it to air, and by the time a concession was issued, the station was on 730 kHz in Guadalajara with its current callsign and owned by Hernández Campos.

In 2017, operation of XEGDL was taken over by Radiorama and the Arroba pop format was installed on the station, replacing its La Explosiva grupera format. On May 1, 2018, as part of second-wave AM-FM migration, XHGDL-FM 88.7 signed on the air.
