= UAQ =

UAQ may stand for:

- Emirate of Umm al-Quwain, one of the emirates in the United Arab Emirates.
- Umm al-Quwain, the emirate's capital.
- Universidad Autónoma de Querétaro, the Spanish name of the Autonomous University of Queretaro (Mexico).
- the IATA Code for Domingo Faustino Sarmiento Airport, serving San Juan, Argentina
