= XEHK-AM =

Radio station in Guadalajara, Jalisco, Mexico

Simulcast of XHGDA-FM 89.1
- Guadalajara, Jalisco; Mexico
- Frequency: 960 AM
- Branding: La Bestia Grupera

Programming
- Format: Regional Mexican

Ownership
- Owner: Grupo Radiorama; (Frecuencia Radiofónica de Occidente, S.A. de C.V.)
- Operator: Grupo Audiorama Comunicaciones
- Sister stations: XHGDL-FM, XHDK-FM, XHVOZ-FM, XHQJ-FM, XHOJ-FM, XHRX-FM, XEPJ-AM, XEDK-AM, XEDKT-AM, XEZJ-AM

History
- First air date: June 17, 1941 (concession)

Technical information
- Licensing authority: CRT
- Class: B
- Power: 10,000 watts day/2,500 watts night
- Transmitter coordinates: 20°38′33.6″N 103°15′54.6″W

Links
- Webcast: Listen live
- Website: audiorama.mx

XEHK-AM is a radio station on 960 AM in Guadalajara, Jalisco. It is owned by Grupo Radiorama, currently a repeater of XHGDA-FM, but for more than 70 years it was the most prestigious station in Guadalajara. It carries a Regional Mexican format known as La Bestia Grupera.

== History ==
XEHK received its concession on June 29, 1939 and signed on the next year. It was owned by Carmen Villaseñor until 1945, when it was bought by Francisco E. Fregoso.

As of March 21, 2026, after 87 uninterrupted years of broadcasting, La Voz de Guadalajara was taken off the air, with Grupo Audiorama Comunicaciones taking control of the station and rebroadcasting the XHGDA-FM signal.
