= XHMQ-FM =

Radio station in Querétaro

- Querétaro, Querétaro; Mexico
- Broadcast area: Querétaro, Querétaro
- Frequency: 98.7 FM
- Branding: La Jefa 98.7

Programming
- Format: Regional Mexican

Ownership
- Owner: Respuesta Radiofónica; (XHMQ, S.A. de C.V.)

History
- First air date: August 25, 1987 (concession)

Technical information
- Class: B
- ERP: 38.96 kW
- HAAT: 75.61 meters (248.1 ft)
- Transmitter coordinates: 20°40′20.6″N 100°20′37.8″W

Links
- Website: www.lajefarr.mx

XHMQ-FM is a radio station on 98.7 FM in Querétaro, Querétaro. The station is owned by Respuesta Radiofónica and carries a Regional Mexican format known as La Jefa.

== History ==
XHMQ began with a concession awarded to Voz y Música, S.A., in 1987. It was originally owned by Radiorama. On April 20, 1999, Respuesta Radiofónica took over XHMQ and launched a Spanish-language contemporary music format under the name "Stereo Joya". On July 5, 2004, XHMQ flipped to pop music as a franchise of Los 40 Principales, while the Stereo Joya name was moved to XEHY-AM 1310. On November 15, 2006, the station switched to Regional Mexican music as Ke Buena. After nearly nine years, it dropped that franchise and rebranded as La Jefa on October 24, 2015.
