= XHPBQR-TDT =

University TV station in Querétaro, Querétaro, Mexico

Querétaro, Querétaro; Mexico
- Channels: Digital: 11 (VHF); Virtual: 24
- Branding: TV UAQ

Ownership
- Owner: Universidad Autónoma de Querétaro
- Sister stations: XHUAQ-FM

History
- First air date: December 11, 2017
- Call sign meaning: PABF Querétaro

Technical information
- Licensing authority: CRT
- ERP: 14.998 kW
- HAAT: 310.8 m (1,020 ft)
- Transmitter coordinates: 20°31′45″N 100°21′42″W

Links
- Website: tv.uaq.mx

XHPBQR-TDT is a television station on virtual channel 24 (physical channel 11) in Querétaro, Querétaro. It is operated by the Universidad Autónoma de Querétaro and transmits from the SPR tower on Cerro El Cimatario.

== History ==
XHPBQR was awarded to the university in March 2017 and began testing on December 1, with full programming beginning on the 11th of the month. It currently broadcasts from 7am to 12am daily.

Programming is planned to include newscasts covering university events, as well as programs produced by the university's academic units, learning and teaching programs.
