= XEPJ-AM =

Radio station in Guadalajara, Jalisco

- San Pedro Tlaquepaque, Jalisco; Mexico
- Frequency: 1370 AM
- Branding: Apostolicus

Programming
- Format: Catholic radio

Ownership
- Owner: Grupo Radiorama; (XEPJ de Guadalajara, S.A. de C.V.)
- Sister stations: XHGDL-FM, XHQJ-FM, XHOJ-FM, XHRX-FM, XEHK-AM, XEDK-AM, XEDKT-AM, XEZJ-AM

History
- First air date: May 15, 1964 (concession)

Technical information
- Licensing authority: CRT
- Class: B
- Power: 10,000 watts day/1,000 watts night
- Transmitter coordinates: 20°39′58.96″N 103°21′16.62″W

Links
- Webcast: Listen live
- Website: radioranchito1370am.com

XEPJ-AM is a radio station on 1370 AM in San Pedro Tlaquepaque, Jalisco, Mexico. It is owned by Grupo Radiorama and carries a Catholic religious format known as Apostolicus.

== History ==
XEPJ received its concession on May 15, 1964. It was owned by José de Jesús Cortés y Barbosa and broadcast with 500 watts. XEPJ affiliated to Grupo ACIR; it later picked up the "Radio Capital" rock format and was even sold to ACIR, doing business as Radio Capital, S.A. in 1981.

ACIR shed this station when it sold dozens of stations across the country to Radiorama.

In 2017, XEPJ and XEDKT-AM 1340 swapped formats. XEDKT picked up the Frecuencia Deportiva sports format previously on XEPJ, while the long-running Radio Ranchito Regional Mexican format from XEDKT moved to 1370.

On June 3, 2024, Radio Ranchito came to an end after 50 years of history, replaced by Apostolicus, a new Catholic radio format operated in conjunction with the Archdiocese of Guadalajara.
