= XHVOZ-FM =

Radio station in Guadalajara, Jalisco

- Guadalajara, Jalisco; Mexico
- Frequency: 107.5 FM
- Branding: RMX

Programming
- Format: Alternative rock

Ownership
- Owner: Grupo Audiorama Comunicaciones; (Radio VOZ de Guadalajara, S.A. de C.V.)
- Operator: Grupo Imagen
- Sister stations: XHGDA-FM, XHDK-FM, XEHK-AM, XEZJ-AM, XHSC-FM

History
- First air date: October 2, 1979 (concession)
- Call sign meaning: Estéreo "Voz" was the original name of the station when signed on

Technical information
- Licensing authority: CRT
- Class: B1
- ERP: 23.87 kW
- HAAT: 60.14 meters (197.3 ft)
- Transmitter coordinates: 20°40′35.31″N 103°22′58.26″W

Links
- Webcast: Listen live
- Website: www.rmx.com.mx

XHVOZ-FM is a radio station on 107.5 FM in Guadalajara, Jalisco. The station is owned Grupo Audiorama and operated by Grupo Imagen and carries an Alternative music format named "RMX".

== History ==
XHVOZ received its first concession on October 2, 1979. It was owned by Radiodifusoras y Televisoras del Noreste, S.A. de C.V., and initially operated by Promomedios. Its assigned call sign, never used, was XHGR-FM.

In 2015, Organización PRAM was replaced by Radio Emisora XHSP-FM as the concessionaire as part of a restructuring of the stations then owned by Grupo Radio México. GRM merged with corporate cousin Grupo Radio Centro in 2016.

Grupo Audiorama Comunicaciones took control of XHVOZ-FM on November 1, 2021. After two days of looping songs, the station flipped to electronic music as Vibe FM on November 3. The format was dropped on July 28, 2024; after a transition period, the station relaunched as Retro with an adult contemporary format.

In August 17, 2026, XHVOZ dropped the English-language classic hits format "Retro FM" and temporarily adopted as "107.5 FM", with alternative music format. It was then announced that the station will flip to the alternative "RMX" format that was heard on XHAV-FM 100.3 FM from 2006 to 2019. On August 30 at 11:23 AM, the RMX format arrived to 107.5 FM, after replaying the last shows aired on XHAV-FM before the format changed to Heraldo Radio on June 22, 2019.
