= XHRX-FM =

Radio station in Guadalajara, Jalisco

- Cerro Grande Santa Fe, Jalisco; Mexico
- Broadcast area: Guadalajara, Jalisco
- Frequency: 103.5 MHz
- Branding: La Tapatía

Programming
- Format: Regional Mexican

Ownership
- Owner: Grupo Radiorama; (XHRX-FM, S.A. de C.V.)
- Sister stations: XHOJ-FM, XHGDL-FM, XHQJ-FM, XEHK-AM, XEDK-AM, XEDKT-AM, XEPJ-AM, XEZJ-AM

History
- First air date: November 28, 1988 (concession)

Technical information
- Licensing authority: CRT
- Class: C
- ERP: 30 kW
- HAAT: 699 meters (2,293 ft)
- Transmitter coordinates: 20°29′26.5″N 103°02′25.5″W

Links
- Website: latapatia1035.fm

XHRX-FM is a radio station on 103.5 FM in Guadalajara, Jalisco, broadcasting from Cerro Grande Santa Fe. The station is owned by Grupo Radiorama and carries a Regional Mexican format known as La Tapatía.

== History ==
XHRX received its first concession on November 28, 1988. It was owned by Radio Unido, S.A., a Radiorama subsidiary, and originally located in Zapotlanejo.

Former logo
