= XHEX-FM =

Radio station in Culiacán, Sinaloa, Mexico

- Culiacán, Sinaloa; Mexico
- Frequency: 88.7 MHz
- Branding: Radio Fórmula

Programming
- Format: News/talk

Ownership
- Owner: Grupo Fórmula; (Transmisora Regional Radio Fórmula, S.A. de C.V.)

History
- First air date: May 2, 1963 (concession)

Technical information
- Licensing authority: CRT
- Class: B1
- ERP: 25 kW
- HAAT: 66.64 m (218.6 ft)
- Transmitter coordinates: 24°48′53″N 107°27′22″W

Links
- Webcast: Listen live
- Website: radioformulaculiacan.com

XHEX-FM is a radio station on 88.7 FM in Culiacán, Sinaloa, Mexico. It is owned by Radio Fórmula and carries its news and talk programming.

== History ==
XEEX-AM received its concession on May 2, 1963. It was owned by Martín Larios León and operated with 250 watts on 1400 kHz from facilities in El Dorado. By the 1980s, XEEX had moved to Culiacán proper and ramped up power to 1,000 watts. It was sold to Radio XEEX in 1993—during which time it moved to 1230 kHz—and to Fórmula in 2000. The station also migrated to FM in 2010.
