= XEDK-TDT =

Television station in Guadalajara, Jalisco

- Guadalajara, Jalisco; Mexico
- Channels: Digital: 35 (UHF); Virtual: 13

Programming
- Affiliations: Canal 13

Ownership
- Owner: Albavisión; (Telsusa Televisión México, S.A. de C.V.)

History
- First air date: September 22, 1960
- Former call signs: XEHL-TV (1960–1980); XEDK-TV (1980–2016)
- Former channel numbers: Analog; 6 (VHF, 1960–1997); 5 (VHF, 1997–2016); Virtual; 9 (2016–2020); 8 (2020-2022)
- Call sign meaning: Taken from XEDK-AM

Technical information
- Licensing authority: CRT
- ERP: 140 kW
- HAAT: 345.1 m (1,132 ft)
- Transmitter coordinates: 20°35′58″N 103°21′52″W

XEDK-TDT is a television station in Guadalajara, Jalisco, broadcasting on virtual channel 13 (physical channel 35). Historically, XEDK was considered one of the most important local television stations in western Mexico; It forms part of the Telsusa Canal 13 network owned by Albavisión.

== History ==
=== XEHL-TV, Televisión Tapatía: 1960–80 ===
The history of XEDK-TV begins with the sign-on of XEHL-TV channel 6, which came to air on September 22, 1960. XEHL was owned by Televisión Tapatía, a local group backed by Guadalajara business owners. Only months earlier, XEWO-TV channel 2, the first Telesistema Mexicano station in Guadalajara, had taken to the air. XEHL was among the few television stations in Mexico not under TSM's control. The competition was lopsided: XEWO broadcast 11 hours of programming a day, while XEHL only had five and a half hours a day by late 1960. TSM not only had better programming and equipment to bring in Mexico City programs via a link at La Piedad, Michoacán, but it also gained a sister station, XHG-TV channel 4, in 1961. When TSM's duopoly took full force, it realigned its channels 2 and 4 so that the new channel 4 would run all of the Mexico City programs and channel 2 would remain local (this was later reversed). Much of XEHL's programming, in contrast, consisted of live studio shows.

In 1962, Walter Cross Buchanan, the Secretary of Communications and Transportation, declared that there was an opportunity to extend Mexican television's reach "from border to border and from coast to coast". Telesistema Mexicano quite clearly had the lead. It collaborated with the government on the development of a national microwave system, which proved key to the development of television in provincial Mexico. TSM brought its viewers the launch of Gordon Cooper into space and the funeral of John F. Kennedy. In 1963, TSM built a new microwave link on Cerro Gordo, near Tepatitlán, improving the quality of its Guadalajara–Mexico City connection. Advertisers flocked to the better TSM programming, and TSM even began ripping off program concepts from channel 6. In 1963 and 1964, the losses for Televisión Tapatía widened, and TT ultimately signed a contract under which Telesistema Mexicano would provide sales services and videotape equipment to XEHL. The move was crucial to channel 6's survival; its profits jumped 73.7 percent for 1965.

While TSM had provided critical aid to XEHL, channel 6 was still a competitor. November 9, 1967 saw channel 6 mount the first color transmissions by an interior Mexican television station; its signal fanned out over a radius of 100 kilometres (62 mi). That same year, TSM presented a live program from Guadalajara to Mexico City for the first time. Meanwhile, the Mexican television panorama was changing, with the entrance of Televisión Independiente de México in the Mexico City market.

In 1974, Televisión Tapatía once more separated from what was now known as Televisa, but the market had changed in the intervening decade. Three new television stations had opened in Guadalajara; XHGA-TV channel 9, originally TIM's Guadalajara station and later a repeater for Canal 5, XHSFJ-TV channel 11 carrying Televisión Cultural de México, and XHJAL-TV channel 13 with the Canal 13 state-owned network. XEHL resorted to studio shows, much like in the early 1960s, to stay afloat. In 1976, XEHL was the only independent television station in Mexico.

The competitive landscape proved unfruitful for Televisión Tapatía, and in 1980, XEHL waved the white flag. Channel 6 was sold to a group headed by Clemente Serna Martínez and his Radio Programas de México, which owned the Grupo DK portfolio of radio stations headed by XEDK-AM 1250 as well as several Mexico City radio stations and was on generally good terms with the Azcárraga family. RPM folded the television station into Grupo DK, and on October 23, 1980, channel 6 took a new call sign: XEDK-TV.

=== XEDK under Serna: 1980–1997 ===
Under the new ownership, XEDK-TV became "just another link in the television monopoly", ending its regional aspirations and aligning with Televisa. It carried sports programming, mostly from XHTV in Mexico City, as well as some local programming such as "Sixto", a blue puppet that hosted children's programming, and "87.8", a musical program that aired in the 1980s and 1990s and launched the careers of several local artists.

In the early 1990s, as the privatization of Imevisión was about to unfold, Serna formed Grupo Medcom as an umbrella company for his family's media ventures. The Grupo DK radio stations were sold off, most owned by Radiorama with XEDKR-AM being sold along with Radio Red to Grupo Radio Centro. Medcom engaged in an unfruitful bid to buy Imevisión, placing the highest bid but failing to win, and later attempted to enter the satellite television market (a venture known as TeleRed) and bought 70 percent of the flailing CBS TeleNoticias cable news network. The station took the on-air name of Súper 6 and acquired programming from Telemundo, among other sources.

=== Televisa repeater years: 1997–2020 ===
In 1997, XEDK moved from channel 6 to 5, in order to avoid increasing interference from FM radio stations. It also became a repeater of most of XHTV's programming, with local news known as "Antena Cinco". In April 2001, XEDK became a full-time repeater of channel 9 in Mexico City, today known as Nu9ve, with no local programming. In 2009, Corporación Tapatía de Televisión reported that its main source of income was payments made by Televisa to XEDK to broadcast the Mexico City station. The contract with Televisa ran through 2030.

XEDK shut off its analog signal on December 16, 2015, along with other Guadalajara stations; as a result of its carriage of Gala TV/Nu9ve, the station adopted virtual channel 9 in 2016.

=== Independence and owner changes ===
In 2020, Televisa opted to end its contract with Corporación Tapatía de Televisión and air Nu9ve programming on its own XEWO-TDT. XEDK-TDT ceased airing Nu9ve on October 1, 2020, at which time it began airing a loop advising viewers to watch for new programming. Virtual channel 9 went to XEWO-TDT two weeks later, moving XEDK-TDT to channel 8. The station began airing the programming of XHFAMX-TDT "La Octava" on October 29, 2020.

As of March 7, 2022, XEDK stopped from retransmitting to La Octava to broadcasting Canal 13. On April 20, the Instituto Federal de Telecomunicaciones approved the transfer of the concession to Telsusa Televisión México, S.A. of C.V.
