= KJNN-LP =

Holbrook, Arizona; United States
- Frequency: 94.3 MHz
- Branding: Radio 74

Programming
- Format: Christian
- Affiliations: Radio 74 Internationale

Ownership
- Owner: Holbrook Seventh-day Adventist Indian School; (Holbrook Adventist Educational Radio Corp.)

History
- First air date: 2006

Technical information
- Licensing authority: FCC
- Facility ID: 135598
- Class: L1
- ERP: 100 watts
- HAAT: -51.6 meters (-168 feet)
- Transmitter coordinates: 34°52′59″N 110°11′39″W

Links
- Public license information: LMS
- Website: www.kjnn.org

KJNN-LP (94.3 FM, "Radio 74") is an American low-power FM radio station licensed to serve the community of Holbrook, Arizona. The station is licensed to Holbrook Adventist Educational Radio Corp. and operated as a ministry of the Holbrook Seventh-day Adventist Indian School. It airs a Christian radio format including Christian music and Bible teaching programs. The station was assigned the KJNN-LP call letters by the Federal Communications Commission on April 28, 2004.

Logo used until early 2011.
