= XEZJ-AM =

Radio station in Guadalajara, Jalisco

Simulcast of XHDK-FM 94.7
- Guadalajara, Jalisco; Mexico
- Broadcast area: Guadalajara metropolitan area
- Frequency: 1480 AM
- Branding: KY

Programming
- Format: Urban

Ownership
- Owner: Grupo Radiorama; (XEZJ-AM, S.A. de C.V.)
- Operator: Grupo Audiorama Comunicaciones
- Sister stations: XHGDL-FM, XHQJ-FM, XHOJ-FM, XHRX-FM, XHDK-FM, XEHK-AM, XEDK-AM, XEDKT-AM, XEPJ-AM, XHVOZ-FM

History
- First air date: June 20, 1962 (concession)
- Call sign meaning: Zapopan Jalisco

Technical information
- Licensing authority: CRT
- Class: B
- Power: 20 kW day/1 kW night
- Transmitter coordinates: 20°38′33.7″N 103°15′54.6″W

Links
- Webcast: Listen live
- Website: audiorama.mx

XEZJ-AM is a radio station on 1480 AM in Guadalajara, Jalisco, Mexico. It is owned by Grupo Radiorama and operated by Grupo Audiorama, being the repeater of the XHDK-FM signal.

== History ==
XEZJ-AM received its concession on June 20, 1962. It was owned by Julio Romo Valdivia and based in Zapopan, with 250 watts of power. Carlos Fregoso Mendoza bought XEZJ in 1966, and power increased to 500 and later 1,000 watts. XEZJ-AM was known as Radio Selecciones in the late 1970s and early 1980s, Zona Juvenil in the 1980s, 14–80 in the late 1990s, sports-formatted Solo Fútbol from 2003 to 2006, and carried Radio Trece programs from 2006 to 2008.

Until 2006, XEZJ-AM broadcast from the Federalismo Norte AM transmitter used by XEBON-AM 1280.

In 2016, XEZJ-AM flipped from news/talk format "Ciudad 1480" to a motivational talk format known as "Simplemente Supérate", but in 2019, the station returned to the "1480" moniker. On February 15, 2021, the station changed names again, this time to "Rock and Pop", until March 1, 2026, the format "Rock and Pop" was dropped and returns to the name "1480" in an apparently transition period, until March 21, 2026, when the station went off the air and began retransmitting the XHDK-FM signal.
