= XHHY-FM =

Radio station in Querétaro, Querétaro, Mexico

- Querétaro, Querétaro; Mexico
- Frequency: 93.9 MHz
- Branding: Mía 93.9 FM

Programming
- Format: Pop

Ownership
- Owner: Respuesta Radiofónica; (Foro Radial, S.A. de C.V.)

History
- First air date: September 29, 1986 (concession); December 4, 2011 (FM)

Technical information
- Class: AA
- ERP: 6 kW
- HAAT: 9.47 meters (31.1 ft)
- Transmitter coordinates: 20°37′24.0″N 100°25′06.8″W

Links
- Website: miafm.mx

XHHY-FM is a radio station on 93.9 FM in Querétaro, Querétaro, Mexico. The station is owned by Respuesta Radiofónica and carries a pop format known as Mía 93.9.

== History ==
XHHY began as XEHY-AM 1310, located in Villa Corregidora and owned by Trigio Javier Pérez de Anda. Pérez de Anda was the president of Grupo Radiorama and the son of founder Javier Pérez de Anda. The station changed formats several times, mostly broadcasting Mexican music as La Poderosa and Mi Consentida, until the late 1990s, when it began broadcasting romantic music in Spanish under the name Romántica 1310.

On July 11, 1999, Respuesta Radiofónica took over operations and relaunched XEHY as 1310 La Jefa with a grupera format, which was maintained until July 4, 2004, when it became known as La Más Querida. This lasted just three months to make way for a relaunch as Estéreo Joya—a brand which had been used on XHMQ-FM 98.7.

On December 4, 2011, XHHY-FM 93.9 came to the air on FM and changed its name to Joya 93.9. In July 2012, the station flipped to pop as Mía 93.9. The concession was transferred to Foro Radial in 2015.
