= XHQMGU-TDT =

Television station in Guadalajara

- Guadalajara, Jalisco; Mexico
- Channels: Digital: 9 (VHF); Virtual: 10
- Branding: Quiero TV

Programming
- Affiliations: 10.1: Independent; for others, see § Subchannels

Ownership
- Owner: Grupo Hevi; (Quiero Media, S.A. de C.V.)

History
- First air date: May 2, 2018
- Call sign meaning: Quiero Media Guadalajara

Technical information
- Licensing authority: CRT
- ERP: 50.183 kW
- HAAT: 353.5 m (1,160 ft)
- Transmitter coordinates: 20°36′03″N 103°21′50″W

Links
- Website: quierotv.mx

XHQMGU-TDT (channel 10) is an independent television station in Guadalajara, Jalisco, Mexico. The station is owned by Quiero Media, S.A. de C.V. and known as Quiero TV.

== History ==
Ocho TV began cable telecasts in June 1994 on channel 8 of the Telecable de Zapopan system, which had previously been established by Héctor Vielma Valdivia. The first program was a World Cup show, Conexión Mundialista. The station was renamed Ocho TV in 2004, and it grew to gain coverage on several national cable systems beyond Guadalajara, particularly when Telecable de Zapopan was sold off in 2015.

Quiero Media, S.A. de C.V., won a television station (XHQMGU-TDT) was awarded in the IFT-6 TV station auction of 2017 and began program service on May 2, 2018. It had been testing through most of April. As XEWO-TDT claimed virtual channel 8 first, XHQMGU uses virtual channel 10.

On November 16, 2018, Ocho TV ceased operations in order to relaunch as Quiero TV with a revamped program lineup on January 3, 2019. During that time, only the station's newscasts were broadcast. The relaunch included an investment in new studio equipment and a deal with Caracol Televisión, Canal RCN and Canal 1 entertainment programming.

In 2023, Quiero TV expanding into the United States with a broadcasting agreement with Norsan Media, which has stations in Charlotte, North Carolina; Charleston, South Carolina; and Jacksonville, Florida.

== Subchannels ==
The station's signal is multiplexed:

Subchannels of XHQMGU-TDT
Channel	Res.	Short name	Programming
10.1	1080i	XHQMGU1	Quiero TV
10.2	480i	XHQMGU2	Quiero TV (2-hour delay) (4:3)
10.3	480i	XHQMGU3	Inova (infomercials) (4:3)

On June 6, 2018, the Federal Telecommunications Institute authorized XHQMGU to program and broadcast a second subchannel, also named Quiero TV, which carries a two-hour timeshift feed of the main channel. The authorization carried the Quiero TV name more than five months prior to the station's relaunch. A third subchannel of Inova infomercials was approved in August 2019.
