= XHK-FM =

Radio station in Nuevo Laredo, Tamaulipas, Mexico

- Nuevo Laredo, Tamaulipas; Mexico
- Frequencies: 960 kHz; 90.9 MHz (HD Radio)
- Branding: XEK La Estación Grande de Nuevo Laredo

Programming
- Format: Regional Mexican

Ownership
- Owner: Eduardo Villarreal Marroquín

History
- First air date: May 17, 1937 (AM); April 8, 2018 (FM)
- Former call signs: XEDF-AM (1937–1957)

Technical information
- Licensing authority: CRT
- Class: B (AM); A (FM)
- Power: 5,000 watts day 1,000 watts night (AM)
- ERP: 3,000 watts (FM)
- HAAT: 33.6 m (110 ft)
- Transmitter coordinates: 27°29′34.2″N 99°30′16.87″W

Links
- Webcast: http://popout.tunein.com/embed/player/s24510?partnerId=RadioTime
- Website: https://apps.apple.com/mx/app/xhk-90-9-fm/id1498148587

XEK-AM/XHK-FM is a radio station on 960 kHz and 90.9 MHz in Nuevo Laredo, Tamaulipas. It is known as La Grande and carries a Regional Mexican format.

== History ==
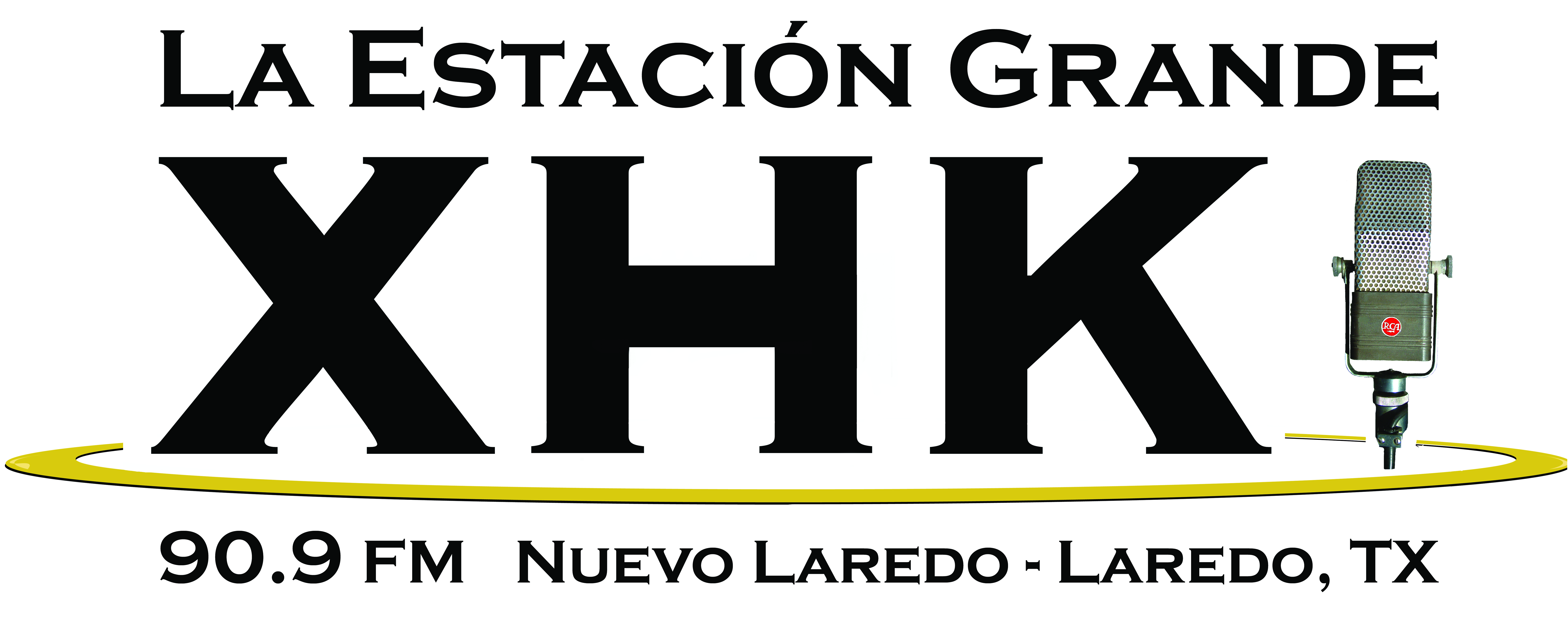
Last logo prior to Cortez family operation

XEDF-AM was founded on May 17, 1937, by Ruperto Villarreal, who was 18 years old. It was one of the first stations in Nuevo Laredo, originally broadcasting on 790 kHz.

In the 1950s, XEDF was moved to 960. It also engaged in a call sign swap with 970 AM in Mexico City, then XEK-AM. The Mexico City station desired the XEDF calls, assigned sequentially, as the DF was the abbreviation for the Federal District. As a result, on October 22, 1957, the Nuevo Laredo station took on the XEK-AM calls. At the end of its life, it operated with 5,000 watts.

XEK was approved for AM-FM migration in 2017 as part of a second wave of stations and signed on XHK-FM 90.9 on April 7, 2018. XEK-AM signed off April 7, 2019, after the required year of simulcasting. However, on June 5, 2019, the IFT unanimously declared a continuity obligation for XEK, which according to a 2018 study, left 59 people without any radio service when it signed off the air.

For decades, XEK/XHK was branded as La Estación Grande de Nuevo Laredo until December 1, 2019, when XHK became 90.9 La Raza, taking over the Regional Mexican format that had been on the Cortez family's XHBK-FM 95.7 and was supplied to that station under a five-year LMA with Latin Western Enterprises of Laredo. The station renamed itself La Grande shortly before the LMA was ended in mid-2024.
