= W17EY-D =

Television station in Charlotte, North Carolina

- Charlotte, North Carolina; United States
- Channels: Digital: 17 (UHF); Virtual: 16

Programming
- Affiliations: 16.1: Estrella TV; for others, see § Subchannels

Ownership
- Owner: Norsan Media; (Norsan Consulting and Management, LLC)

History
- First air date: March 1, 1985
- Former call signs: W68BL; W52CW; W16CF (2004–2013); WCEE-LP (2013–2015); WCEE-LD (2016–2026)
- Former affiliations: Subscription TV (March 1985); TBN (July 1985–2014); Silent (2014)

Technical information
- Licensing authority: FCC
- Facility ID: 67967
- Class: LD
- ERP: 15 kW
- HAAT: 187 m (614 ft)
- Transmitter coordinates: 35°15′7″N 80°41′11″W

Links
- Public license information: LMS

W17EY-D (channel 16) is a low-power television station in Charlotte, North Carolina, United States, affiliated with Estrella TV and owned by Norsan Media. The station broadcasts from studios on East Independence Boulevard and a transmitter near Reedy Creek Park in the Newell section of Charlotte.

== History ==
Satellite Entertainment Network, Inc., won the right to build low-power channel 68 in Charlotte in a lottery in May 1984. The win was a surprise to company president George Stein, who found out when a reporter contacted him seeking comment. On March 1, 1985, this station began broadcasting as W68BL on channel 68. It broadcast from an antenna atop Charlotte's First Union Plaza. W68BL offered Premiere, a subscription television service available with the rental of a decoder and a monthly subscription. It was a major bust and folded a month later, after a reported $1 million investment.

W68BL was out of service for three months until returning with programs from the Trinity Broadcasting Network (TBN). TBN simultaneously filed to acquire the license from Satellite Entertainment Network. The station moved in the late 1990s to channel 52 as W52CW and relocated again in 2004 to channel 16.

Regal Media purchased 36 TBN translators in 2012. Norsan Consulting and Management purchased W16CF from Regal Media in 2013 to add to its complement of Hispanic-oriented radio stations in the market. the station went back on the air on October 23, 2014, in digital as an affiliate of Estrella TV. It was the first Spanish-language TV station in Charlotte, joined in 2017 by a Telemundo subchannel of WSOC-TV.

Norsan's Estrella TV stations in Charlotte; Charleston, South Carolina; and Jacksonville, Florida, share an evening news program.

On February 23, 2026, an FCC rule change required stations licensed as broadcast translators and not low-power TV stations, including this one, to be assigned translator-type call signs. As a result, this station was changed to W17EY-D.

== Technical information ==
=== Subchannels ===
The station's signal is multiplexed:

Subchannels of W17EY-D
Channel	Res.	Short name	Programming
16.1	720p	WCEE-HD	Estrella TV
16.2	480p	WCEELD2	Quiero TV
16.3	480p	WCEELD3	Quiero Music

In 2023, Quiero TV and Quiero Music was added to new subchannels 16.2 and 16.3, respectively.
