= XHQJ-FM =

Radio station in Guadalajara, Jalisco

- Guadalajara; Mexico
- Frequency: 105.9 MHz
- Branding: Éxtasis Digital

Programming
- Format: Adult contemporary

Ownership
- Owner: Grupo Radiorama; (XHQJ-FM, S.A. de C.V.)
- Sister stations: XHGDL-FM, XEPJ-AM, XHOJ-FM, XHRX-FM, XEHK-AM, XEDK-AM, XEDKT-AM, XEZJ-AM

History
- First air date: February 23, 1987 (concession)

Technical information
- Licensing authority: CRT
- Class: C1
- ERP: 29.95 kW
- HAAT: 324.06 meters (1,063.2 ft)
- Transmitter coordinates: 20°35′59.96″N 103°21′56.76″W

Links
- Webcast: radiorama.mx/..
- Website: extasisdigital1059.com

XHQJ-FM is a radio station on 105.9 FM in Guadalajara, broadcasting from Cerro del Cuatro. The station is owned by Radiorama and carries its Éxtasis Digital adult contemporary format.

== History ==
XHQJ received its first concession on February 23, 1987. It was owned by Radiorama subsidiary Sociedad de Radiodifusión y Televisión, S.A.
