= WBMC =

- McMinnville, Tennessee; United States
- Frequency: 960 kHz
- Branding: WBMC 97.7 FM - 960 AM

Programming
- Format: News/Talk
- Affiliations: CBS News Radio; Salem Radio Network; Townhall News; Westwood One

Ownership
- Owner: Peg Broadcasting, LLC
- Sister stations: WOWC

Technical information
- Licensing authority: FCC
- Facility ID: 14734
- Class: D
- Power: 500 watts day 38 watts night
- Transmitter coordinates: 35°40′0.00″N 85°46′35.00″W
- Translator: 97.7 W249DQ (McMinnville)

Links
- Public license information: Public file; LMS
- Website: www.960wbmc.com

WBMC (960 AM) is a radio station broadcasting a news talk information format. Licensed to McMinnville, Tennessee, United States, the station is currently owned by Peg Broadcasting, LLC and features programming from CBS News Radio, Salem Radio Network, Townhall News, and Westwood One.

Previous logo
