= WEYY =

Coordinates: 33°44′43″N 85°17′16″W

- Tallapoosa, Georgia; United States
- Frequency: 88.7 MHz
- Branding: Gospel Radio Network

Programming
- Format: Christian radio

Ownership
- Owner: Barnes Evangelistic Ministries

Technical information
- Licensing authority: FCC
- Facility ID: 169466
- Class: A
- ERP: 250 watts
- HAAT: 30 meters (98 ft)

Links
- Public license information: Public file; LMS
- Website: grnradio.org

WEYY is a Christian radio station licensed to Tallapoosa, Georgia, broadcasting on 88.7 FM.
