= KAJT =

- Ada, Oklahoma; United States
- Frequency: 88.7 MHz
- Branding: SonLife Radio

Programming
- Format: Religious

Ownership
- Owner: Jimmy Swaggart Ministries; (Family Worship Center Church, Inc.)

History
- Former call signs: KQUJ (2003–2006)

Technical information
- Licensing authority: FCC
- Facility ID: 81301
- Class: C2
- ERP: 31,000 watts
- HAAT: 73 meters (240 ft)
- Transmitter coordinates: 34°46′32″N 96°35′15″W

Links
- Public license information: Public file; LMS
- Webcast: mms://206.192.61.163/sonlife

KAJT (88.7 FM, "Son Life Radio") is a radio station licensed to serve Ada, Oklahoma, United States. The station is owned by Jimmy Swaggart Ministries and the broadcast license is held by Family Worship Center Church, Inc.

== Programming ==
KAJT broadcasts a religious radio format as a member of the SonLife Radio Network, based at WJFM (88.5 FM) in Baton Rouge, Louisiana.

== History ==
This station received its original construction permit from the Federal Communications Commission on April 15, 2003. The new station was assigned the KQUJ call sign by the FCC on April 30, 2003.

In August 2004, the American Family Association reached an agreement to transfer the permit for this station to The Sister Sherry Lynn Foundation, Inc. The deal was approved by the FCC on September 27, 2004, and the transaction was consummated on April 1, 2005. This change prove short-lived as The Sister Sherry Lynn Foundation, Inc., reached an agreement in August 2005 to transfer the permit for this station to Family Worship Center Church, Inc. The deal was approved by the FCC on September 23, 2005, and the transaction was consummated on October 7, 2005.

The FCC assigned call sign KAJT to this station on April 25, 2006. KAJT received its license to cover from the FCC on June 9, 2006.
