= WAGP =

- Beaufort, South Carolina; United States
- Broadcast area: Savannah metropolitan area Hilton Head Island
- Frequency: 88.7 MHz
- Branding: The Light

Programming
- Format: Christian radio
- Affiliations: Moody Broadcasting Network; SRN News

Ownership
- Owner: Community Broadcasting Corp. of Beaufort, Inc

History
- First air date: April 1, 1986

Technical information
- Licensing authority: FCC
- Facility ID: 12534
- Class: C1
- ERP: 100,000 watts
- HAAT: 101 meters (331 ft)
- Transmitter coordinates: 32°21′27.10″N 80°55′11.20″W

Links
- Public license information: Public file; LMS
- Webcast: Listen live
- Website: wagp.net

WAGP (88.7 FM) is a non-commercial radio station licensed to Beaufort, South Carolina, United States, and serving the Savannah metropolitan area and Hilton Head Island. broadcasting. Owned by Community Broadcasting Corp. of Beaufort, Inc., it features a Christian radio format. The studios and offices are in the Community Bible Church on Parris Island Gateway in Beaufort.

The transmitter is on Lowcountry Drive in Ridgeland, South Carolina.

== Programming ==
WAGP is affiliated with the Moody Broadcasting Network and airs updates from SRN News. The station produces local call-in shows, daily bible study and a rebroadcast of the weekly sermon at a local church. On late nights, the station broadcasts Christian music.

== History ==
WAGP signed on the air on April 1, 1986.
