= KXMS =

Radio station in Joplin, Missouri

Joplin, Missouri; United States
- Broadcast area: Joplin, Missouri
- Frequency: 88.7 MHz
- Branding: Fine Arts Radio International

Programming
- Format: Classical

Ownership
- Owner: Board of Governors -- Missouri Southern State University

History
- First air date: April 5, 1986

Technical information
- Licensing authority: FCC
- Facility ID: 43225
- Class: C3
- ERP: 10,000 watts
- HAAT: 56 meters
- Transmitter coordinates: 37°5′57.00″N 94°27′46.00″W

Links
- Public license information: Public file; LMS
- Website: KXMS Online

KXMS (88.7 FM) is a radio station broadcasting a classical music format. Licensed to Joplin, Missouri, United States, the station serves the Joplin area. The station is currently owned by Board of Governors of Missouri Southern State University.
