= WWLU =

Radio station of Lincoln University in Oxford, Pennsylvania

Coordinates: 39.8101°N 75.9261°W

- Lincoln University, Pennsylvania; United States
- Broadcast area: Philadelphia metropolitan area
- Frequency: 88.7 (MHz)

Programming
- Format: Urban contemporary

Ownership
- Owner: Lincoln University

History
- First air date: 1975 (as WLIU)
- Former call signs: WWLU (1970–2002)
- Call sign meaning: Lincoln University

Technical information
- Facility ID: 37557
- Class: D
- ERP: 3 watts
- HAAT: 43 meters (141 ft)

WWLU is a non-commercial educational radio station in Lincoln University, Pennsylvania, which is owned and operated by Lincoln University. The station signed on in 1975 as WLIU. The call sign was changed to WWLU in July 2002, after the WLIU call sign was acquired by Long Island University, in Southampton, New York, for its radio station.
