= XHUAQ-FM =

University radio station in Querétaro, Querétaro, México

- Querétaro, Querétaro; Mexico
- Frequency: 89.5 FM
- Branding: Radio Universidad 89.5 FM

Programming
- Format: University radio

Ownership
- Owner: Universidad Autónoma de Querétaro
- Sister stations: XHPBQR-TDT

History
- First air date: August 3, 1979
- Call sign meaning: Universidad Autónoma de Querétaro

Technical information
- Class: A
- ERP: 3,000 watts
- HAAT: 98.22 meters (322.2 ft)
- Transmitter coordinates: 20°37′26.87″N 100°22′14.24″W (main) 20°35′31.5″N 100°24′39.5″W (aux)

Links
- Webcast: Listen live
- Website: radio.uaq.mx

XHUAQ-FM is the radio station of the Universidad Autónoma de Querétaro, located in Querétaro, Querétaro, Mexico. It broadcasts on 89.5 MHz from studios on the UAQ campus and was simulcast on AM station XEUAQ-AM 580 until 2015.

== History ==
XHUAQ-FM came to air for the first time at 8am on Friday, August 3, 1979. The new station was the first cultural radio station in the state of Querétaro and primarily had musical programming. Cultural programming increased its prevalence in the 1980s, with international programs being bought from such countries as Israel, Germany and the United States; at the same time, more university students and faculty became involved in the station's operations. One of the programs introduced in the 1980s, "Jazzmania", has been on the air since 1983 and is the oldest radio program in the state of Querétaro. The mid-1980s saw the first expansion of the XHUAQ facilities, followed by the 1987 launch of the AM station, which operated with 250 watts of power. The station also programmed more hours, particularly in the evening, adding children's programming, Caribbean music and rock in Spanish.

In 2001, Luis Alberto Fernández García brought the station into 24-hour operation and briefly separated the programming on AM and FM. This arrangement lasted for two years.

The AM station left the air in 2015. That same year, XHUAQ was authorized to increase power to 3,000 watts.

On January 13, 2020 Universidad Autónoma de Querétaro requested to the IFT a new public concession to operate a new radio station in Jalpan de Serra, Querétaro to expand its coverage. This request was approved by the IFT on December 2, 2020 designing XECPAF-AM on 850kHz

XECPAF-AM began testing in November 2022 with a 80m tower and 5kW of power as a daytimer. with a Transmitter located at the outskirts of Jalpan de Serra 21°11′33.4″N 99°27′17.0″W.

Formal transmissions began on December 7, 2022 with a ceremony including local government members of Jalpan de Serra, Landa de Matamoros, Arroyo Seco and the University Rector Teresa García Gasca.
