= WMOC =

- Lumber City, Georgia; United States
- Frequency: 88.7 MHz

Programming
- Format: Christian radio

Ownership
- Owner: Full Gospel Church of God Written

Technical information
- Licensing authority: FCC
- Facility ID: 22871
- Class: C2
- ERP: 50,000 watts
- HAAT: 64.0 meters
- Transmitter coordinates: 31°55′48.00″N 82°41′6.00″W

Links
- Public license information: Public file; LMS
- Website: mocradio.com

WMOC (88.7 FM) is a Christian radio station broadcasting a gospel music format. Licensed to Lumber City, Georgia, United States. The station is currently owned by Full Gospel Church of God Written.

Former logo
