= Radio Northern Beaches =

Australia
- Broadcast area: Northern Beaches Sydney
- Frequencies: 88.7 MHz FM and 90.3 MHz FM

Programming
- Format: Community radio

Ownership
- Owner: Manly-Warringah Media Co-operative Ltd

Technical information
- Transmitter coordinates: 88.7: 33°39′53″S 151°16′42″E; 90.3: 33°48′33.5″S 151°15′57″E

Links
- Webcast: www.rnb.org.au/stream
- Website: www.rnb.org.au

Radio Northern Beaches (callsign 2MWM) is an Australian volunteer-based community radio station transmitting from studios located in the suburb of Terrey Hills serving the Northern Beaches area of Sydney.

It broadcasts on 88.7 MHz to the north of the peninsula, covering from Palm Beach on the coast, inland to Terrey Hills, in the west. The south of the peninsula is covered on 90.3 MHz including the suburbs of Manly, Balgowlah, Fairlight and Seaforth. The coverage area is shown in this coverage map.

Radio Northern Beaches is run by the Manly-Warringah Media Co-operative Ltd.

== Programs ==
The Manly Warringah Media Co-operative Ltd is set up in the belief that individuals and groups within the community ought to have opportunity to speak to the community in the most effective way possible - radio, television, press and film.

The supply of those means in the hope that facilities offered will bring about a more effective and creative community life, break down prejudice and remove isolation where such isolation has negative results is a primary object of the co-operative. (Rule 13)

The mission of Radio Northern Beaches is to provide opportunities for individuals and groups within the Manly-Warringah-Pittwater area to make programs. As such, every program that goes to air is made by people from the local area. The co-op aims to encourage many broadcasting to many rather than few broadcasting to many.

Introductory training workshops are held regularly to introduce new members to the radio station.

All members of Radio Northern Beaches are volunteers.

== See also ==
- List of radio stations in Australia
