= KTCU-FM =

Radio station in Fort Worth, Texas

Coordinates: 32.711°N 97.366°W

- Fort Worth, Texas; United States
- Broadcast area: Dallas–Fort Worth metroplex
- Frequency: 88.7 MHz
- Branding: "The Choice"

Programming
- Format: College radio

Ownership
- Owner: Texas Christian University

History
- First air date: 1964; 62 years ago
- Call sign meaning: Texas Christian University

Technical information
- Licensing authority: FCC
- Facility ID: 65307
- Class: C3 Non-Commercial
- ERP: 10,000 watts
- HAAT: 90 meters

Links
- Public license information: Public file; LMS
- Webcast: Listen Live
- Website: ktcu.tcu.edu

KTCU-FM is a radio station in Fort Worth, Texas, broadcasting from Texas Christian University. The station has been on the air since October 6, 1964 and is broadcast out of TCU's studios with 10,000 Watts ERP.

KTCU is the college radio station affiliated with Texas Christian University in Fort Worth, Texas. Its format is primarily Indie Rock, Alternative, EDM, and Local Artists. Evenings consist of student-run specialty shows of various styles, including but not limited to sports talk, metal, jazz, true crime, Latin rock, and alternative. The programming schedule changes with new students pitching shows every semester.

Primarily run by students, KTCU is an option for students from all majors to learn a plethora of radio aspects while also providing a way to express themselves through music and sports announcing.

KTCU has a wide array of award-winning specialty shows, most notably two popular Saturday music programs that ran for 20 years...The Good Show and Sputnik Radio. Monday through Friday KTCU features the "Local Lunch", a showcase of DFW artists from Noon - 1:00. Sunday programming includes Classical music, the University Christian Church service, and various public interest programming. TCU athletic events such as Women's Basketball and Baseball are also aired on KTCU.

Originally, KTCU was broadcast only on a 10-watt current carrier to TCU housing units on campus. Once regulated by the FCC, KTCU was on 1025 AM from 1957–64. In 1964, KTCU moved to the FM dial (at 89.1) and 3000-watts. Then, KTCU moved to 88.7FM and was able to secure 10,000-watts with the Federal Communications Commission as it added to its radio tower too.

Early notables include Russ Bloxom (later news anchor at WBAP/KXAS-TV, 1967–79,) Jerry Park (co-host of WFAA's "News 8 etc..." in the early 1970s, deceased,) John Moncrief (newscaster for TSN; now deceased,) Clem Candelaria (management at KTVT-TV,) Mike Marshall (Houston radio) and Sandra McQuerry (co-host of KTVT's "Reveille.")

Current management of KTCU is Janice McCall (Co-Manager and Music Director) and Geoffrey Craig (Co-Manager and Sports Director).
