= WGFW =

- Drakes Branch, Virginia; United States
- Broadcast area: Farmville, Virginia
- Frequency: 88.7 MHz

Programming
- Format: Religious
- Affiliations: Radio 74 Internationale

Ownership
- Owner: God's Final Call & Warning, Inc.

History
- First air date: 2012
- Former call signs: WGFW (2011–Present)
- Call sign meaning: "God's Final Call and Warning"

Technical information
- Licensing authority: FCC
- Facility ID: 174083
- Class: A
- ERP: 2,300 watts
- HAAT: 62 meters (203 ft)
- Transmitter coordinates: 37°8′39.0″N 78°32′54.0″W

Links
- Public license information: Public file; LMS
- Webcast: Listen live
- Website: godsfinalcallandwarning.com

WGFW is a religious formatted broadcast radio station licensed to Drakes Branch, Virginia, serving Farmville, Virginia. WGFW is owned and operated by God's Final Call & Warning, Inc.
