= WJLN =

- White Springs, Florida; United States
- Frequency: 88.7 MHz
- Branding: The Source

Programming
- Format: Religious

Ownership
- Owner: Faith and Action Community Outreach, Inc.

Technical information
- Licensing authority: FCC
- Facility ID: 171630
- Class: A
- ERP: 650 watts
- HAAT: 40 metres (130 ft)
- Transmitter coordinates: 30°15′1″N 82°43′48″W

Links
- Public license information: Public file; LMS
- Website: Official Website

WJLN (88.7 FM) is a radio station licensed to serve the community of White Springs, Florida. The station is owned by Faith and Action Community Outreach, Inc. It airs a religious format.

The station was assigned the WJLN call letters by the Federal Communications Commission on November 19, 2010.
