= WCYJ-FM =

Student-run radio station in Waynesburg, Pennsylvania

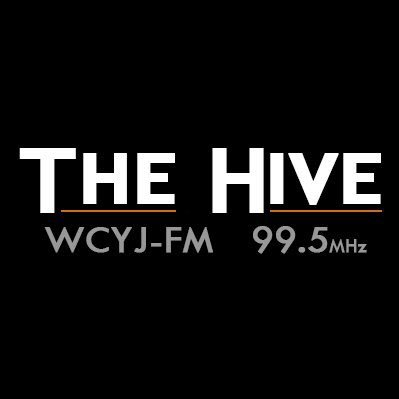
- Waynesburg, Pennsylvania; United States
- Broadcast area: Waynesburg, Pennsylvania
- Frequency: 99.5 MHz
- Branding: The Hive

Programming
- Format: Hot adult contemporary

Ownership
- Owner: Waynesburg University

History
- Call sign meaning: Waynesburg University Yellow Jackets

Technical information
- Licensing authority: FCC
- Facility ID: 66648
- Class: D
- ERP: 7 watts
- HAAT: -1 meters
- Transmitter coordinates: 39°53′59.00″N 80°11′6.00″W

Links
- Public license information: Public file; LMS
- Website: waynesburg.edu WCYJ Online

WCYJ-FM (99.5 FM) is a student-run radio station broadcasting a hot adult contemporary format. Licensed to Waynesburg, Pennsylvania, US, it serves the Waynesburg area. The station is currently owned by Waynesburg University. Streaming live at www.waynesburgsports.com

Popular programs include shows like "The Love Lounge," which was started by alumnus Antonio Pelullo. Other shows, such as "Two Dudes on the Radio" are big hits for the station. WCYJ-FM is led by student general manager Christopher Hulse.

WCYJ-FM also broadcast Waynesburg sporting events, such as football, basketball and baseball.
