= WSYC-FM =

Coordinates: 40.075°N 77.521°W

- Shippensburg, Pennsylvania; United States
- Frequency: 88.7 MHz
- Branding: 88-7 WSYC

Programming
- Format: College radio
- Affiliations: Red Raider Radio Network

Ownership
- Owner: Shippensburg University of Pennsylvania

History
- First air date: March 24, 1975 (50 years ago)
- Call sign meaning: "We Serve Your Community"

Technical information
- Licensing authority: FCC
- Class: A
- Power: 130 watts

Links
- Public license information: Public file; LMS
- Webcast: WSYC webstream
- Website: WSYC online

WSYC-FM (88.7 FM) is a college radio station licensed to Shippensburg, Pennsylvania, United States. WSYC is owned and operated by Shippensburg University of Pennsylvania.

== Programming ==
The format is dedicated to showcasing new bands and artists that mainstream stations have yet to discover. Programming on WSYC-FM includes the college radio classics, independent labels and artists, various specialty shows featuring specific genres, news updates, and talk shows.

WSYC-FM additionally serves as the Raider Sports Network, broadcasting all Raider football and basketball games, as well as other Raiders sports.

WSYC-FM is also the home to the sports talk show, The Bottom Line, hosted by student JD Dorazio, amongst other student radio shows such as Tea Time, Strawberry Jams, Mirrorball, and Good Songs for Hard Times.

Lastly, WSYC-FM has hosted an annual event, "Up All Night", since 2012. Shippensburg University students can win various prizes over a 24-hour period that includes DJ sets, live music, and commentary. "Up All Night" was founded by alumni Matthew Kanzler.
