= CKUG-FM =

Radio station in Kugluktuk, Nunavut, Canada

Coordinates: 67°49′33″N 115°05′38″W

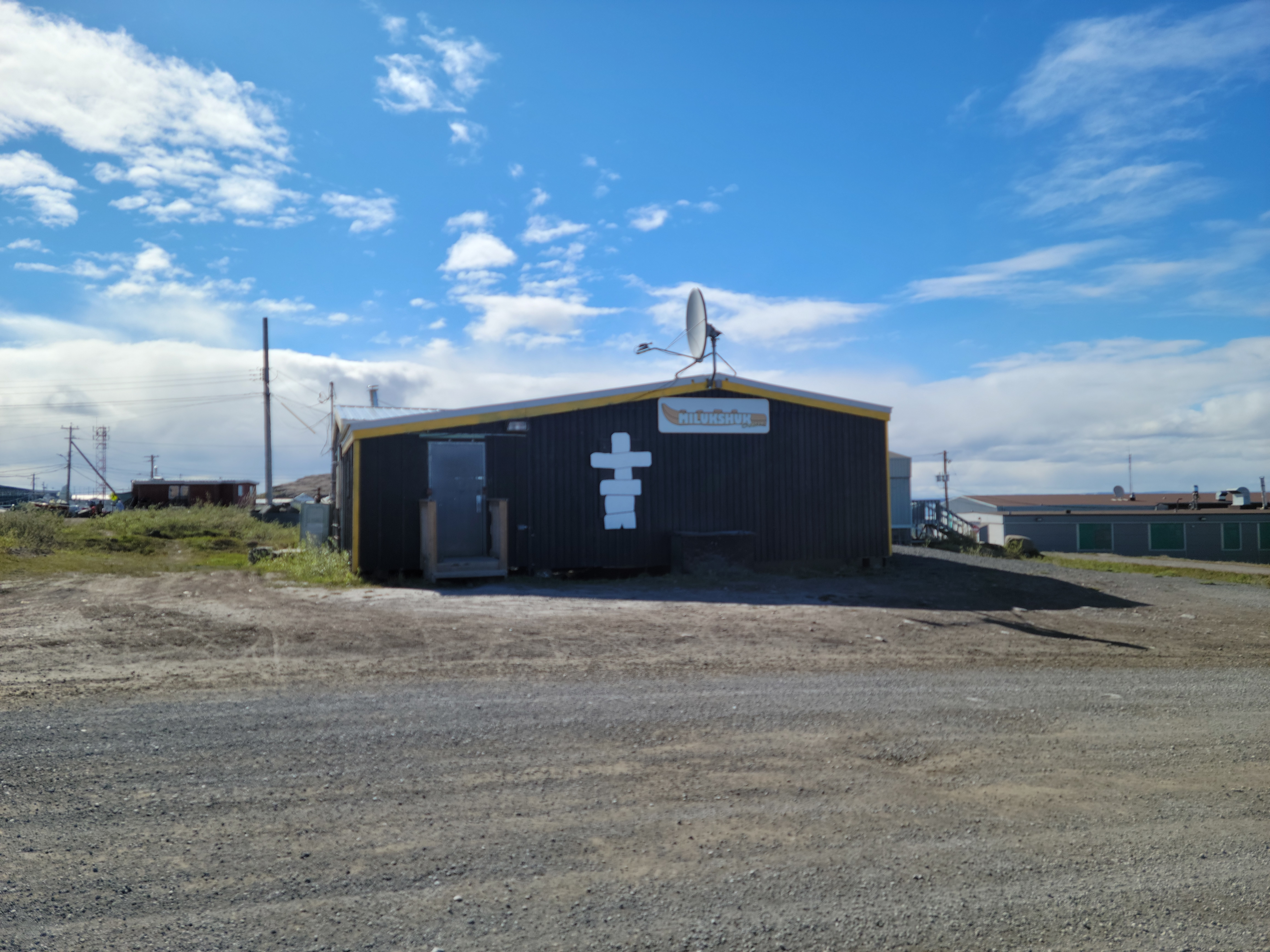
- Building which houses CKUG-FM
- Kugluktuk, Nunavut; Canada
- Frequency: 88.7 MHz
- Branding: Buzz FM

Programming
- Format: Community radio

Ownership
- Owner: Municipality of Kugluktuk

History
- First air date: 1999

Links
- Website: ckug.ca

CKUG-FM is a radio station that broadcasts at 88.7 FM in Kugluktuk, Nunavut, Canada. The station has aired a community radio format branded as Buzz FM.

The station was launched in 1999 by the Kugluktuk Radio Society, following the demise of an earlier community radio organization in 1995. The station's programming was produced entirely by community volunteers, including music and talk programming in both English and Inuinnaqtun; in 2014, the station created a 45-hour training course in community radio operation, in conjunction with Nunavut Arctic College.

The Kugluktuk Radio Society owned and operated the station until it was acquired by the municipal government in 2018.
