= WMGO =

Radio station in Canton–Jackson, Mississippi

- Canton, Mississippi; United States
- Broadcast area: Jackson, Mississippi
- Frequency: 1370 kHz
- Branding: 1370 WMGO

Programming
- Format: Full-service
- Affiliations: Supertalk Mississippi

Ownership
- Owner: WMGO Broadcasting Corp.

History
- First air date: 1953 (as WDOB)
- Former call signs: WDOB (1953–1963)
- Call sign meaning: Watch Madison Go

Technical information
- Licensing authority: FCC
- Facility ID: 73259
- Class: D
- Power: 1,000 watts day 28 watts night
- Transmitter coordinates: 32°37′36″N 90°1′47″W

Links
- Public license information: Public file; LMS

WMGO (1370 AM) is a radio station broadcasting a full service format. Licensed to Canton, Mississippi, United States, the station serves the Jackson, Mississippi area. The station is currently owned by WMGO Broadcasting Corp.

== History ==
On July 10, 1952, the Madison County Broadcasting Company, owned by Annie Dee Davis, James T. Ownby, and J. Dige Bishop, received a construction permit from the Federal Communications Commission for a new daytime-only radio station on 1370 kHz at Canton. Originally broadcasting with 500 watts, WMGO began broadcasting in 1953; it was approved to increase power to 1,000 watts the next year. The original owners filed to transfer control of the station to W. E. Farrar, R. E. and Lucille Hook, and Hugh Hughes in 1956; Hook bought out Farrar and Hughes the next year.

In 1963, the Hooks sold the station to Roy James Loflin, Jr., and Wilbur Rodney Williams. As the sale awaited completion, the station was briefly taken off-air in April when a tractor plowed into the transmission line; the engineer intervened in time to prevent the driver from touching the electrified wiring. The new owners relaunched the station as WMGO on July 9, 1963, from new studios. Two years later, they sold WMGO to the Canton Broadcasting Corporation. Under Canton Broadcasting ownership, the station continued to have an almost entirely White air staff, with the only Black personalities featured on Sunday mornings. Canton retained the station for more than 15 years, selling to two men from Fairhope, Alabama, in 1981; they owned the station until 1990, when it was sold to McCulloch. New investors were brought in during 1993.

WMGO was joined by an FM sister station in 1997 when owner Jerry Lousteau built WMGO-FM 93.1, licensed to Yazoo City. In 2014, WMGO owner Lousteau revealed that political ads placed on the station against United States Senate candidate Chris McDaniel, linking him to the Ku Klux Klan, had been placed by a Democratic Party operative.

WMGO also broadcasts short form local news simply branded as "The Local Report". The program focuses on local news, weather, and obituaries in Canton, and airs at 7, 8 and 9 AM, and at noon and is anchored by Keith Hill.

The previous owner and presenter Jerry Lousteau died of cancer on May 25, 2024.
