= XHITT-FM =

Public radio station in Tijuana, Baja California, Mexico

- Tijuana, Baja California; Mexico
- Frequency: 88.7 MHz
- Branding: Radio Tecnológico

Programming
- Format: Public Radio

Ownership
- Owner: Instituto Tecnólogico de Tijuana; (Patronato Pro-Estación Cultural del Instituto Tecnológico de Tijuana X.H.I.T.T., A.C.)

History
- First air date: June 13, 1987
- Call sign meaning: Instituto Tecnológico de Tijuana

Technical information
- Licensing authority: CRT
- Class: A
- ERP: 1,150 Watts
- HAAT: 79 m (259 ft)

Links
- Website: tijuana.tecnm.mx/radio-tecnologico

XHITT-FM (88.7 MHz) is a public radio station in Tijuana, Baja California, Mexico, owned by the Instituto Tecnológico de Tijuana.

While the technological institute had sought a station since 1977, XHITT received its initial permit on September 30, 1986, but transmissions did not begin until June 13, 1987, at 5:17 p.m., when Héctor Magaña, the station manager, exclaimed "¡Buenas tardes, Tijuana!" (Good afternoon, Tijuana!) on the station. Formal transmissions began on October 29.
