= KTDV =

Radio station in State Center–Marshalltown, Iowa

Coordinates: 42°15′49″N 93°03′57″W

- State Center, Iowa; United States
- Broadcast area: Marshalltown, Iowa; Iowa Falls, Iowa
- Frequency: 91.9 MHz
- Branding: The Dove

Programming
- Format: Christian contemporary music

Ownership
- Owner: Marshalltown Education Plus, Inc.

Technical information
- Licensing authority: FCC
- Facility ID: 92457
- Class: C3
- ERP: 22,000 watts
- HAAT: 93.6 meters (307 ft)

Links
- Public license information: Public file; LMS
- Website: http://www.ktdvradio.com/

KTDV is a radio station airing a contemporary Christian music format licensed to State Center, Iowa, broadcasting on 91.9 FM. The station serves the areas of Marshalltown, Iowa and Iowa Falls, Iowa, and is owned by Marshalltown Education Plus, Inc.
