= Coast FM (Adelaide) =

Australian community radio station

Coordinates: 34°57′52″S 138°34′00″E

Australia
- Frequency: 88.7 MHz

Ownership
- Owner: Southern & Western Community Broadcasters Inc.

Links
- Website: www.coastfm.com.au

Coast FM is an Australian community radio station based in Glandore, South Australia. It transmits on 88.7 FM, and is licensed to transmit to the Southern and Western areas of Adelaide.

Officially known as Southern & Western Community Broadcasters Inc., it was incorporated and began test transmissions in 1986. It transmits locally produced music programs of many genres, and also has a multitude of Adelaide community based programmes. These include programmes about sports including Australian rules football and bowls, community based organisations, and smaller charitable organisations that don't receive exposure through other local media.

All of its presenters are volunteers, and its studio is staffed 24 hours a day.

Coast FM is a Member of the Community Broadcasting Association of Australia, and a member station of the South Australian Community Broadcasters Association. It maintains programmes that comply with the CBAA Codes Of Practice, and programmes are regularly reviewed for their compliance.
