= CHVI-FM =

Christian radio station in Campbell River, British Columbia

- Campbell River, British Columbia; Canada
- Frequency: 88.7 MHz
- Branding: Spirit FM

Programming
- Format: Christian radio

Ownership
- Owner: Total Change Ministries Inc.

History
- First air date: April 8, 2011

Technical information
- Licensing authority: CRTC
- ERP: 50 watts
- HAAT: 51.6 metres (169 ft)
- Transmitter coordinates: 50°00′07″N 125°14′47″W

Links
- Website: spiritfm.ca

CHVI-FM (Spirit FM) is a Canadian radio station, which broadcasts a low-power Christian radio format on the frequency of 88.7 FM in Campbell River, British Columbia, with an effective radiated power of 50 watts. The manager of Spirit FM and president of Total Change Ministries is Terry Somerville.

Owned by Total Change Christian Ministries, the station received CRTC approval on October 15, 2010, and began broadcasting on April 8, 2011.
