= KAGU =

Spokane, Washington; United States
- Broadcast area: Spokane metropolitan area
- Frequency: 88.7 MHz (HD Radio)
- Branding: KAGU Radio

Programming
- Format: Classical/College radio

Ownership
- Owner: Gonzaga University; (Gonzaga University Telecommunications Association)

History
- First air date: 1988
- Call sign meaning: Gonzaga University

Technical information
- Licensing authority: FCC
- Facility ID: 24560
- Class: C1
- ERP: 5,000 watts
- HAAT: 466 meters (1,529 ft)
- Transmitter coordinates: 47.581°N 117.297°W

Links
- Public license information: Public file; LMS

KAGU (88.7 MHz) is a non-profit FM radio station run by Gonzaga University in Spokane, Washington. It broadcasts a classical music radio format for the Spokane metropolitan area.

KAGU has an effective radiated power (ERP) of 5,000 watts. The transmitter is off South Krell Ridge Lane in Spokane Valley, Washington, amid the towers for other Spokane-area FM and TV stations.

== History ==
The station was founded in 1988. Billing itself as the "hundred-thousand milliwatt of the River City", KAGU broadcast a 100 watt signal throughout Spokane. Other slogans included "your only alternative" and "proletariat and bourgeoisie alike agree!"

In its first year, KAGU was largely relegated to a radio format of Adult contemporary music with student reports of news and sports as live lab voice work. But in 1987–89 things changed with KAGU when Station Manager John Hipp developed radio shows that were cutting edge college radio. By year's end in 1988 there was a renaissance of student shows that stand as some of the station's most creative and exciting productions. Among the repertoire were live sports broadcasts, live speaker series, live theatre audiocasts, live weekly music shows, and student-sponsored music genre shows.

Notable among the broadcasts at the time were the shows Folk Stew which showcased live Spokane, Washington regional folk and blues musicians, the Cork the Tuna's Skipped Grooves show on which Steve MacCorkle brought the edge of his bay area roots and love for alternative new wave and punk tunes, and John Hipp's show The Hippster Radio Identity Crisis which was a cornucopia of musical treasures & Dead Before Midnight featuring Live Grateful Dead bootlegs. These are notable examples of the early days of KAGU, but there were other student shows which also added to the vibe and fabric of the exciting first years of the station.

A marketing high point was achieved when the infamous trailer "Fish For Breakfast" was broadcast in 1994. The concept was simple: the voiceover stated "Fish For Breakfast, and KAGU every night. That's the way it oughtta be!" Daily programming included alternative rock and specialty shows from 7 AM to midnight. One standout show was “The Rap Attack” hosted by Tobin Costen and cohosted by GrandMixer GMS, who did live and prerecorded music mixes. The show aired on Monday nights and was the only hip-hop radio show in Spokane at the time and featured local artists alongside established acts. This show made history in debuting several records before they were released, including Dr. Dre’s “The Chronic” album and Sir Mix-A-Lot’s, “Baby Got Back.” The show aired from 1991 until 1994, and was featured in international magazine, PROP$. (PROP$ Magazine article, Vol. 1, No. 2, p. 12, Dec. 1993.) The show ended when Tobin graduated and moved to the Bay Area to work for No Limit Records, later documented on BET’s “No Limit Chronicles.”

In the fall semester of 1996, KAGU converted to classical music on the orders of Rev. Robert Lyons, then the head of Gonzaga's broadcast media program, without any student input.

In late 2004, the KAGU transmitter and antennae were moved from atop the GU Administration Building to the KHQ-TV tower site on Tower Mountain in southeast Spokane. With the tower move, KAGU’s power was boosted from 100 watts to 5,000 watts. Currently, the KAGU signal reaches a 60-mile radius from Tower Mountain. It is the Spokane affiliate of the Metropolitan Opera radio broadcasts.
