= CHIC-FM =

Radio station in Rouyn-Noranda, Quebec

Coordinates: 48°18′05″N 79°03′09″W

CHIC-FM, is a Canadian radio station, which broadcasts Christian radio on 88.7 MHz (FM) in Rouyn-Noranda, Quebec.

== History ==
On March 5, 2001, the CRTC approved an application by André Curadeau, on behalf of a company to be incorporated, for a new French-language specialty FM radio station at Rouyn-Noranda. The station began broadcasting in 2002.

== Notes ==
CHIC-FM was also the original call sign of a radio station in Toronto known as CFNY-FM.

== Previous logos ==
CHIC-FM previous logo (undated)
