= WPCD =

- Champaign, Illinois; United States
- Broadcast area: Champaign–Urbana metropolitan area
- Frequency: 88.7 MHz
- Branding: 887 WPCD FM

Programming
- Format: Alternative

Ownership
- Owner: Parkland College

History
- First air date: January 1978
- Call sign meaning: Parkland College District

Technical information
- Licensing authority: FCC
- Facility ID: 51693
- Class: B1
- ERP: 10,500 watts
- HAAT: 103 meters (338 ft)
- Transmitter coordinates: 40°13′27″N 88°17′56″W

Links
- Public license information: Public file; LMS
- Webcast: Listen live
- Website: www.parkland.edu/WPCD

WPCD (88.7 FM) is a radio station broadcasting an alternative format. Licensed to Champaign, Illinois, United States, the station serves the Champaign–Urbana metropolitan area. The station is owned by Parkland College and features programming from AP Radio.
