= WOCA =

- Ocala, Florida; United States
- Broadcast area: Ocala, Florida
- Frequency: 1370 kHz
- Branding: The Source

Programming
- Format: News/Talk
- Affiliations: Fox News Radio; Fox Sports Radio; Westwood One

Ownership
- Owner: Generations Broadcasting Corp.

History
- First air date: November 19, 1957

Technical information
- Licensing authority: FCC
- Facility ID: 57064
- Class: D
- Power: 5,000 watts day 33 watts night
- Transmitter coordinates: 29°12′5.27″N 82°9′6.01″W
- Translator: 96.3 W242CA (Ocala)

Links
- Public license information: Public file; LMS
- Webcast: Listen Live
- Website: thesource1370.com

WOCA (1370 AM, 96.3 FM) is a commercial radio station in Ocala, Florida. WOCA broadcasts a variety of syndicated and conservative-leaning programs, including The Glenn Beck Program each weekday. The station also produces shows for a number of local commentators.

== History ==
WOCA signed on as WHYS on November 19, 1957. In 1959, the call letters were changed to WKOS. In 1965, the station adopted a Top 40 format as WWKE. The station then switched to the current calls, WOCA in 1983.
