= Radio y Televisión Querétaro =

Public broadcaster of the Mexican state of Querétaro

Radio y Televisión Querétaro (RTQ) is the state radio and television network of the Mexican state of Querétaro, broadcasting on two radio stations and one television station in the state. It is operated by the Sistema Estatal de Comunicación Cultural y Educativa del Gobierno de Querétaro (SECCE), or "State System for Cultural and Educational Communication of the Government of Querétaro".

== Radio ==
XEQUE-AM 1150 kHz came to air on February 5, 1988, a day after its formal inauguration by President Miguel de la Madrid. Radio Querétaro was initially considered among the best noncommercial radio stations in Mexico, earning favorable comparisons to Radio Educación. In June 2005, XEQUE was replaced with a new FM station, XHQUE-FM on 100.3 MHz with 15 kilowatts ERP and location 20°38′57.4″N 100°24′40.1″W.

In 2005, the state government applied for a new AM radio station to be located in Jalpan de Serra, and XEQJAL-AM 1200 kHz, a 5 kW daytimer location 21°12′03″N 99°27′02.6″W, signed on after receiving its permit in early 2007. The permit failed to be renewed; on September 18, 2019, a substitute concession for XECPAC-AM 1200 was granted.

== Television ==
XHSECE-TDT
Querétaro, Querétaro; Mexico
- Channels: Digital: 14 (UHF); Virtual: 10
- Branding: Radio y Televisión Querétaro

Ownership
- Owner: Gobierno del Estado de Querétaro; (Sistema Estatal de Comunicación Cultural y Educativa del Gobierno de Querétaro)

History
- Founded: January 11, 2012 (permit received)
- Call sign meaning: Sistema Estatal de Comunicación Cultural y Educativa

Technical information
- Licensing authority: CRT
- ERP: 5 kW
- Transmitter coordinates: 20°31′45.1″N 100°21′37.8″W

Links
- Website: https://www.rtq.mx/

In January 2012, Cofetel awarded the permit for a digital television station on channel 50 with callsign XHSECE-TDT to SECCE in January 2012, making XHSECE one of two new public television stations in Querétaro, alongside OPMA transmitter XHOPMQ-TDT (channel 30). XHSECE's transmitter is located in El Cimatario National Park along with those for other stations serving Querétaro. XHSECE was assigned virtual channel 10 in 2016.

In March 2018, in order to facilitate the repacking of TV services out of the 600 MHz band (channels 38-51), XHSECE was assigned channel 14 for continued digital operations.
