= WBWV =

- Beckley, West Virginia; United States
- Broadcast area: Beckley, West Virginia; Oak Hill, West Virginia; Hinton, West Virginia
- Frequency: 88.7 MHz

Programming
- Format: Contemporary Christian

Ownership
- Owner: Slingshot Broadcasting Corporation

History
- Call sign meaning: W Beckley West Virginia

Technical information
- Licensing authority: FCC
- Facility ID: 173476
- Class: B1
- Power: 950 watts
- HAAT: 286.0 meters (938.3 ft)
- Transmitter coordinates: 37°51′31″N 80°55′31″W

Links
- Public license information: Public file; LMS

WBWV is a Contemporary Christian formatted broadcast radio station licensed to Beckley, West Virginia, serving the Beckley/Oak Hill/Hinton area. WBWV is owned and operated by Slingshot Broadcasting Corporation.
