= WCDG =

Coordinates: 34°33′10″N 83°58′05″W

- Dahlonega, Georgia; United States
- Frequency: 88.7 MHz
- Branding: Today's Christian Country

Programming
- Format: Christian country; Christian talk and teaching

Ownership
- Owner: Legacy Broadcasting, Inc.

Technical information
- Licensing authority: FCC
- Facility ID: 172359
- Class: A
- ERP: 600 watts
- HAAT: −28 meters (−92 ft)

Links
- Public license information: Public file; LMS
- Webcast: Listen live
- Website: todayschristiancountry.com/wcdg

WCDG (88.7 FM) is a radio station licensed to Dahlonega, Georgia. The station broadcasts a Christian country and Christian talk and teaching format and is owned by Legacy Broadcasting, Inc.

Effective January 8, 2021, Legacy Broadcasting, also owners of KYMS in Idaho, acquired WCDG from Silver Dove Broadcasting, Inc. for $75,000.
