= Autonomous University of Querétaro =

University in Mexico

- Universidad Autónoma de Querétaro
- Former names: Universidad de Querétaro (University of Querétaro)
- Motto: Spanish: Educo en la verdad y en el honor
- Type: Public university
- Established: 25 February 1951
- Affiliations: ANUIES CONAHEC
- Rector: Dra. Silvia Lorena Amaya Llano
- Academic staff: 1,431
- Students: 28,110 (January 2016, including high school)
- Undergraduates: 19,591
- Postgraduates: 2,563 (2015)
- Location: Santiago de Querétaro, Querétaro, Mexico; 20.591046°N 100.410127°W
- Campus: Several across the state; mostly urban.
- Colors: White and light blue
- Website: http://www.uaq.mx

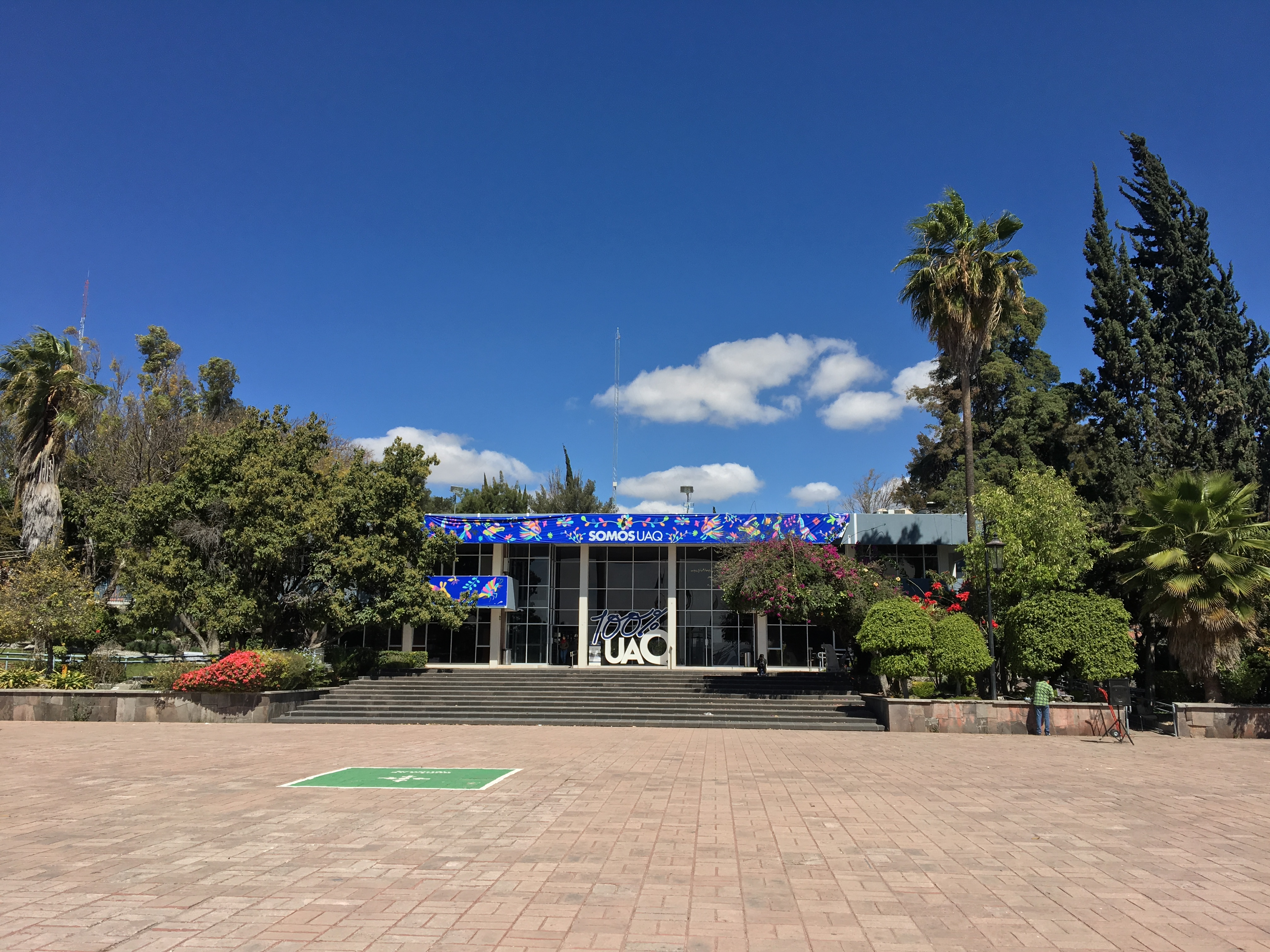
UAQ Rectory

The Autonomous University of Querétaro (in Spanish: Universidad Autónoma de Querétaro, UAQ) is a Mexican public university based in the city of Santiago de Querétaro, Querétaro, but with campuses around the state. The main campus is located in Cerro de las Campanas, but there are campuses in Amealco, Amazcala, Cadereyta, Corregidora, Jalpan, Juriquilla, San Juan del Río, and Tequisquiapan. It is the largest and most important university in both the state and the city of Querétaro.

== History ==
The University of Querétaro (now the Autonomous University of Querétaro) was founded in 1951 after the closing of the Civil School. Octavio S. Mondragón, then Governor of Querétaro, helped found the university, in the form of a High School, Law School, and Engineering School. In 1952, the School of Chemistry and the School of Nursing were formed. In 1953, the Institute of Fine Arts was formed, and in 1954 the School of Commerce began.

On February 5, 1959, the university was declared autonomous. In 1967 the School of Psychology and the School of Modern Languages were created. The Cerro de las Campanas Campus became the main campus in December 1973. In 1978, the School of Medicine was founded; in 1984, Sociology; 1985, Veterinary; in 1978, both the School of Informatics (Computer Science) and the School of Philosophy. In 2010 the University opened its new Language Learning Facilities on the grounds of the old Ing. Fernando Espinoza Gutiérrez International Airport.

== Media ==
The university operates a radio station, XHUAQ-FM 89.5, and XHPBQR-TDT, a television station on virtual channel 24.

== Schools ==
- Escuela de Bachilleres (High School)
  - North School
  - South School
  - Pedro Escobedo School
  - San Juan del Río School
  - Ajuchitlán School
  - Bicentenario School

=== Colleges ===
- Contability and Administration College
- Chemistry College
- Engineering College
- Fine Arts College
- Informatics College
- Languages and Letters College
- Laws College
- Medicine College
- Naturals Sciences College
- Nursing College
- Philosophy College
- Politics and Social Sciences College
- Psychology College

== See also ==
- List of Jesuit sites
