= XHJX-FM =

Radio station in Querétaro, Querétaro, Mexico

- Querétaro, Querétaro; Mexico
- Frequency: 88.7 FM
- Branding: Radio Fórmula

Programming
- Format: News/talk

Ownership
- Owner: Grupo Fórmula; (Transmisora Regional Radio Fórmula, S.A. de C.V.)

History
- First air date: October 11, 1941

Technical information
- Class: AA
- ERP: 0.750 kW
- HAAT: 263.47 m
- Transmitter coordinates: 20°39′58.7″N 100°21′19″W

Links
- Webcast: Listen live
- Website: radioformula.com.mx

XHJX-FM is a radio station in Querétaro, Querétaro, Mexico. Broadcasting on 88.7 FM, XHJX is the local transmitter for Radio Fórmula programming.

== History ==
XEJX-AM 1450, later 1250, signed on air on October 11, 1941, after receiving its concession on July 8 of that year. General Ramón Rodríguez Familiar, a former governor of the state of Querétaro, obtained the concession through the company Radio Emisora Queretana, S. de R.L. In 1949, the company added a new station, XENA-AM 1450 (now XHNAQ-FM 104.9).

In 1962, XEJX and XENA moved to new facilities in Querétaro, inaugurated by Governor Manuel González Cossio, known as the Edificio Desarrollo Radiofónico (Radio Development Building). The building later came to serve as the company's namesake. The station was known as "Radio Dólar", referring to the then-exchange rate of one U.S. dollar for 12.5 pesos. In the 1980s, the station became "La Divertida 1250", but the Radio Dólar name returned in 1988 only to disappear again in 1993.

Later on, the station turned toward various other formats: talk Antena 1250 and later grupera-formatted Radio Lobo Querétaro, a franchise of the Celaya station.

In 1999, three months after changing formats to romantic music, Desarrollo Radiofónico (later renamed Multimundo Radio) sold XEJX to Organización Radio Fórmula, which changed its format to Radio Fórmula programming. XEJX carried the Segunda Cadena of Radio Fórmula with some local programs.

In 2012, XEJX began direct operation from Mexico City, and the FM station launched. On April 11, 2014, 1250 AM went off the air permanently.
