= XHNAQ-FM =

Radio station in Querétaro, Querétaro, Mexico

- Querétaro, Querétaro; Mexico
- Frequency: 104.9 MHz
- Branding: Lokura FM Rock

Programming
- Format: Classic rock

Ownership
- Owner: Capital Media; (Radiodifusoras Capital, S.A. de C.V.)

History
- First air date: 1949
- Former call signs: XENA-AM
- Former frequencies: 1450 kHz
- Call sign meaning: From former XENA-AM call sign plus Q for Querétaro

Technical information
- Class: AA
- ERP: 6 kW
- HAAT: -22.5 m
- Transmitter coordinates: 20°36′9.5″N 100°26′10″W

Links
- Webcast: Listen live
- Website: lokura.fm/queretaro/

XHNAQ-FM is a radio station in Querétaro, Querétaro. Broadcasting on 104.9 FM, XHNAQ is owned by Capital Media and is known as Lokura FM Rock with a classic rock format.

== History ==
Logo used as Capital FM between 2011 and 2019

XENA-AM 1450 came to air in 1949 as the second station of Radio Emisora Queretana, which owned XEJX 1250.

In 1962, XENA and XEJX moved to new facilities in Querétaro, inaugurated by Governor Manuel González Cossio, known as the Edificio Desarrollo Radiofónico (Radio Development Building). The building later came to serve as the company's namesake. XENA would be sold to Capital Media (Radiodifusoras Capital) in 2005.

XENA moved to FM in the early 2010s. Because the XHNA-FM and XHENA-FM call signs were taken, XENA became XHNAQ-FM with the added Q for the state (Querétaro). This same change in call sign occurred with several other AM to FM migrants.

On January 1, 2019, XHNAQ flipped to grupera under the Capital Máxima brand. The format lasted just seven months; on August 1, the station flipped to romantic as La Romántica. On June 8, 2020, XHNAQ was one of seven stations to debut the new Lokura FM adult hits brand. Lokura FM was split into rock, pop, and grupera brands in 2023, with XHNAQ the first to break off with the rock format.
