= Radio 74 Internationale =

Adventist Christian radio network

- Type: Radio network
- Country: United States

Links
- Webcast: Listen live
- Website: https://www.radio74.net/

Radio 74 Internationale is a network of Christian radio stations in the United States, broadcasting Seventh-day Adventist Christian talk and teaching programs as well as Christian music.

== History ==
Radio 74's origins lie in a radio station in France, established in 1982. The first American affiliate was WHHC-LP in New Castle, Indiana, which began broadcasting in 2004; many other affiliates also signed on that year.

== Stations ==
Many of Radio 74's affiliates are owned by local Seventh-day Adventist (SDA) churches (3ABN supports the mission of the SDA).

Call sign	Frequency	City of license	FID	ERP (W)	HAAT	Class	FCC info
KFNP-LP	99.5 FM	North Pole, Alaska	195873	100	38 m (125 ft)	LP1	LMS
KSHM	91.3 FM	Show Low, Arizona	176956	2,700	75.0 m (246 ft)	A	LMS
KJNN-LP	94.3 FM	Holbrook, Arizona	135598	100	−51.6 m (−169 ft)	LP1	LMS
KJPN	89.3 FM	Payson, Arizona	175859	100	299 m (981 ft)	A	LMS
KHSA-LP	107.3 FM	Hot Springs, Arkansas	135443	100	13 m (43 ft)	LP1	LMS
KJSA	89.7 FM	Jonesboro, Arkansas	176248	10,500	12.0 m (39 ft)	C3	LMS
KJAT-LP	97.3 FM	Sulphur Springs, Benton County, Arkansas	135764	100	20.4 m (67 ft)	LP1	LMS
KWHA	89.9 FM	West Helena, Arkansas	176074	5,000	81.0 m (266 ft)	A	LMS
KIHW-LP	104.1 FM	West Helena, Arkansas	135189	24	59.3 m (195 ft)	LP1	LMS
KCCQ-LP	105.9 FM	Crescent City, California	196068	100	−17.71 m (−58 ft)	LP1	LMS
KIIW-LP	93.3 FM	Dobbins, California	195328	100	0.9 m (3 ft)	LP1	LMS
KWRS-LP	107.3 FM	Redlands, California	197037	100	8 m (26 ft)	LP1	LMS
KRSF	89.3 FM	Ridgecrest, California	175757	890	394 m (1,293 ft)	B1	LMS
KPLS	(1510 kHz) FM	Littleton, Colorado	52249	10,000 day 25,000 night	0 m (0 ft)	B	LMS
KPLS-FM	97.7 FM	Strasburg, Colorado	90911	25,000	16.0 m (52 ft)	C3	LMS
WAPQ-LP	95.9 FM	Avon Park, Florida	135640	100	24 m (79 ft)	LP1	LMS
WHMF	91.1 FM	Marianna, Florida	173595	1,300	39.0 m (128 ft)	A	LMS
WJWY-LP	92.3 FM	Wauchula, Florida	196120	100	15.78 m (52 ft)	LP1	LMS
WHHC-LP	100.1 FM	New Castle, Indiana	123622	100	30.0 m (98 ft)	LP1	LMS
WJJD-LP	101.3 FM	Kokomo, Indiana	123669	100	26.4 m (87 ft)	LP1	LMS
KBFA-LP	95.7 FM	West Monroe, Louisiana	197255	73	35.01 m (115 ft)	LP1	LMS
WSJB-LP	96.9 FM	St. Joseph, Michigan	194835	100	29 m (95 ft)	LP1	LMS
KSDC-LP	94.9 FM	Centralia, Missouri	132448	100	16.42 m (54 ft)	LP1	LMS
KZBN	90.3 FM	Bozeman, Montana	136698	12,500	−168 m (−551 ft)	C3	LMS
KMEA-LP	92.7 FM	Bozeman, Montana	135715	100	−70.5 m (−231 ft)	LP1	LMS
KQQM	88.3 FM	Miles City, Montana	176165	4,000	170 m (558 ft)	C3	LMS

Call sign	Frequency	City of license	FID	ERP (W)	HAAT	Class	FCC info
KJGS	91.9 FM	Aurora, Nebraska	175743	200	8 m (26 ft)	A	LMS
KQQA	90.5 FM	Shelton, Nebraska	176696	600	45 m (148 ft)	A	LMS
KAQQ-LP	99.9 FM	Alliance, Nebraska	196247	62	28 m (92 ft)	LP1	LMS
KBDP-LP	99.9 FM	Bridgeport, Nebraska	196278	73	−1.5 m (−5 ft)	LP1	LMS
KQQO-LP	97.7 FM	Ogallala, Nebraska	196364	63	9.6 m (31 ft)	LP1	LMS
KQSI-LP	89.5 FM	Sidney, Nebraska	196400	65	9.8 m (32 ft)	LP1	LMS
KCPJ-LP	105.7 FM	Crete, Nebraska	197538	100	30 m (98 ft)	LP1	LMS
KGCO-LP	107.9 FM	Crete, Nebraska	197558	100	−0.2 m (−1 ft)	LP1	LMS
KTQQ	88.1 FM	Elko, Nevada	175328	230	552 m (1,811 ft)	C3	LMS
WOPT-LP	95.9 FM	Waynesville, North Carolina	195852	100	−99.7 m (−327 ft)	LP1	LMS
KJIT-LP	106.7 FM	Bismarck, North Dakota	135691	45	44.2 m (145 ft)	LP1	LMS
WAOM	90.5 FM	Mowrystown, Ohio	174080	5,000	31.0 m (102 ft)	A	LMS
KIEL	89.3 FM	Loyal, Oklahoma	174679	6,000	27.0 m (89 ft)	A	LMS
KUMP-LP	107.9 FM	Days Creek, Oregon	135478	100	−131.4 m (−431 ft)	LP1	LMS
KOTU-LP	107.9 FM	Riddle, Oregon	195833	100	−184.3 m (−605 ft)	LP1	LMS
WBBY-LP	100.3 FM	Berwick, Pennsylvania	134940	100	−62.9 m (−206 ft)	LP1	LMS
WHMN-LP	107.3 FM	Plymouth, Pennsylvania	135235	10	95.0 m (312 ft)	LP1	LMS
KGHW	90.7 FM	Onida, South Dakota	177344	125	65.0 m (213 ft)	A	LMS
KZLH-LP	95.7 FM	Zapata, Texas	135520	5	27.1 m (89 ft)	LP1	LMS
WGFW	88.7 FM	Drakes Branch, Virginia	174083	2,300	62.0 m (203 ft)	A	LMS
WRLP	89.1 FM	Orange, Virginia	172446	100	43.0 m (141 ft)	A	LMS
WFIJ-LP	93.9 FM	Rocky Mount, Virginia	196661	86	32.3 m (106 ft)	LP1	LMS
KQBC	90.5 FM	Benton City, Washington	174194	20	281 m (922 ft)	A	LMS
KWHJ-LP	92.3 FM	Newport, Washington	197325	10	−40.4 m (−133 ft)	LP1	LMS
WQQA	91.7 FM	Forestville, Wisconsin	175375	12,000	45 m (148 ft)	C3	LMS
WQMN	88.7 FM	Minocqua, Wisconsin	175345	40	30 m (98 ft)	A	LMS
WGBT	91.3 FM	Tomahawk, Wisconsin	176219	22,000	25 m (82 ft)	C3	LMS

=== Translators ===
Call sign	Frequency	City of license	FID	ERP (W)	HAAT	FCC info
K274BJ	102.7 FM	Springdale, AR	142099	250	54.4 m (178 ft)	LMS
K263AP	100.5 FM	Mandan, ND	148405	205	97.0 m (318 ft)	LMS
K237FQ	95.3 FM	Bismarck, ND	142184	25	39 m (128 ft)	LMS
K226CC	93.1 FM	Riddle, OR	142189	10	415.1 m (1,362 ft)	LMS
W298BV	107.5 FM	Rhinelander, WI	148633	170	28 m (92 ft)	LMS
