= XEWO-TDT =

Nueve transmitter in Guadalajara, Jalisco

- Guadalajara, Jalisco; Mexico
- Channels: Digital: 24; Virtual: 9

Programming
- Affiliations: Nueve

Ownership
- Owner: Grupo Televisa; (Televisora de Occidente, S.A. de C.V.)

History
- First air date: May 14, 1960
- Former call signs: XEWO-TV (1960–2016)
- Former channel numbers: Analog; 2 (VHF, 1960–2016)
- Former affiliations: Canal de las Estrellas (1963–2005); Canal 5 (2005-2007); Independent (2007-2020)
- Call sign meaning: Derived from XEW, its former affiliation

Technical information
- Licensing authority: CRT
- ERP: 150 kW
- HAAT: 407 m (1,335 ft)

XEWO-TDT, branded as Nueve Guadalajara, is a Nueve-affiliated television station licensed to Guadalajara, Jalisco, broadcasting on virtual channel 9. The station was a Canal de las Estrellas transmitter before switching to Canal 5 in 2005. In 2007 it made a similar swap with XHGUE (channel 21), which was a Galavisión affiliate, forming its current affiliation.

== History ==
Telesistema Mexicano launched XEZ-TV, on VHF channel 3, in 1956, from a transmitter atop the El Zamorano mountain in Santa Rosa, to cover seven states, including Jalisco. The station relayed programming from XEW and XHTV (later a Canal 5 transmitter).

In 1958, Televisora de Guadalajara, S.A. was established by Telesistema Mexicano to operate a VHF station on channel 2, under the XEWO-TV calls. The shareholders were Emilio Azcárraga Vidaurreta (commercial representative of TSM), Rómulo O'Farrill (father), Emilio Azcárraga Milmo, Rómulo O'Farrill (son), Fernando Diez Barroso and Héctor Balcázar Sdeia, with initial capital of MX$2 million. The station was preparing its final details in 1959, beginning test broadcasts from 6pm to 8pm, quickly expanding to 4pm to 9pm. Programming consisted of documentaries, shorts films and newsreels. This format continued while TSM continued its construction work for the local facilities, known as Televicentro de Guadalajara.

The license was granted to Televisora de Guadalajara, S.A., on February 19, 1960, while its regular broadcasts started on May 14.

With the station operational in its regular phase, it operated from 3pm to midnight, offering pre-recorded programs, telenovelas, musical programs, filmed series and movies, already seen on the stations in the capital and kinescoped to Guadalajara.

At the end of 1963, Telesistema announced efficiency plans for the state of Jalisco. It was decided that all local programs would move to XHG (channel 4), leaving XEWO as a full-time relay station of XEW. This affiliation continued until 2005, when it swapped affiliations with XHGA-TV. Canal 5 moved to UHF in 2007 (on XHGUE). TVT on channel 2 implied the return of local programming to this frequency. In 2008, a program featuring students of the University of Guadalajara, La Tele te Cae (TV Falls on You), aired.

From 2011 to 2020, the station was known as Más Visión, while on October 1, 2020, per an IFT order, Televisa ended its contract with Corporación Tapatía de Televisión and renamed it Nueve Guadalajara.
