= Radio Programas de México =

Mexican radio network and broadcasting company

Radio Programas de México (RPM) was a radio company of Mexico, founded by Emilio Azcárraga Vidaurreta and Clemente Serna Martínez in 1941. It was a pioneer in the expansion of Mexican radio, particularly in the creation of radio networks.

RPM, known in its final years as Radiodifusión Red, was sold to Grupo Radio Centro in 1994.

== History ==
RPM began operations on May 31, 1941, a joint venture of Monterrey broadcaster Clemente Serna Martínez, and Azcárraga, who already owned two of Mexico's most popular radio stations: XEW and XEQ. It was the first company to specialize in selling radio programs recorded on vinyl and magnetic tape. The business model of RPM was incredibly lucrative; it sold the best XEW and XEQ radio programs to stations throughout interior Mexico, offering these small stations programs they could not produce themselves as well as access to national advertising accounts and the ability to charge more for local advertising. RPM began operations with just six affiliates, but it quickly grew to 78 stations by 1945 and 92 stations for 1950, all part of the "Cadena Azul" (Blue Network). At one point more than half of all the radio stations in Mexico were affiliated to the company, which also had clients in ten Latin American countries. The international business continued to flourish into the 1950s; by 1956, RPM had 80 Latin American affiliates and had begun exporting programs to Spain.

Radio Programas de México was a milestone in the development of Mexican radio, and other affiliate services soon followed. The 1940s also saw the formation of the Cadena Radio Continental, forerunner to Grupo Radio Centro and its OIR unit; Radiodifusoras Unidas Mexicanas (RUMSA); Radiodifusoras Asociadas (RASA); the Cadena Radio Mil; Radio Cadena Nacional, based at XERCN-AM in Mexico City; and others.

In 1961, Azcárraga sold his 50 percent stake in RPM to Serna Martínez. By this time, RPM was shifting to a different business, the operation of its own radio stations. This stage of RPM's history began on January 1, 1957, when 660 AM XEBZ was relaunched as XERPM-AM. While XERPM was sold in the early 1970s to Radio Fórmula, RPM later came to operate other radio stations in Mexico City, especially after acquiring Radio Cadena Nacional in 1973 and transforming 1110 AM into a news and talk radio outlet known as Radio Red. At its height, RPM owned XERPM-AM 660, XERED-AM 1110, XEVIP-AM 1560, XHRED-FM 88.1 and XERPM-FM 103.3. In the late 1970s and 1980s, RPM shrunk in size. XERPM-FM was sold to Radio Fórmula in 1978, while XEVIP-AM was sold to Grupo Radio Centro in 1979. XHRCA-FM 91.3 would join Radio Programas de México in 1986.

The Serna family was also active in broadcasting in other cities. They owned Grupo DK, which included multiple AM stations, one FM outlet and a television station, all in Guadalajara. The original concession for XHRIO-TV in Matamoros, Tamaulipas was obtained by the Serna family, though they ultimately did not build the station.

In 1994, RPM, which in its final years changed its name to Radiodifusión Red as it became a subsidiary of the new Grupo Medcom, sold to Grupo Radio Centro; the acquisition closed in January 1996. By this time, the company had shed itself of most of the assets that were not related to its Radio Red network, owning five radio stations in total: XHRCA and XHRED-FM, XERED-AM, and XESTN-AM Monterrey and XEDKR-AM Guadalajara, which repeated Radio Red's programming. The trademarks of "Radio Programas de México" and "RPM" remain owned by Grupo Radio Centro.
