= XHGA-TDT =

Las Estrellas transmitter in Guadalajara, Jalisco

- Guadalajara, Jalisco; Mexico
- Channels: Digital: 24 (UHF); Virtual: 2

Programming
- Affiliations: 2.1 Las Estrellas; 2.2 N+ Foro

Ownership
- Owner: Grupo Televisa; (Televimex, S.A. de C.V.)

History
- First air date: March 8, 1971
- Former call signs: XHGA-TV (1971–2016)
- Former channel numbers: Analog; 9 (VHF, 1971–2016)
- Former affiliations: Televisión Independiente de México (1971–1972); Canal 5 (1972-2005)
- Call sign meaning: "Guadalajara"

Technical information
- Licensing authority: CRT
- ERP: 380,850 kW
- HAAT: 415.5 m (1,363 ft)

XHGA-TDT is a Mexican television station in Guadalajara, Jalisco, broadcasting on virtual channel 2. The station was an affiliate of the short-lived TIM network, which was absorbed into Telesistema Mexicano in 1972 to form Televisa. For over 30 years, the station was an affiliate of Canal 5, but in 2005, it exchanged formats with XEWO and became a Las Estrellas transmitter.

== History ==
In 1956, Victor Manuel Chávez y Chávez announced his intent to bid for VHF channel 8 in Guadalajara. The license was granted in 1960 using equipment and technicians from the United Kingdom. On September 14, 1965, Televisora de Jalisco was legally constituted.

On July 11, 1966, Televisión Independiente de México acquired the assets from its founder and renamed it Televisora Independiente de Jalisco, inheriting its license.

XHGA-TV was licensed under Televisión Independiente de Jalisco, a company linked to Televisión Independiente de México, on June 12, 1970, with the aim of exploiting a commercial television station on channel 9, instead of channel 8 as originally planned; IFT subsequently agreed on November 24. The station was set to use a 100kW omnidirectional antenna.

The station started broadcasting on March 8, 1971, becoming the fourth station in Guadalajara. initially limiting itself to relays from the capital from 10am to 12pm, as well as some sporting events. Regular programming started on July 29, relaying programs from XHTM, the TIM flagship in Mexico City, from 6pm to 11:15pm; the rest of its airtime consisted of local programming, the first of which was the afternoon program Club Infantil with Margarita Cerdena.

Its initial affiliation didn't last long, as the 1973 merger of the two television companies caused Televisa to control three of the four local stations. As a consequence, the station started relaying XHGC-TV from Mexico City, as Televisa decided to limit XHTIM's coverage to Mexico City.

A fire at its facilities in Condominio Guadalajara affected the station in February 1986, damaging its newly-installed transmitting equipment, which was set up ahead of the 1986 FIFA World Cup. During the 1988 Summer Olympics, locals only got to see two hours of events, using the 10pm-12am slots allocated to the XHGC network. At the time, its director-general was engineer Francisco J. Becerra, while the station aired its own programming from 7am to 4pm; from then to sign-off, the station was linked to XHGC's national network. The daytime schedule gained it the name of TV Matutina.

On January 9, 1991, the station broke from its status as relayer of Canal 5 and added more local programming, with a newscast and a sports program produced from Televicentro de Guadalajara, as the extant offices did not have the conditions to produce these programs. Shortly after, this situation changed with the station beginning to relay some programs from the local channel 4, with programs produced at Televicentro, especially aimed at children, and short updates of its news service, Al Tanto.

Since 2005, the station has been a Las Estrellas transmitter, licensed to Televimex. In 2016, it moved from digital channel 9.1 to 2.1, aligning with most of Las Estrellas' transmitters.
