= Grupo Radiorama =

Mexican radio broadcasting company

Radiorama
- Headquarters: Mexico City
- Products: Radio
- Website: www.radiorama.mx/emisoras.php

Grupo Radiorama is the largest owner and operator of radio stations in Mexico. Founded in 1970, the company operated nearly 400 radio stations in 2014.

== History ==
Radiorama was founded on December 9, 1970, by Javier Pérez de Anda and Adrián Pereda López. The two founders had previous experience at other radio groups, such as Organización Radio Centro and Radiópolis.

Radiorama started with 7 stations, but grew to 150 by 1985.

In 2003, Radiorama and Televisa Radio signed a licensing agreement whereby Radiorama stations would be incorporated into Televisa Radio networks, chiefly Los 40 Principales, W Radio and Ke Buena.

== Structure ==
Radiorama is structured unusually. While it is related to stations in almost every Mexican state, in some markets it relies on local and regional partners, some of which have their own names, such as Grupo Audiorama Baja California, Grupo AS in Tampico, Tamaulipas, Avanradio-Radiorama in Veracruz, and Respuesta Radiofónica in the state of Querétaro.

== Formats ==
Radiorama operates some of its own formats across its more than 150 stations, such as pop @FM, adult contemporary Éxtasis Digital as well as multiple grupera and Regional Mexican formats, as well as two formats sublicensed from Radiopolis, grupera La Ke Buena and Los 40. Some stations have their own local or regional formats.
