= List of radio stations in Jalisco =

This is a list of CRT-licensed radio stations located in the state of Jalisco, Mexico.

== Active ==
Call sign	Frequency	Location	Owner	Name	Format
XHED-FM	99.1 MHz	Ameca	Radio Ameca de Occidente, S.A. de C.V.	La Líder	Regional Mexican
XHUGA-FM	105.5 MHz	Ameca	Universidad de Guadalajara	Radio Universidad de Guadalajara	University radio
XHARDJ-FM	107.3 MHz	Arandas	Impulso por el Bien Común de Jalisco, S.A. de C.V.	Arandas FM	Social
XHADM-FM	88.1 MHz	Ahualulco de Mercado	Comunicación y Cultura Ahualulco de Mercado, A.C.	Más FM	Community radio
XHHE-FM	105.5 MHz	Atotonilco El Alto	Miguel Ochoa Beltrán	La Z	Regional Mexican
XHANV-FM	90.9 MHz	Autlán de Navarro	José Pablo Pérez Ramírez	Fiesta Mexicana	Regional Mexican
XHJY-FM	101.5 MHz	Autlán de Navarro	Mejor Frecuencia de Jalisco, S.A. de C.V.	La 100	Regional Mexican
XHANU-FM	102.3 MHz	Autlán de Navarro	Universidad de Guadalajara	Radio Universidad de Guadalajara	University radio
XHLD-FM	103.9 MHz	Autlán de Navarro	XELD Radio Autlán, S.A. de C.V.	Radio Costa	Regional Mexican
XEMEX-AM (Note: Combo with XHMEX-FM 104.9)	950 kHz	Ciudad Guzmán	Emisoras de Zapotlán, S.A. de C.V.	La Mexicana	Regional Mexican
XHGZ-FM	94.3 MHz	Ciudad Guzmán	Universidad de Guadalajara	Radio Universidad de Guadalajara	
XHBC-FM	95.1 MHz	Ciudad Guzmán	Radio Armonía, S.A. de C.V.	Radio Armonía	
XHPZ-FM	96.7 MHz	Ciudad Guzmán	XHPZ FM 96.7, S.A. de C.V.	Radio Sensación	
XHMEX-FM	104.9 MHz	Ciudad Guzmán	Emisoras de Zapotlán, S.A. de C.V.	La Mexicana	Regional Mexican
XHIS-FM	106.3 MHz	Ciudad Guzmán	Radio Sistema del Pacífico, S.A. de C.V.	La Rancherita 106.3	Regional Mexican
XHCGJ-FM	107.1 MHz	Ciudad Guzmán	Government of the State of Jalisco	Jalisco Radio	Public radio
XHMZA-FM	100.1 MHz	Cihuatlán	XEGUZ, S.A. de C.V.	Sol FM	Regional Mexican
XHPEEC-FM	95.7 MHz	Cihuatlán	Fomento Cultural Cihuatlán, A.C.	La Bestia Grupera	Regional Mexican
XHUGC-FM	104.7 MHz	Colotlán	Universidad de Guadalajara	Radio Universidad de Guadalajara	University radio
XHCOP-FM	95.9 MHz	Copala	Fundación Educacional de Medios, S.A. de C.V.	—N/a	—N/a
XECSAC-AM	1210 kHz	El Arenal	José Trinidad Chavira Vargas	Valles Digital Radio	Social
XECCAW-AM	1550 kHz	Encarnación de Díaz	Arturo Emilio Zorrilla Ibarra	—N/a	—N/a
XHRRR-FM	89.5 MHz	Encarnación de Díaz	Rodrigo Rodríguez Reyes	RRR 89.5	
XHPEDJ-FM	95.3 MHz	Encarnación de Díaz	Los Gallos Comunicaciones, S.A. de C.V.	Gallo FM 95.3	Regional Mexican
XHSCAJ-FM	97.5 MHz	Etzatlán	Comunicación y Cultura de Etzatlán 07, A.C.	Óptima Radio	Community radio
XHSCCR-FM	107.5 MHz	Huejúcar	Grupo Radio Huejúcar, A.C.	Radio Huejúcar	Community radio
XHLB-FM	104.7 MHz	Jamay	Radio La Barca, S.A.	Candela FM	Regional Mexican
XHJTF-FM	103.1 MHz	Zacoalco de Torres	Rodrigo Rodríguez Reyes	La Tremenda	Regional Mexican
XHSCCQ-FM	106.9 MHz	La Huerta	La Jacalera, A.C.		
XEROPJ-AM	1030 kHz	Lagos de Moreno	Radio Operadora Pegasso, S.A. de C.V.	W Radio Bajio	News/talk
XHUGL-FM	104.7 MHz	Lagos de Moreno	Universidad de Guadalajara	Radio Universidad de Guadalajara	University radio
XHLJ-FM	105.7 MHz	Lagos de Moreno	Radio Emisora Central, S.A. de C.V.	La Ke Buena	Regional Mexican
XHZAM-FM	99.1 MHz	Mazamitla	Grupo Radio Monte, A.C.	Origen Radio	
XHAN-FM	91.1 MHz	Ocotlán	Radio XEAN-AM, S.A. de C.V.	La Luperrona	Regional Mexican
XHUGO-FM	107.9 MHz	Ocotlán	Universidad de Guadalajara	Radio Universidad de Guadalajara	University radio
XECSBK-AM	650 kHz	Puerto Vallarta	Carlos Martínez Macías	Paralelo 20	News/talk
XEVAY-AM (Note: Combo with XHVAY-FM 92.7)	740 kHz	Puerto Vallarta	Radio Vallarta, S.A. de C.V.	Mix	English adult contemporary
XEPVJ-AM (Note: Combo with XHPVJ-FM 94.3)	1110 kHz	Puerto Vallarta	XEPVJ-AM, S.A. de C.V.	La Poderosa	Regional Mexican
XHPECR-FM	88.7 MHz	Puerto Vallarta	Rate Cultural y Educativa de México, A.C.	MalecónFM	Social
XHME-FM	89.5 MHz	Puerto Vallarta	Radio XHME Puerto Vallarta, S. de R.L. de C.V.	Match	Contemporary hit radio
XHCCBB-FM	89.9 MHz	Puerto Vallarta	Grupo BD Cast, S.A. de C.V.	Exa FM	Contemporary hit radio
XHPVA-FM	90.3 MHz	Puerto Vallarta	Favela Radio, S.A. de C.V.	W Radio	News/talk
XHPTOJ-FM	91.1 MHz	Puerto Vallarta	Cadena Radiópolis, S.A. de C.V.	Los 40	Contemporary hit radio
XHVJL-FM	91.9 MHz	Puerto Vallarta	Government of the State of Jalisco	Jalisco Radio	Public radio
XHVAY-FM	92.7 MHz	Puerto Vallarta	Radio Vallarta, S.A. de C.V.	Mix	English adult contemporary
XHEJ-FM	93.5 MHz	Puerto Vallarta	Operadora de Medios del Pacífico, S.A. de C.V.	La Patrona	Regional Mexican
XHPVJ-FM	94.3 MHz	Puerto Vallarta	XEPVJ-AM, S.A. de C.V.	La Poderosa	Regional Mexican
XHCCBA-FM	96.7 MHz	Puerto Vallarta	Radio Cañón, S.A. de C.V.	—N/a	—N/a
XHPVT-FM	97.5 MHz	Puerto Vallarta	Frecuencias Sociales, A.C.	Origen Radio	Variety
XHPVBB-FM	98.3 MHz	Puerto Vallarta	Compañía Periodística Sudcaliforniana, S.A. de C.V.	Radiante FM	Pop
XHFSM-FM	100.7 MHz	Puerto Vallarta	Fundación Cultural para la Sociedad Mexicana, A.C.	Radio María	Catholic radio
XHUGPV-FM	104.3 MHz	Puerto Vallarta	Universidad de Guadalajara	Radio Universidad de Guadalajara	University radio
XHGAI-FM	105.9 MHz	Puerto Vallarta	Gaia FM, A.C.	Lokura FM	Alternative rock
XHQZ-FM	94.9 MHz	San Juan de los Lagos	Sucesión de José Ismael Alvarado Robles	Ritmo 94.9	
XHPSJL-FM	96.1 MHz	San Juan de los Lagos	Grupo Radiofónico ZER	San Juan FM	Regional Mexican
XHRGO-FM	104.7 MHz	Tala	Julián Orozco González	Radio Cañaveral	
XHLAZ-FM	93.5 MHz	Tamaliagua	Voler, S.A. de C.V.	La Luperrona	Regional Mexican
XEXXX-AM (Note: Bound to XHXXX-FM 97.5, which must keep XEXXX-AM on the air until there are no listeners in its service area unserved by other radio stations.)	840 kHz	Tamazula de Gordiano	Frecuencia Modulada de Tamazula, S.A. de C.V.	Fiesta Mexicana	Regional Mexican
XHPTAM-FM	88.9 MHz	Tamazula de Gordiano	Arnoldo Rodríguez Zermeño	La Rancherita	Regional Mexican
XHXXX-FM	97.5 MHz	Tamazula de Gordiano	Frecuencia Modulada de Tamazula, S.A. de C.V.	Fiesta Mexicana	Regional Mexican
XHZK-FM	96.7 MHz	Tepatitlán de Morelos	Sistema Radio Alteña	Poder 55	
XHTMJ-FM	99.1 MHz	Tepatitlán de Morelos	Belisario Virgilio Alvarado Alvarado	Radio Aurora	
XHTEQ-FM	107.9 MHz	Tequila	Impulsa por el Bien Común de Jalisco, A.C.	Tequila FM	
XHTOJ-FM	91.5 MHz	Tomatlán	Frecuencias Sociales, A.C.	—N/a	—N/a
XHTUJ-FM	90.1 MHz	Tuxpan	Frecuencias Sociales, A.C.	—N/a	—N/a
XHZV-FM	107.9 MHz	Zapotitlán de Vadillo	Ecos de Manantlán, A.C.	Radio Zapotitlán	Community radio
XEAV-AM	580 kHz	Tlaquepaque	Radio Cañón, S.A. de C.V.	Radio Cañón + 820 AM + 1010 AM	
XEPBGJ-AM	630 kHz	Guadalajara	Government of the State of Jalisco	Jalisco Radio	Public radio
XEDKR-AM	700 kHz	Guadalajara	XEDKR-AM, S.A. de C.V.	Radio Red	
XEZZ-AM	760 kHz	Huentitán El Bajo	XEZZ, S.A. de C.V.	Radio Gallito	
XEGAJ-AM	790 kHz	Guadalajara	Transmisora Regional Radio Fórmula, S.A. de C.V.	Radio Fórmula	News/talk
XEBA-AM	820 kHz	Belisario Domínguez–Guadalajara	TV Zac, S.A. de C.V.	Radio Cañón + 580 AM + 1010 AM	
XELT-AM	920 kHz	Guadalajara	Radio Tapatía, S.A. de C.V.	Radío María	Catholic radio
XEHK-AM	960 kHz	Guadalajara	Frecuencia Radiofónica de Occidente, S.A. de C.V.	HK, La Voz de Guadalajara	
XEHL-AM	1010 kHz	San Juan de Ocotán	TV Zac, S.A. de C.V.	Radio Cañón + 580 AM + 820 AM	
XEBBB-AM	1040 kHz	Santa Ana Tepetitlán	Sociedad de Medios, S.A. de C.V.	ESNE Radio	Catholic radio
XEUNO-AM	1120 kHz	Guadalajara	Emisora 1150, S.A. de C.V.	Arre en Acustik	Regional Mexican
XEAD-AM	1150 kHz	Guadalajara	XEAD-AM, S.A. de C.V.	Radio Metrópoli	News/talk
XEDKN-AM	1230 kHz	Guadalajara	Transmisora Regional Radio Fórmula, S.A. de C.V.	Radio Fórmula Cadena Radio Uno 1230 AM	News/talk
XEDK-AM	1250 kHz	Guadalajara	Radio XEDK, S.A. de C.V.	DK 1250	News/talk
XETIA-AM	1310 kHz	Tonalá	XETIA-AM, S.A. de C.V.	Radio Vital	Health talk
XEDKT-AM	1340 kHz	Guadalajara	XEDKT-AM, S.A. de C.V.	Radiorama 1340 Frecuencia Deportiva	Sports
XEPJ-AM	1370 kHz	Tlaquepaque	XEPJ de Guadalajara, S.A. de C.V.	Apostolicus	
XEZJ-AM	1480 kHz	Guadalajara	XEZJ-AM, S.A. de C.V.	Rock and Pop	Rock
XEPBGR-AM	1510 kHz	Guadalajara	Radio de Ayuda, A.C.	Radio Miled	News/talk
XHGDL-FM	88.7 MHz	Guadalajara	Rubén Hernández Campos	@FM	Contemporary hit radio
XHGDA-FM	89.1 MHz	Guadalajara	Medios de Información de Occidente, S.A. de C.V.	La Bestia Grupera	Regional Mexican
XHBON-FM	89.5 MHz	Guadalajara	Transmisora Regional Radio Fórmula, S.A. de C.V.	Radio Fórmula Guadalajara	News/talk
XHRA-FM	89.9 MHz	Guadalajara	Frecuencia Modulada de Occidente, S.A.	Magia Digital	Regional Mexican
XHEMIA-FM	90.3 MHz	Tlaquepaque	Radio XEMIA, S. de R.L. de C.V.	Match	Contemporary hit radio
XHOY-FM	90.7 MHz	Guadalajara	Lomelí Radio, S.A. de C.V.	Señal 90	News/talk
XHGEO-FM	91.5 MHz	Guadalajara	Estéreo Mundo, S.A. de C.V.	Zona Tres	News/talk
XHESP-FM	91.9 MHz	Tlaquepaque	Radio Impulsora de Occidente, S.A. de C.V.	Rock & Soul	English rock
XHBIO-FM	92.3 MHz	Guadalajara	Radio Sistema de Occidente, S.A. de C.V.	Fiesta Mexicana	Regional Mexican
XHEAAA-FM	92.7 MHz	Santa Ana Tepetitlán	Radio Informa, S.A. de C.V.	Radio Mujer	Women's talk
XHPI-FM	93.1 MHz	Guadalajara	Radio Integral, S.A. de C.V.	Amor	Romantic
XHSC-FM	93.9 MHz	Zapopan	GIM Televisión Nacional, S.A. de C.V.	Imagen Radio	News/talk
XHDK-FM	94.7 MHz	Tlaquepaque	Radio XHDK, S.A. de C.V.	KY	Urban
XHCSFH-FM	95.1 MHz	Tlaquepaque	Resuena Medios, A.C.	—N/a	—N/a
XHRO-FM	95.5 MHz	Zapopan	Stereorey México, S.A.	La Mejor	Regional Mexican
XHABCJ-FM	95.9 MHz	Tlaquepaque	Radio Cañón, S.A. de C.V.	Vox FM	
XEJB-FM	96.3 MHz	Tlaquepaque	Government of the State of Jalisco	Jalisco Radio	Public radio
XEBA-FM	97.1 MHz	Guadalajara	Radio Tapatía, S.A. de C.V.	La Ke Buena	Regional Mexican
XETIA-FM	97.9 MHz	Guadalajara	XETIA-FM, S.A. de C.V.	Fórmula Melódica	Romantic
XHLC-FM	98.7 MHz	Guadalajara	Stereorey México, S.A.	Globo	Romantic
XHLS-FM	99.5 MHz	Guadalajara	Impulsora de Frecuencia Modulada, S.A. de C.V.	Romance	Romantic
XHKB-FM	99.9 MHz	Guadalajara	Radio Digital del Bajío XHKB, S.A. de C.V.	La Lupe	Adult hits
XHAV-FM	100.3 MHz	Guadalajara	GA Radiocomunicaciones, S.A. de C.V.	Heraldo Radio	News/talk
XHMA-FM	101.1 MHz	Zapopan	Stereorey México, S.A.	Exa FM	Contemporary hit radio
XHWK-FM	101.5 MHz	Atemajac del Valle–Guadalajara	Cadena Radiodifusora Mexicana, S.A. de C.V.	W Radio	News/talk
XEAD-FM	101.9 MHz	Guadalajara	XEAD-FM, S.A. de C.V.	La Buena Onda	
XHSCDQ-FM	102.3 MHz	Guadalajara	Comunica-Acción y Cultural del Occidente de México, A.C.	La Coyotera Radio Comunitaria	Community Radio
XEHL-FM	102.7 MHz	Guadalajara	Radio Melodía, S.A. de C.V.	Los 40	Contemporary hit radio
XHRX-FM	103.5 MHz	Cerro Grande Santa Fe, Guadalajara	XHRX-FM, S.A. de C.V.	La Tapatía	Regional Mexican
XHUDG-FM	104.3 MHz	Guadalajara	Universidad de Guadalajara	Radio Universidad de Guadalajara	University radio
XHMBM-FM	105.1 MHz	Guadalajara	Mi Gran Esperanza, A.C.	Milenio Bella Música	Classical music
XHQJ-FM	105.9 MHz	Guadalajara	XHQJ-FM, S.A. de C.V.	Éxtasis Digital	English classic hits
XHOJ-FM	106.7 MHz	Cerro Grande Santa Fe, Guadalajara	XHOJ-FM, S.A. de C.V.	Máxima FM	Rock
XHVOZ-FM	107.5 MHz	Guadalajara	Radio Voz de Guadalajara, S.A. de C.V.	RMX	Alternative

== Defunct ==
- XEPBPV-AM 1080, Puerto Vallarta
- XHPBUG-FM 89.7, San Andrés Cohamiata, Mezquitic
- XHFCT-FM 96.3, Tomatlán
