= 97.5 FM =

FM radio frequency

The following radio stations broadcast on FM frequency 97.5 MHz:

== Argentina ==
- A in Posadas, Misiones
- Beat in Córdoba
- Cadena urbana in Río Tercero, Córdoba
- Clave in Puerto Esperanza, Misiones
- Concepto in Gualeguaychú, Entre Ríos
- Europa in Paraná, Entre Ríos
- La 97.5 in El Calafate, Santa Cruz
- La Perla in Andalgalá, Catamarca
- LRG885 Loventué in Loventué, La Pampa
- LRM943 Ella in Malabrigo, Santa Fe
- LRP748 Eme in Ceres, Santa Fe
- Más in La Carlota, Córdoba
- Mega in Punta Alta, Buenos Aires
- Quiero in Calchaqui, Santa Fe
- Radio María in Benito Juárez, Buenos Aires
- Radio María in Guaminí, Buenos Aires
- Radio María in Alejo Ledesma, Córdoba
- Radio María in Villa María, Córdoba
- Radio María in La Cruz, Corrientes
- Radio María in Lamarque, Río Negro
- Radio María in Apolinario Saravia, Salta
- Radio María in Sunchales, Santa Fe
- Radio María in Firmat, Santa Fe
- Radio Municipal in San Pedro de Jujuy, Jujuy
- Vale in Buenos Aires

== Australia ==
- 2HD in Port Stephens, New South Wales
- ABC Classic in Bathurst, New South Wales
- Vision Radio Network in Sale, Victoria
- Sapphire FM in Merimbula, New South Wales

== Canada (Channel 248) ==
- CBAF-FM-20 in St. Edward, Prince Edward Island
- CBCE-FM in Little Current, Ontario
- CBEW-FM in Windsor, Ontario
- CBGA-4-FM in Lac-au-Saumon, Quebec
- CBRP-FM in Pincher Creek, Alberta
- CBRS-FM in Smithers, British Columbia
- CFFM-FM in Williams Lake, British Columbia
- CFNB-FM in D'Arcy, British Columbia
- CFXH-FM in Hinton, Alberta
- CHOX-FM in La Pocatiere, Quebec
- CHQX-FM-3 in Big River, Saskatchewan
- CHRS-FM in Cumberland House, Saskatchewan
- CIKO-FM in Carcross, Yukon
- CIQM-FM in London, Ontario
- CJAY-FM-2 in Lake Louise, Alberta
- CJKR-FM in Winnipeg, Manitoba
- CKDR-FM in Ear Falls, Hudson and Ignace, Ontario
- CKRV-FM in Kamloops, British Columbia
- CKUA-FM-15 in Lloydminster, Alberta
- CKVV-FM in Kemptville, Ontario
- VF2205 in Kemano, British Columbia
- VF2349 in Ile-a-la-Crosse, Saskatchewan
- VF2400 in Keeseekoose First Nation, Saskatchewan
- VF2513 in Avola, British Columbia
- VF2587 in Edson, Alberta
- VF7302 in Quebec City, Quebec
- VOCM-FM in St. John's, Newfoundland and Labrador

== Indonesia ==
- Motion Radio in Jakarta
- Play FM in Palembang, South Sumatra
- RRI Programa 1 in:
  - Padang, West Sumatra
  - Tanjungpinang (Riau Islands)
- RRI Programa 2 in Cirebon, West Java
- RRI Programa 4 in Palu, Central Sulawesi
- Prambors FM in Medan, North Sumatra

== Ireland ==
- Northern Sound in Carrickmacross, County Monaghan
- WLR FM in Waterford, County Waterford

== Israel ==
- Kan Gimel in Arabah, Jerusalem, the Judea and Samaria Area, Nazareth and Safed

== Malaysia ==
- Kedah FM in Kedah, Perlis, Penang and Northern Perak
- Sinar in Kuala Terengganu, Terengganu

== Mexico ==
- XHCAN-FM in Cancún, Quintana Roo
- XHCCCG-FM in Mazatlán, Sinaloa
- XHCSHX-FM in Juan Aldama, Zacatecas
- XHENG-FM in Huauchinango, Puebla
- XHFAMA-FM in El Refugio, Chihuahua
- XHHP-FM in Ciudad Victoria, Tamaulipas
- XHNOS-FM in Nogales, Sonora
- XHNT-FM in La Paz, Baja California Sur
- XHPQ-FM in León, Guanajuato
- XHPVT-FM in Puerto Vallarta, Jalisco
- XHSCAJ-FM in Etzatlán, Jalisco
- XHSIAC-FM in Xalitla, Guerrero
- XHTZI-FM in Apatzingán, Michoacán
- XHVSD-FM in Ciudad Constitución, Baja California Sur
- XHXXX-FM in Tamazula de Gordiano, Jalisco

== Morocco ==
- SNRT Amazigh in Agadir

== Philippines ==
- DWLY in Baguio City
- DWOK-FM in Olongapo City
- DWNG in Lucena City
- DYHY-FM in Puerto Princesa City
- DZOK-FM in Naga City
- FMR Catanduanes in Virac
- DYMB-FM in Iloilo City
- DYNE in Barili, Cebu
- DYFE in Tacloban City
- DXDV in Mati City
- DXOO in General Santos City
- DXBY in Tagum City
- DXZC in Kidapawan City
- DXLM in Ozamiz City
- Juander Radyo in Dipolog City
- DXMC in Iligan City
- DXMK in Butuan City
- DXBP in Tandag City

== United Kingdom ==
- Clyde 1 (Ayrshire) in Girvan
- Heart East in Southend-on-Sea
- Heartland FM in Pitlochry and Aberfeldy
- Hits Radio West Yorkshire in Bradford
- Marlow FM in Marlow
- Radio Carmarthenshire in Carmarthen and Llanelli
- Smooth North East in Tyne and Wear

== United States (Channel 248) ==
- KABX in Merced, California
- KACJ-LP in Cedar Rapids, Iowa
- KBNA in El Paso, Texas
- KBVU in Alta, Iowa
- KDBH in Natchitoches, Louisiana
- KDEE-LP in Sacramento, California
- KDKK in Park Rapids, Minnesota
- KDLY in Lander, Wyoming
- KDMI-LP in Canton, Texas
- KDOA-LP in Vancouver, Washington
- KEXL in Pierce, Nebraska
- KFNC in Mont Belvieu, Texas
- KFTX in Kingsville, Texas
- KGKL-FM in San Angelo, Texas
- KHCM in Honolulu, Hawaii
- KHUG-LP in Castaic, California
- KIDH-LP in Meridian, Idaho
- KJCK in Junction City, Kansas
- KJMO in Linn, Missouri
- KKCT in Bismarck, North Dakota
- KLAK in Tom Bean, Texas
- KLMX-FM in Clayton, New Mexico
- KLQS-LP in San Fernando, California
- KLSB in Goleta, California
- KLYY in Riverside, California
- KMOD in Tulsa, Oklahoma
- KMVA in Dewey-Humboldt, Arizona
- KNDN-FM in Shiprock, New Mexico
- KNLR in Bend, Oregon
- KNMO-FM in Nevada, Missouri
- KNXR in Rochester, Minnesota
- KOEA in Doniphan, Missouri
- KOLW in Basin City, Washington
- KOTF-LP in Hayden, Idaho
- KOZB in Livingston, Montana
- KPPS-LP in St. Louis Park, Minnesota
- KQLO-LP in Clarksville, Arkansas
- KQSK in Chadron, Nebraska
- KQUS in Hot Springs, Arkansas
- KSHL in Lincoln Beach, Oregon
- KSRX in Sterling, Colorado
- KSZR in Oro Valley, Arizona
- KTBB-FM in Troup, Texas
- KTJZ in Tallulah, Louisiana
- KTRT in Winthrop, Washington
- KVEG in Mesquite, Nevada
- KVEX-LP in St. Cloud, Minnesota
- KWAP-LP in Florissant, Missouri
- KWTX in Waco, Texas
- KWUZ in Poncha Springs, Colorado
- KXXN in Iowa Park, Texas
- KYAB-LP in Abilene, Texas
- KYMI in Charlo, Montana
- KYSF in Bonanza, Oregon
- KZGZ in Agana, Guam
- KZLF in Alva, Oklahoma
- KZNS-FM in Coalville, Utah
- WABD in Mobile, Alabama
- WAGI-LP in Kankakee, Illinois
- WALK in Patchogue, New York
- WAMZ in Louisville, Kentucky
- WBBA-FM in Pittsfield, Illinois
- WBWE-LP in Wilkes Barre, Pennsylvania
- WCER in Delhi, New York
- WCOS in Columbia, South Carolina
- WDDH in Saint Marys, Pennsylvania
- WDIF-LP in Marion, Ohio
- WDLJ in Breese, Illinois
- WFBB-LP in Glen Saint Mary, Florida
- WFHP-LP in Fort Kent, Maine
- WFRY in Watertown, New York
- WHAZ in Hoosick Falls, New York
- WHDG in Rhinelander, Wisconsin
- WHLJ-FM in Statenville, Georgia
- WHMS in Champaign, Illinois
- WHMV-LP in Mohawk, New York
- WIOB in Mayaguez, Puerto Rico
- WJIM in Lansing, Michigan
- WJXB-FM in Knoxville, Tennessee
- WKGA in Goodwater, Alabama
- WKLT in Kalkaska, Michigan
- WKTT in Salisbury, Maryland
- WLAW-FM in Whitehall, Michigan
- WLCI-LP in Nelsonville, Ohio
- WLLX in Lawrenceburg, Tennessee
- WLTF in Martinsburg, West Virginia
- WNRC-LP in Dudley, Massachusetts
- WOBN in Westerville, Ohio
- WOKQ in Dover, New Hampshire
- WONE in Akron, Ohio
- WPCV in Winter Haven, Florida
- WPEN in Burlington, New Jersey
- WQBE in Charleston, West Virginia
- WQOK in Carrboro, North Carolina
- WQSK in Madison, Maine
- WRQP-LP in Bennettsville, South Carolina
- WRRA in Bridgman, Michigan
- WRSK-LP in Newton, New Jersey
- WTGR in Union City, Ohio
- WTNN in Bristol, Vermont
- WUFF in Eastman, Georgia
- WUMJ in Fayetteville, Georgia
- WVNU in Greenfield, Ohio
- WVRV in Pine Level, Alabama
- WWMS in Oxford, Mississippi
- WWNP-LP in North Port, Florida
- WWWV in Charlottesville, Virginia
- WYLA-LP in Charleston, South Carolina
- WZOK in Rockford, Illinois
- WZZP in Hopkinsville, Kentucky
- WZUP in Washington, North Carolina

== Vietnam ==
- Dong Nai radio, Dong Nai province
