= 950 AM =

AM radio frequency

The following radio stations broadcast on AM frequency 950 kHz: The Federal Communications Commission categorizes 950 AM as a regional frequency.

== Argentina ==
- CNN Radio Argentina in Buenos Aires
- LT16 RSP in Presidente Roque Saenz Peña

== Brazil ==
- ZYH 593 in Sobral, Ceará
- ZYH 915 in João Lisboa, Maranhão
- ZYL 212 in Belo Horizonte, Minas Gerais
- ZYI 681 in Sousa, Paraíba
- ZYI 923 in Padre Marcos, Piauí
- ZYK 260 in Lajeado, Rio Grande do Sul
- ZYK 510 in Vera Cruz, São Paulo

== Canada ==
Call sign	City of license	Daytime power kW	Nighttime power kW	Transmitter coordinates
CFAM	Altona, Manitoba	10	10	49.03249°N 97.94916°W

== Mexico ==
- XEFA-AM in Chihuahua, Chihuahua
- XEKAM-AM in Rosarito, Baja California
- XEMAB-AM in Ciudad del Carmen, Campeche
- XEMEX-AM in Ciudad Guzmán, Jalisco
- XEOJN-AM in San Lucas Ojitlán, Oaxaca

== United States ==
Call sign	City of license	Facility ID	Class	Daytime power kW	Nighttime power kW	Transmitter coordinates
KAHI	Auburn, California	48341	B	5	5	38.857778°N 121.0275°W
KCAP	Helena, Montana	8669	B	5	5	46.674444°N 112.018056°W
KDCE	Espanola, New Mexico	56215	D	4.2	0.08	36.002222°N 106.066389°W
KFSA	Fort Smith, Arkansas	22413	B	1	0.5	35.432778°N 94.470278°W
KJR	Seattle, Washington	48386	B	50	50	47.433333°N 122.467222°W
KJRG	Newton, Kansas	35021	D	0.5	0.147	38.044167°N 97.3725°W
KKSE	Parker, Colorado	30839	B	5	5	39.875°N 104.933333°W
KMHR	Boise, Idaho	49721	D	3.5	0.035	43.627778°N 116.507778°W
KNFT	Bayard, New Mexico	28125	D	5	0.224	32.780833°N 108.199444°W
KOEL	Oelwein, Iowa	28475	B	5	0.5	42.655833°N 91.900556°W
KOZE	Lewiston, Idaho	140	B	5	1	46.392222°N 117.034167°W
KPRC	Houston, Texas	9644	B	7	4.3	29.805278°N 95.278611°W
KTBR	Roseburg, Oregon	33247	D	3.4	0.02	43.168889°N 123.374444°W
KTNF	St. Louis Park, Minnesota	57833	B	1	1	44.868889°N 93.419722°W
KTTU	Lubbock, Texas	55061	B	5	0.5	33.582222°N 101.825556°W
KWAT	Watertown, South Dakota	60856	B	1	1	44.87°N 97.113611°W
KWOS	Jefferson City, Missouri	9927	B	5	0.5	38.520278°N 92.178333°W
KXJK	Forrest City, Arkansas	22054	D	5	0.087	34.981389°N 90.8575°W
WAKM	Franklin, Tennessee	22365	D	5	0.075	35.906111°N 86.905833°W
WBES	Charleston, West Virginia	6873	B	5	1	38.386389°N 81.714167°W
WCDC	Moncks Corner, South Carolina	4817	B	10	6	33.205556°N 80.064444°W
WCLB	Sheboygan, Wisconsin	36423	D	0.5	0.011	43.7425°N 87.816667°W
WCTN	Potomac-Cabin John, Maryland	59711	D	2.5	0.35	39.036667°N 77.2025°W
WERL	Eagle River, Wisconsin	4907	D	1	0.051	45.975556°N 89.245556°W
WGUN	Valdosta, Georgia	70511	D	3.5	0.063	30.803611°N 83.355556°W
WHSY	Hattiesburg, Mississippi	61237	D	5	0.064	31.375833°N 89.330278°W
WHVW	Hyde Park, New York	41870	D	0.5	0.057	41.746611°N 73.912778°W
WIBX	Utica, New York	168	B	5	5	43.103333°N 75.341944°W
WIXZ	Steubenville, Ohio	73769	D	1	0.035	40.446944°N 80.568333°W
WKDN	Philadelphia, Pennsylvania	25095	B	43	21	39.974444°N 75.271944°W (daytime); 40.154167°N 75.369444°W (nighttime)
WORD	Spartanburg, South Carolina	66390	D	5	0.065	34.981389°N 81.987222°W
WORL	Orlando, Florida	48731	B	12	5	28.535556°N 81.448889°W
WPET	Greensboro, North Carolina	71271	D	0.54	0.041	36.061667°N 79.793056°W
WROC	Rochester, New York	71205	B	1	1	43.106944°N 77.5975°W
WROL	Boston, Massachusetts	9139	D	5	0.09	42.435833°N 70.993056°W
WSFS	Chicago, Illinois	6589	B	1	5	41.860833°N 87.686667°W (daytime); 41.636667°N 87.552778°W (nighttime)
WWJ	Detroit, Michigan	9621	B	50	50	42.019167°N 83.239722°W
WXGI	Richmond, Virginia	74207	D	3.9	0.045	37.514444°N 77.507778°W
WXLW	Indianapolis, Indiana	60206	D	1	0.013	39.851389°N 86.244444°W
WZKD	Montgomery, Alabama	12321	D	1	0.045	32.421389°N 86.164444°W
