= Jalisco TV =

Public television network of the Mexican state of Jalisco

Coordinates: 20°35′57″N 103°21′56″W

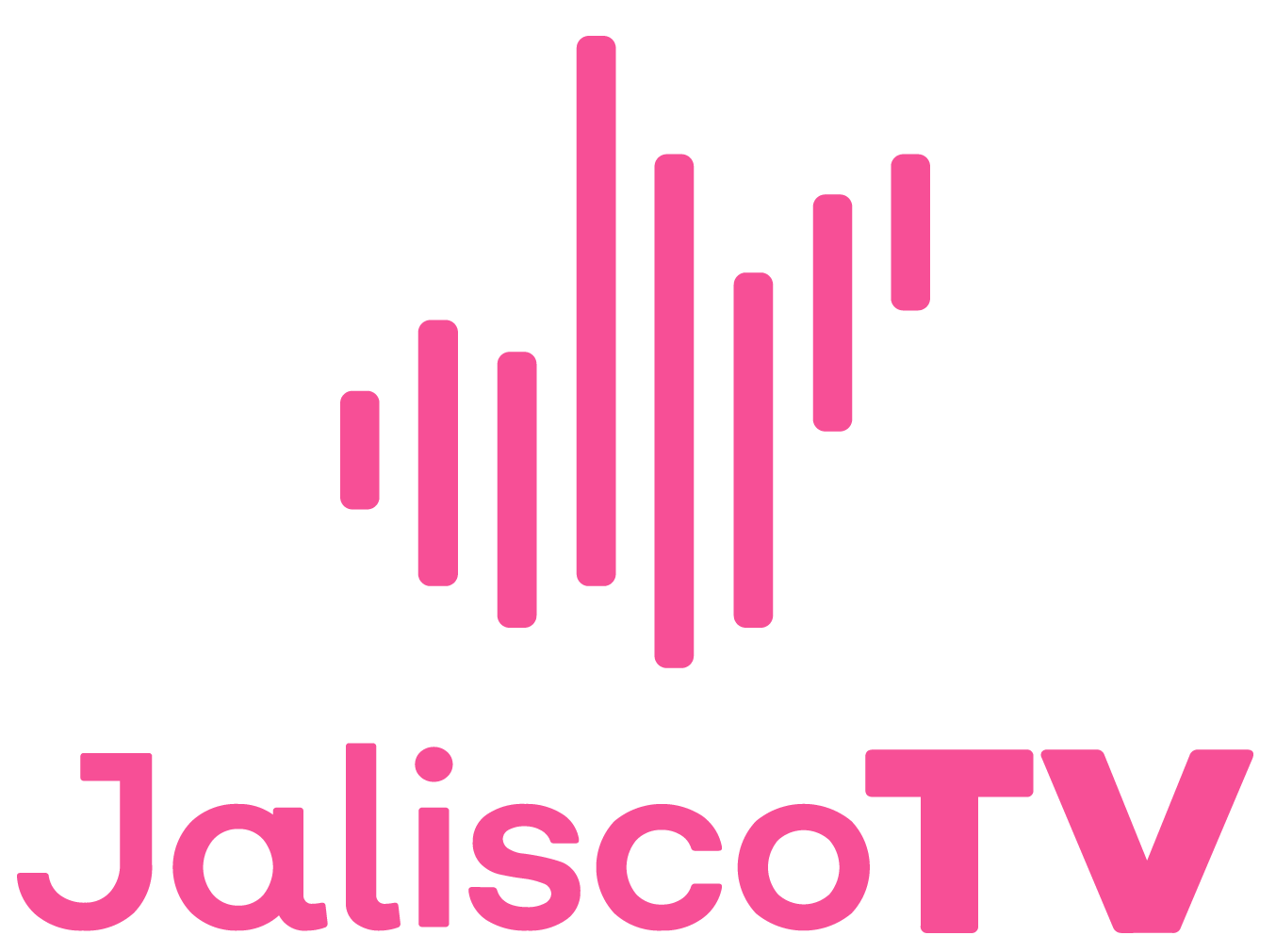
- Country: Mexico
- Broadcast area: State of Jalisco
- Headquarters: Guadalajara, Jalisco

Ownership
- Owner: Sistema Jalisciense de Radio y Televisión (SJRTV)

History
- Founded: December 5, 1979
- Launched: January 16, 1991

Links
- Website: jaliscotv.com

Jalisco TV, virtual channel 17, is the public television network of the Mexican state of Jalisco, operated by the Sistema Jalisciense de Radio y Televisión alongside XEPBGJ-AM and XEJB-FM and broadcasting on transmitters in Guadalajara, Ciudad Guzmán and Puerto Vallarta. Its programming is primarily cultural and educational content.

== History ==
The first governor of the state of Jalisco to consider the possibility of opening a state-owned television station was Juan Gil Preciado in 1960. However, plans did not start to actually build one until 30 years later.

On January 16, 1991, XHGJG-TV on analog channel 7 took to the air under the Department of Cultural Broadcasters, taking the institutional name Sistema Jalisciense de Radio, Televisión y Cinematografía (Jalisco System of Radio, Television, and Film). The original transmitter and facilities were housed on the tenth floor of the Education Tower along with a 6,000-watt transmitter. That night it broadcast its first news program, the newscast Actualidad Informativa, which had as its first top story the beginning of Operation Desert Storm. Not long after, it was moved from the state Secretariat of Education and Culture to the Secretariat of Culture upon its separation, taking the name Sistema Jalisciense de Radio y Televisión and losing the film component. At this time the station only broadcast several hours of programming per day in the evening, slowly expanding to additional timeslots.

An earthquake in June 1994 in Guadalajara forced the state's Guadalajara radio stations, XEJB-AM and XEJB-FM, to move to the Casa de la Cultura Jalisciense. On October 11, 1995, XHGJG joined them, as another earthquake two days prior caused serious damage to the Education Tower and the station had to relocate. In the late 1990s, the transmitters of all three stations were moved to Cerro del Cuatro, home of other Guadalajara radio and TV station transmitters, further increasing the stations' coverage.

In September 1999, the state government received a permit to sign on the first rebroadcaster of XHGJG, low-powered XHGZG-TV channel 12 in Ciudad Guzmán with a transmitter on Cerro de la Escalera. This began a period of growth for the station, which later moved to the Edificio México in Guadalajara and signed on a third transmitter, XHGPV-TV on channel 13 in Puerto Vallarta. The network became known as C7, a shortening of "Canal 7", a brand later extended to the state's radio stations.

The Guadalajara station began digital multicasting in November 2014 with four subchannels: news-oriented C7 Noticias, cultural C7 Cultura, C7 Congreso covering the activities of the Legislature of Jalisco, and C7 Ley with coverage of the state judicial system. The first two appeared in November 2014. The last two were discontinued soon after their appearance.

On July 22, 2019, the state network was relaunched under the name Jalisco TV. The concessions were reissued with new call signs on January 1, 2022, due to a discontinuity.

== Transmitters ==
Jalisco TV programming is broadcast on three transmitters in Jalisco, as well as by satellite.

RF	VC	Call sign	Location	ERP
24	17	XHCPEH-TDT	Ciudad Guzmán	3.19 kW
25	17	XHCPEI-TDT	Guadalajara	135.55 kW
17	17	XHCPEJ-TDT	Puerto Vallarta	23.37 kW

In March 2018, in order to facilitate the repacking of TV services out of the 600 MHz band (channels 38–51), XHGPV was assigned channel 21 for continued digital operations.

== Digital television ==
In November 2014, XHGJG-TDT began multicasting two subchannels, adding two more in early 2015 (and later removing them). Analog channel 7 aired subchannel 25.2, C7 Cultura, which was also the HD subchannel (25.1/17.1 was C7 Noticias). In 2016, authorization was obtained to carry these subchannels on the Ciudad Guzmán and Puerto Vallarta transmitters.

On July 22, 2019, transmissions began of a third subchannel, the new Canal Parlamento, owned and operated by the Jalisco state legislature, which was initially authorized for the Guadalajara transmitter. Coinciding with the Jalisco TV relaunch, the station changed its channels to a more conventional configuration, with the .2 subchannel becoming a one-hour timeshift feed.

Channel	Video	Aspect	Short name	Programming
17.1	1080i	16:9	XHGJG	Jalisco TV
17.2	480i	16:9	XHGJG	Jalisco TV -1 hour
17.3	480i	4:3		Canal Parlamento

XHGJG shut off its analog signal on December 16, 2015, along with other Guadalajara stations.

== Newscasts ==
Jalisco TV produces five hours a day on weekdays of news programs, with a three-hour morning newscast at 6 am and hour-long newscasts at 3 pm and 9 pm.
