= 1210 AM =

AM radio frequency

The following radio stations broadcast on AM frequency 1210 kHz: 1210 AM is a United States clear-channel frequency. WPHT Philadelphia is the dominant Class A station on 1210 AM.

== In Argentina ==
- Del Promesero in José C Paz, Buenos Aires
- LRI229 in Las Flores

== In Canada ==
Call sign	City of license	Daytime power (kW)	Nighttime power (kW)	Transmitter coordinates
CFYM	Kindersley, Saskatchewan	1	0.25	51.451389°N 109.145556°W

== In Mexico ==
- XECOPA-AM in Copainalá, Chiapas
- XECSAC-AM in El Arenal, Jalisco
- XEPUE-AM in Puebla, Puebla

== In the United States ==
Stations in bold are clear-channel stations.

Call sign	City of license	Facility ID	Class	Daytime power (kW)	Nighttime power (kW)	Critical hours power (kW)	Unlimited power (kW)	Transmitter coordinates
KGYN	Guymon, Oklahoma	65152	B	22	10			36.676111°N 101.382778°W
KHAT	Laramie, Wyoming	10333	B	10	1			41.255278°N 105.550278°W
KMIA	Auburn-Federal Way, Washington	33683	B	27.5	0.22			47.305556°N 122.248056°W
KOKK	Huron, South Dakota	15268	B	5	0.87			44.362222°N 98.1525°W
KPRZ	San Marcos-Poway, California	54461	B	20	10			33.069444°N 117.193056°W
KQEQ	Fowler, California	33252	B	5	0.37			36.770556°N 119.922222°W (daytime); 36.660278°N 119.683611°W (nighttime)
KRPU	Rocklin, California	20930	D	5	0.08			38.462778°N 121.130278°W (daytime); 38.728889°N 121.319167°W (nighttime)
KRSV	Afton, Wyoming	72020	B	5	0.25			42.722778°N 110.960833°W
KUBR	San Juan, Texas	51960	B	10	5			26.244722°N 98.090278°W (daytime); 26.243889°N 98.090278°W (nighttime)
KZOO	Honolulu, Hawaii	52914	B				1	21.294722°N 157.863611°W
WANB	Waynesburg, Pennsylvania	32211	D	5		0.71		39.87°N 80.133611°W
WDAO	Dayton, Ohio	31880	D	1				39.726667°N 84.206389°W
WHOY	Salinas, Puerto Rico	29229	B	5	5			17.977222°N 66.303889°W
WILY	Centralia, Illinois	26624	D	10	0.003	1.1		38.481944°N 89.148889°W (daytime and critical hours); 38.524444°N 89.134167°W (nighttime)
WJNL	Kingsley, Michigan	4599	D	10		2.5		44.559444°N 85.593611°W
WMPS	Bartlett, Tennessee	2802	B	10	0.25			35.261111°N 89.830556°W
WNMA	Miami Springs, Florida	61642	B	47	2.5			25.9°N 80.363611°W
**WPHT**	Philadelphia, Pennsylvania	9634	A				50	39.979444°N 74.986944°W
WSBI	Static, Tennessee	25973	D	10		2.5		36.622778°N 85.0875°W
WTXK	Pike Road, Alabama	63946	D	10	0.003	5		32.2925°N 86.217222°W
