= KIDH =

KIDH may refer to:

- KIDH-LP, a low-power radio station (97.5 FM) licensed to serve Meridian, Idaho, United States
- KGCL, a radio station (90.9 FM) licensed to serve Jordan Valley, Oregon, United States, which held the call sign KIDH from 2003 to 2008
