= KURM (AM) =

Currently broadcasting
- Rogers, Arkansas; United States
- Broadcast area: Fayetteville (North West Arkansas)
- Frequency: 790 kHz

Programming
- Format: News Talk Information/Brokered programming

Ownership
- Owner: Lykins Broadcasting, LLC

History
- First air date: April 30, 1980 (first license granted) (hiatus 2024 to 2026)
- Call sign meaning: KURM phonetic for Kermit, first name of original owner Kermit Womack

Technical information
- Licensing authority: FCC
- Facility ID: 34266
- Class: B
- Power: 5,000 watts day 500 watts night
- Transmitter coordinates: 36°18′10″N 94°6′47″W
- Translators: K248DM (97.5 MHz, Huntsville)

Links
- Public license information: Public file; LMS
- Webcast: https://479.media/kurm
- Website: https://479.media/kurm

KURM (790 AM) is a radio station broadcasting both News Talk Information and Brokered programming formats. Licensed to Rogers, Arkansas, United States, it serves the Fayetteville (North West Arkansas) area. The station is currently owned by Lykins Broadcasting, LLC. 790 kHz is a Regional broadcast frequency.

== History ==
KURM was established on November 9, 1979 by owner Kermit Womack. It ceased operations on July 1, 2024 at 5:15 pm. The final song played on KURM-AM on that day was Give the World a Smile by Cathedral Quartet.

The KURM-AM license was assigned to Lykins Broadcasting, LLC, on January 30, 2026 with local broadcast operations resuming on July 28, 2026.
