= 790 AM =

AM radio frequency

The following radio stations broadcast on AM frequency 790 kHz: The Federal Communications Commission classifies 790 AM as a regional broadcast frequency.

== In Argentina ==
- LR6 Mitre in Buenos Aires
- LRA22 in San Salvador de Jujuy, Jujuy
- LV19 in Malargüe, Mendoza

== In Canada ==
No stations in Canada currently use the frequency. CFCW in Camrose, Alberta, was the last station to do so but moved to 840 AM on August 1, 2015.

== In Mexico ==
- XEFE-AM in Nuevo Laredo, Tamaulipas
- XEGAJ-AM in Guadalajara, Jalisco
- XENT-AM in La Paz, Baja California Sur
- XERC-AM in Mexico City
- XESU-AM in Mexicali, Baja California

== In the United States ==
Call sign	City of license	Facility ID	Class	Daytime power (kW)	Nighttime power (kW)	Unlimited power (kW)	Transmitter coordinates
KABC	Los Angeles, California	33254	B	6.6	7.9		34.019444°N 118.345556°W
KBET	Winchester, Nevada	136292	B	0.5			36.11°N 115.002222°W
KBME	Houston, Texas	32082	B	5	5		29.915°N 95.461667°W
KCAM	Glennallen, Alaska	49563	B			5	62.114444°N 145.535278°W
KEJY	Eureka, California	19840	B	0.5	0.34		40.8025°N 124.138889°W
KFGO	Fargo, North Dakota	34421	B	5	5		46.718056°N 96.801389°W
KFPT	Clovis, California	29429	B	5	2.5		36.844167°N 119.686944°W
KFYO	Lubbock, Texas	61151	B	5	1		33.463889°N 101.925°W
KGHL	Billings, Montana	50354	B	5	1.8		45.824722°N 108.410556°W
KGMI	Bellingham, Washington	34467	B	5	1		48.721944°N 122.445278°W
KJRB	Spokane, Washington	11235	D	4.4	0.034		47.502222°N 117.385278°W
KNST	Tucson, Arizona	53589	B	5	0.5		32.248333°N 111.008333°W
KSPD	Boise, Idaho	35627	D	1	0.061		43.565833°N 116.336944°W
KURM	Rogers, Arkansas	34266	B	5	0.5		36.302778°N 94.113056°W
KWIL	Albany, Oregon	837	B	1	1		44.631667°N 123.015833°W
KXXX	Colby, Kansas	37125	D	5	0.024		39.393056°N 101.001667°W
WAEB	Allentown, Pennsylvania	14371	B	3.6	1.5		40.660278°N 75.513889°W
WAMM	Mount Jackson, Virginia	60106	D	1	0.04		38.770833°N 78.621389°W
WAXY	South Miami, Florida	30837	B	5	5		25.756667°N 80.639444°W
WAYY	Eau Claire, Wisconsin	7062	B	5	0.123		44.829722°N 91.446667°W
WBLO	Thomasville, North Carolina	54552	D	10	0.026		35.961389°N 80.036944°W
WETB	Johnson City, Tennessee	44050	D	5	0.072		36.328611°N 82.410833°W
WGRA	Cairo, Georgia	38639	D	1	0.11		30.902222°N 84.234167°W
WHTH	Heath, Ohio	57937	D	1	0.026		40.051389°N 82.468889°W
WKRD	Louisville, Kentucky	53587	B	5	1		38.192778°N 85.520556°W
WLBE	Leesburg-Eustis, Florida	73202	B	5	1		28.828333°N 81.786111°W
WLSV	Wellsville, New York	19709	D	1	0.041		42.076944°N 77.929722°W
WMC	Memphis, Tennessee	19185	B	5	5		35.168611°N 89.885°W
WNIS	Norfolk, Virginia	4671	B			5	37.073611°N 76.291944°W
WNTC	Ashland City, Tennessee	64336	D	2	0.035		36.285556°N 87.083333°W
WPIC	Sharon, Pennsylvania	60005	D	1.3	0.058		41.219444°N 80.473611°W
WPNN	Pensacola, Florida	43135	D	1	0.066		30.4525°N 87.240556°W
WPRV	Providence, Rhode Island	64840	B	5	5		41.834167°N 71.365556°W
WQXI	Atlanta, Georgia	30825	B	28	1		33.811667°N 84.353611°W
WRMS	Beardstown, Illinois	13649	D	0.5	0.055		40.003056°N 90.3975°W
WSFN	Brunswick, Georgia	29131	D	0.5	0.115		31.144444°N 81.582222°W
WSGW	Saginaw, Michigan	22674	B	5	1		43.461111°N 83.813333°W
WTNY	Watertown, New York	154	B	1	1		43.945556°N 75.948333°W
WTSK	Tuscaloosa, Alabama	54795	D	5	0.036		33.188056°N 87.589722°W
WVCD	Bamberg-Denmark, South Carolina	23323	D	1	0.1		33.313889°N 81.078611°W
