= WLSV =

- Wellsville, New York; United States
- Broadcast area: Olean area
- Frequency: 790 kHz
- Branding: 100.3 FM and 790 AM WLSV

Programming
- Format: Country music
- Affiliations: ABC Radio

Ownership
- Owner: Dbm Communications, Inc.

History
- First air date: 1955
- Call sign meaning: WLSV Wellsville

Technical information
- Licensing authority: FCC
- Facility ID: 19709
- Class: D
- Power: 1,000 watts day 41 watts night
- Transmitter coordinates: 42°04′37″N 77°55′47″W
- Translators: 100.3 MHz - W262DJ, (Wellsville)

Links
- Public license information: Public file; LMS
- Website: wlsv.simdif.com

WLSV (790 AM) is a radio station broadcasting a country music format. Licensed to Wellsville, New York, United States, the station serves the Olean area. The station is currently owned by Dbm Communications, Inc. and features programming from ABC Radio's Real Country format.

790 AM is a regional broadcast frequency. The station operates on greatly reduced power at night, having previously been a daytime-only station. The station, Allegany County's oldest broadcast license, has operated since 1955.
