= KPRZ =

Christian talk radio station in San Marcos-Poway, California

Coordinates: 33°04′10.1″N 117°11′38.1″W

- San Marcos–Poway, California; United States
- Broadcast area: San Diego metropolitan area
- Frequency: 1210 kHz
- Branding: K-Praise 106.1 and 1210

Programming
- Format: Christian talk and teaching
- Affiliations: Salem Radio Network; SRN News

Ownership
- Owner: Salem Media Group; (New Inspiration Broadcasting Company, Inc.)
- Sister stations: KCBQ

History
- First air date: 1986 (40 years ago)
- Former call signs: KNEF (9/1984–12/1984)
- Call sign meaning: K PRaiZe (praise; on air name)

Technical information
- Licensing authority: FCC
- Facility ID: 54461
- Class: B
- Power: 20,000 watts daytime, 10,000 watts nighttime
- Translator: 106.1 K291CR (Encinitas)

Links
- Public license information: Public file; LMS
- Webcast: Listen Live
- Website: kprz.com

KPRZ (1210 kHz "K-Praise 106.1 and 1210") is a commercial AM radio station licensed to San Marcos–Poway, California and serving the San Diego metropolitan area. It is owned by the Salem Media Group and broadcasts a Christian talk and teaching radio format. National religious leaders heard on KPRZ include David Jeremiah, Jim Daly, Chuck Swindoll and Charles Stanley. Secular conservative talk hosts include Eric Metaxas, Charlie Kirk and Jay Sekulow. The studios and offices are on Towne Centre Drive in San Diego.

By day, KPRZ is powered at 20,000 watts. But 1210 AM is a clear channel frequency, so to reduce interference at night to other stations, KPRZ cuts its power to 10,000 watts. KPRZ has a directional signal using a three-tower array. The transmitter site is on Canyon de Oro Drive near the San Elijo Hills. Programming is also heard on a 250 watt FM translator, K291CR at 106.1 MHz, in Encinitas.

== History ==
This station received a construction permit on May 8, 1984. On September 12, the station was assigned the call sign KNEF, only to change to the current KPRZ call letters on December 18. KPRZ signed on in the summer of 1986 with a Christian radio format.

In late 2005, the station was put up for sale. On December 16 that year, it was announced that the Salem Media Group (through licensee New Inspiration), would acquire the station. It was approved on December 22, and the sale was consummated on February 23, 2006.

In August 2018, KPRZ received a translator, using the call sign K291CR. K291CR rebroadcasts KPRZ's programming to the North County area on 106.1 FM at 250 watts, the maximum power rating allowed for a translator.
