= XHPBUG-FM =

Radio station in San Andrés Cohamiata, Jalisco, Mexico

Defunct
- San Andrés Cohamiata, Mezquitic Municipality, Jalisco, Mexico; Mexico
- Frequency: 89.7 FM

Programming
- Format: Indigenous radio

Ownership
- Owner: Universidad de Guadalajara

History
- First air date: January 12, 2017 (concession received)
- Last air date: February 15, 2021 (surrender)
- Call sign meaning: PABF Universidad de Guadalajara

Technical information
- Class: A
- ERP: 1 kW
- HAAT: 476.3 m
- Transmitter coordinates: 22°11′19.17″N 104°14′27.93″W

XHPBUG-FM was a radio station on 89.7 FM in San Andrés Cohamiata, Mezquitic Municipality, Jalisco. The station was owned by the Universidad de Guadalajara and operated locally with indigenous programming as a semi-satellite of its statewide network.

== History ==
XHPBUG received its concession on January 12, 2017, and initially planned to come on air in June, though program testing did not begin until January 2018. The station was the first public station in the country to broadcast almost entirely in an indigenous language, in this case Wixárika.

XHPBUG operated from the local facilities of the UDG Virtual University System, but most of its programming would be presented locally, and the university planned for the station to gain a degree of autonomy over time. The new station was also intended to serve as a complement for a planned bachillerato program in the town.

In 2019, XHPBUG was approved to increase its effective radiated power from 130 watts to 1,000.

On February 15, 2021, the Universidad de Guadalajara surrendered the concession. It cited bad electrical service from the Comisión Federal de Electricidad with frequent voltage spikes that resulted in repeated damage to electrical equipment and had required two replacements of the uninterruptible power supply.
