= XHVSD-FM =

Radio station in Ciudad Constitución, Baja California Sur

- Ciudad Constitución, Baja California Sur; Mexico
- Frequency: 97.5 FM
- Branding: La Señal del Progreso

Ownership
- Owner: Promomedios California; (María Guadalupe Espinoza Piedrín)

History
- First air date: January 18, 1971 (concession)

Technical information
- Licensing authority: CRT
- Class: B1
- ERP: 25 kW
- HAAT: 43.3 m (142 ft)
- Transmitter coordinates: 25.012453°N 111.663479°W

XHVSD-FM is a United States radio station on 97.5 FM in Ciudad Constitución, Baja California Sur.

== History ==
XEVSD-AM 1440 received its concession on January 18, 1971. It was the first radio station in Baja California Sur outside of La Paz.

In 1988, XEVSD was approved to move to 930 kHz, but it never built the facilities and remained on 1440.

XEVSD was authorized to move to FM in February 2011 and moved there in 2012.
