= XEBBB-AM =

Radio station in Guadalajara, Jalisco

Currently silent
- Santa Ana Tepetitlán, Zapopan, Jalisco; Mexico
- Broadcast area: Guadalajara metropolitan area
- Frequency: 1040 kHz

Ownership
- Owner: Promomedios; (Sociedad de Medios, S.A. de C.V.)
- Sister stations: XHBIO-FM, XHGEO-FM, XHEAAA-FM

History
- First air date: February 24, 1972 (concession)
- Former call signs: XECX-AM

Technical information
- Class: B
- Power: 10,000 watts day/1,000 watts night
- Transmitter coordinates: 20°38′02.6″N 103°26′27.7″W

Links
- Webcast: Listen live

XEBBB-AM is a radio station on 1040 AM in Guadalajara, Jalisco, Mexico. It is owned by Promomedios and is currently silent.

== History ==
XEBBB received its concession on February 24, 1972 as XECX-AM. The 5 kW daytimer broadcast from Zapopan and was owned by Jorge González Velasco. The callsign changed to XEBBB-AM in late 1979. XEBBB was later sold to Radio Cosmos, S.A. and then to its current concessionaire.

At the start of September 2018, XEAAA-AM 880 and XEBBB exchanged formats, with the Catholic ESNE Radio format moving to 1040 and RadioMujer women's talk moving to 880 AM. This was done in order to migrate Radio Mujer to FM.

XEBBB-AM went silent in late February 2026.
