= XHED-FM =

Radio station in Ameca, Jalisco, Mexico

- Ameca, Jalisco; Mexico
- Broadcast area: Región Valles
- Frequency: 99.1 FM
- Branding: La Líder (The Leader)

Programming
- Format: Regional Mexican

Ownership
- Owner: Sandra López Benavides, Laura Enriqueta, María Teresa, Marcela, Tomás Salvador, María del Carmen, Gabriela and Aurelio López Rocha, Héctor Quirarte Gutiérrez, Héctor and Lucia Quirarte López

History
- First air date: 1959

Technical information
- Licensing authority: CRT
- Class: AA
- ERP: 6,000 watts (FM)
- HAAT: −88.9 m (−292 ft)
- Transmitter coordinates: 20°30′46″N 104°01′58″W

Links
- Webcast: Listen live
- Website: lalider.mx

XHED-FM is a radio station on 99.1 FM in Ameca, Jalisco. XHED is locally owned and carries a format of Regional Mexican music with news, known as La Líder, with programming targeted to the Valles region of Jalisco.

== History ==
Tomás Flores Lamas received the concession for XEED-AM 1490 on January 9, 1959. XEED broadcast with 1,000 watts day and 250 at night. In 1969, Salvador López Chávez bought XEED; in the 1990s, his estate upgraded XEED to 1,000 watts full-time on 1450 kHz, and in 2002 to the same power on 900 kHz.

XEED migrated to FM in 2011 and was later transferred to its current concessionaires in 2012.

In 2017, XHED was approved to move its transmitter, but not to change frequencies or increase power. A power increase on 99.1 MHz could not be approved without causing interference to XHZAM-FM in Mazamitla. The station activated the upgraded facilities in 2018 and began programming 24 hours a day, 7 days a week.
