= XHEAAA-FM =

Radio station in Guadalajara, Jalisco, Mexico

- Santa Ana Tepetitlán, Zapopan, Jalisco; Mexico
- Broadcast area: Guadalajara metropolitan area
- Frequency: 92.7 MHz (HD Radio)
- Branding: Radio Mujer

Programming
- Format: Women's talk

Ownership
- Owner: Promomedios; (Radio Informa, S.A. de C.V.)
- Sister stations: XHBIO-FM, XHGEO-FM, XEBBB-AM

History
- First air date: May 18, 1965 (concession); September 5, 2018 (FM)
- Former call signs: XETZ-AM, XEAAA-AM
- Former frequencies: 880 kHz (1947–2019)

Technical information
- Licensing authority: CRT
- Class: A
- ERP: 3 kW
- HAAT: 26.6 meters (87 ft)
- Transmitter coordinates: 20°38′02.6″N 103°26′27.8″W

Links
- Website: www.radiomujer.com.mx

XHEAAA-FM is a radio station on 92.7 FM in Santa Ana Tepetitlán, located in the municipality of Zapopan, Jalisco, Mexico. It is owned by Promomedios.

== History ==
XETZ-AM received its concession on May 18, 1965. The Tequila-based station was owned by Julio Romo Valdivia and broadcast as a daytimer with 1,000 watts. In 1970, XETZ was sold to XETZ Radio Felicidades, S.A.

In 1979, XETZ became XEAAA-AM, the first in a series of triple-letter stations owned by Promomedios along with XEBBB-AM 1040, and later, XECCC-AM 1440. It also raised its power to 10,000 watts.

In the 1990s and 2000s, XEAAA (frequently pronounced X-E-Triple A) had a series of news/talk formats. In 2011, it became Ultra, with an adult contemporary format (previously aired by XHGEO-FM 91.5) operated by the company of the same name.

In 2013, XEAAA flipped to a Catholic radio format sourced from ESNE Radio, making it the only ESNE station in Mexico.

At the start of September 2018, XEAAA and XEBBB exchanged formats, with ESNE Radio moving to 1040 and RadioMujer moving to 880 AM, because XEAAA had been selected to migrate to FM as XHEAAA-FM 92.7. The FM station began test broadcasts on September 5, 2018, with full programming scheduled to begin on FM on the 10th.
