= XHENG-FM =

Radio station in Huauchinango, Puebla

Huauchinango, Puebla, Mexico; Mexico
- Frequency: 97.5 MHz
- Branding: Ke Buena

Programming
- Format: Grupera
- Affiliations: Radiópolis

Ownership
- Owner: Radio Nueva Generación, S.A.

History
- First air date: December 13, 1960 (concession)
- Call sign meaning: From Huauchinango or original concessionaire Natividad Rodríguez G. de Torres

Technical information
- ERP: 6 kW
- HAAT: -66.15 meters
- Transmitter coordinates: 20°10′03.89″N 98°02′51.4″W

XHENG-FM is a radio station on 97.5 FM in Huauchinango, Puebla, Mexico.

== History ==
XENG-AM 1240 received its concession on December 13, 1960. The 1,000-watt station was owned by Natividad Rodríguez G. de Torres. Radio Nueva Generación, S.A. acquired the concession in 1991, and it moved to 870 in the 1990s.

Until 2015, XHENG carried the grupera format from Grupo Siete and was consequently known as La Jefa and La Única. It did not stay with the format when it renamed to Bengala and kept the La Única name.

XENG was cleared to move to FM in 2011.
