= DXTM =

N93 (DXTM)
Jimenez; Philippines
- Broadcast area: Central Misamis Occidental
- Frequency: 93.3 MHz
- Branding: N93

Programming
- Languages: Cebuano, Filipino, English
- Format: Contemporary MOR, OPM

Ownership
- Owner: M.I.T. Radio Television Network
- Sister stations: Radio One 97.5 Ozamiz

History
- First air date: 2010
- Former names: Radio One (2010–2020)

Technical information
- Licensing authority: NTC
- Power: 5 kW

N93 (DXTM 93.3 MHz) is an FM station owned and operated by M.I.T. Radio Television Network. Its studios and transmitter are located at Brgy. Sta. Cruz, Jimenez, Misamis Occidental.
