= XHNOS-FM =

Radio station in Nogales, Sonora (1993–2013)

Nogales, Sonora; Mexico
- Broadcast area: Nogales, Sonora
- Frequency: 97.5 FM
- Branding: Láser 97.5

Programming
- Format: Silent

Ownership
- Owner: Jesús Barrón Tapia; (Radios Kino, S.A. de C.V.)

History
- First air date: March 4, 1993 (concession)
- Last air date: May 29, 2013
- Call sign meaning: Nogales, Sonora

Technical information
- ERP: 1.61 kW

Links
- Website: stereolaser97.blogspot.com

XHNOS-FM was a radio station on 97.5 FM in Nogales, Sonora. The station was owned by Radios Kino, S.A. de C.V. and went silent in May 2013 due to strike action; its concession expired in March 2020.

== History ==
XHNOS began with a concession awarded to Radios Kino on March 4, 1993.

At 3pm on May 29, 2013, the workers of XHNOS went on strike. The employees, backed by Mexico's broadcasting labor union STIRT, alleged that they had not received pay or benefits. The strike had not been resolved as of October 2015.
