= WTXK =

- Pike Road, Alabama; United States
- Broadcast area: Montgomery, Alabama
- Frequency: 1210 kHz
- Branding: ESPN The Ticket

Programming
- Format: Sports
- Affiliations: ESPN Radio; Troy Trojans; Motor Racing Network; Performance Racing Network

Ownership
- Owner: Stroh Communications; (Frontdoor Broadcasting, LLC)
- Sister stations: WVRV

History
- First air date: October 5, 1968
- Former call signs: WAYD (1968–1988); WFSF (1988–1993); WQLS (1993–2010)
- Former frequencies: 1190 kHz (1968–1987); 1200 kHz (1987–2002)

Technical information
- Licensing authority: FCC
- Facility ID: 63946
- Class: D
- Power: 10,000 watts day 5,000 watts critical hours 3 watts night
- Transmitter coordinates: 32°17′33″N 86°13′02″W
- Translator: 107.5 W298BC (Montgomery)

Links
- Public license information: Public file; LMS
- Webcast: Listen Live
- Website: www.espntheticket.com

WTXK (1210 AM, "The Ticket") is a sports-formatted radio station licensed to Pike Road, Alabama, United States, and serving nearby Montgomery. The station, established in 1968, is currently owned and operated by Frontdoor Broadcasting, LLC as part of a duopoly with Contemporary Christian station WVRV (97.5 FM). Both stations share studios on Carmichael Way in eastern Montgomery, while its transmitter facilities are located between Montgomery and Pike Road.

WTXK serves as the flagship station of the Troy Trojans and as a local affiliate of NASCAR racing via Motor Racing Network and Performance Racing Network. Programming includes syndicated programming from ESPN Radio.

In addition to the 1210 AM frequency, WTXK also broadcasts its programming on translator W298BC (107.5 FM) licensed to Montgomery. That station broadcasts from a transmitter at the studios of local television stations WAKA-TV, WNCF, and WBMM along Harrison Road in Montgomery.

== History ==
=== The 1190 years ===
This station began regular broadcast operations on October 5, 1968, as a 1,000 watt daytime-only AM station at 1190 kHz known as WAYD under the ownership of Wade B. Sullivan. WAYD aired a country & western music format through the entire 1970s.

In October 1981, Wade B. Sullivan reached an agreement to sell WAYD to RJG Communications, owned by Raymond F. Akin, Gordon L. Bostic, and J.A. Baxter Jr. The deal was approved by the FCC on December 3, 1981. RJG Communications in turn agreed in February 1983 to sell this station to MSB Communications, Inc. The deal was approved by the FCC on April 8, 1983.

Just over two years later, in August 1985, MSB Communications, Inc., contracted to sell this station to HS Communications, Inc. The deal was approved by the FCC on September 18, 1985, and the transaction was consummated on February 10, 1986.

=== The 1200 years ===
WAYD received a construction permit on June 16, 1986, that authorized a move from 1190 kHz to 1200 kHz and a power increase to 10,000 watts during the day and to 2,500 watts during critical hours operation. The station received its license to cover this move and upgrade on April 20, 1987.

In October 1988, HS Broadcasting, Inc., reached an agreement to sell this station to Wesley R. Morgan. The deal was approved by the FCC on November 10, 1988, and the transaction was consummated on December 29, 1988. On December 9, 1988, the new owners had the FCC change the station's call letters to WFSF.

In March 1989, Wesley R. Morgan agreed to transfer the broadcast license for WFSF to the Morgan Broadcasting Limited Partnership. The transfer was approved by the FCC on April 21, 1989, and the transaction was consummated on May 2, 1989. This ownership change would prove short-lived as in April 1990 Morgan Broadcasting Limited Partnership agreed to sell this station to Sunrise Broadcasting Corp. The deal was approved by the FCC on June 21, 1990, and the transaction was consummated on June 29, 1990. Internal corporate shifts saw the license transferred to Sunrise Broadcasting of Alabama, Inc., in August 1991.

On July 9, 1993, the station was assigned the WQLS callsign.

=== The 1210 years ===
WQLS was granted a new construction permit in July 1995 that authorized an increase in critical hours signal power to 5,000 watts and the addition of nighttime broadcasting at 35 watts but necessitating another frequency shift, this time to the current 1210 kHz. The station began broadcasting at the new frequency in March 1997, but did not receive the license to cover the change from the FCC until July 12, 2002.

In September 1995, Sunrise Broadcasting of Alabama, Inc., reached an agreement to sell this station to Woods Communications Group, Inc. The deal was approved by the FCC on November 21, 1995, and the transaction was consummated on January 20, 1996.

In March 2000, Jimmy Jarrell of Auburn, Alabama, reached an agreement to purchase news-talk formatted WQLS from Woods Communication Group Inc. of Dothan, Alabama (Carl Blackmon, secretary/treasurer) for a reported sale price of $12,000. The deal gained FCC approval on 2000-05-02 and the transfer was consummated on 2000-06-20.

In May 2002, Styles Broadcasting Inc. (Kim Styles, CEO) reached an agreement to purchase country music formatted WJRL-FM and gospel music formatted WQLS from Jimmy Jarrell for a reported sale price of $750,000. The deal gained FCC approval on June 24, 2002, and the transfer was consummated on 2002-08-01.

In December 2006, Horizon Broadcasting Company reached an agreement to purchase WQLS from Magic Broadcasting, LLC., for a reported $125,000. The deal gained FCC approval on January 16, 2007, and the transfer was consummated on April 24, 2007. Horizon operated WQLS as a "full Gospel radio station" with a Gospel music format until it went off-the-air in late January 2008 due to a fire.

=== Dark times ===
In August 2008, Hughey Communications, Inc. (owned by Randall and Debra Hughey) agreed to purchase this dark station from Wayne North's Horizon Broadcasting Company for a reported sale price of $50,000 in cash. The FCC approved the deal on November 19, 2008, and the transaction was consummated on January 26, 2009.

On December 30, 2008, WQLS applied to the FCC for special temporary authority to broadcast with reduced power (1,000 watts daytime and critical hours, 3 watts at night) from temporary facilities at the existing tower site. The station had been destroyed by a fire and was off the air for almost all of 2008. If the station had not returned to the air by January 28, 2009, they risked the automatic forfeiture of their broadcast license for remaining silent for more than 12 months. The FCC granted this temporary authority on January 6, 2009, with a scheduled expiration of July 6, 2009. The station filed for an extension of this authority in March 2009 which the FCC finally granted on December 17, 2009, with a scheduled expiration of January 29, 2010.

=== New city, new owner, new format ===
On May 13, 2009, the station applied to change its community of license from Ozark, Alabama, near Dothan, to Pike Road, Alabama, near Montgomery. The FCC granted a construction permit for this relocation on November 20, 2009, with a scheduled expiration of November 20, 2012. With construction and testing complete, the station was granted an updated broadcast license for the Pike Road location on February 22, 2010.

License holders Hughey Communications, Inc., reached an agreement to sell WQLS to Frontdoor Broadcasting, LLC, in December 2009. The FCC approved the deal on January 19, 2010. The transaction was consummated on January 28, 2010. The new owners had the FCC change the station's call sign to WTXK on March 12, 2010. The call sign was changed to match the station's new branding as "The Ticket", a sports talk format that took effect in late March 2010. The move also resulted in WTXK simulcasting its new programming on FM translator W298BC (107.5 FM) in Montgomery.
