= XHGEO-FM =

Radio station in Guadalajara, Jalisco, Mexico

Simulcast of XEBBB-AM 1040
- Guadalajara, Jalisco; Mexico
- Frequency: 91.5 FM
- Branding: Zona Tres

Programming
- Language: Spanish
- Format: News/talk

Ownership
- Owner: Grupo Promomedios; (Estéreo Mundo, S.A. de C.V.)
- Sister stations: XHBIO-FM, XHEAAA-FM, XEBBB-AM

History
- First air date: January 16, 1970 (concession)
- Former call signs: XHJL-FM (1970-79)
- Call sign meaning: GEO (station was known as Estéreo Mundo)

Technical information
- Licensing authority: CRT
- Class: C1
- ERP: 99.07 kW
- HAAT: 51 meters (167 ft)
- Transmitter coordinates: 20°39′4.98″N 103°23′49.61″W

Links
- Webcast: Listen live
- Website: zona3.mx

XHGEO-FM is a radio station on 91.5 FM in Guadalajara, Jalisco, Mexico. The station is owned by Grupo Promomedios and carries a news/talk format known as Zona Tres.

== History ==
XHGEO received its first concession on January 16, 1970 and was known as Estéreo Mundo, broadcasting mostly instrumental and beautiful music. It later branded as 91-X with a pop format and as Factor 91. In 2006 it became adult contemporary Ultra FM. That format moved to XEAAA-AM 880 in 2011, making way for Zona Tres.
