= XHCAN-FM =

Radio station in Cancún, Quintana Roo, Mexico

- Cancún, Quintana Roo; Mexico
- Frequency: 97.5 FM (HD Radio)
- Branding: Máxima

Programming
- Format: Top 40 (CHR)

Ownership
- Owner: Radio S.A.; (Roberto Martínez Vara y López Portillo)

History
- Former frequencies: 107.5 FM (to 2014), 97.5 FM (November 2014-April 2015), 97.7 FM (April 2015-September 22, 2016)
- Call sign meaning: Cancún

Technical information
- ERP: 3 kW

Links
- Webcast: Listen live
- Website: maxplay.com.mx

XHCAN-FM is a radio station in Cancún, Quintana Roo, Mexico. It broadcasts on 97.5 FM and is known as Máxima with a pop format.

== History ==
On September 3, 1982, the Secretary of Communications and Transport published an accord in the Diario Oficial de la Federación making available for commercial use XHCAN-FM on 107.5 MHz in Cancún, Quintana Roo. Out of several bidders for the frequency, in November, Roberto Martínez Vara y López Portillo was selected to proceed to obtain a concession for the station.

However, several concessionaires objected. Given that the concessionaire of the station was the nephew of José López Portillo, the outgoing president of Mexico, media watchers and the rival suitors for the station raised the alarm. Proceso quipped that "the government of José López Portillo ended as it began". Five concessionaires objected after the awarding of the concession to Vara y López Portillo, with four of them also expressing concern in a letter to the SCT in 1995. The case now went through the Mexican court system.

In 1997, two court rulings in Mexico City and Quintana Roo offered Vara y López Portillo an amparo to continue with the process of applying for the concession. In an administrative resolution dated May 12, 1997, the SCT denied the concession, on the grounds that the applicant "did not guarantee the social interest" by proceeding to install and operate the radio station. Vara y López Portillo and the SCT battled in the courts. In 2002, the General Directorate for Radio, Television and Film, part of SEGOB, advised the SCT that it felt that commercial operation of a radio station without concession or permit did not affect the social interest. Thus, in June 2003, the SCT upheld its initial 1997 resolution, but the court battle continued to drag on, as courts declared various resolutions null and void.

Finally, in 2010, the concession was obtained and the station signed on as "Cancún FM 107.5". It moved to 97.5 MHz in November 2014, 97.7 MHz in April 2015, and back to 97.5 on September 22, 2016. Radio S.A. operates the station.
