= XHSIAC-FM =

Community radio station in Guerrero, Mexico

- Xalitla, Tepecoacuilco de Trujano Municipality, Guerrero; Mexico
- Frequency: 97.5 FM
- Branding: Radio Xalitla

Programming
- Format: Indigenous community radio

Ownership
- Owner: Comunidad Indígena de Xalitla, Guerrero

History
- First air date: 2015
- Former frequencies: 91.3 FM (as a pirate)
- Call sign meaning: (templated callsign)

Technical information
- Class: A

Links
- Website: XHSIAC-FM on Facebook

XHSIAC-FM is a community radio station on 97.5 FM owned by the indigenous community of Xalitla, Guerrero, a town in the municipality of Tepecoacuilco de Trujano.

== History ==
Broadcasts began in 2015 as a pirate station. The Indigenous Community of Xalitla, Guerrero filed for an indigenous station on May 12, 2017. The station award was approved on December 12, 2018. Upon receiving the concession on February 26, 2019, the newly named XHSIAC moved from its pirate frequency of 91.3 MHz to 97.5.
