= WVCD =

- Bamberg-Denmark, South Carolina; United States
- Frequency: 790 kHz

Programming
- Format: Urban Contemporary; Urban Gospel; Christian talk and teaching

Ownership
- Owner: Voorhees College

History
- First air date: March 15, 1993 (as WRIT)
- Former call signs: WRIT (1993–2004)
- Call sign meaning: W Voorhees College, Denmark

Technical information
- Facility ID: 23323
- Class: D
- Power: 1,000 watts day 100 watts night
- Transmitter coordinates: 33°18′50″N 81°4′43″W

Links
- Website: Voorhees.edu/WVCD

WVCD (790 kHz) is a non-commercial AM radio station licensed to both Bamberg, South Carolina, and Denmark, South Carolina. The station is owned by historically black Voorhees College. The college is affiliated with the Episcopal Church and has its campus in Denmark, SC. WVCD is partially run by students and has a radio format which includes urban contemporary, urban gospel, and Christian talk and teaching programs.

By day, WVCD is powered at 1,000 watts. But to reduce interference to other stations on 790 AM, at night, it reduces power to 100 watts. It uses a non-directional antenna at all times.

== History ==
The station went on the air as WRIT on 1993-03-15. On 2004-01-30, the station changed its call sign to the current WVCD.
