= WOBN =

Coordinates: 40.125°N 82.935°W

- Westerville, Ohio; United States
- Broadcast area: Westerville, Ohio
- Frequency: 97.5 MHz

Programming
- Format: Campus radio

Ownership
- Owner: Otterbein University

History
- Founded: 1948 as carrier current WOBC
- First air date: 1958
- Call sign meaning: Otterbein Broadcasting Network

Technical information
- Licensing authority: FCC
- Facility ID: 50761
- Class: D
- ERP: 29 watts
- HAAT: 20 meters (66 ft)

Links
- Public license information: Public file; LMS
- Webcast: Listen live
- Website: tandcmedia.org/section/wobn

WOBN is an American college radio station owned and operated on 97.5 FM by Otterbein University in Westerville, Ohio. The station's studio is located at 33 Collegeview Road and tower is located at Cowan Hall on the campus of Otterbein.

The station began operations in 1948 as a carrier current AM station with the callsign of WOBC. In 1958, the station's programming moved to the FM band on 91.5 FM. In 1977 the station started stereo broadcasts. In 1983, the station changed frequencies to 105.7 MHz - a frequency located within the current commercial portion of the FM band. In 1989, the FCC required that Otterbein relinquish the commercial frequency to make room for a new commercial station in Marysville (now licensed to Hilliard as WXZX). In 1990, WOBN-FM moved to the frequency of 101.5 MHz. In November 2008 WOBN moved once again to the present frequency of 97.5.

== Programming ==
Because WOBN is a student-run college radio station, its lineup and content change frequently as new students enter and experienced students graduate. In addition to WOBN's formatted music programming, the station's mission statement includes supporting local athletes and early airplay of major and independent label new releases.

WOBN-FM is the voice for all Otterbein football, basketball, and baseball teams, as well as many of Westerville's other local sports.
