= WVNU =

- Greenfield, Ohio; United States
- Frequency: 97.5 MHz
- Branding: Pure Rock 97.5

Programming
- Format: Classic rock
- Affiliations: Westwood One

Ownership
- Owner: Total Media Group Inc.

History
- First air date: May 1, 1994

Technical information
- Licensing authority: FCC
- Facility ID: 61331
- Class: A
- ERP: 2,300 watts
- HAAT: 164.0 meters (538.1 ft)
- Transmitter coordinates: 39°24′28.00″N 83°21′15.00″W

Links
- Public license information: Public file; LMS
- Webcast: Listen live
- Website: yourtotalmedia.com/wvnu/

WVNU (97.5 FM) is a radio station licensed to Greenfield, Ohio, United States. The station is currently owned by Total Media Group and airs a classic rock format. WVNU also broadcasts local sports games.

On February 13, 2026, WVNU changed their format from soft adult contemporary to classic rock, branded as "Pure Rock 97.5".
