= Give the World a Smile =

"Give the World a Smile" was the theme song for the Stamps Quartet, and probably the first Southern gospel song to become a “gold record.”

== Composition ==
According to Otis Deaton, in November 1924, he and M. L. Yandell were students at the Stamps School of Music in Jacksonville, Texas. Yandell wrote a tune and asked James Rowe if he would write words for it. Rowe was not able to come up with suitable words, so Yandell asked Deaton, and Deaton wrote lyrics called “Keep the Song Wave Rolling On,” but when they showed this song to V. O. Stamps, he pointed out that there was already a similar song by H. W. Elliott. Deaton then wrote the lyrics for “Give the World a Smile.” V. O. paid each of them $5.00 cash for the song.

In about 1954, Mr. Deaton taught a singing school in the Mt. Zion community, which is about 5 miles east of Commerce, Texas on state Highway 11 in the Rae's Chapel Methodist Church building. At that time he told the group that he and Mr. Yandell were each paid $9.00 for the song.

Mr. Deaton also told an interesting story about giving piano lessons to a young Marion Snyder, who came for his lessons riding a spotted pony. Marion Snyder's playing of "Give the World a Smile" is the quintessential rendition of that song in the minds of many in the Southern Gospel field.

== First recording ==
Deaton’s recollection concludes, “So I never sold the words nor assigned them to anyone. I gave V. O. permission to print the song. The next year, 1925, the Stamps Quartet recorded it on Victor label, and that’s how ‘Give the World a Smile’ was born. The Stamps Quartet was the first Gospel Quartet to record on Victor Label, which became RCA Victor label. The Stamps Quartet recorded 'Give The World A Smile' and the recording sold over one million records. www.thestampsquartet.com 'Give The World A Smile'.

== Lyrics ==
The basic lyrics for the chorus are:

Give the world a smile each day

Helping someone on life's way

From the paths of sin bring the wanderers in

To the master's home to stay

Help to cheer the lone and sad

Help to make some pilgrim glad

Let your life so be that all the world might see

that you are serving Jesus with a smile.

== Recordings ==
The song, as sung by the Corley Family (in a style that might be called "folk-primitive")can be heard on-line. More recently it has been recorded by a number of different Gospel quartets, and it is still the theme song of the Stamps Quartet.

A version of the song was recorded in 2000 by James Blackwood.
