= XHQZ-FM =

Radio station in San Juan de los Lagos, Jalisco

- San Juan de los Lagos, Jalisco; Mexico
- Frequency: 94.9 FM
- Branding: Ritmo 720

Programming
- Format: Pop

Ownership
- Owner: Sistema Radio Alteña; (Sucesión de José Ismael Alvarado Robles)
- Sister stations: XHZK-FM

History
- First air date: April 17, 1970 (concession)

Technical information
- Class: CRT
- Power: AA
- ERP: 6 kW
- HAAT: 96.16 m (315.5 ft)
- Transmitter coordinates: 21°13′19″N 102°22′14″W

Links
- Website: radiotepatitlan.com

XHQZ-FM is a radio station on 94.9 FM in San Juan de los Lagos, Jalisco. It is known as Ritmo 94.9.

== History ==
XEQZ-AM 1540 received its concession on April 17, 1970. It was owned by José Ismael Alvarado Robles and later moved to 720 kHz, with power staying at 1 kW day.

XEQZ was authorized to move to FM in 2011.
