= CHRS-FM =

Radio station in Saskatchewan, Canada

Coordinates: 53°56′40″N 102°14′13″W

- Cumberland House, Saskatchewan; Canada
- Frequency: 97.5 MHz
- Branding: Rez Radio

Programming
- Format: First Nations community radio

Ownership
- Owner: Cumberland House Cree Nation

History
- First air date: November 27, 2003

Technical information
- ERP: 43 watts
- HAAT: 33 metres

Links
- Website: chcn.ca/programs-and-services/radio-station/

CHRS-FM is a First Nations community radio station that broadcasts at 97.5 FM in Cumberland House, Saskatchewan, Canada.

CHRS-FM is owned by the Cumberland House Cree Nation.
