= XHMEX-FM =

Radio station in Ciudad Guzmán, Jalisco, Mexico

XHMEX-FM / XEMEX-AM
- Ciudad Guzmán, Jalisco; Mexico
- Frequencies: 104.9 FM; 950 AM
- Branding: La Mexicana

Programming
- Format: Regional Mexican

Ownership
- Owner: Grupo Radiorama; (Emisoras de Zapotlán, S.A. de C.V.)

History
- First air date: December 3, 1970 (concession); 1994 (FM)
- Former call signs: XELW-AM
- Call sign meaning: "La Mexicana"

Technical information
- ERP: 0.894 kW
- Transmitter coordinates: (FM) 19.701703°N 103.465148°W

Links
- Webcast: Listen live
- Website: radiorama.mx

XHMEX-FM/XEMEX-AM is a radio station on 950 AM and 104.9 FM in Ciudad Guzmán, Jalisco. It is owned by Grupo Radiorama and carries a Regional Mexican format known as La Mexicana.

== History ==
XELW-AM 1510 received its concession on December 3, 1970. It was owned by Francisco Barragán Figueroa and broadcast with 5,000 watts. By the 1980s, it was moved to 950 kHz and taken on the XEMEX calls. XHMEX-FM was officially authorized in 1994. It was transferred to Emisoras de Zapotlán in 1999.

The 950 AM transmitter is located on the Ciudad Guzmán-Guadalajara highway, while the FM station broadcasts from the studios in central Ciudad Guzmán.
