= XEDKN-AM =

Radio station in Guadalajara

- Guadalajara, Jalisco; Mexico
- Frequency: 1230 kHz
- Branding: Radio Fórmula (Segunda Cadena)

Programming
- Format: News/talk

Ownership
- Owner: Radio Fórmula; (Transmisora Regional Radio Fórmula, S.A. de C.V.)
- Sister stations: XEGAJ-AM, XHBON-FM

History
- First air date: August 5, 1988 (concession)
- Former call signs: XEZAJ-AM (1988–2002)
- Former frequencies: 1220 kHz (1988–2006)
- Call sign meaning: DK Noticias

Technical information
- Licensing authority: CRT
- Class: C
- Power: 1 kW day/0.25 kW night
- Transmitter coordinates: 20°40′36.3″N 103°21′15.8″W

Links
- Website: https://radioformulaguadalajara.com/

XEDKN-AM is a radio station on 1230 AM in Guadalajara, Jalisco. It is owned by Radio Fórmula and carries its news and talk programming.

== History ==
XEZAJ-AM 1220, to be located in Zapopan, received its concession on August 5, 1988. It was owned by Radiorama through concessionaire Mensajes Musicales, S.A. Radiorama sold it to Radio Fórmula in 2002 after changing the callsign to XEDKN-AM, and in 2006, it moved to 1230 kHz.
