= KHUG-LP =

- Castaic, California; United States
- Frequency: 97.5 MHz
- Branding: KHUG 97.5 FM

Ownership
- Owner: Sloan Canyon Communications

History
- First air date: July 10, 2015
- Former call signs: KZPC-LP (2015–2017)

Technical information
- Licensing authority: FCC
- Facility ID: 196070
- Class: L1
- ERP: 100 watts
- HAAT: 30 meters (98 ft)
- Transmitter coordinates: 34°29′52.00″N 118°38′15.60″W

Links
- Public license information: LMS
- Webcast: Listen live
- Website: khug.rocks

KHUG-LP (97.5 FM) is a low power radio station licensed to Castaic, California, United States. It is owned by Sloan Canyon Communications, a California non-profit corporation, and serves the Santa Clarita Valley.

== History ==
Sloan Canyon Communications was granted a construction permit by the FCC on July 10, 2015. The first broadcast occurred January 20, 2017, as it signed on as KZPC-LP. Three days later, when the FCC granted a pending call sign change to KHUG-LP, the station started using the new call sign on January 24, 2017.

The station programs primarily music, using the slogan, "Classic Rock By Day, Blues and R&B by night." The station claims that 15 to 20% of its evening blues and R&B rotation is made up of local artists.
