= XHSCAJ-FM =

Radio station in Etzatlán, Jalisco, Mexico

- Etzatlán, Jalisco; Mexico
- Broadcast area: San Marcos-San Juanito de Escobedo
- Frequency: 97.5 FM
- Branding: Optima Radio

Programming
- Format: Community radio

Ownership
- Owner: Comunicación y Cultura de Etzatlán 07, A.C.

History
- First air date: December 15, 2018
- Call sign meaning: (templated call sign)

Technical information
- Licensing authority: CRT
- Class: A
- ERP: 2,000 kW
- HAAT: −115 m (−377 ft)

Links
- Website: XHSCAJ-FM on Facebook

XHSCAJ-FM is a community radio station on 97.5 FM in Etzatlán, Jalisco. The station is owned by the civil association Comunicación y Cultura de Etzatlán 07, A.C.

== History ==
Comunicación y Cultura de Etzatlán 07 filed for a community station on October 3, 2016. The IFT approved its award on October 22, 2018.
