= WLCI-LP =

- Nelsonville, Ohio; United States
- Frequency: 97.5 MHz
- Branding: 97.5 The Fix

Ownership
- Owner: Hocking Technical College

Technical information
- Licensing authority: FCC
- Facility ID: 131994
- Class: L1
- ERP: 100 watts
- HAAT: 13.0 meters
- Transmitter coordinates: 39°26′38.00″N 82°13′32.00″W

Links
- Public license information: LMS

WLCI-LP (97.5 FM) is a campus radio station licensed to Nelsonville, Ohio. The station is owned by Hocking Technical College. WLCI-LP is a student-run station, based out of the Hocking College School of Music in Southeast Ohio. The station is operated entirely by students in the Hocking College School of Music Program.

The license was cancelled on October 2, 2020, for failure to file a license renewal, but was reinstated on October 6, 2020, upon the Federal Communications Commission receiving the renewal application.
