= WDLJ =

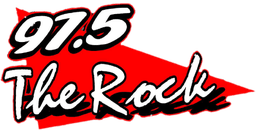
- Breese, Illinois; United States
- Frequency: 97.5 MHz
- Branding: 97.5 The Rock

Programming
- Format: Classic rock

Ownership
- Owner: KM Communications; (KM Radio of Breese, LLC)

History
- First air date: February 10, 2003

Technical information
- Licensing authority: FCC
- Facility ID: 78414
- Class: A
- ERP: 2,500 watts
- HAAT: 156 meters (512 ft)
- Transmitter coordinates: 38°36′33.2″N 89°23′35.3″W

Links
- Public license information: Public file; LMS
- Webcast: Listen live
- Website: wdljfm.com

WDLJ (97.5 FM, "97.5 The Rock") is a radio station broadcasting a classic rock format. Licensed to Breese, Illinois, United States, the station is currently owned by KM Radio of Breese, LLC.

97.5 The Rock has been in existence since February 10, 2003.
