= XHRA-FM =

Radio station in Guadalajara, Jalisco, Mexico

- Guadalajara; Mexico
- Frequency: 89.9 MHz
- Branding: Magia Digital

Programming
- Format: Regional Mexican

Ownership
- Owner: MegaRadio; (Frecuencia Modulada de Occidente, S.A.)
- Sister stations: XHLS-FM, XHESP-FM

History
- First air date: 1972
- Former frequencies: 89.1 MHz (1972–1981)
- Call sign meaning: RAfael J. Rubio González (original concessionaire)

Technical information
- Licensing authority: CRT
- Class: B1
- ERP: 14.22 kW
- HAAT: 71.2 meters (234 ft)
- Transmitter coordinates: 20°41′07.2″N 103°23′24.9″W

Links
- Website: www.magia899.mx

XHRA-FM is a radio station in Guadalajara. Broadcasting on 89.9 MHz, XHRA-FM is owned by MegaRadio and is known as Magia Digital.

== History ==
Rafael J. Rubio González obtained the station's concession in 1972. The station, originally on 89.1 MHz, played a similar mix of music to XESP-AM 1070 as "Stereo Soul". In the 1980s and 1990s, XHRA was a rock station. In 1996, it was sold to Frecuencia Modulada de Occidente; the new ownership eventually made the change to the present format.
