= DWLY =

Radio station in Baguio, Philippines

Cool 97.5
- Baguio; Philippines
- Broadcast area: Benguet, La Union and surrounding areas
- Frequency: 97.5 MHz
- Branding: Cool 97.5

Programming
- Languages: English, Filipino
- Format: Christian radio

Ownership
- Owner: UBC Media

History
- First air date: June 12, 1981 (as DWLY); January 1, 1997 (as Cool 97.5)
- Call sign meaning: Lord Yeshua

Technical information
- Licensing authority: NTC
- Power: 5 Kw

Links
- Website: cool975.weebly.com

Cool 97.5 (DWLY 97.5 MHz) is an FM station owned and operated by UBC Media (Love Radio Network). Its studios and transmitter are located at #43, 1st Rd., Brgy. Quezon Hill Proper, Baguio.

Established in 1981, it was formerly owned Central Development Communications and carried the tagline Your Love Radio until 1997, when UBC Media acquired the station.
