= KUBR =

Radio station in San Juan, Texas

Coordinates: 26°14′41″N 98°05′25″W

- San Juan, Texas; United States
- Broadcast area: Rio Grande Valley
- Frequency: 1210 kHz
- Branding: Radio Cristiana

Programming
- Format: Spanish Christian

Ownership
- Owner: Paulino Bernal

History
- First air date: 1985

Technical information
- Licensing authority: FCC
- Class: B
- Power: 10,000 watts day 5,000 watts night

Links
- Public license information: Public file; LMS

KUBR (1210 AM, "Radio Cristiana") is a Spanish language Christian radio station that serves the Rio Grande Valley border area. The station broadcasts from San Juan, Texas, United States.

== History ==
The Chapman Broadcasting Company obtained the construction permit for KUBR in 1985 and sold it to Bernal in 1988.
