= XETIA-FM =

Radio station in Guadalajara, Jalisco

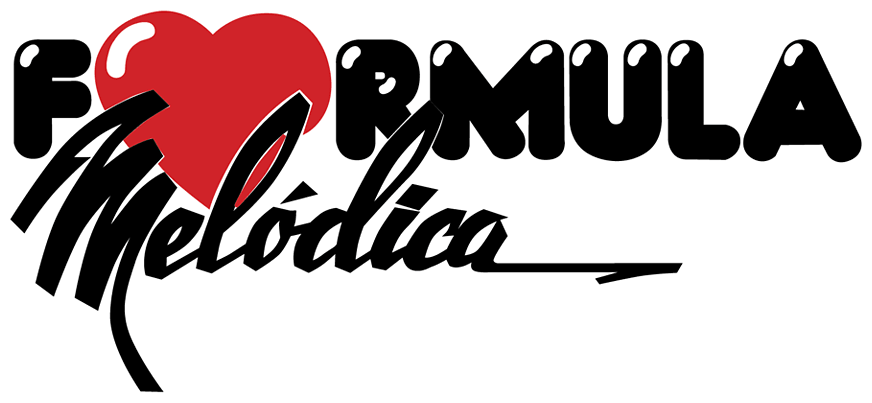

Guadalajara; Mexico
- Frequency: 97.9 MHz
- Branding: Fórmula Melódica

Programming
- Format: Romantic

Ownership
- Owner: Unidifusión; (XETIA-FM, S.A. de C.V.)
- Sister stations: XETIA-AM, XEAD-FM, XHOY-FM, XEAD-AM

History
- First air date: June 24, 1968 (concession)
- Call sign meaning: TapaTIA

Technical information
- ERP: 98.2 kW

Links
- Webcast: XETIA-FM

XETIA-FM is a radio station on 97.9 FM in Guadalajara. The station is owned by Unidifusión and is known as Fórmula Melódica with a romantic format.

== History ==
XETIA-FM received its first concession on June 24, 1968. It was owned by Radio Sinfonia, S.A., along with XETIA-AM 1310 (which remains co-owned). Originally assigned 97.3 MHz, as station spacing needed to be changed, it moved to 97.9 in the 1970s.

The current concessionaire took control in 2000.

== Booster ==
XETIA operates one booster, located on Cerro Chico in Ajijic, Jalisco, at 20°17′54″N 103°13′26″W. This repeater operates with 81 watts ERP.
