= XHBON-FM =

Radio Fórmula station in Guadalajara

- Guadalajara, Jalisco; Mexico
- Frequency: 89.5 MHz (HD Radio)
- Branding: Radio Fórmula

Programming
- Format: News/talk

Ownership
- Owner: Grupo Fórmula; (Transmisora Regional Radio Fórmula, S.A. de C.V.)
- Sister stations: XEGAJ-AM, XEDKN-AM

History
- First air date: June 23, 1950 (concession); April 9, 2018 (FM)
- Former call signs: XEGJ-AM, XEQP-AM, XEBON-AM
- Former frequencies: 1280 kHz (1950–2020)

Technical information
- Licensing authority: CRT
- Class: A
- ERP: 3 kW
- HAAT: 46.5 m (153 ft)
- Transmitter coordinates: 20°40′36.3″N 103°21′15.8″W

Links
- Website: radioformulaguadalajara.com

XHBON-FM is a radio station on 89.5 FM in Guadalajara, Jalisco, Mexico. It is owned by Radio Fórmula and carries its news and talk programming.

== History ==
XEGJ-AM received its concession on June 23, 1950. It was owned by Radio Tiempo de Occidente, S.A. and became XEQP-AM on November 21, 1964. It was known for several decades as Radio Variedades.

In 1975, XEQP was bought by Organización Independiente de Radio. OIR sold XEQP to Organización PRAM, S.A. de C.V. in 1992. PRAM changed the callsign to XEBON-AM on December 10, 1996. During most of this time, XEBON carried a regional Mexican format known as Radio Morena. Unidifusión acquired XEBON in 1998, and Radio Fórmula picked up the station in 2000.

Logo when on 1280

On April 9, 2018, XEBON-AM conducted its second-wave migration to FM as XHBON-FM 89.5. The station broadcasts in HD Radio and offers four total subchannels, including feeds of XEGAJ-AM and XEDKN-AM and the Trión musical format.
