= XEAD-AM =

Radio station in Guadalajara, Jalisco

- Tonalá, Jalisco; Mexico
- Broadcast area: Guadalajara, Jalisco
- Frequency: 1150 kHz
- Branding: Radio Metrópoli

Programming
- Format: News/talk

Ownership
- Owner: Grupo Unidifusión; (XEAD-AM, S.A. de C.V.)
- Sister stations: XETIA-AM, XETIA-FM, XHOY-FM, XEAD-FM

History
- First air date: 1936
- Call sign meaning: Alejandro Díaz, original concessionaire

Technical information
- Licensing authority: CRT
- Class: B
- Power: 50 kW day 1 kW night

Links
- Website: www.notisistema.com

XEAD-AM is a radio station on 1150 kHz in Guadalajara, Jalisco. It is known as Radio Metrópoli and carries a news/talk format.

== History ==
Alejandro Díaz obtained the original XEAD concession and began operations from Aguascalientes in 1936. The station moved to Guadalajara in 1939.

By 1953, the station was known as Radio Centro de Jalisco, competing mainly against XEAV "Canal 58". In 1964, XEAD-FM came to life on 101.9 FM; it remains co-owned with XEAD-AM.

In the early 1970s, the Inforjal (Información Jalisco) news service was created, serving much of western Mexico and the Bajío region. It became known as Notisistema in 1980, the same year Radio Metrópoli was born.
