= WHMV-LP =

Coordinates: 43°00′48″N 74°59′47″W

- Mohawk, New York; United States
- Broadcast area: Utica, New York
- Frequency: 97.5 MHz
- Branding: V 97.5 FM

Programming
- Format: Adult contemporary

Ownership
- Owner: Mohawk Valley Radio Group, Inc.

History
- First air date: November 9, 2016
- Call sign meaning: "Herkimer County, Mohawk Valley"

Technical information
- Licensing authority: FCC
- Facility ID: 193035
- Class: L1
- Power: 236 watts
- ERP: 100 watts
- HAAT: -89.05 meters

Links
- Public license information: LMS
- Webcast: Listen Live
- Website: WHMV-LP's webpage

WHMV-LP (97.5 FM; "V 97.5 FM") is a community low power radio station broadcasting a variety format. Licensed to Mohawk, New York, the station primarily serves Southern Herkimer County in New York state, commonly referred to as "the Valley" by people in the nearby Utica-Rome area. The station is owned by the Mohawk Valley Radio Group, Inc., and operates from studios on West Main Street in Mohawk.

== Programming ==
WHMV-LP began broadcasting on November 9, 2016. The station plays a "variety" of music formats as the "V" in its branding indicates. The "V" may also stand for the Mohawk Valley, the area to which WHMV-LP broadcasts. In addition to its music programming, WHMV-LP is also planning additional community type programming, among them a program called Mohawk Valley Matters - featuring local guests and covering topics of local concern to Southern Herkimer County.
