= XEGAJ-AM =

Radio station in Guadalajara

- Guadalajara, Jalisco; Mexico
- Frequency: 790 kHz
- Branding: Radio Fórmula (Primera Cadena)

Programming
- Format: News/talk

Ownership
- Owner: Radio Fórmula; (Transmisora Regional Radio Fórmula, S.A. de C.V.)
- Sister stations: XEDKN-AM, XHBON-FM

History
- First air date: April 1, 1992 (concession)
- Call sign meaning: GuAdalajara Jalisco

Technical information
- Licensing authority: CRT
- Class: C
- Power: 250 watts
- Transmitter coordinates: 20°40′36.3″N 103°21′15.8″W

Links
- Website: https://radioformulaguadalajara.com/

XEGAJ-AM is a radio station on 790 AM in Guadalajara, Jalisco. It is owned by Radio Fórmula and carries its news/talk programming.

== History ==
XEGAJ received its concession on April 1, 1992. It was owned by Radio Color, S.A., a Radiorama subsidiary. It was sold to Radio Fórmula in 2000.
