= XHFCT-FM =

Radio station in Tomatlán, Jalisco, Mexico

Defunct

Tomatlán, Jalisco, Mexico; Mexico
- Frequency: 96.3 MHz

Ownership
- Owner: Comité Pro-Fomento de la Cultura de Tomatlán, A.C.

History
- First air date: 2000
- Last air date: May 22, 2019 (renewal denied)
- Call sign meaning: From the name of the permittee, Comité Pro-Fomento de la Cultura de Tomatlán, A.C.

Technical information
- ERP: 1 kW
- HAAT: -37.9 m
- Transmitter coordinates: 19°56′46.4″N 105°15′6.4″W

XHFCT-FM was a noncommercial radio station in Tomatlán, Jalisco, Mexico. It broadcast on 96.3 FM and was known as La Tropicosta.

== History ==
Logo as La Tropicosta, used from 2010 to 2019

The station received its permit in 2000, though its roots dated to a temporary radio station on 100.1 that operated for 18 months from August 22, 1995, to 1997. It was well-received, and an application was made for a fully permitted radio station.

On May 22, 2019, the Federal Telecommunications Institute voted to deny a renewal application for XHFCT-FM, as well as the associated transition of its permit to a social community concession. In processing XHFCT's renewal, it found that the noncommercial station had sold advertising time in violation of its permit.
