= WGRA =

- Cairo, Georgia; United States
- Frequency: 790 kHz
- Branding: News Talk 790 WGRA

Programming
- Format: talk radio
- Affiliations: Premiere Radio Networks, Talk Radio Network

Ownership
- Owner: Lovett Broadcasting Enterprises, Inc.

Technical information
- Facility ID: 38639
- Class: D
- Power: 1,000 watts day 110 watts night
- Transmitter coordinates: 30°54′0.00″N 84°14′0.00″W

Links
- Website: wgra.net

WGRA (790 AM) is a radio station broadcasting a talk radio format. Licensed to Cairo, Georgia, United States, the station is currently owned by Lovett Broadcasting Enterprises. In August 2020, the station can now also be heard on an FM translator at 95.9FM.
