= XHZK-FM =

Radio station in Tepatitlán de Morelos, Jalisco, Mexico

- Tepatitlán de Morelos, Jalisco; Mexico
- Frequency: 96.7 FM
- Branding: Poder 55

Programming
- Format: Pop

Ownership
- Owner: Sistema Radio Alteña; (Sucesión de José Ismael Alvarado Robles)
- Sister stations: XHQZ-FM

History
- First air date: November 6, 1960 (concession)

Technical information
- ERP: 3 kW
- HAAT: 54.72 meters
- Transmitter coordinates: 20°50′52″N 102°44′12″W

XHZK-FM is a radio station on 96.7 FM in Tepatitlán de Morelos, Jalisco. It is known as Poder 55.

== History ==
XEZK-AM 1600 received its concession on November 6, 1960. It was owned by José Ismael Alvarado Robles and known as Radio Alteña. The 250-watt station increased power to 1 kW day by the 1980s, and in the 1990s it moved to 550 kHz and increased power to 2.5 kW day and 1 kW night.

XEZK was authorized for AM-FM migration in 2011.
