= XECSAC-AM =

Radio station in El Arenal, Jalisco

- El Arenal, Jalisco; Mexico
- Frequency: 1210 AM
- Branding: Valles Digital Radio

Programming
- Format: Talk

Ownership
- Owner: José Trinidad Chavira Vargas

History
- First air date: 2019
- Call sign meaning: (templated callsign)

Technical information
- Licensing authority: CRT
- Class: B
- Power: 1.1 kW
- Transmitter coordinates: 20°46′58.77″N 103°42′17″W

Links
- Webcast: Valles Digital Radio
- Website: XECSAC on Facebook

XECSAC-AM is a noncommercial social radio station on 1210 AM in El Arenal, Jalisco. It is owned by José Trinidad Chavira Vargas and is known as Valles Digital Radio.

== History ==
On September 5, 2018, the Federal Telecommunications Institute awarded the 1210 frequency, for which two parties had filed in 2017, to Chavira Vargas. The station began broadcasting at the end of 2019.
