= KTJZ =

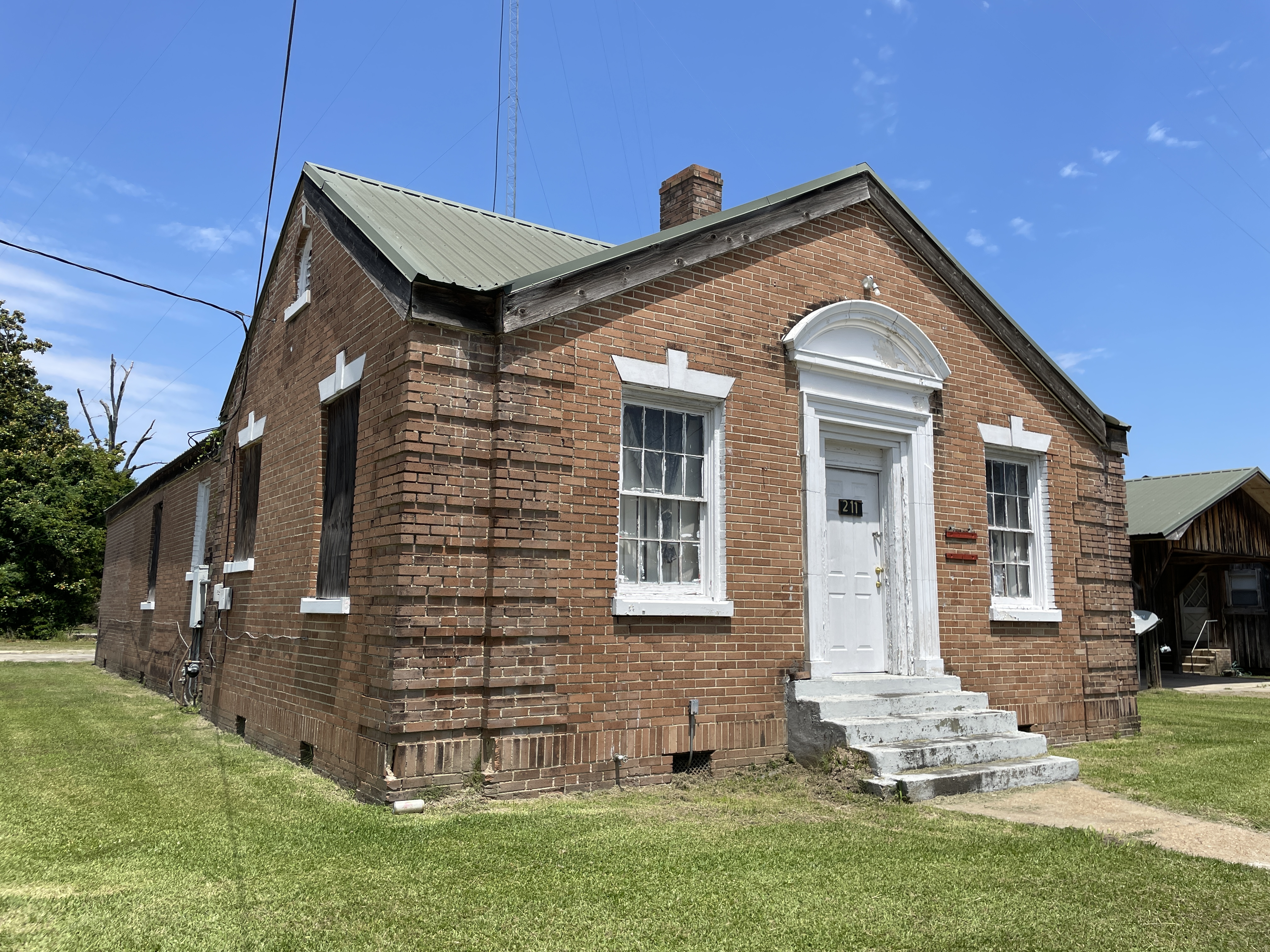
- Tallulah, Louisiana; United States
- Frequency: 97.5 MHz
- Branding: "Praise 97.5"

Programming
- Format: Urban gospel

Ownership
- Owner: Mid South Communications Company, Inc.

Technical information
- Licensing authority: FCC
- Facility ID: 164218
- Class: A
- ERP: 6,000 watts
- HAAT: 60 metres (200 ft)
- Transmitter coordinates: 32°24′40″N 91°11′37″W

Links
- Public license information: Public file; LMS
- Webcast: Listen Live
- Website: ktjz975.com

KTJZ (97.5 FM) is an American radio station licensed to serve the community of Tallulah, Louisiana. The station is owned by Mid South Communications Company, Inc., and airs an urban contemporary format.

The station was assigned the KTJZ call letters by the Federal Communications Commission on March 10, 2005.
