= XHXXX-FM =

Radio station in Tamazula de Gordiano, Jalisco, Mexico

XHXXX-AM, XEXXX-AM
- Tamazula de Gordiano, Jalisco; Mexico
- Frequencies: 97.5 FM; 840 kHz
- Branding: Fiesta Mexicana

Programming
- Format: Grupera

Ownership
- Owner: Radio Sistema del Sur, S.A. de C.V.

History
- First air date: February 13, 1967 (concession)

Technical information
- Licensing authority: CRT
- Class: B1 (FM); B (AM)
- Power: 5,000 watts
- ERP: 50 kW
- HAAT: 51.3 m (168 ft)
- Transmitter coordinates: 19°40′50″N 103°15′24″W

XHXXX-FM and XEXXX-AM is a radio station combo on 97.5 FM and in 840 AM in Tamazula de Gordiano, Jalisco, serving Ciudad Guzmán. It is known as Fiesta Mexicana and carries a grupera format.

== History ==
XEQJ-AM 1550 received its concession on February 13, 1967. Owned by María del Carmen Pelayo de Pérez, it was a 500-watt daytimer. The current concessionaire took control in 1972. It soon moved to 1560 kHz in order to increase power to 5 kW, and it moved again, to 840 kHz, in the 1990s.

It was bought by Promomedios Jalisco in 1985 and approved to migrate to FM in 2011.
