= XHESP-FM (Jalisco) =

Radio station in San Pedro Tlaquepaque, Jalisco, Mexico

- San Pedro Tlaquepaque, Jalisco; Mexico
- Broadcast area: Guadalajara metropolitan area
- Frequency: 91.9 MHz
- Branding: Rock & Soul

Programming
- Format: Rock & Soul

Ownership
- Owner: MegaRadio; (Radio Impulsora de Occidente, S.A. de C.V.)
- Sister stations: XHRA-FM, XHLS-FM

History
- First air date: January 8, 1947 (concession); April 16, 2018 (FM)
- Former call signs: XESP-AM
- Former frequencies: 1400 kHz (1947–1960); 1070 kHz (1960–2019)
- Call sign meaning: San Pedro Tlaquepaque

Technical information
- Licensing authority: CRT
- Class: A
- ERP: 3 kW
- HAAT: 45.3 meters (149 ft)
- Transmitter coordinates: (FM) 20°41′07.13″N 103°23′24.95″W

Links
- Website: rocksoul919.com

XHESP-FM is a radio station on 91.9 FM in San Pedro Tlaquepaque, Jalisco in the Guadalajara metropolitan area. It is owned by MegaRadio and carries a rock format known as Rock & Soul.

== History ==
1070 Noticias logo

XESP-AM received its concession on January 8, 1947. It was owned by Herminio Macías Alonso and broadcast initially on 1400 kHz with 250 watts. Víctor Manuel Chávez y Chávez bought XESP in 1954, only to sell it to Radio Impulsora de Occidente the next year. By the 1960s, it broadcast with 5,000 watts day and 1,000 watts night on 1070 kHz.

For decades until the mid-2000s, XESP was known as Radio Juventud. At that time, it adopted a news/talk format known as 1070 Noticias, Con la Información Que Más Te Interesa ("With the Information That's Relevant to You").

Upon second-wave AM-FM migration, on April 16, 2018, XESP-AM signed on XHESP-FM 91.9 and ditched its all-news format for a rock format known as "Rock & Soul", as well as new newscasts titled "Líder Informativo". The AM signed off December 10, 2019.

== HD Radio ==
In addition to an HD1 subchannel simulcasting its analog signal, XHESP-FM offered an HD2 subchannel known as Origen, simulcasting social station XEPBGR-AM 1510. This subchannel is not authorized by the Federal Telecommunications Institute. The HD signal has since been turned off.
