= XETIA-AM =

Radio station in Tonalá, Jalisco

- Tonalá, Jalisco; Mexico
- Frequency: 1310 kHz
- Branding: Radio Vital

Programming
- Format: Romantic

Ownership
- Owner: Unidifusión; (XETIA-AM, S.A. de C.V.)
- Sister stations: XETIA-FM, XEAD-FM, XHOY-FM, XEAD-AM

History
- First air date: March 9, 1945 (concession)
- Call sign meaning: TapaTIA

Technical information
- Licensing authority: CRT
- Class: B
- Power: 10,000 watts day/1,000 watts night
- Transmitter coordinates: 20°36′57.3″N 103°16′29.3″W

Links
- Website: www.notisistema.com/radiovital/

XETIA-AM is a radio station on 1310 AM in Tonalá, Jalisco. It is owned by Unidifusión and carries a romantic music format known as Radio Vital.

== History ==
XEJE-AM received its concession on March 9, 1945. It was owned by Guillermo Johnston and broadcast with 250 watts. XEJE became XETIA-AM by the 1960s and was sold twice, once to Radiodifusoras de Occidente in 1960, and again to Radio Sinfonía, S.A. in 1967. This latter owner succeeded in obtaining a sister FM station for XETIA, XETIA-FM. Power was raised from 1 to 5 kW in the 1980s and again to 10 kW by the 2000s.

In early 2019, XETIA-AM ditched its Radio Vital health talk format for Sabrosita, programmed by Mexico City-based NRM Comunicaciones and largely a simulcast of its XEPH-AM 590 AM.

On June 22, 2019, Sabrosita stopped broadcasting, with XETIA returning to Radio Vital.
