= KNFT (AM) =

- Logo before translator sign on
- Bayard, New Mexico; United States
- Frequency: 950 kHz
- Branding: Oldies 950AM 96.5FM

Programming
- Format: Oldies

Ownership
- Owner: SkyWest Media, LLC; (SkyWest Licenses New Mexico, LLC)

History
- First air date: 1968
- Call sign meaning: Nine-Fif-Ty (950 AM)

Technical information
- Licensing authority: FCC
- Facility ID: 28125
- Class: D
- Power: 5,000 watts day 224 watts night
- Transmitter coordinates: 32°46′51″N 108°11′58″W
- Translators: 93.7 K229DS (Silver City); 96.5 K243BH (Silver City)

Links
- Public license information: Public file; LMS
- Website: silvercityradio.com

KNFT (950 AM) is a radio station broadcasting an oldies format. Licensed to Bayard, New Mexico, United States, the station is currently owned by SkyWest Media, LLC, and the broadcast license is held by Skywest Licenses New Mexico, LLC.
