= XHOY-FM =

Radio station in Guadalajara, Jalisco, Mexico

- Guadalajara, Jalisco; Mexico
- Frequency: 90.7 MHz
- Branding: Señal 90

Programming
- Format: Oldies

Ownership
- Owner: Unidifusión; (Lomeli Radio, S.A. de C.V.)
- Sister stations: XETIA-AM, XETIA-FM, XEAD-FM, XEAD-AM

History
- First air date: November 17, 1978 (concession)

Technical information
- Licensing authority: CRT
- Class: B
- ERP: 49.97 kW
- HAAT: 61.9 meters (203 ft)
- Transmitter coordinates: 20°40′44.4″N 103°22′28.0″W

Links
- Webcast: Listen live
- Website: notisistema.com

XHOY-FM is a radio station on 90.7 FM in Guadalajara, Jalisco, Mexico. The station is owned by Unidifusión and known as Señal 90.

== History ==
XHOY received its first concession on November 17, 1978. It was owned by the successors of María Cruz de la Torre until being sold to Lomeli Radio in the 1990s.
