= WIXZ =

- Steubenville, Ohio; United States
- Broadcast area: Wheeling, West Virginia
- Frequency: 950 kHz
- Branding: WIXZ 950, We Play What They Don’t!

Programming
- Format: Soft oldies; adult standards

Ownership
- Owner: Robert William Scharnhorst and Kim Paris Scharnhorst

History
- First air date: May 20, 1974
- Former call signs: WLIT (1974–1987); WDIG (1987–2018)

Technical information
- Licensing authority: FCC
- Facility ID: 73769
- Class: D
- Power: 1,000 watts (day); 35 watts (night)
- Transmitter coordinates: 40°26′49.00″N 80°34′6.00″W

Links
- Public license information: Public file; LMS

WIXZ (950 AM) is a radio station broadcasting an Oldies music format. Licensed to Steubenville, Ohio, United States, it serves the Wheeling, West Virginia, area. The station is currently owned by Robert and Kim Scharnhorst. Current on-air personalities include Robert (using the on-air name Bob Christie) and Gary O.

WIXZ operates with a power output of 1,000 watts day, and 35 watts at night.

== History ==
=== Beginnings as WLIT ===
The roots of this station can be traced back to July 19, 1968, when the construction permit was first issued to Capitol Broadcasting Corporation, a company based in Charleston, West Virginia.

However, the station's beginnings were hampered by a lengthy set of competitive hearings prior to going on the air. The station finally signed on the air for the very first time as WLIT on May 20, 1974 from its studios at 2224 Sunset Boulevard in Steubenville, and was the last AM station to come on the air in the Steubenville market. The station first operated as a daytime-only operation with a maximum power output of 500 watts. Two years after its debut, WLIT was granted permission to double its authorized power to 1,000 watts.

In May 1977, Capitol Broadcasting Corporation sold WLIT to Contemporary Communications, Inc. Contemporary Communications later sold WLIT to Frederick J. Staffilino in June 1982.

Steubenville, like Pittsburgh and Wheeling, the larger cities surrounding it, fell economically due to the collapse of the steel industry in the early 1980s. The steel industry supported much of the retail industry, which radio depends upon for its survival. After the collapse, many local stations in the area were in a fight for survival. WLIT was no exception to this, and despite hard times, managed to forge ahead and struggle through the 1980s.

=== Change to WDIG ===
The station's call sign was changed to WDIG in January 1987 and the station adopted an oldies format, delivered via satellite through the "Pure Gold" 1960s and 1970s oldies format through the Satellite Music Network. The call letters were a play on words for "DIG", the popular youth slang term of the 1960s to reflect the new sound.

Financial troubles forced the station's ownership into bankruptcy in February 1989, pushing them to seek refinancing or a new buyer. In March 1989, an agreement was reached to transfer WDIG to Romano R. Cironi, Sr. The sale was consummated on June 9, 1989.

However, in the early-1990s, the station began to have much more serious problems, as two oldies-formatted FM stations began to dominate the landscape. WJPA in Washington, Pennsylvania, switched to oldies and embarked on an aggressive marketing campaign to attract new listeners. A new adult contemporary FM station, WWYS, had been launched in Cadiz, Ohio, at 106.3 back in 1990. It too switched to oldies and now with the FM competition, WDIG found itself fighting for its survival, but the fight proved futile, as the station fell briefly silent.

=== Rebirth ===
WDIG returned to the air with a new gospel music format after the station was purchased from Cironi by World Witness For Christ Ministries in November 1991. The station was managed by Pittsburgh radio programmer Del King. Some years later, the format was changed to urban adult contemporary, utilizing Westwood One’s The Touch satellite programming, with some Gospel and religious programming remaining, mainly on weekends.

Effective December 1, 2018, WDIG was purchased by Robert and Kim Scharnhorst from World Witness For Christ Ministries. Scharnhorst was a Pittsburgh radio personality and broadcast engineer known professionally as Bob Christie.

The new owners changed the station's call sign to WIXZ on December 4, 2018 and changed the format back to oldies. Bob Christie chose the call letters as they reflected his first radio station in McKeesport, Pennsylvania, which is today known as WGBN.

In 2026, the station’s playlist shifted toward adult standards, incorporating more easy listening, traditional pop, Motown, and other softer oldies, while reducing harder classic rock and 80’s music.

The religious program Voice of Victory, hosted by minister Earlene McShan of Steubenville’s Faith & Power Deliverance Church, has aired six days a week on WIXZ for many years, dating back to the WDIG days.
