= WHLJ-FM =

- Statenville, Georgia; United States
- Broadcast area: Valdosta area
- Frequency: 97.5 MHz
- Branding: "Foxy 97.5"

Programming
- Format: Urban Adult Contemporary
- Affiliations: ABC Radio

Ownership
- Owner: La Taurus Productions Inc.

History
- Former call signs: WHLJ (1997–2012)

Technical information
- Licensing authority: FCC
- Facility ID: 36659
- Class: A
- ERP: 4,200 watts
- HAAT: 119.7 meters
- Transmitter coordinates: 30°48′22.00″N 83°0′21.00″W

Links
- Public license information: Public file; LMS
- Website: http://www.foxy97.com/

WHLJ-FM (97.5 FM) is a radio station broadcasting an Urban Adult Contemporary format. Licensed to Statenville, Georgia, United States, the station serves the Valdosta area. The station is currently owned by La Taurus Productions Inc. and features programming from ABC Radio.
