= WDIF-LP =

Coordinates: 40°36′46″N 87°7′48″W

- Marion, Ohio; United States
- Broadcast area: Marion and surrounding communities of Marion County, Ohio
- Frequency: 97.5 MHz
- Branding: Tru Blues 97.5

Programming
- Format: All blues

Ownership
- Owner: Marion Makes Music, Inc.

History
- First air date: August 2003 (as WDCM-LP)
- Former call signs: WDCM-LP (2005–2013)
- Call sign meaning: Previously used at 94.3 FM

Technical information
- Licensing authority: FCC
- Facility ID: 132319
- Class: L1
- ERP: 75 watts

Links
- Public license information: LMS
- Webcast: Listen Live
- Website: TruBlues975.com

WDIF-LP is a non-commercial low-power FM broadcasting station in Marion, Ohio featuring an all-blues format.

It is the only Ohio radio station with a full-time blues format.

WDIF-LP is underwritten locally by local businesses and listener support.

In addition to the station's audiostream from its website and the TuneIn app, it also hosts a yearly barbeque and blues festival in downtown Marion during the month of September.
