= XHLS-FM =

Radio station in Guadalajara, Jalisco, Mexico

- Guadalajara, Jalisco; Mexico
- Frequency: 99.5 MHz
- Branding: Romance 99.5

Programming
- Format: Romantic

Ownership
- Owner: MegaRadio; (Impulsora de Frecuencia Modulada, S.A.)
- Sister stations: XHRA-FM, XHESP-FM

History
- First air date: December 13, 1973 (concession)
- Call sign meaning: Original concessionaire Luis Ignacio Santibañez Patiño

Technical information
- Licensing authority: CRT
- Class: B
- ERP: 28.39 kW
- HAAT: 72.12 meters (236.6 ft)
- Transmitter coordinates: 20°41′07.2″N 103°23′24.9″W

Links
- Webcast: www.romance995.com

XHLS-FM is a radio station on 99.5 FM in Guadalajara. The station is owned by MegaRadio and carries a romantic music format known as Romance 99.5.

== History ==
XHLS received its first concession on December 13, 1973. It was formerly known as Stereo Juventud, with a format of Easy Listening music, until 2005.
