= XEAD-FM =

Radio station in Guadalajara, Jalisco

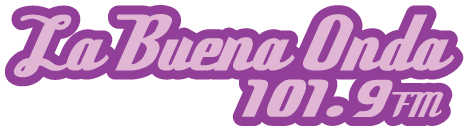

Guadalajara; Mexico
- Frequency: 101.9 MHz
- Branding: La Buena Onda

Programming
- Format: Pop

Ownership
- Owner: Grupo Unidifusión; (XEAD-FM, S.A. de C.V.)
- Sister stations: XETIA-AM, XHOY-FM, XEAD-AM, XETIA-FM

History
- First air date: October 11, 1967 (concession)
- Call sign meaning: From XEAD-AM

Technical information
- ERP: 98.2 kW

Links
- Website: La Buena Onda XEAD-FM website

XEAD-FM is a radio station on 101.9 FM in Guadalajara. The station is owned by Notisistema and is known as La Buena Onda.

== History ==
XEAD-FM received its first concession on October 11, 1967. It was owned by Radio Sinfonia, S.A., along with XEAD-AM 1150 (which remains co-owned). The current concessionaire took control in 2000.

== Booster ==
XEAD operates one booster, located on Cerro Chico in Ajijic, Jalisco, at 20°17′54″N 103°13′26″W. This repeater operates with 81 watts ERP.
