= KFTX =

Kingsville, Texas; United States
- Broadcast area: Corpus Christi
- Frequency: 97.5 MHz
- Branding: 97.5 Real Country

Programming
- Format: Country
- Affiliations: Westwood One

Ownership
- Owner: Quality Broadcasting Corporation

History
- First air date: May 1970
- Former call signs: KPUP (1970-1984); KINE-FM (1984–1984); KDUV (1984–1989); KWVS (1989-1995)
- Former frequencies: 97.7 (1970-1989)

Technical information
- Licensing authority: FCC
- Facility ID: 54036
- Class: C1
- ERP: 100,000 watts
- HAAT: 291.0 meters (954.7 ft)
- Transmitter coordinates: 27°44′28″N 97°36′8″W

Links
- Public license information: Public file; LMS
- Webcast: Listen live
- Website: Official website

KFTX (97.5 FM, "97.5 Real Country") is a radio station broadcasting a country music format. Licensed to Kingsville, Texas, United States, the station serves the Corpus Christi area. The station is currently owned by Quality Broadcasting Corporation and features programming from Westwood One. Its studios are located southwest of Corpus Christi and the transmitter is near Robstown, Texas.

== History ==
The station signed on as KPUP in May 1970 on 97.7 MHz and ran an MOR format most of the decade. The call letters were changed to KINE-FM on April 20, 1984. On November 5, 1984, the station changed its call sign to KDUV. After a run with an AC format, it changed to Top 40 in 1986 as "V97". KDUV changed to New Age KWVS in February 1989. The station also increased its power from 3kw to 100kw and moved to 97.5 MHz at that time, enabling it to target the Corpus Christi market. KWVS shifted to Adult Alternative in 1990 and eventually moved to a Classic Rock format. On May 1, 1995, the station switched to Country and its call letters were changed to the current KFTX.
