= KTRT =

- Winthrop, Washington; United States
- Broadcast area: N.Central Washington State, USA
- Frequency: 97.5 MHz
- Branding: The Root

Programming
- Format: Eclectic

Ownership
- Owner: KTRT Radio, Inc.

History
- Call sign meaning: KTRT "The Root"

Technical information
- Licensing authority: FCC
- Facility ID: 164605
- Class: C3
- ERP: 330 watts
- HAAT: 503.0 meters (1,650.3 ft)
- Transmitter coordinates: 48°19′6.00″N 120°6′47.00″W

Links
- Public license information: Public file; LMS
- Website: radioroot.com

KTRT (97.5 FM, "The Root") is a radio station licensed to Winthrop, Washington, United States.
