= DXLM =

Radio station in Misamis Occidental, Philippines

Radio One Ozamiz (DXLM)
Ozamiz; Philippines
- Broadcast area: Southern Misamis Occidental and surrounding areas
- Frequency: 97.5 MHz
- Branding: Radio One 97.5

Programming
- Languages: Filipino, Cebuano
- Format: Contemporary MOR, OPM
- Network: Radio One

Ownership
- Owner: M.I.T. Radio Television Network
- Sister stations: N93 Jimenez

History
- First air date: September 15, 1992

Technical information
- Licensing authority: NTC
- Power: 5 kW

Radio One 97.5 (DXLM 97.5 MHz) is an FM station owned and operated by M.I.T. Radio Television Network. Its studios and transmitter are located at Brgy. Bañadero, Ozamiz.
