= XHZAM-FM =

Radio station in Mazamitla, Jalisco, Mexico

Defunct
- Mazamitla, Jalisco; Mexico
- Frequency: 99.1 MHz
- Branding: Origen Radio

Ownership
- Owner: Grupo Radio Monte, A.C.
- Operator: Grupo Origen

History
- First air date: March 1, 2011
- Last air date: 2021 or 2022
- Call sign meaning: Mazamitla

Technical information
- Class: B1
- ERP: 1 kW
- HAAT: 351 m
- Transmitter coordinates: 19°54′54.3″N 103°00′35.3″W

XHZAM-FM was a noncommercial radio station on 99.1 FM in Mazamitla, Jalisco, Mexico, last known as Origen Radio.

== History ==
XHZAM signed on March 1, 2011, after receiving its permit. It was originally known as Total FM and then La Número Uno. Grupo Radio Monte is owned by Héctor Álvarez Contreras, a one-time deputy to the Jalisco state legislature. In 2018, the IFT authorized the station to relocate its transmitter and upgrade from a class A to B1 station.

In 2019, the station began broadcasting Origen Radio full-time as a rimshot into Guadalajara. Origen had briefly broadcast on 1510 XEPBGR-AM prior to moving to 99.1.

The Federal Telecommunications Institute denied a renewal of XHZAM-FM's concession on September 8, 2021, as filed too late. The filing needed to be made by September 1, 2019, but was not received until June 2, 2021. The concession expired March 1, 2022.
