= XEJB-FM =

Public radio station in Guadalajara, Jalisco

- Tlaquepaque, Jalisco; Mexico
- Broadcast area: Guadalajara
- Frequency: 96.3 MHz
- Branding: Jalisco Radio

Programming
- Format: Cultural

Ownership
- Owner: Gobierno del Estado de Jalisco

History
- First air date: February 1960

Technical information
- Licensing authority: CRT
- Class: B
- ERP: 29.72 kWs
- HAAT: 218.76 meters (717.7 ft)
- Transmitter coordinates: 20°36′00.5″N 103°21′56.7″W
- Repeater: XHCGJ-FM 107.1 Ciudad Guzmán

Links
- Website: web.archive.org/web/20150706013250/http://c7jalisco.com:80/radio

XEJB-FM (96.3 FM) is an FM radio station in Guadalajara, Jalisco, Mexico. Broadcasting from a transmitter located atop Cerro del Cuatro, XEJB-FM is owned by the government of Jalisco and carries a cultural radio format under the name Jalisco Radio.

XEJB-FM is simulcast in Ciudad Guzmán on XHCGJ-FM 107.1 (3.2 kWs ERP).

== History ==
XEJB-FM was Jalisco's first public FM radio station. It came on air in February 1960 as a simulcast of XEJB-AM 630, and like several other stations in the 1960s, it broadcast on an even-decimal FM frequency, 96.4 MHz. It later moved to 96.3.
