= KIDH-LP =

- Meridian, Idaho; United States
- Frequency: 97.5 MHz
- Branding: Higher Rock Radio

Programming
- Format: Religious teaching/Contemporary Christian music

Ownership
- Owner: Calvary Chapel Meridian, Inc.

Technical information
- Licensing authority: FCC
- Facility ID: 194468
- Class: LP1
- ERP: 100 watts
- HAAT: 29 metres (95 ft)
- Transmitter coordinates: 43°36′22.6″N 116°24′07.4″W

Links
- Public license information: LMS
- Webcast: Listen live

KIDH-LP (97.5 FM, "Higher Rock Radio") is a radio station licensed to serve the community of Meridian, Idaho. The station is owned by Calvary Chapel Meridian, Inc., and airs a mix of Christian religious teaching and contemporary Christian music.

The station was assigned the KIDH-LP call letters by the Federal Communications Commission on May 19, 2015.
