= XEPBGJ-AM =

Public radio station in Guadalajara, Jalisco

- Guadalajara, Jalisco; Mexico
- Frequency: 630 kHz
- Branding: Jalisco Radio

Programming
- Format: Cultural

Ownership
- Owner: Gobierno del Estado de Jalisco
- Sister stations: XEJB-FM

History
- First air date: May 17, 1941 (formal inauguration); 2017 (current public concession)
- Former call signs: XEJB-AM (1941–2017)
- Call sign meaning: PABF Guadalajara Jalisco

Technical information
- Licensing authority: CRT
- Class: B
- Power: Day: 10 kWs; Night: 500 W
- Transmitter coordinates: 20°42′01.08″N 103°23′27.46″W
- Repeater: XEPBPV-AM 1080 Puerto Vallarta (5 kW day)

Links
- Website: jaliscoradio.com

XEPBGJ-AM is an AM radio station in Guadalajara, Jalisco. Broadcasting on 630 kHz, XEPBGJ-AM is owned by the government of Jalisco and carries a cultural radio format under the name Jalisco Radio.

== History ==
XEPBGJ, known prior to 2017 as XEJB-AM, is among the oldest state-owned radio stations in Mexico. It came to air on May 17, 1941, along with a shortwave counterpart, XEJG. The next month, the stations were formally launched. XEJB originally broadcast on 1000 kHz with XEJG on 4820 kHz. The stations each carried a J for Jalisco in their calls and one initial of then-governor Silvano Barba González's last name. Reports, though, often mangled XEJG's calls as XEJC because Barba González grew to be unpopular when his term concluded in 1943.

In 1948, XEJB moved to 630 kilohertz; in the early 1950s, XEJG ceased operations. 1960 saw the start of Jalisco's first FM station, the state-owned XEJB-FM on 96.4 MHz (later moved to its modern 96.3), which simulcast the AM station.

In 1999, XEJLV-AM 1080, a daytime-only station in Puerto Vallarta, was permitted, extending the reach of the AM service.

In 2017, the failure to timely renew permits for its AM radio stations in Guadalajara and Vallarta prompted the Sistema Jalisciense de Radio y Televisión, the agency that runs C7, to apply for new radio concessions to continue providing AM radio service. The result was that XEJB-AM became XEPBGJ-AM and its Puerto Vallarta relay became XEPBPV-AM, following a templated callsign pattern used since 2016 for some new radio stations. The station never returned to air because the tower necessary for its operation exceeded height limits for obstructions near the Puerto Vallarta airport, and the concession was surrendered on April 25, 2022.
