= XHUDG-FM =

Radio station and network of the Universidad de Guadalajara

- Guadalajara; Mexico
- Broadcast area: State of Jalisco
- Frequency: 104.3 MHz
- Branding: Radio Universidad

Programming
- Format: Public radio

Ownership
- Owner: Universidad de Guadalajara

History
- First air date: May 30, 1974
- Former call signs: XHUG-FM (1974–2013)
- Call sign meaning: Universidad de Guadalajara

Technical information
- Licensing authority: CRT
- Class: C1
- ERP: 100 kW
- HAAT: 332.5 m (1,091 ft)
- Transmitter coordinates: 20°36′01″N 103°21′50.65″W

Links
- Webcast: XHUDG-FM
- Website: http://udgtv.com/

XHUDG-FM is a radio station in Guadalajara, owned by the Universidad de Guadalajara. The station was founded in 1974 and is branded as Radio Universidad, the keystone of an eight-station radio network and sister to XHUDG-TDT channel 44.

== Transmitters ==
UDG owns eight transmitters throughout the state of Jalisco:

- XHUDG-FM 104.3 Guadalajara
- XHUGA-FM 105.5 Ameca
- XHANU-FM 102.3 Autlán de Navarro, 38.76 kW ERP
- XHGZ-FM 94.3 Zapotlán el Grande, 5 kW ERP
- XHUGC-FM 104.7 Colotlán
- XHUGL-FM 104.7 Lagos de Moreno, 1.727 kW ERP
- XHUGO-FM 107.9 Ocotlán
- XHUGPV-FM 104.3 Puerto Vallarta, 20 kW ERP

The transmitters have significant local production; XHUGL originates some programming for the network, and all carry additional locally focused news programming. Most, but not all, transmitters run around 2 kW of effective radiated power.

== History ==
XHUDG-FM began to transmit officially on May 30, 1974, created to bridge the gap between the academic community and the residents of Jalisco. However, the history of the station dates to an experimental transmission mounted in 1963 under the callsign XEIITG by UDG's engineering school. From the late 1960s, attempts were made to win a permit and actually launch a full-time radio station, a permit conceded by presidential decree in 1973. The first transmitter, donated by then-President Luis Echeverria, was put into place, and the station came on air from the engineering school, broadcasting 13 hours a day. XHUDG-FM moved to the Cultural and Administrative Building in 1983.

The transmitters in the rest of the state were all built in the early 2010s. At the same time, a permit discontinuity prompted the UDG to receive a new permit for its Guadalajara flagship, which became XHUDG-FM.

On the 2nd of October, 2023 XHUDG-FM raised its power to 100kW with a new transmitter to reduce “dead zones” and those areas where the signal was normally weak or non-existent, due to geographical obstacles or construction.

== Programming ==
Programming on XHUDG-FM and its transmitter network is widely varied. Music takes up most of the stations' broadcast day, and on the retransmitters, much of it is locally produced. News programming, known as Señal Informativa, primarily comes from Guadalajara with each transmitter producing its own additional local broadcasts. Señal Informativa was extended to TV with the launch of XHUDG television in 2011.
