= WVRV =

- Pine Level, Alabama; United States
- Broadcast area: Montgomery, Alabama
- Frequency: 97.5 MHz
- Branding: The New 101.5, 97.5 The River

Programming
- Format: Contemporary Christian

Ownership
- Owner: Stroh Communications Corp.; (Back Door Broadcasting LLC)
- Sister stations: WTKX

History
- First air date: 2008

Technical information
- Licensing authority: FCC
- Facility ID: 170945
- Class: A
- ERP: 6,000 watts
- HAAT: 100 meters (328 feet)
- Transmitter coordinates: 31°58′32″N 85°58′27″W

Links
- Public license information: Public file; LMS
- Webcast: Listen Live
- Website: wvrvfmtheriver.com

WVRV (97.5 FM, "The New 101.5, 97.5 The River") is a radio station that serves Pine Level, Alabama. The station is owned by Stroh Communications Corp. and the broadcast license is held by Back Door Broadcasting LLC. The station broadcasts a Contemporary Christian music format. It is also re-broadcast on 101.5 FM via a translator located in Montgomery, Alabama.

== History ==
The station's original construction permit was issued by the Federal Communications Commission on June 14, 2007. The station was assigned the WVRV call letters by the FCC on February 22, 2008. WVRV received its license to cover from the FCC on February 24, 2009.

== Ownership ==
In October 2008, Stroh Communications Corp., applied to transfer the construction permit and broadcast license for WVRV to Back Door Broadcasting LLC as part of a corporate reorganization. The deal was approved by the FCC on November 7, 2008, and the transaction was consummated on December 1, 2008. Back Door Broadcasting LLC is a wholly owned subsidiary of Stroh Communications Corp., which is in turn owned by Allan G. Stroh and Brenda Stroh, a married couple.
