= XHBIO-FM =

Radio station in Guadalajara, Jalisco, Mexico

- Guadalajara, Jalisco; Mexico
- Frequency: 92.3 FM
- Branding: Fiesta Mexicana

Programming
- Format: Regional Mexican

Ownership
- Owner: Grupo Promomedios; (Radio Sistema de Occidente, S.A. de C.V.)

History
- First air date: June 18, 1973 (concession)
- Call sign meaning: BIO (station was known as Estéreo Vida)

Technical information
- Licensing authority: CRT
- Class: B
- ERP: 50 kW
- HAAT: 35.2 meters (115 ft)
- Transmitter coordinates: 20°39′4.98″N 103°23′49.61″W

Links
- Webcast: Listen live
- Website: fiestamexicanafm.com

XHBIO-FM is a radio station on 92.3 FM in Guadalajara, Jalisco. The station is owned by Grupo Promomedios and carries a Regional Mexican format known as Fiesta Mexicana.

== History ==
XHBIO received its first concession on June 18, 1973. It was originally designated as XHCD-FM and owned by José de Jesús Cortés y Barbosa. The callsign was later changed in 1979.
