= 105.9 FM =

FM radio frequency

The following radio stations broadcast on FM frequency 105.9 MHz:

== Argentina ==
- Activa in Córdoba
- Atlantic in Selva, Santiago del Estero
- Ibiza in Santa Fe
- LRS354 Cadena Regional in Alcorta, Santa Fe
- Parque Vida in Buenos Aires
- Radio María in Sarmiento, Chubut
- Santafesina in Villa Gobernador Gálvez, Santa Fe
- Zonica in Buenos Aires

== Australia ==
- ABC Classic in Wagga Wagga, New South Wales
- ABC Classic in Melbourne, Victoria
- Radio National in Strahan, Tasmania
- Radio National in Mildura, Victoria
- 2GZF in Orange, New South Wales

== Canada (Channel 290) ==
- CBAF-FM-17 in St. John's, Newfoundland and Labrador
- CBKA-FM in La Ronge, Saskatchewan
- CBKW-FM in Pelican Narrows, Saskatchewan
- CFEP-FM in Eastern Passage, Nova Scotia
- CFMA-FM in Cache Creek, British Columbia
- CFMS-FM in Markham, Ontario
- CHPD-FM in Aylmer, Ontario
- CICX-FM in Orillia, Ontario
- CIFM-FM-5 in Barriere, British Columbia
- CIHO-FM-1 in La Malbaie, Quebec
- CITA-FM in Moncton, New Brunswick
- CJRY-FM in Edmonton, Alberta
- VF2379 in Missinipe, Saskatchewan
- VF2470 in New Hazelton, British Columbia
- VF2477 in Trois-Rivieres, Quebec
- VF2501 in Regina, Saskatchewan
- VF2505 in Fort St. James, British Columbia
- VF2540 in Castlegar, British Columbia

== China ==
- CNR Business Radio in Changsha and Hengyang
- Gaoyao Radio in Gaoyao, Zhaoqing

== Indonesia ==
- Ardan Radio in Bandung, West Java
- EBS FM in Surabaya, East Java
- Prambors in Banjarmasin, South Kalimantan

== Malaysia ==
- Lite in Kuala Terengganu, Terengganu

== Mexico ==
- XHBX-FM in Sabinas, Coahuila
- XHCOM-FM in Santa Isabel Cholula, Puebla
- XHCOV-FM in Poza Rica, Veracruz
- XHCUN-FM in Cancún, Quintana Roo
- XHFCY-FM in Kanasin (Mérida), Yucatán
- XHGAI-FM in Puerto Vallarta, Jalisco
- XHGU-FM in Ciudad Juárez, Chihuahua
- XHHER-FM in Hermosillo, Sonora
- XHLE-FM in Medellín, Veracruz
- XHLM-FM in Tuxtla Gutiérrez, Chiapas
- XHMIG-FM in San Miguel de Allende, Guanajuato
- XHNA-FM in Matamoros, Tamaulipas
- XHNES-FM in Nogales, Sonora
- XHPES-FM in Puerto Escondido, Oaxaca
- XHQJ-FM in Guadalajara, Jalisco
- XHQN-FM in Torreón, Coahuila
- XHSCAM-FM in Ziracuaretiro, Michoacán

<--*XHSCJZ-FM in Metztitlán, Hidalgo-->

- XHSU-FM in Mexicali, Baja California

== Philippines ==
- DWLA-FM in Metro Manila
- DYBT in Cebu City
- DXMX in Davao City
- DZCA-FM in Legazpi City
- DYWT in Iloilo City
- DXWW-FM in Zamboanga City

== United Kingdom ==
- Academy FM (Folkestone) in Folkestone, Kent
- Greatest Hits Radio Liverpool & The North West in Liverpool, Merseyside
- Heart South Wales in Aberdare and Newport
- Sunshine Radio in Ludlow, Shropshire

== United States (Channel 290) ==
- KAAQ in Alliance, Nebraska
- KAHL-FM in Hondo, Texas
- KALC in Denver, Colorado
- KBZE in Berwick, Louisiana
- KCCQ-LP in Crescent City, California
- KCIX in Garden City, Idaho
- KCNL in Quartzsite, Arizona
- KCZN-LP in McAllen, Texas
- KDFJ-LP in Fairbanks, Alaska
- KDKQ-LP in Derby, Kansas
- KEME-LP in Boulder, Montana
- KFBW in Vancouver, Washington
- KFMK in Round Rock, Texas
- KFXZ-FM in Opelousas, Louisiana
- KGBX-FM in Nixa, Missouri
- KHOT-FM in Paradise Valley, Arizona
- KIBQ in Austwell, Texas
- KICP in Patterson, Iowa
- KIRC in Seminole, Oklahoma
- KKBO in Flasher, North Dakota
- KKCD in Omaha, Nebraska
- KKSW in Lawrence, Kansas
- KKWS in Wadena, Minnesota
- KLAZ in Hot Springs, Arkansas
- KLJN in Coos Bay, Oregon
- KMIT (FM) in Mitchell, South Dakota
- KMJ-FM in Fresno, California
- KNRS-FM in Centerville, Utah
- KOLH-LP in Hermiston, Oregon
- KORC-LP in Corvallis, Oregon
- KPOI-FM in Honolulu, Hawaii
- KPWR in Los Angeles, California
- KQIK-FM in Haileyville, Oklahoma
- KQKY in Kearney, Nebraska
- KQPM in Ukiah, California
- KQTZ in Hobart, Oklahoma
- KRAZ in Santa Ynez, California
- KRJT in Elgin, Oregon
- KROZ-LP in Hobbs, New Mexico
- KRRW in Winthrop, Minnesota
- KRYC-LP in Yuba City, California
- KRZQ in Amargosa Valley, Nevada
- KRZY-FM in Santa Fe, New Mexico
- KSEL-FM in Portales, New Mexico
- KSSA in Ingalls, Kansas
- KTLB in Twin Lakes, Iowa
- KUKA (FM) in Driscoll, Texas
- KULH in Wheeling, Missouri
- KUZN in Centerville, Texas
- KWLG-LP in Montana City, Montana
- KWMY in Joliet, Montana
- KWNG in Red Wing, Minnesota
- KXQT in Stanton, Texas
- KYJK in Missoula, Montana
- KZZK in New London, Missouri
- WAYK in Valley Station, Kentucky
- WBCI in Bath, Maine
- WBGG-FM in Fort Lauderdale, Florida
- WBOF-LP in Fort Pierce, Florida
- WBZR-FM in Atmore, Alabama
- WCBV-LP in Lima, Ohio
- WCFS-FM in Elmwood Park, Illinois
- WCGS in Little Valley, New York
- WCSQ-LP in Cobleskill, New York
- WDMK in Detroit, Michigan
- WEGZ in Washburn, Wisconsin
- WEZV in North Myrtle Beach, South Carolina
- WFAL in Milner, Georgia
- WGKC in Mahomet, Illinois
- WGKX in Memphis, Tennessee
- WHCN in Hartford, Connecticut
- WILN in Panama City, Florida
- WJOT-FM in Wabash, Indiana
- WKHQ-FM in Charlevoix, Michigan
- WKLS in Southside, Alabama
- WKLZ in Syracuse, New York
- WKPO in Soldiers Grove, Wisconsin
- WLDC-LP in Goshen, Indiana
- WLNI in Lynchburg, Virginia
- WMAL-FM in Woodbridge, Virginia
- WMEX-LP in Rochester, New Hampshire
- WMMC in Marshall, Illinois
- WNJK in Burgin, Kentucky
- WNKN in Middletown, Ohio
- WNRQ in Nashville, Tennessee
- WOCL in DeLand, Florida
- WOKZ (FM) in Fairfield, Illinois
- WOMM-LP in Burlington, Vermont
- WPFS-LP in Monmouth, Illinois
- WPYR-LP in Baton Rouge, Louisiana
- WPZX in Pocono Pines, Pennsylvania
- WQWK in Philipsburg, Pennsylvania
- WQXR-FM in Newark, New Jersey
- WRHB-LP in Mifflinville, Pennsylvania
- WRKS in Pickens, Mississippi
- WRTR in Brookwood, Alabama
- WSNP-LP in Stevens Point, Wisconsin
- WTMT in Weaverville, North Carolina
- WTNJ in Mount Hope, West Virginia
- WTZB in Englewood, Florida
- WURE-LP in Troy, North Carolina
- WVAO-LP in Athol, Massachusetts
- WVGA (FM) in Lakeland, Georgia
- WWHG in Evansville, Wisconsin
- WWJM in New Lexington, Ohio
- WXDE in Lewes, Delaware
- WXDX-FM in Pittsburgh, Pennsylvania
- WXHQ-LP in Newport, Rhode Island
- WXLE in Indian Lake, New York
- WXMK in Dock Junction, Georgia
- WXXI-FM in Rochester, New York
- WXYK in Pascagoula, Mississippi
- WZED-LP in Newport, North Carolina
