= XHMIG-FM =

Imagen Radio station in San Miguel de Allende, Guanajuato

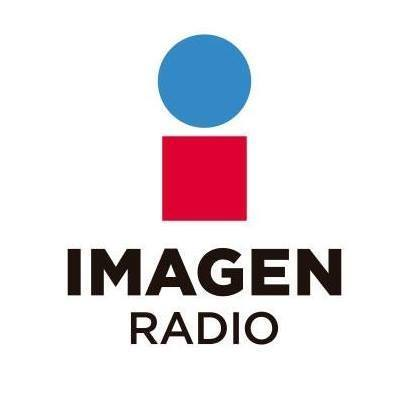
- San Miguel de Allende, Guanajuato; Mexico
- Frequency: 105.9 MHz
- Branding: Imagen Radio

Programming
- Format: News/talk

Ownership
- Owner: Grupo Imagen; (GIM Televisión Nacional, S.A. de C.V.)

History
- First air date: July 27, 1994 (concession)
- Call sign meaning: San Miguel de Allende

Technical information
- Class: C1
- ERP: 50,000 watts
- HAAT: 171.7 m
- Transmitter coordinates: 20°49′30.7″N 100°46′59.8″W

Links
- Website: www.imagenbajio.mx

XHMIG-FM is a radio station on 105.9 FM in San Miguel de Allende, Guanajuato, Mexico. XHMIG carries the news/talk programming of Imagen Radio.

== History ==
XHMIG received its concession on July 27, 1994. It was known as Fantasía 106 and owned by Emilio Nassar Rodríguez, who also owned XHEN-FM in Torreón and XHOZ-FM and XHOE-FM in Querétaro. The four-station group was known as Multimundo. In 1999, the station changed its name to Stereo 106; it then remained in the pop format by adopting the Exa FM pop franchise from MVS Radio in 2003.

In 2007, most of Multimundo, except for XHOE, was sold to Imagen. The station broadcast Imagen's news/talk programming during the day and pop and rock music from RMX at night. The latter was abandoned in 2011.
