= XHSU-FM (Mexicali) =

Radio station in Mexicali, Baja California

- Mexicali, Baja California; Mexico
- Frequencies: 105.9 MHz; 790 kHz
- Branding: La Dinámica

Programming
- Format: Grupera

Ownership
- Owner: Grupo Radiorama; (XESU, S.A.)
- Sister stations: KSEH, XECL-AM

History
- First air date: August 31, 1957; 1994(FM)

Technical information
- Licensing authority: CRT
- Class: A (FM); C (AM)
- Power: .75 kW day.025 kW night (AM)
- ERP: 3,000 watts (FM)
- HAAT: 50.33 m (165.1 ft) (FM)

Links
- Website: dinamica.radioramamexicali.com

XHSU-FM/XESU-AM is a combo radio station in Mexicali, Baja California. Broadcasting on 105.9 FM and 790 AM, XHSU/XESU is owned by Radiorama and is known as La Dinámica.

== History ==
XESU received its concession on August 31, 1957, originally owned by Ignacio Cárdenas Galvez. In the 1960s, it was sold to Luis Blando López.

The FM station was among the first wave of 80 AM-FM combos authorized, in 1994.
