= Q106 =

Q106 may refer to:

- WWQM-FM in Middleton, Wisconsin
- WJXQ in Charlotte, Michigan
- WHDQ in Claremont, New Hampshire
- KQXL-FM in Baton Rouge, Louisiana
- WQCB in Brewer, Maine
- KCQQ in Davenport, Iowa
- KLNV in San Diego, California, formerly known as "Q106"
- KOOC in Temple, Texas, formerly known as "Q106"
- KOQL in Ashland, Missouri
- KQPM in Ukiah, California
- KRZY-FM in Albuquerque, New Mexico, formerly known as "Q106"
- WQBZ in Macon, Georgia, formerly known as “Q106”, now known as “Q106.3”
- WQRL in Marion, Illinois
- WQTL in Tallahassee, Florida
- WQXA-FM in York, Pennsylvania, formerly known as "Q106"
- KQDI-FM in Great Falls, Montana
- Six FM in Northern Ireland
- Q106-FM in Toronto Canada
- Quran 106, the 106th chapter of the Quran
