= XHQN-FM =

Radio station in Torreón, Coahuila

XHQN-FM / XEQN-AM
- Torreón, Coahuila; Mexico
- Broadcast area: Comarca Lagunera
- Frequency: 105.9 FM / 740 AM
- Branding: Radio Fórmula

Programming
- Format: News/talk

Ownership
- Owner: Grupo Fórmula; (Transmisora Regional Radio Fórmula, S.A. de C.V.)

History
- First air date: 1988 (concession); 2011 (FM)

Technical information
- Licensing authority: CRT
- Class: B1 (FM); B (AM)
- Power: 10,000 watts
- ERP: 25 kW
- HAAT: 52.95 m (173.7 ft)
- Transmitter coordinates: 25°29′11″N 103°21′27″W

Links
- Webcast: Listen live
- Website: radioformula.com.mx

XHQN-FM/XEQN-AM is a radio station on 105.9 FM and 740 AM in Torreón, Coahuila, Mexico. The station is owned by Grupo Fórmula and carries its Radio Fórmula news/talk format.

== History ==
XEQN-AM received its concession in 1988 and was owned by the Nassar family, which also owned XHEN-FM 100.3. In 1997–98, both stations were transferred to Multimundo de Torreón.

In 2000, Multimundo sold XEQN to Radio Fórmula, years before the rest of the company's stations were sold to Grupo Imagen. In 2011, it moved to FM.
