= 990 AM =

AM radio frequency

The following radio stations broadcast on AM frequency 990 kHz: 990 AM is a Canadian clear-channel frequency. CBW Winnipeg and CBY Corner Brook, Newfoundland and Labrador, share Class A status on 990 kHz.

Because 990 kHz is a multiple of both 9 and 10, the frequency is available for use by broadcast stations in all three ITU regions.

== Argentina ==
- LR4 Splendid in Buenos Aires
- LRH203 in Formosa
- LRJ201 in Barreal (San Juan)

== Australia ==
- 4RO in Rockhampton, Queensland

== Canada ==
Stations in bold are clear-channel stations.

Call sign	City of license	Daytime power (kW)	Nighttime power (kW)	Transmitter coordinates
CBDB	Watson Lake, Yukon	0.4	0.165	60.0661°N 128.723°W
CBKN	Shalalth, British Columbia	0.04	0.04	50.730278°N 122.241667°W
CBQF	Carmacks, Yukon	0.04	0.04	62.1003°N 136.266°W
CBQJ	Ross River, Yukon	0.04	0.04	61.9417°N 132.448°W
**CBW**	Winnipeg, Manitoba	50	46	49.836111°N 97.512778°W
**CBY**	Corner Brook, Newfoundland and Labrador	10	10	48.9328°N 57.9061°W

== China ==
- BEB64 in Shanghai

== Mexico ==
- XECL-AM in Mexicali, Baja California
- XECSAM-AM in Teziutlan, Puebla
- XEHZ-AM in La Paz, Baja California Sur
- XET-AM in Monterrey, Nuevo León
- XETG-AM in Tuxtla Gutiérrez, Chiapas

== Philippines ==
- DZIQ in Makati (now defunct)
- DYTH-AM in Tacloban

== Singapore ==
- Capital 95.8FM (former AM frequency)

== United Kingdom ==
- BBC Radio 5 Live in Cardigan Bay, Wales

== United States ==
Call sign	City of license	Facility ID	Class	Daytime power (kW)	Nighttime power (kW)	Critical hours power (kW)	Unlimited power (kW)	Transmitter coordinates
KAML	Kenedy-Karnes City, Texas	17322	D	0.25	0.07			28.850556°N 97.88°W
KATD	Pittsburg, California	52256	B	10	5			38.504722°N 121.18°W
KAYL	Storm Lake, Iowa	49744	D	0.25	0.006			42.634722°N 95.169444°W
KFCD	Farmersville, Texas	43757	B	7	0.92			33.116944°N 96.279722°W
KIKI	Honolulu, Hawaii	40143	B	5.7	5.7			21.323889°N 157.875556°W
KRKS	Denver, Colorado	58632	B	6.5	0.39	4.2		39.799167°N 104.97°W
KRMO	Cassville, Missouri	43473	D	2.5	0.047			36.9375°N 93.925°W
KRSL	Russell, Kansas	71548	D	0.25	0.03			38.906111°N 98.860833°W
KSVP	Artesia, New Mexico	52065	B	1	0.25			32.824722°N 104.399722°W
KTHH	Albany, Oregon	39485	D	0.25	0.009			44.595278°N 123.126111°W
KTKT	Tucson, Arizona	2744	B	10	0.49			32.255278°N 111.008889°W
KTMS	Santa Barbara, California	14529	B	5	0.5			34.470833°N 119.675833°W
KWAM	Memphis, Tennessee	35873	B	10	0.45			35.134444°N 90.093889°W
KZZB	Beaumont, Texas	40485	B				1	30.149167°N 94.133056°W
WABO	Waynesboro, Mississippi	40488	D	1	0.1			31.677778°N 88.670278°W
WBTE	Windsor, North Carolina	172	D	1	0.025			35.966667°N 76.948333°W
WDCX	Rochester, New York	1906	B	5	2.5			43.231667°N 77.866667°W
WDEO	Ypsilanti, Michigan	73689	B	9.2	0.25			42.264722°N 83.613056°W (daytime); 42.265278°N 83.611667°W (nighttime)
WEEB	Southern Pines, North Carolina	52643	D	10	0.03	5		35.196111°N 79.412778°W (daytime and nighttime); 35.193611°N 79.411667°W (critical hours)
WEIS	Centre, Alabama	3619	D	1	0.03			34.15°N 85.685278°W
WGGI	Somerset, Pennsylvania	56364	D	10	0.1			40.025278°N 79.095°W
WGSO	New Orleans, Louisiana	52433	B	0.6	0.31			29.956944°N 90.159167°W
WISK	Lawrenceville, Georgia	63785	D	2.5				33.953056°N 83.970833°W
WITZ	Jasper, Indiana	30583	D	1	0.006			38.350556°N 86.940556°W
WLDX	Fayette, Alabama	60505	D	1	0.042			33.685°N 87.821111°W
WMYM	Kendall, Florida	12833	B	7.5	5			25.626389°N 80.521111°W
WNML	Knoxville, Tennessee	16894	B	10	10			36.0425°N 83.899722°W
WNRV	Narrows-Pearisburg, Virginia	67589	D	5	0.01			37.344167°N 80.776667°W
WNTP	Philadelphia, Pennsylvania	52194	B	50	10			40.095278°N 75.276944°W
WNTY	Southington, Connecticut	73352	D	2.5	0.08			41.583056°N 72.883611°W
WPRA	Mayaguez, Puerto Rico	1889	B	0.91	0.91			18.169167°N 67.150556°W
WREJ	Richmond, Virginia	50401	D	1	0.013			37.527778°N 77.38°W
WTIG	Massillon, Ohio	15282	D	0.25	0.112			40.8325°N 81.560833°W
WTLN	Orlando, Florida	23442	B	50	14			28.574167°N 81.462778°W
WWKY	Winchester, Kentucky	24221	D	1	0.02			38.013889°N 84.154444°W

== Venezuela ==
- YVRT in Caracas
- YVTA in Barquisimeto
