= KCNL =

KCNL may refer to:

- KCNL (FM), a radio station (105.9 FM) licensed to serve Quartzsite, Arizona, United States
- KCNL-LD, a low-power television station (channel 3) licensed to serve Reno, Nevada, United States
- KXSC (FM), a radio station (104.9 FM) licensed to serve Sunnyvale, California, United States, which held the call sign KCNL from 1999 to 2012
