= XECL-AM =

Radio station in Mexicali, Baja California, Mexico

- Mexicali, Baja California; Mexico
- Frequency: 990 AM
- Branding: Rocola 9 90

Programming
- Format: Spanish oldies / Disco and classic rock in English

Ownership
- Owner: Grupo Radiorama; (XECL-AM, S.A. de C.V.)
- Operator: Radiorama Mexicali
- Sister stations: KSEH, XHSU-FM/XESU-AM

History
- First air date: January 19, 1938

Technical information
- Licensing authority: CRT
- Class: B
- Power: 1.4 kW day 3 kW night

Links
- Webcast: Listen live
- Website: radioramamexicali.com

XECL-AM is a radio station in Mexicali, Baja California, Mexico, broadcasting on 990 AM.

== History ==
XECL is among Mexicali's oldest radio stations. Alfonso A. Lacarra received its concession on January 19, 1938, broadcasting with 5,000 watts of power from facilities at the intersection of Avenida Zaragoza and Calle F. One of the early announcers was Carlos Graham.

By the 1960s, Lacarra had died, leaving the station in the hands of his estate until 1996 when control passed to Silvia Lacarra Hinojosa. In 1998, Radiorama took over the concession under the subsidiary XECL-AM, S.A. It also reduced its power; now XECL broadcasts with more power at night than during the daytime.

In 2017, operation of the Radiorama Mexicali cluster, including XECL, was transferred to Sonora-based Grupo Larsa Comunicaciones. One year later, in September 2018, Radiorama took back operation of the station cluster.

On June 2, 2019, at midnight, XECL and XED-AM ceased operations. Twenty days later, on June 22, it was announced on the Facebook page of La Rocola 990 that it and XED would return to the air. 990 resumed broadcasting on July 22, 2019, while 1050 did not return until September 29.
