= XHEN-FM =

Radio station in Torreón, Coahuila, Mexico

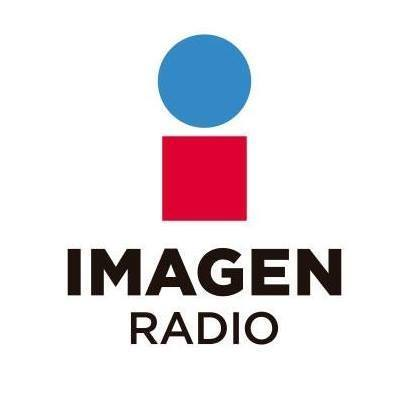
- Torreón, Coahuila; Mexico
- Broadcast area: Comarca Lagunera
- Frequency: 100.3 MHz
- Branding: Imagen Radio

Programming
- Format: News/talk

Ownership
- Owner: Grupo Imagen; (GIM Televisión Nacional, S.A. de C.V.)

History
- First air date: August 31, 1990 (concession)
- Call sign meaning: Original concessionaire Emilio Nasser

Technical information
- Licensing authority: CRT
- Class: B
- ERP: 30,000 watts
- HAAT: 259.9 m (853 ft)

Links
- Website: www.imagenlaguna.mx

XHEN-FM is a radio station on 100.3 FM in Torreón, Coahuila, Mexico. The station is owned by Grupo Imagen and carries its Imagen Radio news/talk format.

== History ==
XHEN received its concession on August 31, 1990. It was awarded to the successors of Emilio Nassar Hamze, whose initials are enshrined in its call sign. Nassar had been the ex-president of CIRT, the Mexican National Chamber of the Radio and Television Industry, and so was his son, Emilio Nassar Rodríguez. The family's Multimundo station group also owned three stations in Guanajuato and Querétaro: XHMIG-FM, XHOZ-FM, and XHOE-FM.

Originally known as Ultra 100.3, the station changed names to Kiss FM in the early 2000s. On June 1, 2007, most of Multimundo was acquired by Grupo Imagen. XHEN-FM became RMX, a pop and rock format used by XHAV-FM in Guadalajara, until switching to the Imagen Radio news/talk format in the early 2010s.
