= Kraz =

Kraz may refer to:

- KrAZ, a Ukrainian truck manufacturer
- Kraz, the proper name of the star Beta Corvi
- KRAZ, call sign FM radio station in Santa Barbara, California
