= Pequoig Hotel =

- U.S. National Register of Historic Places
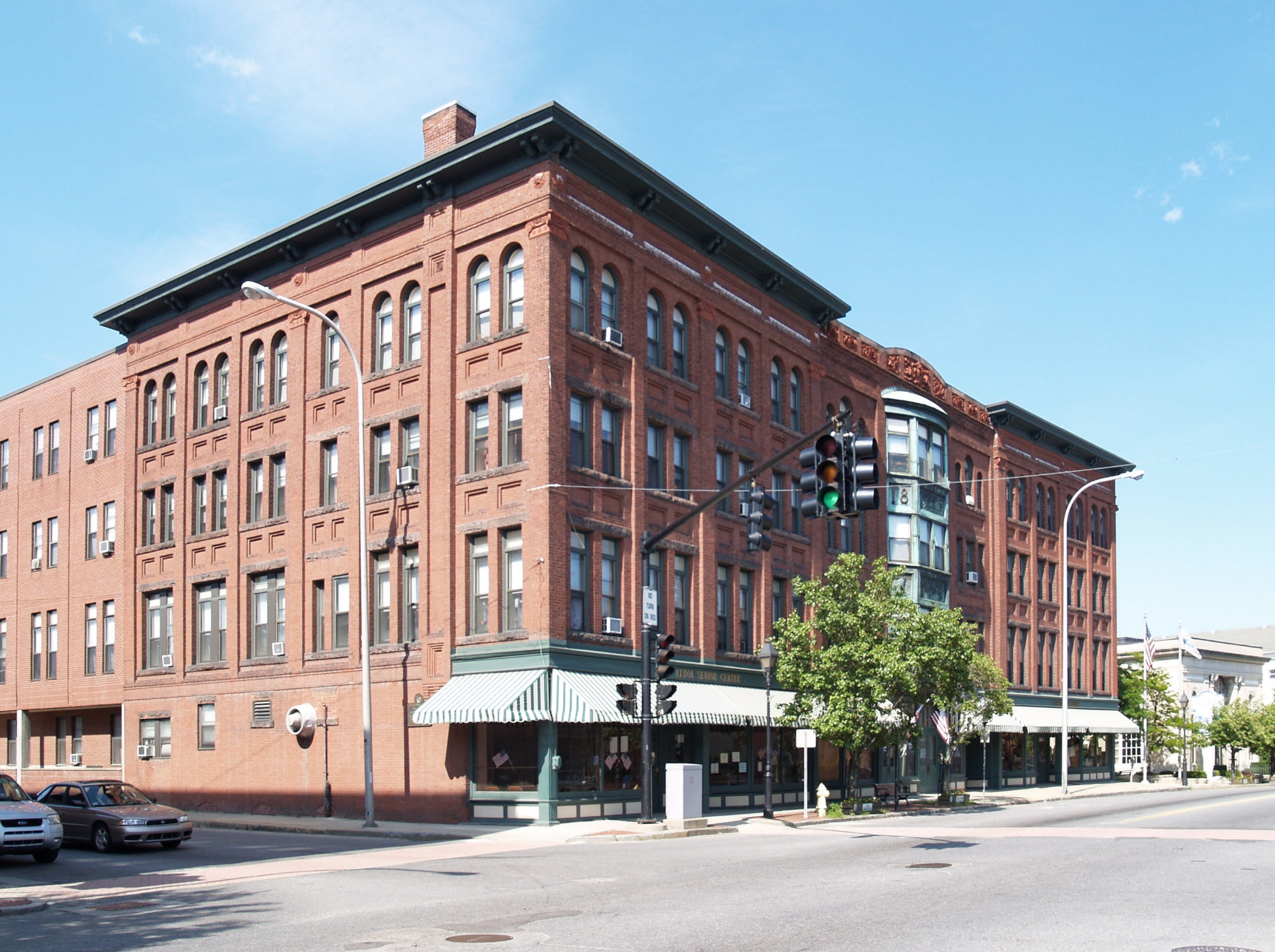

- Location within Massachusetts Location within the United States
- Location: 416 Main St., Athol, Massachusetts
- Coordinates: 42°35′39″N 72°13′53″W
- Area: less than one acre
- Built: 1894
- NRHP reference No.: 78000469
- Added to NRHP: November 17, 1978

The Pequoig Hotel is an historic former hotel building at 416 Main Street in Athol, Massachusetts. Built in 1894 by a leading local developer, it is downtown Athol's largest and most prominent building. After serving as a hotel into the 1950s, it was converted into a senior living facility in 1982. The building was listed on the National Register of Historic Places in 1978.

== Description and history ==
The former Pequoig Hotel stands in on the north side of Main Street in downtown Athol, at the northeast corner with Exchange Street. It is a tall four-story masonry structure, built out of red brick with granite and terra cotta trim. Its Main Street facade is eleven bays wide; the outer four bays on each end are articulated by paneled pilasters, and have paired windows topped by granite lintels. The top-floor windows have round-arch tops, and the roof line above has a deep projecting cornice. The center three bays have tripled windows around a central projecting oriel bay, rising to a terra cotta parapet. The Exchange Street facade continues the detailing of the adjacent Main Street bays. The ground floor storefronts have undergone alterations over the years in response to changing commercial needs.

The hotel was built in 1894 by Lucien Lord, a major local real estate developer, and is the best-preserved of the town's late 19th-century commercial buildings. It was at the time of its construction the largest non-industrial building in the town, and it served as a hotel until the 1950s. Its ground floor spaces continued to serve commercial purposes into the 1970s. After a period of vacancy, it was converted into a senior living center.

== See also ==
- National Register of Historic Places listings in Worcester County, Massachusetts
