= XHSCAM-FM =

Community radio station in Ziracuaretiro, Michoacán, Mexico

Ziracuaretiro, Michoacán; Mexico
- Frequency: 105.9 FM
- Branding: Radio Juchari

Programming
- Format: Community radio

Ownership
- Owner: Radio Juchari Iretarhu Anapu, A.C.

History
- Call sign meaning: (templated callsign)

Technical information
- Class: A
- ERP: 2.8 kW
- HAAT: -253.8 meters
- Transmitter coordinates: 19°26′49″N 101°53′19″W

Links
- Website: XHSCAM-FM on Facebook

XHSCAM-FM is a community radio station on 105.9 FM in Ziracuaretiro, Michoacán. The station is owned by the civil association Radio Juchari Iretarhu Anapu, A.C.

== History ==
Radio Juchari Iretarhu Anapu filed for a community station on October 10, 2016. The station's award was approved on May 23, 2018.
