= KMXX =

Radio station in Imperial, California

Coordinates: 32.911°N 115.529°W

- Imperial, California; United States
- Broadcast area: Imperial Valley, California
- Frequency: 99.3 MHz
- Branding: La Tricolor 99.3

Programming
- Format: Regional Mexican

Ownership
- Owner: Entravision Communications; (Entravision Holdings, LLC)
- Sister stations: KSEH; TV stations: KVYE, KAJB

History
- First air date: 1980
- Former call signs: KOZN (1980–1991); KBCD (1991–1993)

Technical information
- Licensing authority: FCC
- Facility ID: 6665
- Class: A
- ERP: 6,000 watts
- HAAT: 92 meters

Links
- Public license information: Public file; LMS
- Webcast: Listen Live

KMXX (99.3 FM) is a commercial radio station in Imperial, California, broadcasting to the Imperial Valley, California. The station is owned by Entravision Communications.

KMXX airs a syndicated regional Mexican music format branded as La Tricolor.
