= Athol, Massachusetts =

- Town
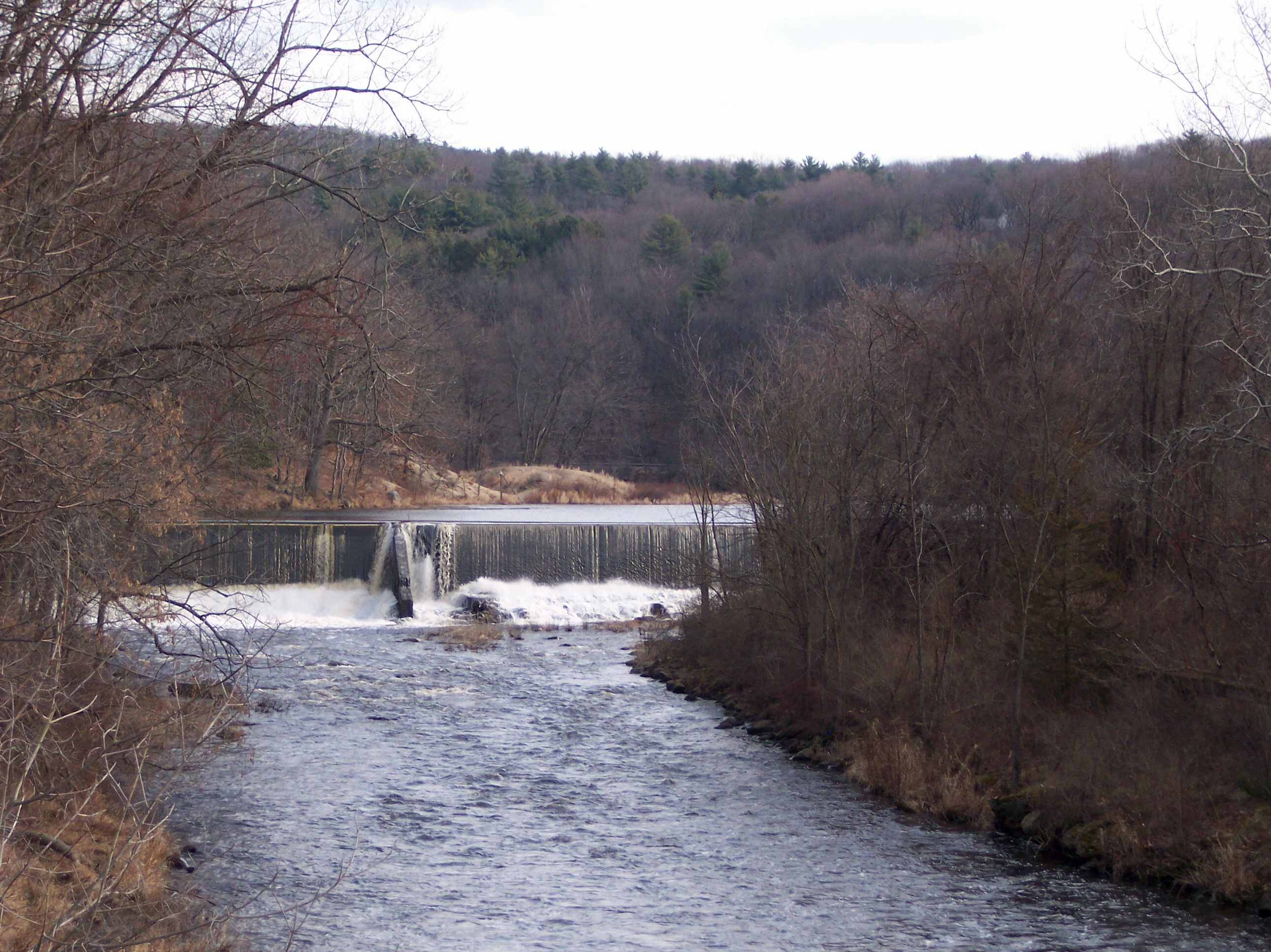
- Millers River

- Flag Seal
- Nickname: Tool Town
- Location in Worcester County and the state of Massachusetts.
- Coordinates: 42°35′45″N 72°13′38″W
- Country: United States
- State: Massachusetts
- County: Worcester
- Settled: 1735
- Incorporated: 1762

Government
  - Type: Open town meeting
  - Town Administrator: Shaun A. Suhoski

Area
  - Total: 33.4 sq mi (86.5 km^{2})
  - Land: 32.6 sq mi (84.4 km^{2})
  - Water: 0.81 sq mi (2.1 km^{2})
- Elevation: 545 ft (166 m)

Population (2024)
  - Total: 12,105
  - Density: 371/sq mi (143/km^{2})
- Time zone: UTC-5 (Eastern)
  - Summer (DST): UTC-4 (Eastern)
- ZIP Codes: 01331 (Athol); 01368 (Royalston)
- Area code: 351 / 978
- FIPS code: 25-02480
- GNIS feature ID: 0619473
- Website: www.athol-ma.gov

Athol (/ˈæθɒl/, ATH-awl) is a town in Worcester County, Massachusetts, United States. The population was 11,945 at the 2020 census. It contains the census-designated place of the same name.

== History ==
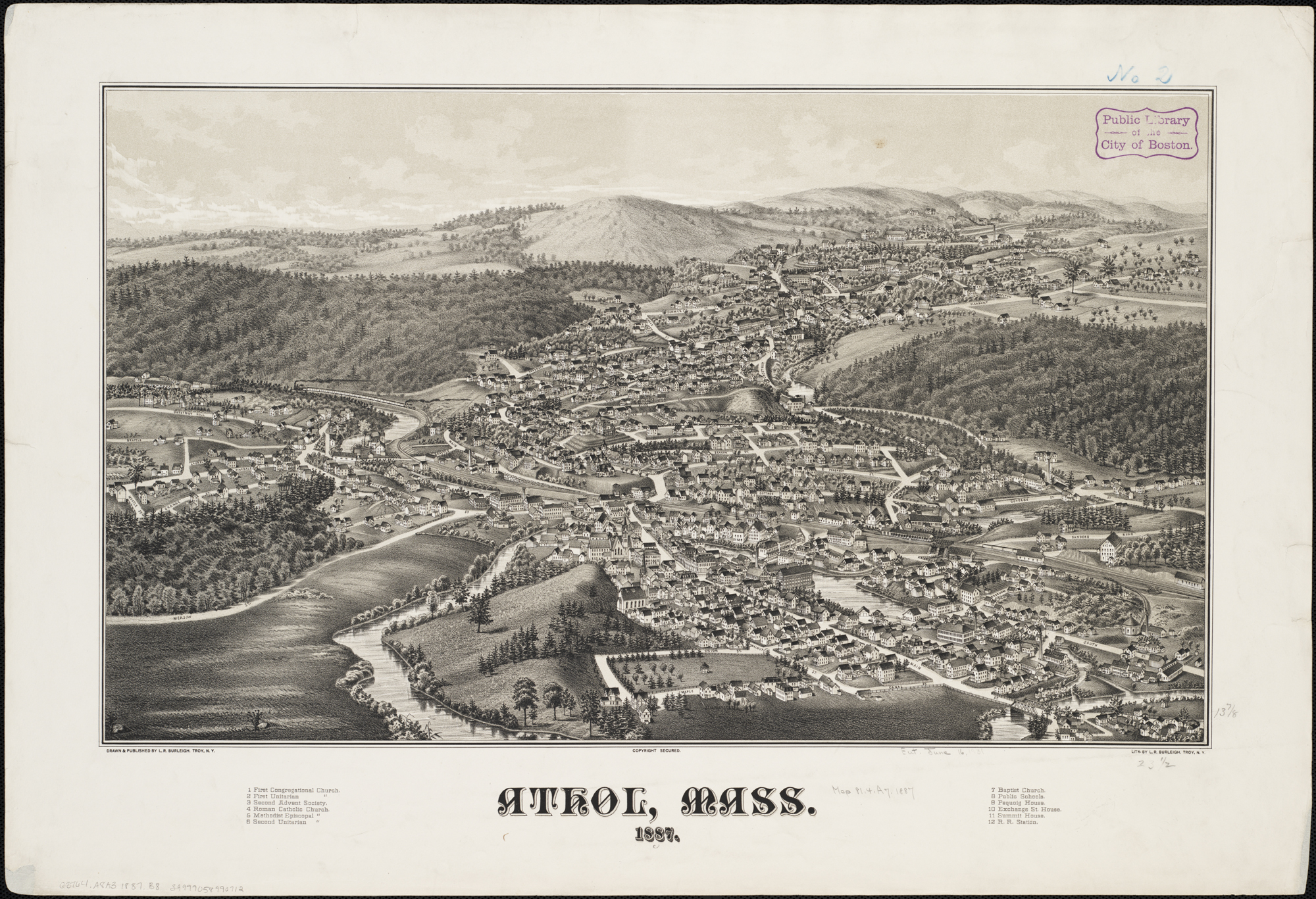
Print of Athol from 1887 by L.R. Burleigh with listing of landmarks

Originally called Pequoiag when settled by Native Americans, the area was subsequently settled by five families in September 1735. When the township was incorporated in 1762, the name was changed to Athol. John Murray, one of the proprietors of the land, chose the name which was believed to mean "New Ireland" although some historians, including James E. Fraser, dispute this definition.

Early residents subsisted on agriculture and hunting. By 1791, Athol had four gristmills, six sawmills, a fulling mill, and a shop with a trip hammer, all of which were operated by water power. The Athol Cotton Factory, built in 1811, was one of the first industries to serve a market beyond the local one. Through the 1800s, textile, leather, wood, and metal industries further expanded the market for goods produced in Athol. The construction of the Vermont and Massachusetts Railroad in the 1840s significantly boosted the industrial growth, prompting the construction of a second line connecting Athol and Springfield in 1870. Construction of the Fitchburg Railroad, an east-west line, came through Athol in 1879, on its way to the Hoosac Tunnel and the Berkshires.

The Athol Machine Company was established in 1868 in order to manufacture a chopping machine invented by Laroy S. Starrett. In 1881, Mr. Starrett established the L. S. Starrett Company, known for precision tools production. The company remains the town's largest employer to this day, letting Athol maintain the nickname, the "Tool Town".

Further development of industry along the river valley, stimulated population growth and incentivized commerce, on the hill southeast of the factories. This area, today called Uptown, was the location of the first bank. The first trolley lines, established in 1894, ran from Athol to Orange, and additional lines soon connected surrounding areas. Consistent development of industry, commerce, and transportation, made Athol the attraction point of the entire area at the start of the 20th century.

During the 1930s, the trolley lines closed due to the increased use of private automobiles, bus service, and overall economic instability. When four Swift River Valley towns were flooded to create the Quabbin Reservoir, the Springfield railroad route was abandoned. Consequently, Athol's growth leveled off as commerce became increasingly dependent on the Interstate Highway System. Population reached a peak of 12,186 in 1955.

The Route 2 bypass of Athol was constructed in the 1950s, further limiting direct access to the downtown business district. The following years showed population decline, falling to a low of 10,634 in 1980. However, Athol's population has risen gradually since that time.

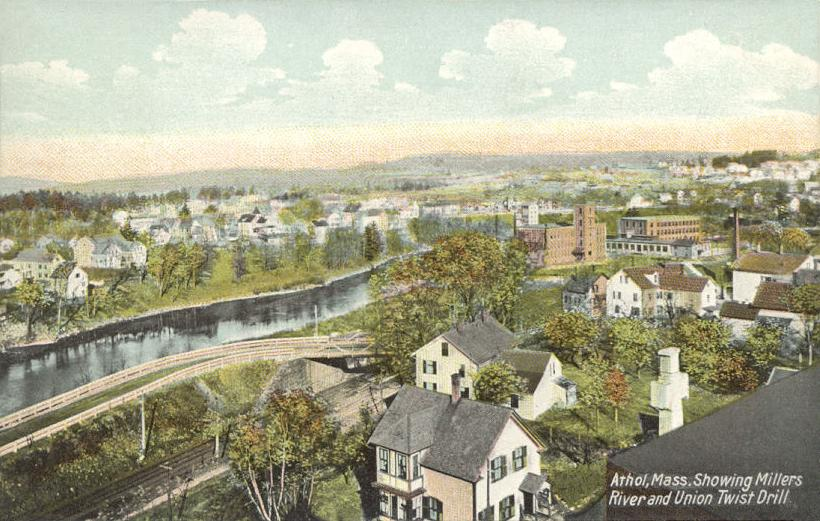
Bird's-eye view in 1908

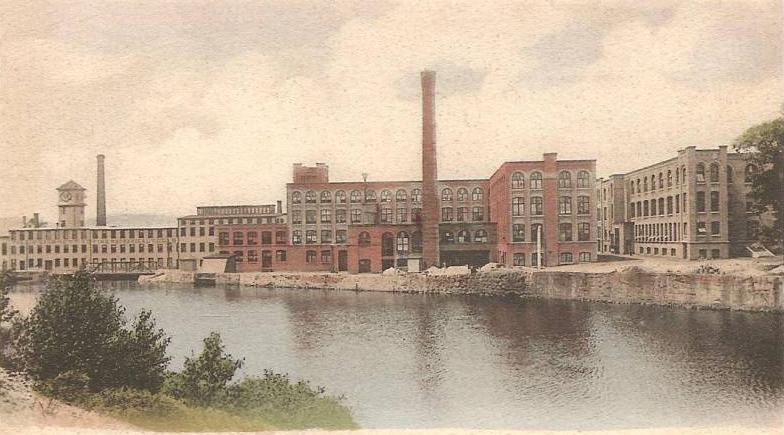
L. S. Starrett Co. in 1905

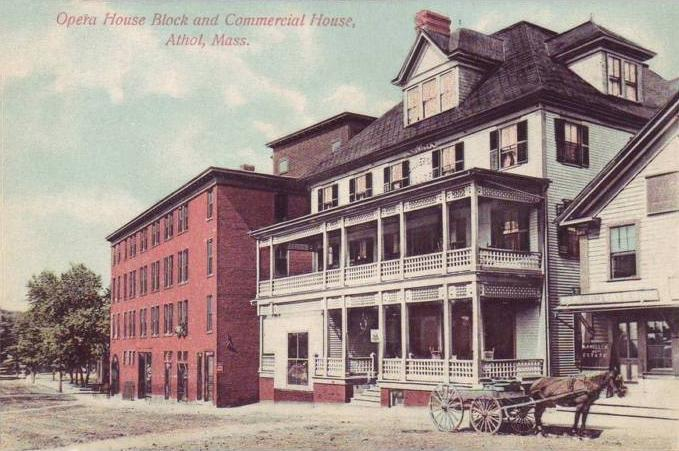
Opera House c. 1906

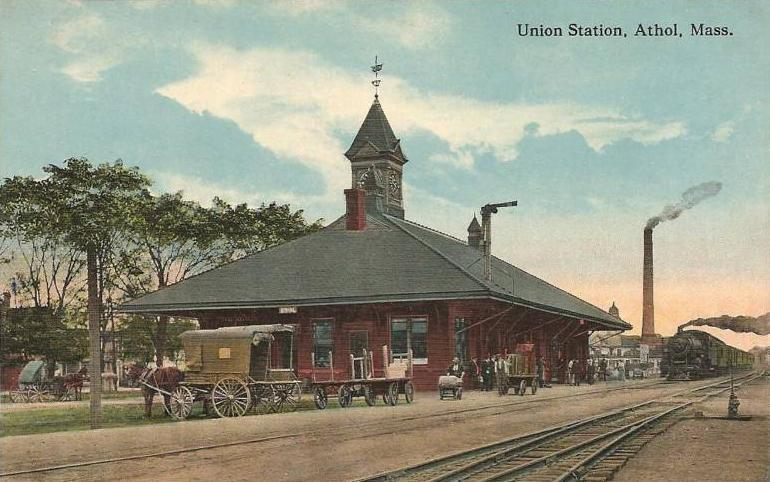
Union Station c. 1912

== Geography ==
According to the United States Census Bureau, the town has a total area of 33.4 square miles (86.5 km^{2}), of which 32.6 square miles (84.4 km^{2}) is land and 0.8 square miles (2.1 km^{2}) (2.46%) is water. The town is drained mostly by the Millers River, which flows through the downtown area from northeast to west, towards the Connecticut River. The Tully River flows into the Millers within town, and many other streams cross the town. Parts of Tully Lake and Lake Rohunta lie within town, as does Lake Ellis and several other small ponds. The soil of Athol is rough and stony, and the terrain is wooded and hilly, with elevations ranging from 500 feet (150 m) above sea level at the edge of the Millers River to 1,282 feet (391 m) at the top of Pratt Hill near the Bearsden Forest. A large portion of the Millers River Wildlife Management Area lies within town, as does a small portion of Petersham State Forest.

Athol lies along the western edge of Worcester County, with Franklin County to the west. It is bordered by Royalston to the north, Phillipston to the east, Petersham to the south, New Salem to the southwest, and Orange to the west. From its town center, Athol lies 23 miles (37 km) east of Greenfield, 25 miles (40 km) west of Fitchburg, 35 miles (56 km) northwest of Worcester, and 67 miles (108 km) west-northwest of Boston. The vast majority of population is settled around the downtown area, with the rest of the town being relatively sparsely populated.

== Economy ==
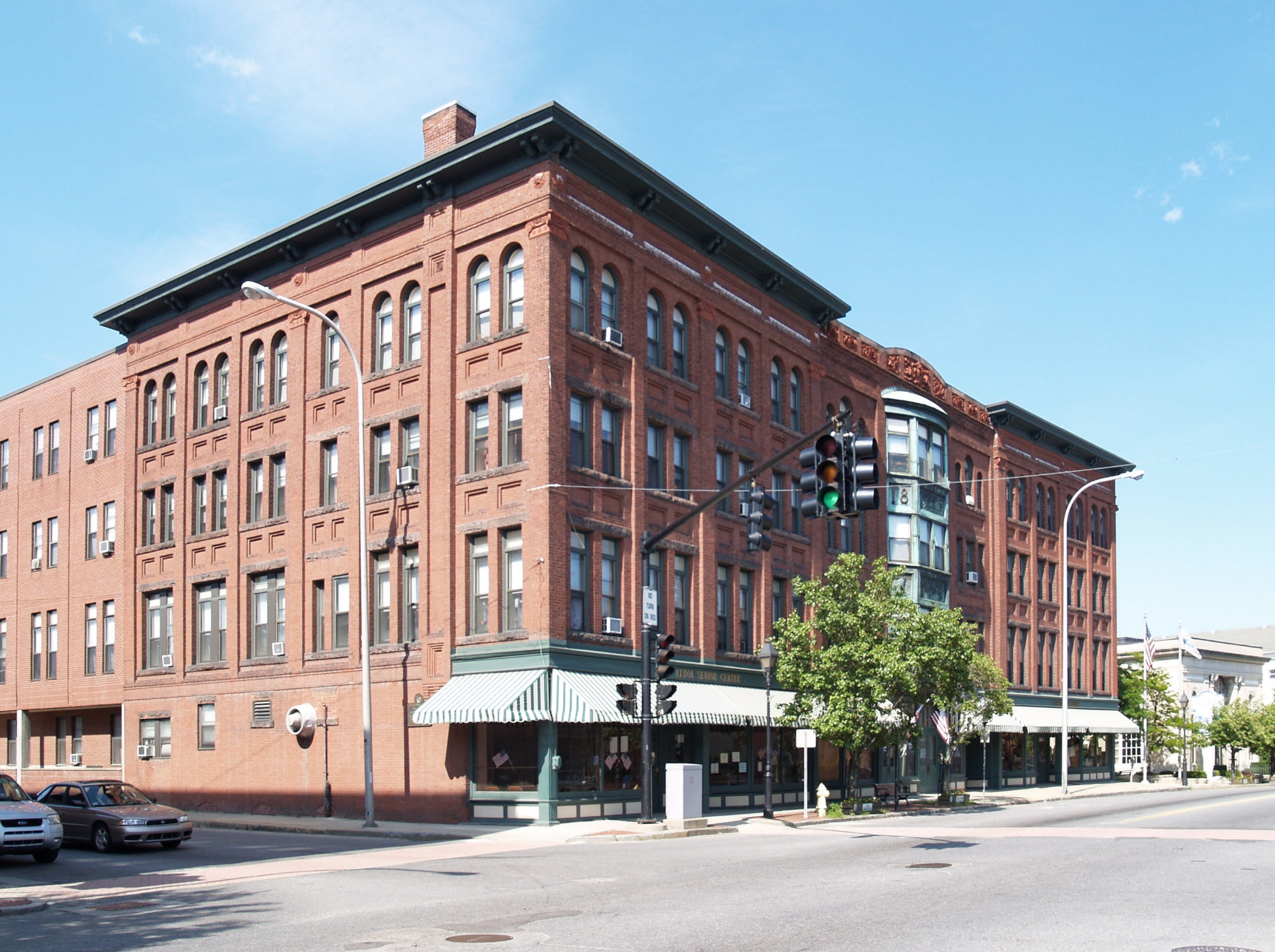
The historic Pequoig Hotel building, now an apartment complex and mini strip.

Since the Civil War, Athol's economy has been primarily industrial. During the early part of the 20th century, local water power and rail service attracted manufacturers such as Union Twist Drill and the L. S. Starrett Company to the area, leading to Athol's nickname "Tool Town". In the 1950s, when the Route 2 bypass, Interstate 495 and the Massachusetts Turnpike diverted traffic to other parts of Massachusetts, Athol and other towns in central Massachusetts began a long economic decline. By 1998, the commercial vacancy rate in Athol had risen to 18 percent.

Despite downsizing, the L. S. Starrett Company continues to be the largest employer in town, followed by the Athol Memorial Hospital. Most of the remaining jobs in Athol are in the retail and food service industries.

In the 1960s, Athol and Orange formed the Orange-Athol Industrial Development Commission to bring businesses to the area near the Orange Municipal Airport. The Millers River Community Development Corporation, North Quabbin Housing Partnership, and a banking alliance also grew out of collaborative efforts. These groups succeeded in financing housing for middle-income residents, natives, and others who were not accepted by traditional lending programs.

In the early 1980s, The state targeted the North Quabbin region (and principal towns Athol and Orange) for funding to promote economic development, as the area had the highest unemployment rate in the state. Small cities grants and other government funding provided a promising start of economic growth until a recession hit

In the 1990s, a Walmart opened in Orange close to the town line of Athol. At that time, several businesses on Athol's Main Street closed.

In the 2010s, Athol saw the development of a new shopping plaza. The plaza is anchored by a Market Basket and includes a movie theatre as well as several retail and dining establishments. There was also industrial development, with a portion of the former Union Twist Drill mill undergoing conversion for use by Massgrow as a marijuana-growing facility.

In the 2020s, The town has seen two dispensaries open, as well as several new restaurants. Main Street has also seen several new business open, leading to a lower storefront vacancy rate than in the past decade.

As of 2022, groups working on Athol's economy include the Economic Development and Industrial Corporation, a quasi-public entity, and the North Quabbin Chamber of Commerce, located on Main Street in Athol.

== Demographics ==
Historical population
Year	Pop.	±%
1790	848	—
1850	2,034	+139.9%
1860	2,604	+28.0%
1870	3,517	+35.1%
1880	4,307	+22.5%
1890	6,319	+46.7%
1900	7,061	+11.7%
1910	8,536	+20.9%
1920	9,792	+14.7%
1930	10,677	+9.0%
1940	11,180	+4.7%
1950	11,554	+3.3%
1960	11,637	+0.7%
1970	11,185	−3.9%
1980	10,634	−4.9%
1990	11,451	+7.7%
2000	11,299	−1.3%
2010	11,584	+2.5%
2020	11,945	+3.1%
2022	11,897	−0.4%
Source: United States Census records and Population Estimates Program data.

As of the census of 2000, there were 11,299 people, 4,487 households, and 2,970 families residing in the town. The population density was 346.9 inhabitants per square mile (133.9/km^{2}). There were 4,824 housing units at an average density of 148.1 per square mile (57.2/km^{2}). The racial makeup of the town was 96.33% White, 0.65% Black or African American, 0.35% Native American, 0.42% Asian, 0.03% Pacific Islander, 0.73% from other races, and 1.48% from two or more races. Hispanic or Latino of any race were 1.96% of the population. 17.7% were of French, 14.1% French Canadian, 13.3% English, 10.9% Irish, 10.4% Italian and 5.3% American ancestry according to Census 2000.

There were 4,487 households, out of which 31.6% had children under the age of 18 living with them, 49.1% were married couples living together, 12.1% had a female householder with no husband present, and 33.8% were non-families. 28.4% of all households were made up of individuals, and 12.9% had someone living alone who was 65 years of age or older. The average household size was 2.46 and the average family size was 3.00.

In the town, the population was spread out, with 25.4% under the age of 18, 7.9% from 18 to 24, 27.9% from 25 to 44, 21.6% from 45 to 64, and 17.2% who were 65 years of age or older. The median age was 39 years. For every 100 females, there were 93.8 males. For every 100 females age 18 and over, there were 88.5 males.

The median income for a household in the town was $43,221, and the median income for a family was $49,440. Males had a median income of $34,414 versus $23,156 for females. The per capita income for the town was $21,267. About 8.3% of families and 9.4% of the population were below the poverty line, including 10.8% of those under age 18 and 8.4% of those age 65 or over.

== Government ==
County government: Worcester County
Clerk of Courts:	Dennis P. McManus (D)
District Attorney:	David E. Sullivan (D)
Register of Deeds:	Katie Toomey (D)
Register of Probate:	Stephanie Fattman (R)
County Sheriff:	Lew Evangelidis (R)
State government
State Representative(s):	Susannah Whipps (I)
State Senator(s):	Jo Comerford (D)
Governor's Councilor(s):	Tara Jacobs (D)
Federal government
U.S. Representative(s):	James P. McGovern (D-2nd District),
U.S. Senators:	Elizabeth Warren (D), Ed Markey (D)

Municipal Government

- Town Manager: Shaun Suhoski
- Selectboard: Andrew Sudjak, Rebecca Bialecki, Kala Fisher, Stephen Raymond, Brian Dodge

Municipal government is by open town meeting. Athol is divided into three precincts. The first Monday in April is the date for the annual town election. The annual town meeting is held in May, and a fall town meeting occurs in October. Additional town meetings are held as needed. Administration of the town's business is carried out by a five-member elected board of selectmen and a town manager following the Town Charter, which was passed in 2000. Other important town boards are the Finance and Warrant Advisory Committee, Planning Board, Conservation Commission, Historical Commission, Capital Program Committee, Cable Advisory Board, Council on Aging, Economic Development and Industrial Corporation, Housing Authority, Open Space and Recreation Review Committee, Library Trustees, and Zoning Board of Appeals.

The Athol-Royalston Regional School Committee is jointly elected by the communities of Athol and Royalston. Ten members serve on this vital committee, seven from Athol and three from Royalston based upon the regional agreement.

The Athol Fire Department and Athol Police Department provide fire protection and law enforcement respectively. In addition, a Massachusetts State Police barracks is located in Athol near the high school. The Department of Public Works takes care of roadways, water works, sewage treatment, parks, and cemeteries.

The towns of Athol and Orange cooperate with each other as neighbors, in spite of the county line that divides them. Some service providers for Athol are based in Franklin County, even though Athol sits in Worcester County.

== Communications ==
Athol has a daily newspaper, The Athol Daily News. In addition, the Worcester Telegram & Gazette, the Greenfield Recorder, and The Gardner News cover Athol events and news. Newspapers from Boston, Springfield, and Fitchburg are also sold in local stores.

Time Warner Cable provides service to 6,646 subscribers in the Athol-Orange area. 4,044 live in Athol. The two-town area also benefits from the work of the Athol-Orange Community Television, Inc. (AOTV), which is a nonprofit Public-access television cablecasting corporation. AOTV trains people to produce their own local Public-access television programs, and it records and airs Government-access television (GATV) public meetings and events through the Time Warner system. AOTV also operates Athol licensed radio station WVAO-LP 105.9 FM.

In addition to WVAO-LP, WKMY 99.9 FM, and WQVD 700 AM are also local radio stations in Athol and Orange (Although WKMY is only a satellite signal of the national Educational Media Foundation K-Love radio network, and has no local programming). Additional broadcast stations from Gardner, Greenfield, Keene, New Hampshire, Springfield, Worcester, and Boston can be heard. WJDF 97.3 used to also serve the area, but their license was revoked in 2019 for failing to pay FCC regulatory fees.

A number of Internet service providers have dial-up access numbers based in Petersham, which is a local telephone call from Athol. High speed Internet is available in selected areas of town through Road Runner (Time Warner), Verizon and other vendors.

== Transportation ==
Though residents can often walk to businesses in the downtown and uptown districts, Athol is primarily dependent on the automobile for out-of-town transportation. Athol lies along Route 2, the major east-west route through northern Massachusetts. It passes concurrently with U.S. Route 202 as a limited access highway through town, with its old route, now Route 2A, passing through downtown Athol. Route 2A provides access to Orange to the west and Gardner to the east. Route 2 provides access to Greenfield (20 miles to the west), Gardner (11 miles east), Fitchburg (25 miles east), and Boston (71 miles east). Worcester is 34 miles (55 km) from Athol via Routes 32 and 122 in Petersham. Keene, New Hampshire, is 25 miles (40 km) north via Route 32. For 1.4 miles (2.3 km), Route 32 runs concurrently with Route 2A, coming north from Petersham east of downtown before continuing north along the eastern edge of downtown towards Royalston.

Athol is served by several bus lines. The Franklin Regional Transit Authority (FRTA), based in Greenfield, has daily runs from Athol to points west. The Montachusett Area Regional Transit (MART), based in Fitchburg, can take residents to points east of town. Community Transit Service buses provide dial-a-ride service for those people in Athol, Orange, and Winchendon, who are in need of transportation to work, medical appointments, shopping, or other errands. Intercity bus service run by Greyhound and Peter Pan Bus Lines is available at Amherst, Greenfield, Leominster, Northampton, Springfield, Worcester, and Keene.

The nearest general aviation airport to Athol is the Orange Municipal Airport, with the nearest national air service airports being Bradley International Airport to the southwest and Manchester-Boston Regional Airport to the north, both of which are an hour's drive away.

The town still has its old train station downtown (the depot), along the Pan Am Railways freight main, formerly a part of the Vermont and Massachusetts Railroad. Before the filling of the Quabbin Reservoir, Athol was the end of the Springfield, Athol and North-eastern Railroad, a spur line off the Boston and Albany Railroad. A proposal known as "Northern Tier Passenger Rail" is in the early stages of planning, and would extend MBTA's Fitchburg Line westward through Athol and Greenfield, terminating at North Adams. This service would restore passenger rail to the region for the first time since the 1950s.

== Education ==
The Athol-Royalston Regional School District educates young people from grades Pre-K to 12. Two elementary schools educate students: the Athol Community Elementary School (Pre-K to 4) and the Royalston Community School (K–6). The Athol-Royalston Middle School consists of grades 5 to 8, and Athol High School is made up of students in grades 9 through 12. Athol High School has many different classes in this day in age. Classes are 75 minute intervals for 5 periods. District enrollment for the 2004–2005 school year was 2,140 students. Interested individuals may attend the Montachusett Regional Vocational Technical School in Fitchburg on a tuition basis, subject to the approval of school authorities. Athol High School had been threatened with loss of accreditation; the school district and community members rallied around initiatives to restore a full accreditation for the school.

The closest community colleges are Mount Wachusett Community College in Gardner and Greenfield Community College in Greenfield. Programs leading to bachelor's degrees and higher courses of study can be found in Amherst, Fitchburg State, Worcester, and Keene. A few students choose to further their education at institutions elsewhere in New England, around the country, or online.

Private day care centers and nursery schools provide stimulation and social learning opportunities for the young child. Each week, the Athol Public Library holds several preschool activities which invite caretakers and small children to visit the library, play with educational toys, read or hear stories, do crafts, and interact with others. The Athol Area YMCA also schedules activities appropriate for children ages 6 months through kindergarten, and has a preschool and nursery school, as well as after-school daycare.

The Athol Public Library was established in 1882 with 1,063 books and $300. The library was rebuilt in 1918 with private donations. It was the first building in Athol to have air conditioning as of 1969.

== Culture ==
Athol is geographically isolated from the major cultural centers of Massachusetts; consequently, its residents tend to create their own entertainment. The town is known for producing many skilled musicians of all genres. Productions and programs are initiated by such organizations as the Athol Area YMCA, the Athol Historical Society, the Athol-Orange Rotary, the schools, and the Athol Public Library. The Athol Cultural Council provides funds for some of these programs.

Since the Athol Public Library has inadequate facilities for large group seating, its largest annual program is presented in conjunction with and at the home of the Athol Historical Society. The Friends of the Athol Public Library also provide funds for smaller programs held at the library, like young adult craft workshops and author visits and book-signings. The library has a Teen Advisory Council called ATAC who work with the young-adult librarian to provide weekly programs for young adults. The children's library provides several programs a week for preschool, toddler and preteens.

Several community groups such as the Athol Lions Club provide annual entertainment for the community such as the Summerfest and River Rat Race. On the second week of April each year, the town's largest event is a local canoe race named "The River Rat Race". Thousands of spectators line the banks of the Millers River to watch 300 plus canoes race from Athol to Orange. A parade is held in the morning the day of the race, and a carnival is held at the Lord Pond Plaza. Other popular town activities are listed below in the Culture section and are available through the North Quabbin Chamber of Commerce.

In the summer and early fall, "Tool Town Live!" weekend concerts are held in the Uptown Common and at Fish Park in the western part of town. Begun in 2004, this popular series features talented groups from around New England who represent a variety of musical genres. The concerts are offered free of charge, supported by car washes and other fund-raisers held earlier in the year.

The Athol Historical Society, a group of private citizens, occupies the old town hall in the uptown area. The building houses a museum exhibiting articles from Athol's storied past. Additionally, the society sponsors talks about local history, provides guided tours of historic sites, and holds special events. The L.S. Starrett Tool Museum, located at the company office, has on display machine tools of the past. Visitors are admitted by appointment only, made with the personnel department of the company. Impressive restoration was done recently utilizing grant funding with private donations.

The Millers River Environmental Center on Main Street, housed in the old Main Street School, provides many programs to the public and is home to the Athol Bird and Nature Club.

== Recreation and entertainment ==
Athol and its surroundings offer many opportunities for enjoying the outdoors. Clubs like the Woodsman Rifle and Pistol Club and the Athol Bird and Nature Club focus on specific outdoor interests.

Some of those activities center around the Millers River. The River Rat Race, an annual canoe race held each spring, draws participants from all parts of New England. The 6-mile (9.7 km) race begins at Cass Meadow in Athol and ends at Hachey's Landing in Orange.

Athol's location on the Millers River enabled it to qualify in 2002 for the UrbanRiver Visions project, an initiative designed to capitalize on the potential of the river as a focal point for revitalization of downtowns in Massachusetts.

Six historic public nature areas are administered by the Athol Conservation Commission. The largest of these is Bearsden Forest in the northeastern part of Athol. It contains hiking trails, camping areas, bridges, paths, old quarries, ponds and brooks.

Eco-tourism and supporting environmental interests are popular throughout the North Quabbin region. The Millers River Environmental Center is located in a former elementary school building on Main Street. It offers exhibits and events and is also the home of the Athol Bird and Nature Club. The Mount Grace Land Conservation Trust, based in Athol, protects significant natural, agricultural, and scenic areas and encourages land stewardship in North Central and Western Massachusetts for the benefit of the environment, the economy and future generations. Organizations such as these help to preserve the beauty and natural resources that bring people to the Athol area. The Alan E. Rich Environmental Park, dedicated to a beloved deceased Selectman, sits proudly near the Millers River bridge on Main Street and provides habitat for native plants. It provides parking along with canoe, kayak and small boat access to the Millers River. It is adjacent to Cass Meadow which has 14 acres (57,000 m^{2}) of trails featuring opportunities to view birds, butterflies and dragonflies.

The southern part of Athol, bordered by the Harvard Forest and the Quabbin Reservoir, offers picturesque hiking trails. The town owns Fish Park, Silver Lake, and Lake Ellis, where people can swim, skate, play tennis, or play ball.

Athol has additional recreational facilities. The Ellinwood Country Club offers an 18-hole golf course, banquet facilities, and a clubhouse for its members. The downtown Athol Area YMCA includes a 4-lane 25 yard pool, full size gym, workout equipment and group exercise program. Courses are offered in sports skills and practical arts. The Y also hold recreation leagues for youth soccer and basketball. A Y-sponsored camp for local children, Camp Wiyaka, is located just across the border in New Hampshire. Fresh Air Camps, organized by Boston's Goodwill Industries, operate a multi-acre facility south of the town, in South Athol.

Recreational activities for children and young adults are provided by the Boy Scouts, Girl Scouts, and Campfire Girls. The Athol Recreation Department sponsors summer programs for youths at local school playgrounds. Social and fraternal organizations such as the Athol Women's Club, the Elks, Lions and Rotary clubs, Veterans of Foreign Wars and the Masonic Lodge, offer a wide range of activities for families and individuals. Chuck Stone Little League, one of the oldest Little League programs in the state, offers baseball and softball programs for Athol and Royalston youth.

The Silver Lake Wiffleball League plays on Tuesday and Thursday nights between April and September at Silver Lake Park. The league is open to all adults and is free of charge.

== Notable people ==
- Dave Bargeron, musician, trombonist and tuba player for Blood, Sweat, and Tears
- Jimmy Barrett, baseball center fielder for three teams
- Philip Bezanson, composer and educator
- Asa Drury, educator and Baptist minister
- Daniel Francis Feehan, bishop
- Isaac Fitzgerald, writer
- Gregory Gibson, author
- George Henry Hoyt, attorney, politician, and Union officer
- Ellen Cheney Johnson, prison reformer
- John Murray, early proprietor
- Shawn Patterson, composer and writer of the song "Everything Is Awesome"
- Kenny Roberts, country music singer, champion yodeler
- Lysander Spooner, philosopher, abolitionist and writer
- Charles Starrett, actor
- Laroy S. Starrett, industrialist
- Charles H. Sweetser, author, journalist and editor
- Ginery Twichell, railroad president and congressman
- Donald Goddard Wing, Yale librarian

== See also ==
- List of mill towns in Massachusetts
