= KRMO =

- Cassville, Missouri; United States
- Broadcast area: 4-State Region
- Frequency: 990 kHz

Programming
- Format: Country music
- Affiliations: ABC News Radio

Ownership
- Owner: Eagle Broadcasting, Inc.

History
- Call sign meaning: Rural MissOuri

Technical information
- Licensing authority: FCC
- Facility ID: 43473
- Class: D
- Power: 2,500 watts day 47 watts night
- Transmitter coordinates: 36°56′15.00″N 93°55′30.00″W

Links
- Public license information: Public file; LMS
- Webcast: Listen Live
- Website: www.radiotalon.com/index.php/krmo

KRMO (990 AM) is a radio station broadcasting a country music format. It is licensed to Cassville, Missouri, United States, and serves the Joplin area. The station is owned by Eagle Broadcasting, Inc. and features programming from ABC News Radio.

990 AM is a Canadian clear-channel frequency.

The station’s tower collapsed on October 24, 2024.
