= John Murray (Massachusetts politician) =

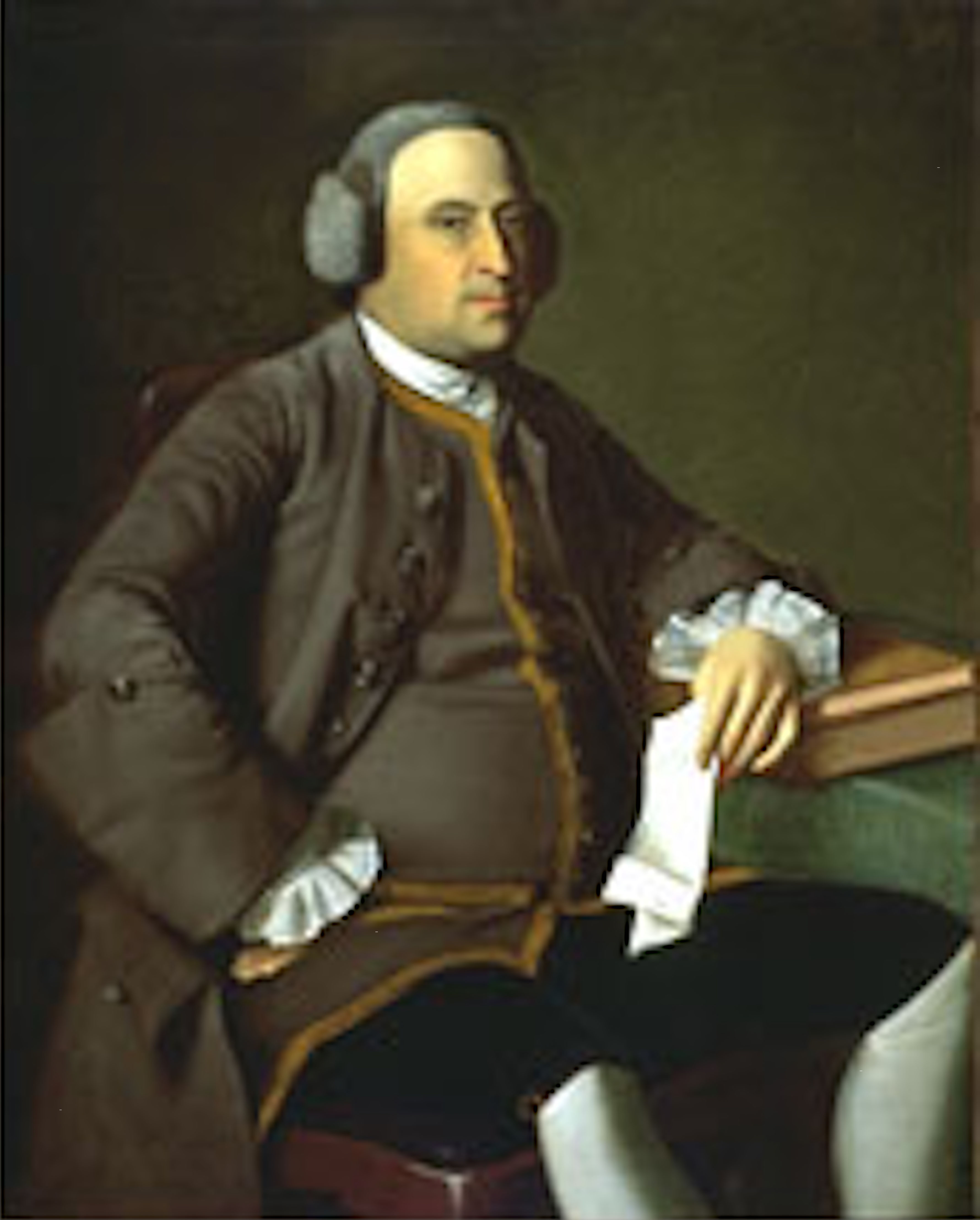
- Born: 22 December 1722; Ireland
- Died: 30 August 1794 (aged 71) Saint John, New Brunswick, Canada
- Buried: Loyalist Burial Ground. Later re-interred in the Botsford plot in Fernhill Cemetery, Saint John, NB.
- Allegiance: King George III
- Rank: Lieutenant colonel
- Known for: Treason, Banishment, Confiscation Act of 1779
- Education: Harvard University
- Spouses: Elizabeth McClanathan (d.1760); Lucretia Chandler (married 1761–68); Deborah Brinley (m. 1770)
- Children: 7

John Murray was the elected Representative to the Great and General Court of the Province of Massachusetts Bay from 1751 to 1774 for Rutland, Rutland's Northwest District and later for Hubbardston and Oakham. He was principal in the transactional and legislative founding of Barre, Oakham, Athol and Hubbardston. Often honored by the colonial government he was driven from his home in August of 1774 and forced to flee to Boston.

== Biography ==
Murray immigrated to New England in August of 1718 as a boy with the McClanathan, Shaw and Savage families. These Scotch-Irish people numbering some 750 came on five ships from Northern Ireland, an arrangement that had been brokered by Cotton Mather with the colonial government, they originally settled Worcester but after their Presbyterian church had been razed most moved on to Rutland. Murray married Elizabeth McClanathan in 1742 in Bondsville and Lucrecia Chandler the daughter of John Chandler (sheriff) in 1761. Because he was the first named proprietor whose grant was from the King and because he was from Rutland Massachusetts, Murray is credited with naming Rutland, Vermont. After the War of Independence he finally settled in a house on Prince William Street in Saint John, New Brunswick he died on August 30, 1794, and is buried there.

== Public service ==
Murray served in Rutland as a Selectman and then was elected to Town Clerk in 1742 and to Assessor in 1747. During the French and Indian War he served as a Lieutenant Colonel.

== August 24, 1774 ==
After the assault on the Timothy Paine House on Wednesday August 24, 1774 some of rebels marched to Rutland to force Murray to resign as Mandamus Councillor. They stoned his house breaking the windows and terrified Murray and his family. Murray fled to Boston where he was garrisoned until Evacuation Day (Massachusetts) March 17, 1776.
