= Athol Hospital =

Hospital in Athol, Massachusetts

- Heywood Healthcare

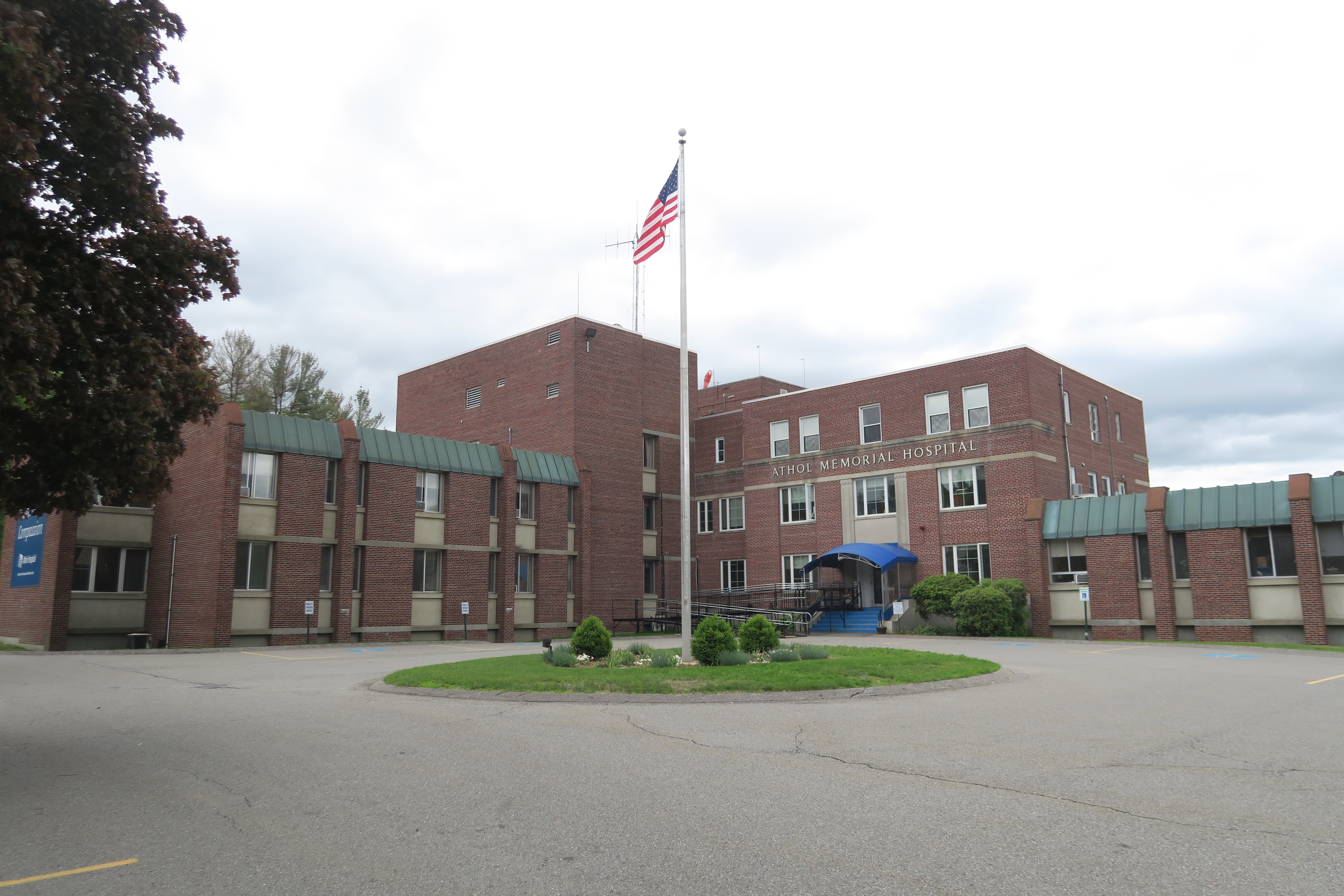

Geography
- Location: Athol, Massachusetts, United States
- Coordinates: 42°35′09.0″N 72°12′33.0″W

Organization
- Type: Community

Services
- Standards: Joint Commission
- Emergency department: Yes
- Beds: 25

Helipads
- Helipad: Yes

History
- Former name: Athol Memorial Hospital
- Opened: 1950

Links
- Website: atholhospital.org
- Lists: Hospitals in Massachusetts

Athol Hospital (formerly Athol Memorial Hospital) is a small 25-bed community hospital located in Athol, Massachusetts.

Athol Hospital was founded in 1950 through an effort by members of the community and local businesses to establish a hospital in their town, helped by a donation of land by local inventor Addison Sawyer. The hospital itself was named in memory of soldiers from Athol who were killed in action during World War II.

In 2013, following a period of financial difficulty in which the hospital had four days of cash on hand and only one bed in use, Athol Memorial Hospital merged with Heywood Hospital of Gardner, forming Heywood Healthcare. The hospital was renamed Athol Hospital following the merger.

While the hospital remains open, its future is uncertain following Heywood Healthcare's 2023 filing for Chapter 11 bankruptcy.
