= KAJB =

Television station in Calipatria, California

- Calipatria–El Centro, California; Yuma, Arizona; United States
- City: Calipatria, California
- Channels: Digital: 36 (UHF); Virtual: 54
- Branding: UniMás Yuma–El Centro

Programming
- Affiliations: 54.1: UniMás; for others, see § Subchannels

Ownership
- Owner: Calipatria Broadcasting Company, LLC
- Operator: Entravision Communications via JSA
- Sister stations: KVYE, KSEH, KMXX

History
- First air date: March 9, 2000
- Former channel numbers: Analog: 54 (UHF, 2000–2009)
- Former affiliations: Independent (2000–2002)

Technical information
- Licensing authority: FCC
- Facility ID: 40517
- ERP: 155 kW
- HAAT: 476 m (1,562 ft)
- Transmitter coordinates: 33°3′2″N 114°49′41″W

Links
- Public license information: Public file; LMS
- Website: UniMás

KAJB (channel 54) is a television station licensed to Calipatria, California, United States, serving the Yuma, Arizona–El Centro, California market as an affiliate of the Spanish-language network UniMás. It is owned by Calipatria Broadcasting Company, which maintains a joint sales agreement (JSA) which Entravision Communications, owner of El Centro–licensed Univision affiliate KVYE (channel 7), for the provision of certain services. Both stations share studios on North Imperial Avenue in El Centro, while KAJB's transmitter is located atop Black Mountain.

== Technical information ==
=== Subchannels ===
The station's signal is multiplexed:

Subchannels of KAJB
Channel	Res.	Short name	Programming
54.1	1080i	KAJB-DT	UniMás
54.2	480i	LATV	LATV
54.3	480i	TBD	[Blank]
54.4	480i	Stadium	[Blank]
54.5	480i	Bounce	Bounce TV

=== Analog-to-digital conversion ===
KAJB was originally assigned UHF channel 50 for its digital companion channel, however, with Mexican television station XHRCS-TV broadcasting on the same frequency from San Luis Rio Colorado, Sonora, KAJB could not build its facilities without causing interference. The station released its allocation and participated in the FCC second round elections, selecting UHF channel 36 for its digital allocation instead. After years of efforts to obtain Mexican coordination for the use of channel 36, KAJB was granted a construction permit to build digital facilities in August 2008, nearly nine years after requesting authorization, and began airing in March 2009. Digital television receivers display the station's virtual channel as its former UHF analog channel 54, which was among the high band UHF channels (52-69) that were removed from broadcasting use as a result of the transition.
