= KVYE =

Television station in El Centro, California

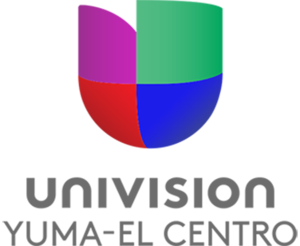
- El Centro, California; Yuma, Arizona; Mexicali, Baja California; San Luis Río Colorado, Sonora; United States–Mexico
- City: El Centro, California
- Channels: Digital: 22 (UHF); Virtual: 7
- Branding: Univision Yuma–El Centro (general); Noticias Univision El Centro (newscasts)

Programming
- Affiliations: 7.1: Univision; for others, see § Subchannels

Ownership
- Owner: Entravision Communications; (Entravision Holdings, LLC)
- Sister stations: KAJB, KMXX, KSEH

History
- First air date: June 1996
- Former call signs: KXLO (CP, 1991–1996)
- Former channel numbers: Analog: 7 (VHF, 1996–2009)
- Call sign meaning: Univision Yuma–El Centro

Technical information
- Licensing authority: FCC
- Facility ID: 36170
- ERP: 1,000 kW
- HAAT: 477.4 m (1,566 ft)
- Transmitter coordinates: 33°3′2.1″N 114°49′40.9″W

Links
- Public license information: Public file; LMS
- Website: noticiaselcentro.com

KVYE (channel 7) is a television station licensed to El Centro, California, United States, serving the Yuma, Arizona–El Centro, California market as an affiliate of the Spanish-language network Univision. It is owned by Entravision Communications, which provides certain services to Calipatria, California–licensed UniMás affiliate KAJB (channel 54) under a joint sales agreement (JSA) with Calipatria Broadcasting Company. The two stations share studios on North Imperial Avenue in El Centro; KVYE's transmitter is located atop Black Mountain.

== History ==
The Federal Communications Commission (FCC) granted an original construction permit on August 3, 1989, to build a television station licensed in El Centro. Before its license grant, the permit was extended four times and modified twice. On March 23, 1994, the FCC canceled the permit, but restored it five days later.

The station made its debut in June 1996; however, the station maintained its construction permit status.

On March 15, 1998, Entravision Communications (which operated KVYE under a local marketing agreement) bought station licensee La Paz Wireless Corporation for $700.000. Entravision obtained the initial license for the station on November 26, 1999.

On November 8, 2002, the FCC granted a permit to construct the station's digital facilities (requested in 1999). The station completed construction of its full-power digital facilities in June 2007, and was granted a license on January 29, 2010.

In February 2017, KVYE began to carry Azteca América on 7.2; prior to this affiliation, Azteca América was seen in the market solely through carriage of the network's national feed on Time Warner Cable.

On March 12, 2018, the digital multicast networks Comet and Charge! began broadcasting on digital subchannels 7.3 and 7.4, respectively.

In 2019, KVYE added a fifth digital subchannel, affiliated with Court TV.

On December 31, 2022, Azteca América ceased operations. TV Azteca content in the U.S. thusly moved to Estrella TV, seen in the market on a subchannel of KYMA.

== News operation ==
KVYE presently broadcasts five hours of locally produced newscasts each week (with one hour each weekday); the station does not carry newscasts on Saturdays or Sundays.

The newscast debuted on January 26, 2015.

== Technical information ==
=== Subchannels ===
The station's digital signal is multiplexed:

Subchannels of KVYE
Channel	Res.	Short name	Programming
7.1	1080i	Univisn	Univision
7.3	480i	CometTV	[Blank]
7.4	480i	Charge!	[Blank]
7.5	480i	CourtTV	Court TV
7.6	480i	Majstad	Majestad TV
7.88	1080i	AltaVsn	AltaVision

Subchannel broadcast with MPEG-4 video

=== Analog-to-digital conversion ===
KVYE shut down its analog signal, over VHF channel 7, on June 12, 2009, the official date on which full-power television stations in the United States transitioned from analog to digital broadcasts under federal mandate. The station's digital signal remained on its pre-transition UHF channel 22, using virtual channel 7.
