= WBTE =

- Windsor, North Carolina; United States
- Frequency: 990 kHz

Programming
- Format: Gospel

Ownership
- Owner: Dr. Tine Hicks & Associate

Technical information
- Licensing authority: FCC
- Facility ID: 172
- Class: D
- Power: 1,000 watts day 25 watts night
- Transmitter coordinates: 35°58′0.6″N 76°56′52.8″W
- Translator: (106.3 MHz) W292FY (Windsor)

Links
- Public license information: Public file; LMS

WBTE (990 AM) is a radio station broadcasting a Gospel format. Licensed to Windsor, North Carolina, United States. The station is currently owned by Dr. Tine Hicks & Associate.
