= KORC-LP =

Oregon radio station

KORC-LP 105.9 FM is a low-power community radio station in Corvallis, Oregon, United States. They began operation in 2021 and feature programs centered around music and civics.
