= WBOF-LP =

- Fort Pierce, Florida; United States
- Broadcast area: Treasure Coast
- Frequency: 105.9 MHz
- Branding: WBOF Radio

Programming
- Format: Religious talk and Christian music

Ownership
- Owner: Faith Baptist Church of Fort Pierce, Florida

History
- First air date: 2005; 21 years ago
- Call sign meaning: Beacon of Faith

Technical information
- Licensing authority: FCC
- Facility ID: 134028
- Class: L1
- ERP: 94 watts
- HAAT: 30.7 meters
- Transmitter coordinates: 27°16′29.00″N 80°17′11.00″W

Links
- Public license information: LMS
- Webcast: Listen live
- Website: www.wbofradio.com

WBOF-LP (105.9 FM) is a radio station licensed to Fort Pierce, Florida. The station is owned by Faith Baptist Church of Fort Pierce, Florida.

The station broadcasts Conservative Christian talk programming including talk shows, sermons and a children's show on Saturdays.
