= WKPO =

Radio station in Soldiers Grove–La Crosse, Wisconsin

- Soldiers Grove, Wisconsin; United States
- Broadcast area: Viroqua, Wisconsin/La Crosse, Wisconsin
- Frequency: 105.9 MHz
- Branding: KPO-FM

Programming
- Format: Adult hits

Ownership
- Owner: Robinson Corporation

History
- Founded: February 23, 2005
- First air date: February 20, 2008; 18 years ago
- Former call signs: WKAH (2-9/2008)

Technical information
- Licensing authority: FCC
- Facility ID: 164089
- Class: C3
- ERP: 25,000 watts
- HAAT: 100 meters (330 ft)
- Transmitter coordinates: 43°34′26″N 90°48′55″W

Links
- Public license information: Public file; LMS

WKPO (105.9 FM, "KPO-FM") is a commercial radio station licensed to serve Soldiers Grove, Wisconsin, United States. The station is owned by Robinson Corporation.

WKPO broadcasts an adult hits format.

== History ==
This station received its original construction permit from the Federal Communications Commission on February 23, 2005. The new station was assigned the call sign WKAH by the FCC on February 20, 2008. WKAH received its license to cover from the FCC on March 14, 2008. The station was assigned call sign WKPO by the FCC on September 3, 2008.
