= WCBV-LP =

Radio station in Ohio, United States

- Lima, Ohio; United States
- Broadcast area: Lima area
- Frequency: 105.9 MHz

Programming
- Format: Conservative Christian

Ownership
- Owner: Calvary Bible Church

History
- First air date: June 3, 2003; 22 years ago
- Call sign meaning: "Where Christ Brings Victory"

Technical information
- Licensing authority: FCC
- Facility ID: 131958
- Class: L1
- ERP: 93 watts
- HAAT: 30.8 meters (101 ft)
- Transmitter coordinates: 40°44′14.00″N 84°9′45.00″W

Links
- Public license information: LMS
- Website: cbclima.org/wcbv/

WCBV-LP (105.9 FM) is a radio station licensed to Lima, Ohio, United States; the station serves the Lima area, broadcasting a southern gospel format. The station is currently owned by Calvary Bible Church.

WCBV is a conservative Christian radio station operated by Calvary Bible Church, an independent, fundamental Baptist church. It operates 24 hours daily featuring conservative Christian music, teaching and preaching. The format of the station represents the church which does not use any form of rock music, contemporary Christian music or southern gospel music.
