= KDFJ-LP =

Radio station in Fairbanks, Alaska

Fairbanks, Alaska; United States
- Frequency: 105.9 MHz
- Branding: In Truth Radio 105.9 FM

Programming
- Format: Religious

Ownership
- Owner: Bible Baptist Church of Fairbanks

Technical information
- Licensing authority: FCC
- Facility ID: 195280
- Class: LP1
- ERP: 100 watts
- HAAT: −24 meters (−79 ft)
- Transmitter coordinates: 64°48′49″N 147°45′06″W

Links
- Public license information: LMS
- Website: https://intruthradio.com

KDFJ-LP (105.9 FM) is an FCC licensed low power FM radio station serving Fairbanks, Alaska and parts of North Pole, Alaska. The station is owned and managed by Bible Baptist Church of Fairbanks. It airs a Religious radio format.
