= Ardan Radio =

PM3FHI
Bandung; Indonesia
- Broadcast area: Bandung metropolitan area, some areas of Cianjur, Garut, Sumedang
- Frequency: 105.9 MHz
- Branding: Ardan 105.8 Bandung Hi-Tech FM (1989–2004); 105.9 FM Ardan Radio

Programming
- Language: Indonesian
- Format: Contemporary hit radio

Ownership
- Owner: Ardan Group
- Sister stations: Radio B 95.6 FM, Cakra 90.5 FM

History
- First air date: 14 April 1984 (As Bonk-kenks Radio); 30 April 1989 (as Ardan Radio 105.8 FM); 1 May 1990 (official launch as 105.9 FM Ardan Radio)
- Former call signs: PM3BGB (1977–1989)
- Former frequencies: 234 AM (1984–1989), 105.8 FM (1989–1990)

Links
- Website: http://www.ardanradio.com

PM3FHI (105.9 FM), on air name Ardan Radio, is a radio station in Bandung, Indonesia. This radio station mainly plays contemporary hit music (Top 40). In its promotions, Ardan Radio claims as number 1 radio station in Bandung for young audience target. The station officially went on air as 105.9 FM Ardan Radio on May 1, 1990.

== Jingles ==
The Ardan Radio Bandung Jingles Throughout the History

Jingles as RADIO ARDAN 105.8 FM

- Ardan Hi-Tech FM
- 105,8 Ardan Bandung
- It's Ardan Radio Hi-Tech FM In Flower City
- Everywhere 105,8 Ardan FM
- You're Feeling 105,8 Ardan Hi-Tech FM
- Ardan Swaratama Hi-Tech FM
- Make It More Than Just Music 105,8 Ardan FM
- Have A Nice Weekend With Ardan FM Bandung
- BIRD 105,8 ARDAN HI-TECH FM
- 105,8 Ardan FM
- Ardan Swaratama Bandung
- 105,8 Ardan Swaratama Hi-Tech FM
- Information on Ardan FM (News Update Only)

Jingles as 105.9 FM ARDAN RADIO

- Stay Cool & Lovely 105,9 Ardan FM Bandung
- Stay Cool & Lovely 105,9 Ardan Radio Bandung
- Stay Cool & Lovely, 105,9 Stay Cool & Lovely, Ardan Radio
- 105,9 Ardan Radio
- Ardan FM 105,9 Bandung
- Ardan FM 105,9 Stay Cool & Lovely Station
- Stay Cool & Lovely, 105,9 Ardan FM
