= KLJN =

- Coos Bay, Oregon; United States
- Broadcast area: Coos Bay-North Bend, Oregon
- Frequency: 105.9 MHz
- Branding: 105.9 The Legend

Programming
- Format: Oldies

Ownership
- Owner: Roger Morgan and Jim Deatherage; (Coos Radio Incorporated)

History
- First air date: November 1, 1979 (as KYNG-FM at 105.5)
- Former call signs: KYNG-FM (1979–1992); KYYG-FM (1992); KRSR-FM (1992–1995); KYSG (1995–2001); KYSJ (2001–2018)
- Former frequencies: 105.5 MHz (1979–1985); 106.5 MHz (1985–2001)

Technical information
- Licensing authority: FCC
- Facility ID: 35087
- Class: C2
- ERP: 15,000 watts
- HAAT: 275 meters (902 ft)
- Transmitter coordinates: 43°27′49″N 124°05′44″W

Links
- Public license information: Public file; LMS
- Webcast: Listen Live
- Website: thelegendradio.com

KLJN (105.9 FM) is a radio station licensed to Coos Bay, Oregon, United States. The station is currently owned by Roger Morgan and Jim Deatherage, through licensee Coos Radio Incorporated.

From 2001, the station was branded as "105.9 The Wave" as a smooth jazz format. After a 15-year run, John Hunt bought this station from Lighthouse Radio Group in October 2015 and flipped to an adult alternative format on January 18, 2016 while retaining its current identity. The purchase was consummated on April 1, 2016, at a price of $135,000.

John Hunt, who is also the D.J. for the station in the morning hours, will attempt to break the Guinness World Record for the longest, continuous shift. The record stands at 8 days and 6 hours.

On June 2, 2017, the then-KYSJ went silent.

Effective January 4, 2018, Lighthouse Radio Group re-acquired KYSJ from John Hunt for $5,000. On January 8, 2018, the station returned to the air with an oldies format, branded as "105.9 The Legend". The station changed its call sign to KLJN on January 12, 2018.

Effective April 6, 2018, Lighthouse Radio Group sold KLJN to Coos Radio Incorporation for $100,000.
