= WZED-LP =

- Newport, North Carolina; United States
- Frequency: 105.9 MHz

Ownership
- Owner: Crystal Coast Community Radio

History
- First air date: January 2014

Technical information
- Licensing authority: FCC
- Facility ID: 195306
- Class: L1
- ERP: 0.1 kW
- HAAT: 12.98 m (42.6 ft)
- Transmitter coordinates: 34°44′14.2″N 76°51′15.8″W

Links
- Public license information: LMS

WZED-LP is an FCC-licensed low power FM radio station located in Newport, North Carolina, broadcasting on FM channel 290 (105.9 FM). It was originally operated by the Carteret County public school system.

The station was the idea of Jamie T. Mercer, a middle school teacher of Computer Skills and Applications. Mercer constructed the station and a small production studio in summer 2013 after receiving a construction permit from the FCC. The station began broadcasting in late January 2014. WZED-LP at the time was one of the few student-based and content-driven broadcast stations on the air. Its live station feed was available on its homepage.

A donation agreement was filed to transfer WZED-LP to Crystal Coast Community Radio on October 22, 2020. CCCR operates the station as a community resource providing information on an adult contemporary music format
