= WMMC =

Coordinates: 39°21′09″N 87°49′19″W

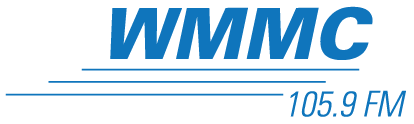
- Marshall, Illinois; United States
- Broadcast area: Terre Haute, Indiana - Charleston, Illinois - Paris, Illinois
- Frequency: 105.9 MHz
- Branding: Magic Hits 105.9

Programming
- Format: Classic hits

Ownership
- Owner: JKO Media Group, LLC.

History
- First air date: October 2, 1989

Technical information
- Licensing authority: FCC
- Facility ID: 28282
- Class: A
- ERP: 2,300 watts
- HAAT: 160.9 meters (528 ft)

Links
- Public license information: Public file; LMS
- Webcast: Listen live
- Website: wmmc1059.com

WMMC 105.9 FM is a radio station broadcasting a classic hits format. Licensed to Marshall, Illinois, the station serves Terre Haute, Indiana, Charleston, Illinois and Paris, Illinois areas. The station is owned by JKO Media Group, LLC.

== History ==
The station began broadcasting October 2, 1989, and aired an oldies format. In 1992, the station was taken silent. In 1995, the station resumed broadcasting, airing an adult contemporary format. By 2011, the station was airing a classic hits format.
