= DZCA-FM =

DZCA
Legazpi; Philippines
- Broadcast area: Legazpi and surrounding areas
- Frequency: 105.9 MHz

Programming
- Format: Silent

Ownership
- Owner: Computer Arts and Technological College

History
- First air date: 1999
- Last air date: 2018
- Former names: CA FM (1999–2012); CAT College Radio (2013–2018)
- Call sign meaning: Computer Arts

Technical information
- Licensing authority: NTC

Links
- Website: Facebook Page

DZCA (105.9 FM) was a radio station owned and operated by the Computer Arts and Technological College. Its studios were located at the CATC Bldg., Balintawak St., Legazpi.
