= WVAO-LP =

- Athol, Massachusetts; United States
- Broadcast area: Athol/Orange
- Frequency: 105.9 MHz
- Branding: WVAO 105.9 FM

Programming
- Format: Community radio

Ownership
- Owner: Athol Orange Community Television, Inc.

History
- First air date: August 20, 2015
- Call sign meaning: "Voice of Athol Orange"

Technical information
- Licensing authority: FCC
- Facility ID: 191917
- Class: L1
- ERP: 59 watts
- HAAT: 39.6 meters (130 ft)
- Transmitter coordinates: 42°34′23.50″N 72°13′36.40″W

Links
- Public license information: LMS
- Website: www.aotv13.org/wvao-lp/

WVAO-LP (105.9 FM) is a community radio station licensed to Athol, Massachusetts and serves the Athol/Orange area. Its broadcast license is held by Athol Orange Community Television, Inc.

== History ==
This station received its original construction permit from the Federal Communications Commission on February 19, 2014. The new station was assigned the WVAO-LP call sign by the FCC on February 26, 2014. The station received its license to cover from the FCC on July 27, 2015. It signed on August 20, 2015. The station primarily broadcasts local information and the audio of Athol Orange Community Television programming; when local programming is not being aired, the station carries radio reading service programming from the Talking Information Center in Marshfield.

== See also ==
- List of community radio stations in the United States
