= XHOE-FM =

Radio station in Querétaro, Querétaro, Mexico

- Querétaro, Querétaro; Mexico
- Frequency: 95.5 MHz
- Branding: Exa FM

Programming
- Format: Spanish & English Top 40 (CHR)
- Affiliations: MVS Radio

Ownership
- Owner: Corporación Multimundo; (Estéreo Mundo de Querétaro, S.A.)
- Sister stations: XHXE-FM

History
- First air date: June 1, 1980

Technical information
- Class: B
- ERP: 50,000 watts
- HAAT: 56.5 meters
- Transmitter coordinates: 20°38′12.9″N 100°24′36.54″W

Links
- Webcast: Listen live
- Website: exafm.com

XHOE-FM is a radio station on 95.5 FM in Querétaro, Querétaro, Mexico. It carries the national Exa FM format from MVS Radio and is owned by Corporación Multimundo.

== History ==
XHOE hit the air on June 1, 1980, the first commercial FM station in the state of Querétaro. It was known as Estéreo Mundo, a name still reflected in the concessionaire of this station, and owned by the Desarrollo Radiofónico group. In 1993, Desarrollo changed its name to Multimundo, and in the mid-90s, XHOE changed its name to Planeta. In March 2004, Planeta flipped the station to pop as Kiss FM.

In 2007, all of Multimundo's remaining stations, located in Querétaro, San Miguel de Allende and Torreón, were sold to Grupo Imagen, except for XHOE. On July 1, 2008, the station adopted the Exa FM pop format from MVS Radio, previously on XHOZ-FM 94.7.
