= KUKA (FM) =

Radio station in San Diego, Texas

Coordinates: 27.6713°N 97.7382°W

- Driscoll, Texas; United States
- Broadcast area: Alice, Texas; Kingsville, Texas
- Frequency: 105.9 MHz
- Branding: Retro Country 105.9/103.3

Programming
- Format: Classic country

Ownership
- Owner: Claro Communications, Ltd.

History
- First air date: July 14, 1993

Technical information
- Licensing authority: FCC
- Facility ID: 2818
- Class: C3
- ERP: 10,000 watts
- HAAT: 126 meters (413 ft)
- Translator: 103.3 K277BL (Corpus Christi)

Links
- Public license information: Public file; LMS

KUKA (105.9 FM) is a radio station licensed to Driscoll, Texas. The station broadcasts a classic country music format and is owned by Claro Communications, Ltd.

On April 24, 2024, KUKA changed their format from country to classic country, branded as "Retro Country 105.9/103.3" (simulcast on FM translator K277BL 103.3 FM Corpus Christi).
