= KROZ-LP =

- Hobbs, New Mexico; United States
- Frequency: 105.9 MHz
- Branding: The Cross

Programming
- Format: Religious radio
- Affiliations: USA Radio Network

Ownership
- Owner: First Bi-Lingual Christian Ministerial Association

Technical information
- Licensing authority: FCC
- Facility ID: 133891
- Class: L1
- ERP: 100 watts
- HAAT: 24.8 meters (81 ft)
- Transmitter coordinates: 32°42′48″N 103°8′59″W

Links
- Public license information: LMS

KROZ-LP (105.9 FM, The Cross) is a radio station broadcasting a religious radio format, licensed to Hobbs, New Mexico, United States. The station is currently owned by First Bi-Lingual Christian Ministerial Association and features programming from USA Radio Network.
