= KRAZ =

Coordinates: 34.525528°N 119.959028°W

- Santa Ynez, California; United States
- Broadcast area: Santa Barbara County, California
- Frequency: 105.9 MHz
- Branding: KRAZY Country 105.9

Programming
- Format: Country
- Affiliations: Westwood One

Ownership
- Owner: Santa Ynez Valley Media Inc..

History
- First air date: 2001
- Former call signs: KAGA (1993–1997)
- Call sign meaning: KRAZy Country

Technical information
- Licensing authority: FCC
- Facility ID: 33439
- Class: A
- ERP: 65 watts
- HAAT: 894 meters (2,933 ft)

Links
- Public license information: Public file; LMS
- Webcast: Listen Live
- Website: krazfm.com

KRAZ (105.9 FM, "KRAZy Country 105.9") is a commercial radio station that is licensed to Santa Ynez, California and serves the Santa Ynez and Santa Barbara areas. The station is owned by Santa Ynez Valley Media Inc.. and broadcasts a country music format from its studios in Santa Ynez.

== History ==
The station at 105.9 FM originated in a Federal Communications Commission (FCC) construction permit (CP) issued in 1993 with the call sign KAGA. Original owner Karin Wood sold the CP to Grape Radio Inc., owned by Mary Constant, for $45,000 in April 1995. The call letters were changed to KRAZ on March 31, 1997. In early 2001, Grape Radio sold KRAZ to Knight Broadcasting Inc., headed by Sandra Knight, for $325,000. The station finally signed on later that year with a country music format.

Syndicated programming on KRAZ includes CMT Country Countdown USA on Saturday mornings.
