= KSEH =

Coordinates: 32.911°N 115.529°W

- Brawley, California; United States
- Broadcast area: Imperial Valley, California; Mexicali, Baja California
- Frequency: 94.5 MHz
- Branding: La Suavecita 94.5

Programming
- Language: Spanish
- Format: Soft adult contemporary

Ownership
- Owner: Entravision Communications; (Entravision Holdings, LLC)
- Sister stations: KMXX; TV stations: KVYE, KAJB

History
- First air date: 1988
- Former call signs: KHYT (1987); KWES (1988–1990); KWST (1990–2001)

Technical information
- Licensing authority: FCC
- Class: B
- ERP: 50,000 watts
- HAAT: 92 meters (302 ft)

Links
- Public license information: Public file; LMS
- Webcast: Listen Live
- Website: radiolasauvecita.com/el-centro/

KSEH (94.5 FM) is a Spanish-language soft AC radio station branded as La Suavecita 94.5. It is owned by Entravision Communications and broadcasts a 50,000 watt signal to the Imperial Valley, California and Mexicali, Baja California areas. The city of license is Brawley, California.

== History ==
This station received its construction permit in 1987, and began program testing in 1988. The station was given the callsign KHYT during construction. It signed on with a country format with the call sign KWES and branded "K-West" in the summer of 1988; it would only adopt the call sign "KWST" in 1990 when the famous L.A. based station KWST ceased operations and became KPWR.

This station was formed by Brawley Broadcasting Company, a local broadcaster. In 1998, it was announced that the station was put up for sale. It was acquired by Entravision later that year, with the sale being consummated on September 28. In 2001, KWST changed languages, its call sign became KSEH, and it became a full-time Spanish-language outlet. For a number of years prior to 2018, it was an adult hits station branded as Jose 94.5, In January 2018, the station flipped to a soft AC format as La Suavecita, roughly translated as "the little soft one". Its music is softer, workplace-grade and sometimes down-tempo compared to other Latin pop stations in the area.
