= KQPM =

Coordinates: 39.130°N 123.077°W

- Ukiah, California; United States
- Frequency: 105.9 MHz
- Branding: Q106

Programming
- Format: Country

Ownership
- Owner: Bicoastal Media Licenses, LLC

Technical information
- Licensing authority: FCC
- Facility ID: 65249
- Class: B
- ERP: 1,900 watts
- HAAT: 615 meters (2,018 feet)

Links
- Public license information: Public file; LMS
- Webcast: Listen Live
- Website: www.kqpm.com

KQPM is a radio station broadcasting a country music format in Ukiah, California.
