= KCNL (FM) =

- Quartzsite, Arizona; United States
- Frequency: 105.9 MHz
- Branding: Q105.9 FM

Programming
- Format: Classic rock

Ownership
- Owner: Marvin Vosper Estate; (Dennis Vosper, Personal Representative for the Marvin Vosper Estate)

History
- First air date: 2016

Technical information
- Licensing authority: FCC
- Facility ID: 191555
- Class: C3
- ERP: 390 watts
- HAAT: 680 metres (2,230 ft)
- Transmitter coordinates: 33°34′12″N 114°20′59″W

Links
- Public license information: Public file; LMS

KCNL (105.9 FM, "Q105.9 FM") is a radio station licensed to serve the community of Quartzsite, Arizona. The station is owned by the Marvin Vosper Estate, through licensee Dennis Vosper, Personal Representative for the Marvin Vosper Estate, and airs a classic rock format. It's an affiliate of the syndicated Pink Floyd program "Floydian Slip."

The station was assigned the KCNL call letters by the Federal Communications Commission on August 30, 2013.
