= XHOZ-FM (Querétaro) =

Imagen Radio station in Querétaro

- Querétaro, Querétaro; Mexico
- Frequency: 94.7 MHz
- Branding: Imagen Radio

Programming
- Format: News/talk

Ownership
- Owner: Grupo Imagen; (GIM Televisión Nacional, S.A. de C.V.)

History
- First air date: 1982

Technical information
- Class: C1
- ERP: 100,000 watts
- HAAT: 45.72 meters (150.0 ft)
- Transmitter coordinates: 20°31′43.9″N 100°21′39.2″W

Links
- Website: imagenqueretaro.mx

XHOZ-FM is a radio station in Querétaro, Querétaro. Broadcasting on 94.7 FM, XHOZ is owned by Grupo Imagen and carries its Imagen Radio network. The transmitter is located atop a tower in Cerro El Cimatario south of the city center.

== History ==
The concession was issued to René Olivares Gascón in 1982. It was sold to Impulsora de Radiodifusión, S.A., and then to Imagen.
