= List of radio stations in Baja California =

This is a list of the CRT-licensed radio stations in Baja California, Mexico which can be sorted by their call signs, frequencies, location, ownership, names, and programming formats. Pirate radio stations have not been included in the list.

Radio stations in Baja California
Call sign	Frequency	Location	Owner	Name	Format
XESURF-AM	540 AM	Tijuana	Radio RYS, S.A. de C.V.	Radio Zion	Christian
XESS-AM	620 AM	Puerto Nuevo	Media Sports de México, S.A. de C.V.	PSN Radio Tecate	Talk
XEWW-AM	690 AM	Rosarito	Media Sports de México, S.A. de C.V.	La Gigante	News/Talk
XESU-AM (Note: Linked to XHSU-FM, which must keep XESU-AM on the air until there are no listeners in its service area unserved by other radio stations.)	790 AM	Mexicali	XESU, S.A. de C.V.	La Dinámica	Regional Mexican
XESPN-AM	800 AM	Tijuana	Mario Enrique Mayans Camacho	Norte	Spanish adult hits
XEABCA-AM (Note: Linked to XHABCA-FM, which must keep XEABCA-AM on the air until there are no listeners in its service area unserved by other radio stations.)	820 AM	Mexicali	Radio Cañón, S.A. de C.V.	La Ke Buena	Regional Mexican
XEZF-AM	850 AM	Mexicali	XEZF-AM, S.A.	Buenisiima	Regional Mexican
XEMO-AM	860 AM	Rancho Vista Hermosa, Tijuana	Radiodifusora X.E.M.O., S.A. de C.V.	La Poderosa	Spanish Adult Hits
XEAO-AM	910 AM	Mexicali	La Voz de Mexicali, S.A.	Radio Mexicana	Regional Mexican
XEMMM-AM	940 AM	Mexicali	Radio Cañón, S.A. de C.V.	W Radio	News/Talk
XEKAM-AM	950 AM	Tijuana	Transmisora Regional Radio Fórmula, S.A. de C.V.	Radio Fórmula	News/talk
XECL-AM	990 AM	Mexicali	XECL-AM, S.A. de C.V.	Rocola	Oldies
XECSAH-AM	1010 AM	Ensenada	Instituto Michoacano de Radiodifusión, A.C.	—N/a	—N/a
XESDD-AM	1030 AM	Tijuana	Media Sports de México, S.A. de C.V.	La Tremenda	News/talk
XED-AM	1050 AM	Mexicali	XED, S.A. de C.V.	La Gran D	Regional Mexican
XEPRS-AM	1090 AM	Rancho del Mar, Playas de Rosarito Municipality	Interamericana de Radio, S.A. de C.V.	La Voz	Christian
XEMX-AM	1120 AM	Mexicali	Stereorey México, S.A.	Noticias MVS	News/talk
XERM-AM	1150 AM	Mexicali	Media Sports de México, S.A. de C.V.	Radio Mexicali	News/talk
XEQIN-AM	1160 AM	San Quintín	Instituto Nacional de los Pueblos Indígenas	La Voz del Valle (with XHSQB-FM 95.1)	Indigenous
XEMBC-AM	1190 AM	Mexicali	Mario Enrique Mayans Camacho	Estéreo Baja	Pop Rock
XEAZ-AM	1270 AM	Tijuana	Media Sports de México, S.A. de C.V.	La Romántica	Romantic
XEC-AM	1310 AM	Tijuana	Gloria Herminia Enciso Power; Gloria Herminia, Maricel, José Enrique, Marcia, Claudia Beatriz and Laura Elena Jiménez Enciso	Radio Enciso	News/talk
XEAA-AM	1340 AM	Mexicali	Grupo Radiodigital Siglo XXI, S.A. de C.V.	—N/a	—N/a
XECSAF-AM	1350 AM	San Quintín	Instituto Michoacano de Radiodifusión, A.C.	—N/a	—N/a
XEHG-AM	1370 AM	Mexicali	X-E-H-G, S.A.	Vida	Spanish Adult Hits
XEXX-AM	1420 AM	Tijuana	Operadora de Radio y Televisión, S.A.	Radio Ranchito	Regional Mexican
XEHC-AM	1470 AM	Tijuana	Broadcasting Baja California, S.A. de C.V.	Rasa	Spanish and English Oldies
XEBG-AM	1550 AM	Tijuana	Mario Enrique Mayans Camacho	Estéreo Baja	Pop/Rock
XECPTB-AM	1630 AM	Tijuana	Universidad Autónoma de Baja California	UABC Radio	University
XEPE-AM	1700 AM	Tijuana	Media Sports de México, S.A. de C.V.	TUDN Radio	Sports
XHKT-FM	88.5 FM	Tecate	Radio Cuchuma, S.A.	La Super KT	
XHITT-FM	88.7 FM	Tijuana	Patronato Pro-Estación Cultural del Instituto Tecnológico de Tijuana X.H.I.T.T., A.C.	Radio Tecnológico	University
XHEPF-FM	89.1 FM	Ensenada	Gloria Herminia Enciso Power; Gloria Herminia, Maricel, José Enrique, Marcia, Claudia Beatriz and Laura Elena Jiménez Enciso	La Rancherita	Regional Mexican
XHCSAO-FM	89.1 FM	San Felipe	Voz de Transformación, A.C.	—N/a	—N/a
XHSOL-FM	89.9 FM	Mexicali	Frecuencias Especiales, S.A.	Súper	Contemporary hit radio
XHITZ-FM	90.3 FM	Tijuana	Comunicación XERSA, S.A. de C.V.	Z90.3	Contemporary hit radio
XHMOE-FM	90.7 FM	Mexicali	Radiotelevisora de Mexicali, S.A. de C.V.	Los 40	Contemporary hit radio
XHTIM-FM	90.7 FM	Tijuana	Stereorey México, S.A.	La Mejor	Regional Mexican
XETRA-FM	91.1 FM	Tijuana	Comunicación XERSA, S.A. de C.V.	91X	Classic alternative rock
XHJC-FM	91.5 FM	Mexicali	Stereorey México, S.A.	Exa FM	Contemporary hit radio
XHGLX-FM	91.7 FM	Tijuana	Stereorey México, S.A.	Exa FM	Contemporary hit radio
XHHC-FM	92.1 FM	Ensenada	Radio Informativa, S.A. de C.V.	La Caliente	Regional Mexican
XHMMF-FM	92.3 FM	Mexicali	Efemmex, S.A. de C.V.	La Bestia Grupera	Regional Mexican
XHRM-FM	92.5 FM	Tijuana	Comunicación XERSA, S.A. de C.V.	Magic	Rhythmic adult contemporary
XHFZO-FM	92.9 FM	Ensenada	Grupo Uzivra, S.A. de C.V.	Amor Mío	Romantic
XHSFP-FM	93.9 FM	San Felipe	Humberto Aréchiga Espinoza	PSN Radio	News/talk
XHA-FM	94.5 FM	Tijuana	Broadcasting Baja California, S.A. de C.V.	La Invasora	Regional Mexican
XHPENS-FM	94.7 FM	Ensenada	Radio Informativa, S.A. de C.V.	La Lupe	Spanish adult hits
XHSQB-FM	95.1 FM	San Quintín	Instituto Nacional de los Pueblos Indígenas	La Voz del Valle (with XEQIN-AM 1160)	Indigenous
XHHIT-FM	95.3 FM	Tecate	Radio Triunfos, S.A. de C.V.	La Lupe	Spanish adult hits
XHUAC-FM	95.5 FM	Ensenada	Universidad Autónoma de Baja California	UABC Radio	University
XHPSEN-FM	96.9 FM	Ensenada	Cadena Radiópolis, S.A. de C.V.	Los 40	Contemporary hit radio
XHMUG-FM	96.9 FM	Mexicali	Radio y Televisión Internacional, S.A. de C.V.	La Poderosa	Spanish Adult Hits
XHEBC-FM	97.9 FM	Ensenada	EBC Radio, S.A. de C.V.	Play FM	Contemporary hit radio
XHMIX-FM	98.3 FM	La Rumorosa	Sistemas de Comunicación Bajacaliforniana, S.A. de C.V.	Power 98	Contemporary hit radio
XHBAJA-FM	98.3 FM	San Quintín	Fundación San Quintín, A.C.	La Chula	Regional Mexican
XHPEDV-FM	98.7 FM	Rodolfo Sánchez Taboada	Fundación de la Radio Social de Baja California, A.C.	La Chula	Regional Mexican
XHMORE-FM	98.9 FM	Tijuana	Mario Enrique Mayans Camacho	Party Mix	Spanish urban
XHOCL-FM	99.3 FM	Tijuana	Frecuencia Modulada del Noroeste, S.A.	Globo	Spanish adult contemporary
XHTY-FM	99.7 FM	Tijuana	Tijuana FM, S.A. de C.V.	La Invasora	Regional Mexican
XHDX-FM	100.3 FM	Ensenada	Mario Enrique Mayans Camacho	La Calurosa	Regional Mexican
XHAT-FM	101.1 FM	Ensenada	XHAT, S.A. de C.V.	Estéreo Sol	Classic Hits
XHABCA-FM	101.3 FM	Mexicali	Radio Cañón, S.A. de C.V.	La Ke Buena	Regional Mexican
XHARB-FM	101.9 FM	Ensenada	Fundación Cultural para la Sociedad Mexicana	Radio María	Catholic
XHPF-FM	101.9 FM	Mexicali	Stereorey México, S.A. de C.V.	Globo	Romantic
XHCPDJ-FM (Note: To become XHCPDJ-FM in 2023)	102.5 FM	Tijuana	Instituto Mexicano de la Radio	Fusión	Jazz
XHENA-FM	103.3 FM	Ensenada	Stereorey México, S.A. de C.V.	La Mejor	Regional Mexican
XHVG-FM	103.3 FM	Mexicali	Stereorey México, S.A. de C.V.	La Mejor	Regional Mexican
XHADA-FM	104.1 FM	Ensenada	Stereorey México, S.A. de C.V.	Exa FM	Contemporary hit radio
XHBA-FM	104.1 FM	Mexicali	Universidad Autónoma de Baja California	UABC Radio	University
XHLTN-FM	104.5 FM	Tijuana	GIM Televisión Nacional, S.A. de C.V.	Radio Latina	Spanish adult contemporary
XHMC-FM	104.9 FM	Mexicali	Radiodifusora XHMC, S.A. de C.V.	La Invasora	Regional Mexican
XHLNC-FM	104.9 FM	Tijuana	Martha Margarita Barba de la Torre	La Número Uno	Regional Mexican
XHCMS-FM	105.5 FM	Mexicali	GIM Televisión Nacional, S.A. de C.V.	Imagen Radio	News/talk
XHPRS-FM	105.7 FM	Tecate	Media Sports de México, S.A. de C.V.	Suave	AC Spanish
XHSU-FM	105.9 FM	Mexicali	XESU, S.A. de C.V.	La Dinámica	Regional Mexican
XEWV-FM	106.7 FM	Mexicali	Mario Enrique Mayans Camacho	Party Mix	Spanish urban
XHDY-FM	107.1 FM	Ciudad Morelos	Radio y Producción de Calidad, S.A. de C.V.	Radio Ranchito	Regional Mexican
XHFG-FM	107.3 FM	Tijuana	Radiodifusora XHFG, S.A. de C.V.	Pulsar	Contemporary hit radio
XHRST-FM	107.7 FM	Tijuana	Radio XHRST-FM, S.A. de C.V.	El Sol	Regional Mexican
XHSCBH-FM	107.9 FM	Ensenada	Grupo Radioasta, A.C.	Grupo Radioasta	Community radio
