= XHABCJ-FM =

Radio station in Guadalajara, Jalisco

Simulcast with XEAV-AM 580
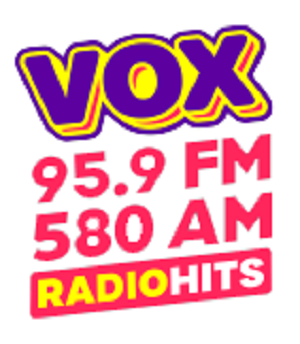
- San Pedro Tlaquepaque, Jalisco; Mexico
- Frequency: 95.9 MHz (HD Radio)
- Branding: Vox Radio Hits

Programming
- Format: Adult Contemporary
- Affiliations: Radiopolis

Ownership
- Owner: Radio Cañón; (México Radio, S.A. de C.V.)
- Sister stations: XEAV-AM, XEHL-AM, XEBA-AM

History
- First air date: November 25, 1980; 45 years ago (concession); July 1, 2019; 7 years ago (FM)
- Former call signs: XECCC-AM (1980–April 19, 2005); XEABCJ-AM (2005–2020)
- Former frequencies: 1440 kHz (1980–2020)
- Call sign meaning: "ABC Radio Jalisco"

Technical information
- Licensing authority: CRT
- Class: A
- ERP: 2 kW
- HAAT: 101.5 meters (333 ft)
- Transmitter coordinates: 20°36′46.8″N 103°17′55.2″W

Links
- Webcast: Listen live
- Website: grupo-rc.mx

XHABCJ-FM is a radio station on 95.9 FM in Guadalajara, Jalisco, Mexico. It is owned by Radio Cañón and carries the Vox Radio Hits adult contemporary format from Radiópolis.

== History ==
XECCC-AM received its concession on November 25, 1980. It was owned by Sara Cabañas Rodríguez and joined the Promomedios family of "triple" callsign stations alongside XEAAA-AM 880 and XEBBB-AM 1040. XECCC cycled through many names and formats in its history.

In 2001, it carried the very short-lived Red W Interactiva talk network, which lasted three months. In 2003, it flipped to sports as Estadio 1440.

In 2005, XECCC was sold to OEM and changed its callsign to XEABCJ-AM. The concession transferred in 2010. As part of the sale, XEABCJ moved to XEAV's tower. After just one year with ABC Radio's talk programs, XEABCJ flipped to romantic as Corazón (2006–2008), tropical as La Estrella del Caribe (2008–14), grupera as La Feroz (2014) and lastly ABC Radio 1440 with romantic music.

In 2017, XEABCJ was authorized to migrate to FM as XHABCJ-FM. It began testing on the new frequency in May 2019.

In late June, the station began broadcasting test programming with a rock format. On July 1, 2019, the station formally launched as Rock 101, an extension of the Rock 101 online station created by Luis Gerardo Salas in 2016 (and patterned after the original Rock 101 in Mexico City) and the Rock 101 show already being distributed by ABC Radio. A year later, as required by the Federal Telecommunications Institute, the AM station signed off.

Rock 101 Guadalajara ended on November 30, 2021, and the station began primarily simulcasting XEAV-AM 580 "Canal 58", the other ABC station in Guadalajara, the next day.

On April 24, 2023, as part of a national alliance between the company and Radiópolis, 22 NTR-owned stations adopted franchise formats from Radiópolis. With Ke Buena, Los 40, and W Radio already represented in Guadalajara, XHABCJ adopted the company's Spanish adult contemporary format, Vox Radio Hits.
