= XEABC-AM =

Radio station in Mexico City

- Mexico City; Mexico
- Broadcast area: Greater Mexico City
- Frequency: 760 kHz
- Branding: Vox

Programming
- Format: Adult contemporary
- Affiliations: Radiópolis

Ownership
- Owner: Grupo Radio Cañón; (Radio Cañón, S.A. de C.V.)
- Sister stations: XEL-AM

History
- First air date: August 20, 1964 (concession)
- Call sign meaning: "ABC Radio"

Technical information
- Licensing authority: CRT
- Class: B
- Power: 100 kW day 10 kW night

Links
- Webcast: Listen live
- Website: grupo-rc.mx

XEABC-AM is a radio station in Mexico City, licensed to San Sebastián Chimalpa in the State of Mexico. Broadcasting on 760 kHz, XEABC is owned by Radio Cañón, S.A. de C.V., concessionaire for the Estudios Tepeyac division of Radio Cañon, and broadcasts an Adult Contemporary format as "Vox".

== History ==
XEABC signed on August 20, 1964, and adopted the "ABC Radio" name in the 1970s. For many years, the station's logo was the same as the logo of the American Broadcasting Company, despite never having any relation to it.

ABC Radio relied on the resources of Organización Editorial Mexicana newspapers, which are co-owned with Estudios Tepeyac and XEABC.

XEABC provided programming to 24 radio stations across Mexico. Of these, two carry similar callsigns: XEABCJ-AM 1440 in Guadalajara and XEABCA-AM 820 in Mexicali.

In April 2021, NTR acquired the ABC Radio network from OEM. XEABC was rebranded as "760 AM", until August 15, 2022 when it adopted the name "Radio Cañón", name used on old ABC Radio stations, based on XHTGO-FM.

On January 5, 2026, the station adopted the "Vox Radio Hits" format from Radiópolis, featuring contemporary Spanish and English music from the 90s, 2000s and 2010s, while retaining the NTR news programs.
