= 760 AM =

AM radio frequency

The following radio stations broadcast on AM frequency 760 kHz: WJR in Detroit, Michigan, is the only class A station in North America broadcasting on 760 AM; 760 AM is a U.S. clear-channel frequency.

== In Argentina ==
- LU6 Atlántica in Mar del Plata, Buenos Aires

== In Canada ==
- CFLD in Burns Lake, British Columbia - 1 kW, transmitter located at 54.2553°N 125.758°W

== In Chile ==
- CB-76 Radio Colo Colo in Santiago, Metropolitan Region

== In Mexico ==
- XEABC-AM in San Sebastián Chimal, State of Mexico
- XEDGO-AM in Durango, Durango
- XEEB-AM in Ciudad Obregón, Sonora
- XENY-AM in Nogales, Sonora
- XERA-AM in San Cristóbal de Las Casas, Chiapas
- XEZZ-AM in Guadalajara, Jalisco

== In the United States ==
Stations in bold are clear-channel stations.

Call sign	City of license	Facility ID	Classes	Daytime power (kW)	Nighttime power (kW)	Critical hours power (kW)	Unlimited power (kW)	Transmitter coordinates
KCCV	Overland Park, Kansas	6491	D	6	0.2			39.040556°N 94.509444°W
KDFD	Thornton, Colorado	29740	B	50	1			40.009167°N 104.939167°W
KGB	San Diego, California	42120	B	5	50			32.8425°N 117.025°W
KGU	Honolulu, Hawaii	53705	B				10	21.294722°N 157.863611°W
KMTL	Sherwood, Arkansas	23871	D	10				34.826111°N 92.205278°W
KTKR	San Antonio, Texas	11945	B	50	1			29.449444°N 98.309167°W
WCHP	Champlain, New York	10130	D	35	0.011			44.945556°N 73.43°W
WCIS	Morganton, North Carolina	70623	D	3.5				35.794444°N 81.72°W
WCPS	Tarboro, North Carolina	14004	D	1				35.928889°N 77.570278°W
WEFL	Tequesta, Florida	35148	B	3	1.5			26.995278°N 80.192778°W
WENO	Nashville, Tennessee	71507	D	1				36.141111°N 86.756389°W
WETR	Knoxville, Tennessee	65205	D	2.4				35.988333°N 83.843056°W
**WJR**	Detroit, Michigan	8626	A				50	42.168056°N 83.215°W
WLCC	Brandon, Florida	71212	B	10	1			28.024722°N 82.283889°W
WORA	Mayaguez, Puerto Rico	54480	B				5	18.191667°N 67.157778°W
WURL	Moody, Alabama	65459	D	1				33.586944°N 86.471667°W
WVNE	Leicester, Massachusetts	5890	D	25		8.6		42.249167°N 72.078056°W
