= Squad number (association football) =

Typical jersey number and their field position correlation in association football

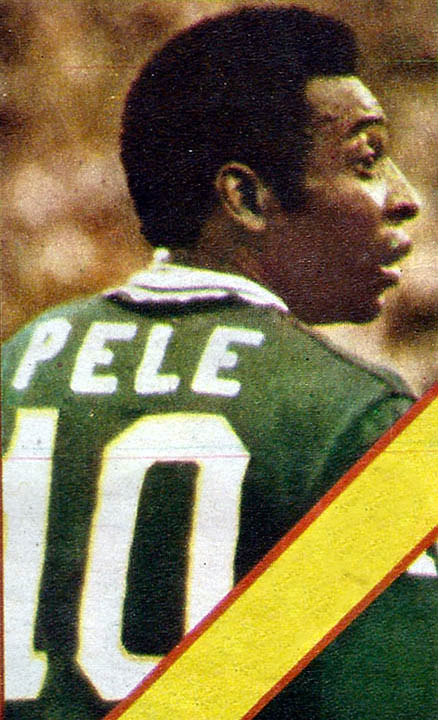
Pelé during his tenure on the New York Cosmos wearing his iconic #10

Squad numbers are used in association football to identify and distinguish players who are on the field. Numbers very soon became a way to also indicate position, with starting players being assigned numbers 1–11. However, there is no fixed rule; numbers may be assigned to indicate position, alphabetically by name, according to a player's whim, randomly, or in any other way. In the modern game they are often influenced by the players' favourite numbers and other less technical reasons, as well as using "surrogates" for a number that is already in use. However, numbers 1–11 are often still worn by players of the previously associated position.

As national leagues adopted squad numbers and game tactics evolved over the decades, numbering systems evolved separately in each football scene, and so different countries have different conventions. Still, there are some numbers that are universally agreed upon being used for a particular position, because they are quintessentially associated with that role.

For instance, "1" is frequently used by the starting goalkeeper, as the goalkeeper is the first player in a line-up. "9" is usually worn by strikers, also known as centre-forwards, who hold the most advanced offensive position on the pitch, and are often the highest scorers in the team. "10" is one of the most emblematic squad numbers in football, due to the sheer number of football legends that have worn the number 10 shirt; forwards, playmakers, second strikers, and attacking midfielders have worn this number.

== History ==
=== First use of numbers ===
The first record of numbered jerseys in football date back to 1911, with Australian teams Sydney Leichhardt and HMS Powerful being the first to use squad numbers on their backs. One year later, numbering in football would be ruled as mandatory in New South Wales.

The next recorded use was on 23 March 1914 when the English Wanderers, a team of amateur players from Football League clubs, played Corinthians at Stamford Bridge, London. This was Corinthians' first match after their FA ban for joining the Amateur Football Association was rescinded. Wanderers won 4–2.

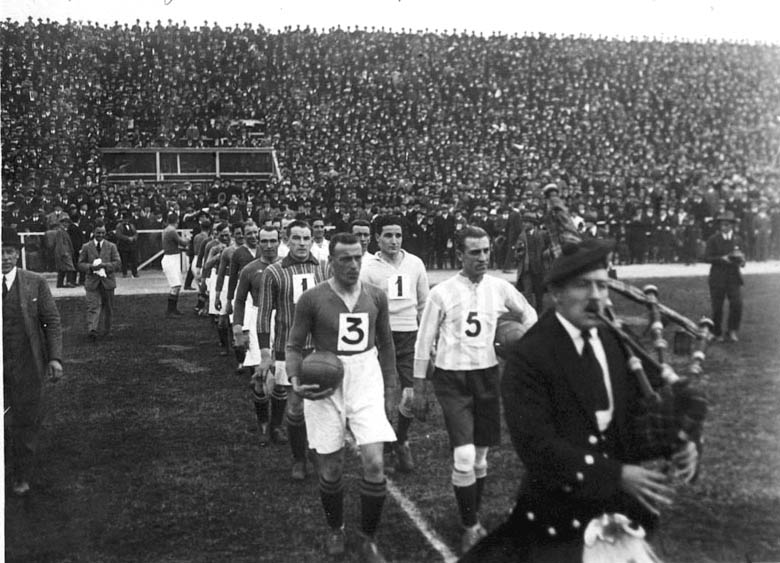
First use of numbers in South America: Third Lanark and Argentine "Zona Norte" combined entering to the pitch with numbered jerseys, 10 June 1923

In South America, Argentina was the first country with numbered shirts. It was during the Scottish team Third Lanark tour to South America of 1923, they played a friendly match v a local combined team ("Zona Norte") on 10 June. Both squads were numbered from 1–11.

In the United States, the first football match with squad numbers was played on 30 March 1924 when the Fall River F.C. played St. Louis Vesper Buick during the 1923–24 National Challenge Cup. Only the local team wore numbered shirts.

The next recorded use in association football in Europe was on 25 August 1928 when The Wednesday played Arsenal and Chelsea hosted Swansea Town at Stamford Bridge. Numbers were assigned by field location:

1. Goalkeeper
2. Right full back (right side centre back)
3. Left full back (left side centre back)
4. Right half back (right side defensive midfield)
5. Centre half back (centre defensive midfield)
6. Left half back (left side defensive midfield)
7. Outside right (right winger)
8. Inside right (attacking midfield)
9. Centre forward
10. Inside left (attacking midfield)
11. Outside left (left winger)

In the first game at Stamford Bridge, only the outfield players wore numbers (2–11). The Daily Express (p. 13, 27 August 1928) reported, "The 35,000 spectators were able to give credit for each bit of good work to the correct individual, because the team were numbered, and the large figures in black on white squares enabled each man to be identified without trouble." The Daily Mirror ("Numbered Jerseys A Success", p. 29, 27 August 1928) also covered the match: "I fancy the scheme has come to stay. All that was required was a lead and London has supplied it." When Chelsea toured Argentina, Uruguay and Brazil at the end of the season in the summer of 1929, they also wore numbered shirts, earning the nickname "Los Numerados" ("the numbered") from locals.

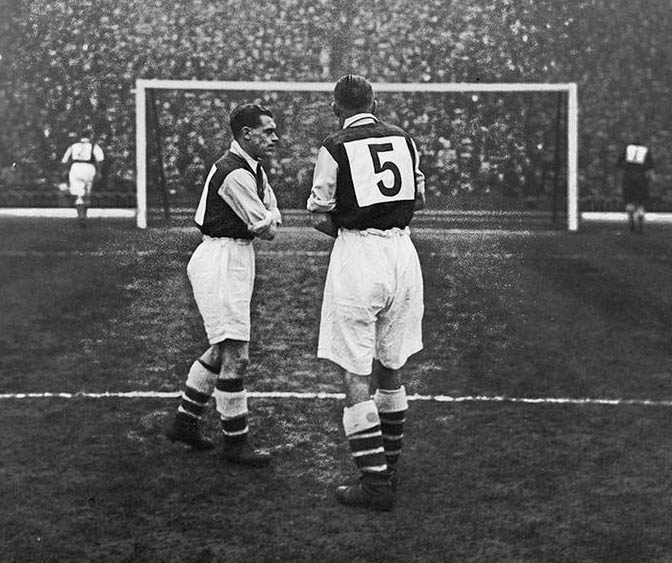
Arsenal FC wearing numbered shirts in a friendly v FC Vienna in 1933. Numbered shirts had first appeared in England in 1928 when Arsenal played Sheffield Wednesday. Their use would not be ruled mandatory until 1939

A similar numbering criterion was used in the 1933 FA Cup Final between Everton and Manchester City. Nevertheless, it was not until the 1939–40 season when The Football League ruled that squads had to wear numbers for each player.

Early evolutions of formations involved moving specific positions; for example, moving the centre half back to become a defender rather than a half back. Their numbers went with them, hence central defenders wearing number 5, and remnants of the system remain. For example, in friendly and championship qualifying matches England, when playing the 4–4–2 formation, generally number their players (using the standard right to left system of listing football teams) four defenders – 2, 5, 6, 3; four midfielders – 7, 4, 8, 11; two forwards – 10, 9. This system of numbering can also be adapted to a midfield diamond with the holding midfielder wearing 4 and the attacking central midfielder wearing 8. Similarly, the Swedish national team number their players: four defenders – 2, 3, 4, 5; four midfielders – 7, 6, 8, 9; two forwards – 10, 11.

The 1950 FIFA World Cup was the first FIFA competition to see squad numbers for each players, but persistent numbers would not be issued until the 1954 World Cup, where each man in a country's 22-man squad wore a specific number from 1 to 22 for the duration of the tournament.

=== Evolution ===
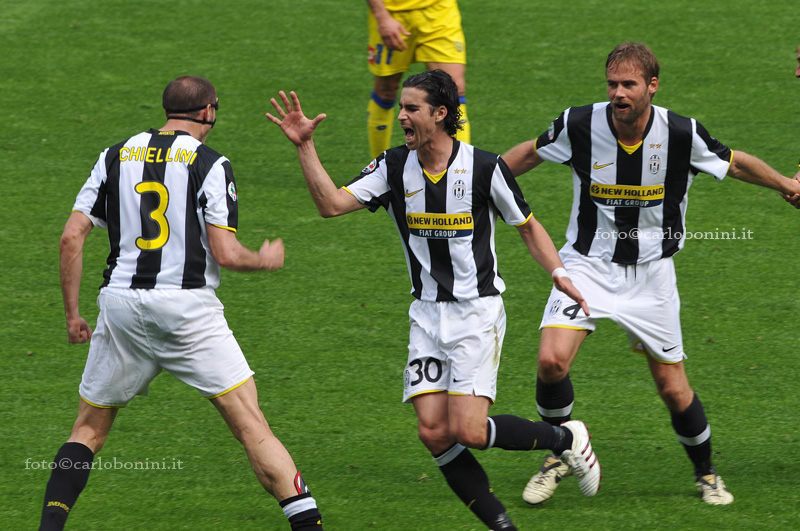
2009–10: number hard to read against stripes

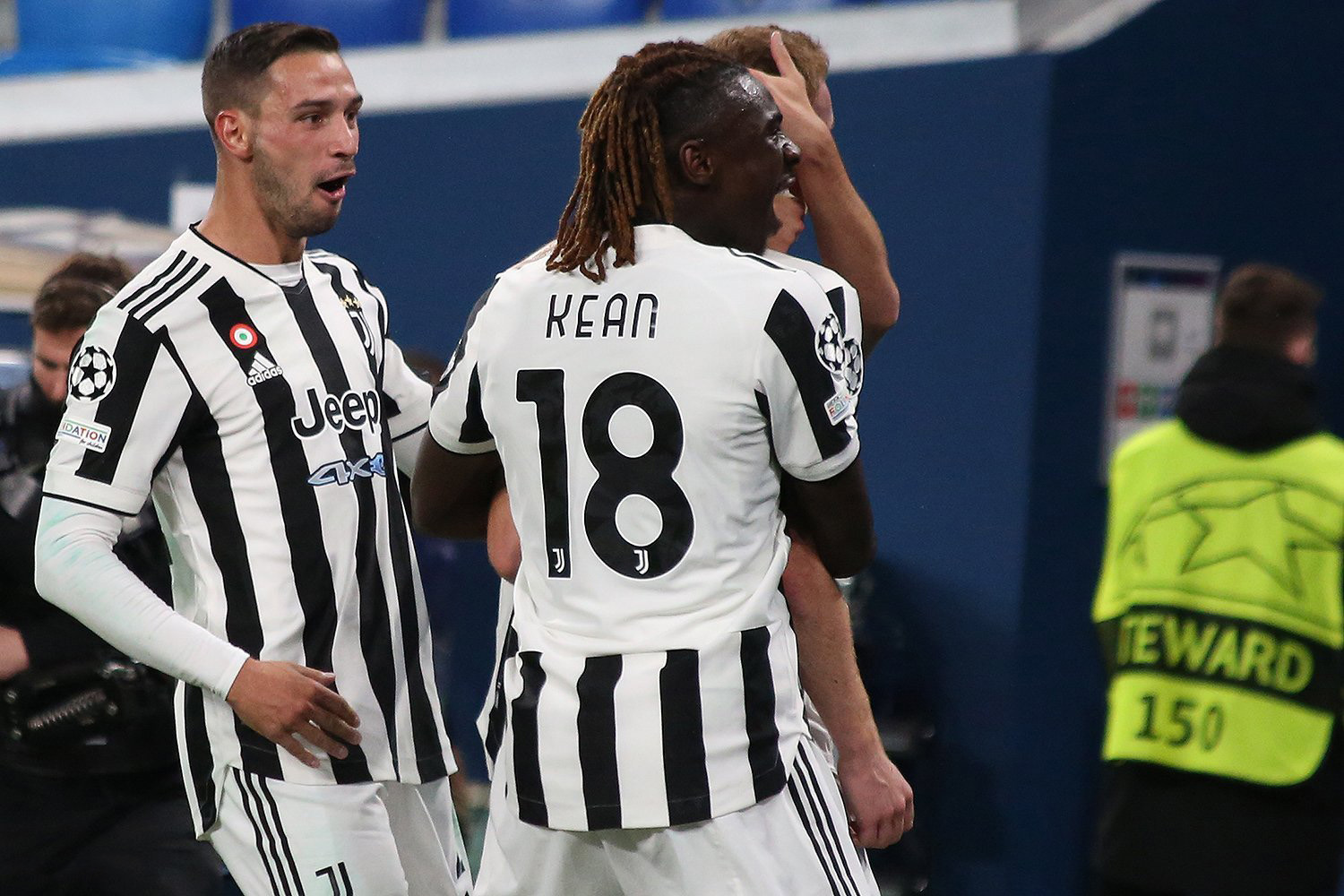
2021–22: pattern replaced behind number by solid-colour panel

High-contrast patterns make numbers hard to read; competition regulations now often prevent this, as seen on versions of Juventus FC's famous black-and-white stripes

In 1993, The Football Association (The FA) switched to persistent squad numbers, abandoning the mandatory use of 1–11 for the starting line-up. The first league event to feature this was the 1993 Football League Cup Final between Arsenal and Sheffield Wednesday, and it became standard in the FA Premier League the following season, along with names printed above the numbers. Charlton Athletic were among the ten Football League clubs who chose to adopt squad numbers for the 1993–94 season (with squad numbers assigned to players in alphabetical order according to their surname), before reverting to 1–11 shirt numbering a year later.

Squad numbers became optional in the three divisions of the Football League at the same time, but only 10 out of 70 clubs used them. One of those clubs, Brighton & Hove Albion, issued 25 players with squad numbers but reverted to traditional 1–11 numbering halfway through the season. In the Premier League, Arsenal temporarily reverted to the old system halfway through that same season, but reverted to the new numbering system for the following campaign. Most European top leagues adopted the system during the 1990s. The Football League made squad numbers compulsory for the 1999–2000 season, and the Football Conference followed suit for the 2002–03 season.

The traditional 1–11 numbers have been worn on occasions by English clubs since their respective leagues introduced squad numbers. Premier League clubs often used the traditional squad numbering system when competing in domestic or European cups, often when their opponents still made use of the traditional squad numbering system. This included Manchester United's Premier League clash with Manchester City at Old Trafford on 10 February 2008, when 1950s style kits were worn as part of the Munich air disaster's 50th anniversary commemorations.

Players may now wear any number, as long as it is unique within their squad, between 1 and 99.

In continental Western Europe this can generally be seen:

1. Goalkeeper
2. Right Back
3. Left Back
4. Centre Back
5. Centre Back (or Sweeper, if used)
6. Central Defensive/Holding Midfielder
7. Right Attacking Midfielder/Winger
8. Central/Box-to-Box Midfielder
9. Striker
10. Attacking Midfielder/Playmaker
11. Left Attacking Midfielder/Winger

This changes from formation to formation, although the defensive number placement generally remains the same. The use of inverted wingers now sees traditional right wingers (the number 7s, like Cristiano Ronaldo) on the left and traditional left wingers (the number 11s, like Gareth Bale) on the right.

== Numbering by country ==
=== Argentina ===
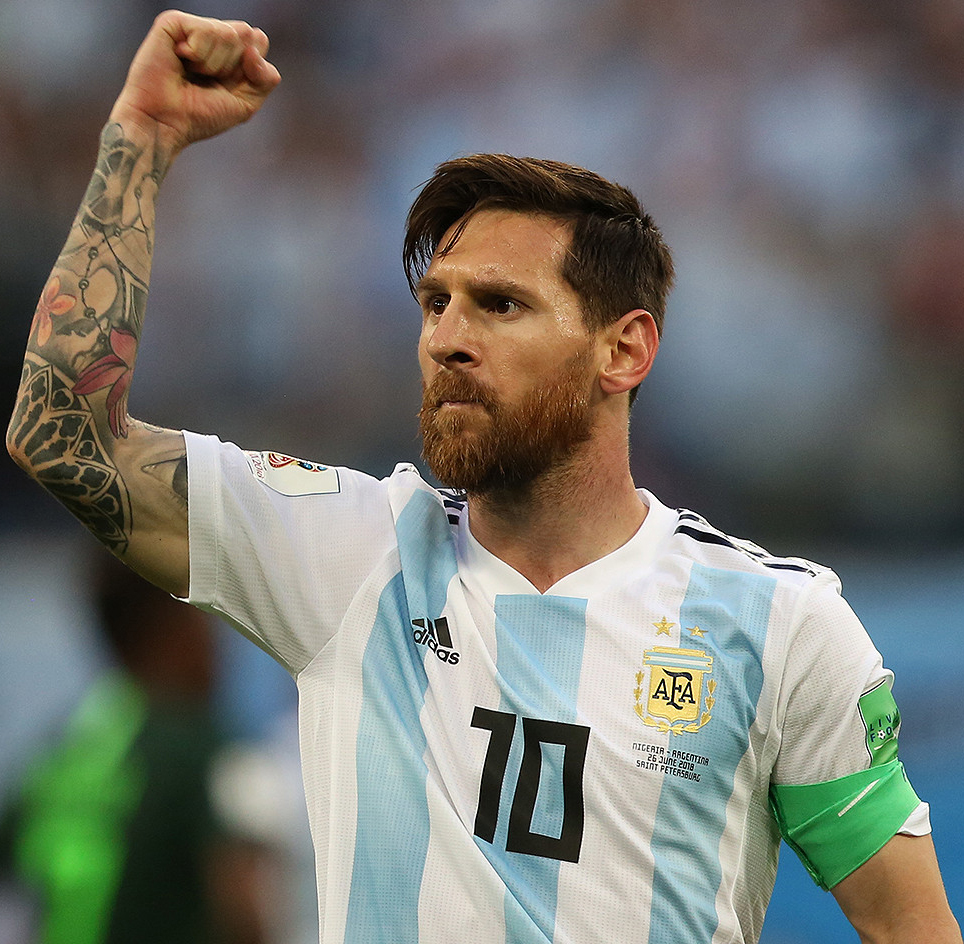
Lionel Messi displaying his squad number (10), as portrayed on his Argentina jersey in 2018

Argentina developed its numeration system independently from the rest of the world. This was because until the 1960s, Argentine football developed more or less isolated from the evolution brought by English, Italian and Hungarian coaches, owing to technological limitations at the time in communications and travelling with Europe, lack of information as to keeping up with news, lack of awareness and/or interest in the latest innovations, and strong nationalism promoted by the Asociación del Fútbol Argentino (for example, back then Argentines playing in Europe were banned from playing in the Argentine national team).

The first formation used in Argentine football was the 2–3–5 and, until the 1960s, it was the sole formation employed by Argentine clubs and the Argentina national football team, with only very few exceptions like River Plate's La Máquina from the 1940s that used 3–2–2–3. It was not until the mid 1960s in the national team, with Argentina winning the Taça das Nações (1964) using 3–2–5, and the late 1960s, for clubs, with Estudiantes winning the treble of the Copa Libertadores (1968, 1969, 1970) using 4–4–2, that Argentine football adopted European formations on major scale, and mirrored its counterparts on the other side of the Atlantic.

While the original 2–3–5 formation used the same numbering system dictated by the English clubs in 1928, subsequent changes were developed independently.

The basic formation to understand the Argentine numbering system is the 4–3–3 formation, used by the coach César Menotti for the team that won the 1978 World Cup. The squad numbers are:

- 1 Goalkeeper
- 4 Right Back
- 2 First Centre Back / Sweeper
- 6 Second Centre Back / Stopper
- 3 Left Back
- 8 Right Midfielder
- 5 Central Defensive Midfielder
- 10 Left Midfielder
- 7 Right Winger
- 11 Left Winger
- 9 Striker

=== Brazil ===
In Brazil, the 4–2–4 formation was developed independently from Europe, thus leading to a different numbering – here shown in the 4–3–3 formation to stress that in Brazil, number ten is midfield:

- 1 Goleiro (Goalkeeper)
- 2 Lateral Direito (right wingback)
- 3 Zagueiro Direito (right centre back) or Beque Central (centre back) "STOPPER"
- 4 Zagueiro Esquerdo (left centre back) or Quarto Zagueiro (the "Quarterback", almost the same as a centre back) "SWEEPER"
- 6 Lateral Esquerdo (left wingback)
- 5 Primeiro Volante ("Rudder" or "mobile", the defensive midfielder)
- 8 Segundo Volante (central midfielder) or Meia Armador (playmaker)
- 10 Meia Atacante (attacking midfielder) or Meia Esquerda (left midfielder, generally more offensive than the right one)
- 7 Ponta Direita (right winger) or Meia Direita (right midfielder)
- 9 Centroavante (centre-forward/striker)
- 11 Ponta Esquerda (left winger) or Segundo Atacante (secondary striker)

When in 4–2–4, number 10 passes to the Ponta de Lança (striker), and 4–4–2 formations get this configuration: four defenders – 2 (right wingback), 4, 3, 6 (left wingback); four midfielders – 5 (defensive), 8 ("second midfielder"), similar to a central midfielder), 7, 10 (attacking); two strikers – 9, 11

In Brazilian football, the number 24 is historically shunned because of "jogo do bicho," an illegal underground lottery. In this game, the number 24 represents the deer ("veado" in Portuguese), which sounds nearly identical to a common homophobic slur in Brazil.

=== France ===
Numbered jerseys first appeared in 1948, when France played against Italy on 4 April 1948 at Stade de Colombes, where the French team sported numbers on their jerseys (except for the keeper).

Until 2022, players were required to be registered between numbers 1–30, with 1 and 16 reserved for goalkeepers and 33 left empty for extra signings. If a further goalkeeper had to be registered, they were allocated the number 40. Since the 2022–23 Ligue 1 season, players may now wear any number between 1 and 99 without restriction.

=== Hungary ===
In Eastern Europe, the defence numbering is slightly different. The Hungarian national team under Gusztáv Sebes switched from a 2–3–5 formation to 3–2–5. So the defence numbers were 2 to 4 from right to left thus making the right back (2), centre back (3) and the left back (4). Since the concept of a flat back four the number (5) has become the other centre back.

=== Italy ===
Numbers on the jerseys were adopted in Serie A during the 1939-40 season, on 17 September 1939.

In 1995, the Italian Football Federation (FIGC) also switched to persistent squad numbers for Serie A and Serie B (second division), abandoning the mandatory use of 1–11 for the starting lineup. After some years during which players had to wear a number between 1–24, now they can wear any number between 1–99 without restrictions. Notably, Chievo Verona had the goalkeeper Cristiano Lupatelli wearing number 10 from 2001 to 2003 and midfielder Jonathan de Guzman wearing number 1 in 2016.

FIGC banned the use of the number 88 on kits in 2023 due to its anti-semitic connections; the announcement was made following several instances of neo-Nazi fans using the number.

=== Spain ===
While Real Madrid was the first team to sport jersey numbers in the home 1947-48 match against Atlético Madrid on 23 November 1947, it was in the 1948-49 season that numbered jerseys would become commonplace in La Liga.

Since the 1995-96 season, in the Spanish La Liga, players in the A-squad (maximum 25 players, including a maximum of three goalkeepers) must wear a number between 1–25. Goalkeepers must wear 1, 13 or 25. When players from the reserve team are selected to play for the first team, they are given squad numbers between 26 and 50.

=== United Kingdom ===
Players are not generally allowed to change their number during a season, although a player may change number if they change clubs mid-season. Players may change squad numbers between seasons; this often happens when a player's role in the first team increases or diminishes. Occasionally, when a player has two loan spells at the same club in a single season (or returns as a permanent signing after an earlier loan), an alternative number is needed if the original number has been reassigned.

A move from a high number to a low one may be an indication that the player is likely to be a regular starter for the coming season, particularly after at least one preceding season of increased first team opportunities. An example is Celtic's Scott McDonald, who, after the departure of former number 7 Maciej Żurawski, was given the number, a move down from 27. Another example is Steven Gerrard, who wore number 28 (his number in the academy) during his debut 1998–99 season, then switched to 17 in 2000–01. In 2004–05, after Emile Heskey left Liverpool, Gerrard then changed his number again to 8. Tottenham Hotspur striker Harry Kane changed his number from 37 for the 2013–14 season to 18 for the 2014–15 season when he became one of the club's first-choice strikers after Jermain Defoe was sold and the number 18 was vacated. Kane then switched to the number 10 for the 2015–16 season after Emmanuel Adebayor left the club and the number was vacated. Manchester City's Sergio Agüero also did a similar switch in shirt number, from number 16 in 2014–15 to number 10 in 2015–16, a number he took over from Edin Džeko following his loan departure to Roma. During the 1990s, David Beckham wore a different shirt number for Manchester United in four consecutive seasons. He was assigned the number 28 shirt for the 1993–94 season and retained it for the 1994–95 season, before switching to the number 24 shirt for the 1995–96 season, when he established himself as a regular player. He then switched to the number 10 shirt for the 1996–97 season, and following the retirement of Eric Cantona at the end of that season, he switched to the number 7 shirt for the 1997–98 season, with new signing Teddy Sheringham taking the number 10 shirt.

Some players keep the number they start their career at a club with, such as Chelsea defender John Terry, who wore the number 26 during his long spell at the club. On occasion, players have moved numbers to accommodate a new player; for example, Chelsea midfielder Yossi Benayoun handed new signing Juan Mata the number 10 shirt, and changed to the number 30, which doubles his "lucky" number 15, or when Edinson Cavani had to swap his number 7 for 21 after the arrival of Cristiano Ronaldo at Manchester United in 2021. Upon signing for Everton in 2007, Yakubu refused the number 9 shirt and asked to be assigned number 22, setting this number as a goal-scoring target for his first season, which he ultimately fell one goal short of achieving.

In a traditional 4–4–2 system in the UK, the squad numbers 1–11 would usually have been:

- 1 Goalkeeper
- 2 Right-back
- 3 Left-back
- 4 Central midfielder (more defensive)
- 5 Centre back
- 6 Centre back
- 7 Right winger
- 8 Central midfielder (more attacking/box-to-box)
- 9 Striker (usually a target player)
- 10 Second striker (usually a fast poacher)
- 11 Left winger

However, even before the introduction of squad numbers in 1993, there were many exceptions to this rule. For example, at Liverpool, the number 7 was typically associated with the team's attacking midfielder or second striker (Kevin Keegan, Kenny Dalglish, Peter Beardsley).

In a more modern 4–2–3–1 system, the numbering will typically be arranged like this:

- 1 Goalkeeper
- 2 Right-back
- 3 Left-back
- 4 Centre-back
- 5 Centre-back
- 6 Central midfielder (more defensive)
- 7 Right winger
- 8 Central midfielder (box-to-box)
- 9 Striker
- 10 Central midfielder (more attacking)
- 11 Left winger

Higher-level clubs have a tendency to field reserve and fringe players in the EFL Cup, as well as dead rubber matches towards the end of the season, so high squad numbers are not uncommon. Nico Yennaris wore 64 for Arsenal in the competition on 26 September 2012 in a match against Coventry City and on 24 September 2014, again in the League Cup, Manchester City forward José Ángel Pozo wore the number 78 shirt in a match against Sheffield Wednesday. In a quarter-final tie on 17 December 2019, Liverpool player Tom Hill became the first player in English football history to wear the number 99 shirt in a competitive match. In The Football League, the number 55 has been worn by Ade Akinbiyi for Crystal Palace, and Dominik Werling for Barnsley.

When Sunderland signed Cameroonian striker Patrick Mboma on loan in 2002, he wanted the number 70 to symbolize his birth year of 1970. The Premier League refused, however, and he wore the number 7 instead.

==== England ====
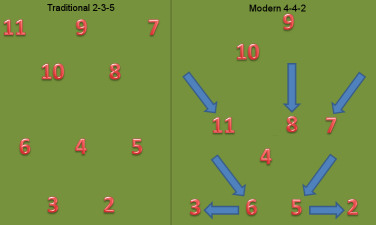
Evolution from 2–3–5 to 4–4–2

In England, in a now traditional 4–4–2 formation, the standard numbering is usually: 2 (right fullback), 5 and 6 (centre backs), 3 (left fullback); 4 (defensive midfielder), 7 (right midfielder), 8 (central/attacking midfielder), 11 (left midfielder); 10 (second/support striker), 9 (striker). This came about based on the traditional 2–3–5 system. Where the 2 fullbacks retained the numbers 2, 3. Then of the halves, 4 was kept as the central defensive midfielder, while 5 and 6 were moved backward to be in the central of defence. 7 and 11 stayed as the wide attacking players, whilst 8 dropped back a little from inside forward to a (sometimes attacking) midfield role, and 10 stayed as a second striker in support of a number 9. The 4 is generally the holding midfielder, as through the formation evolution it was often used for the sweeper or libero position. This position defended behind the central defenders, but attacked in front – feeding the midfield. It is generally not used today, and developed into the holding midfielder role.

When substitutions were introduced to the game in 1965, the substitute typically took the number 12; when a second substitute was allowed, they wore 14. Players were not compelled to wear the number 13 if they were superstitious.

=== United States and Canada ===
North American professional association football club follows a model similar to that of European clubs, with the exception that many American and Canadian clubs do not have "reserve squads", and thus do not assign higher numbers to those players.

Most American and Canadian clubs have players numbered from 1 to 30, with higher numbers being reserved for second and third goalkeepers. In the USL First Division (since merged into the current USL Championship) and Major League Soccer (MLS), there were only 20 outfield players wearing squad numbers higher than 30 on the first team in the 2009 season, suggesting that the traditional model has been followed.

In 2007, MLS club LA Galaxy retired the former playing number of Cobi Jones, number 13, becoming the first MLS team to do so. Jones allowed Jermaine Jones to wear the number in 2017.

On 4 July 2011, MLS club Real Salt Lake retired the former playing number of coach Jason Kreis, number 9, although Kreis requested that the decision be reversed eight years later because of its traditional positional usage and prestige.

On 30 July 2016, National Women's Soccer League (NWSL) club Chicago Red Stars retired Lori Chalupny's number 17. On 22 June 2019, NWSL club Washington Spirit retired Joanna Lohman's number 15.

== Goalkeeper numbering ==
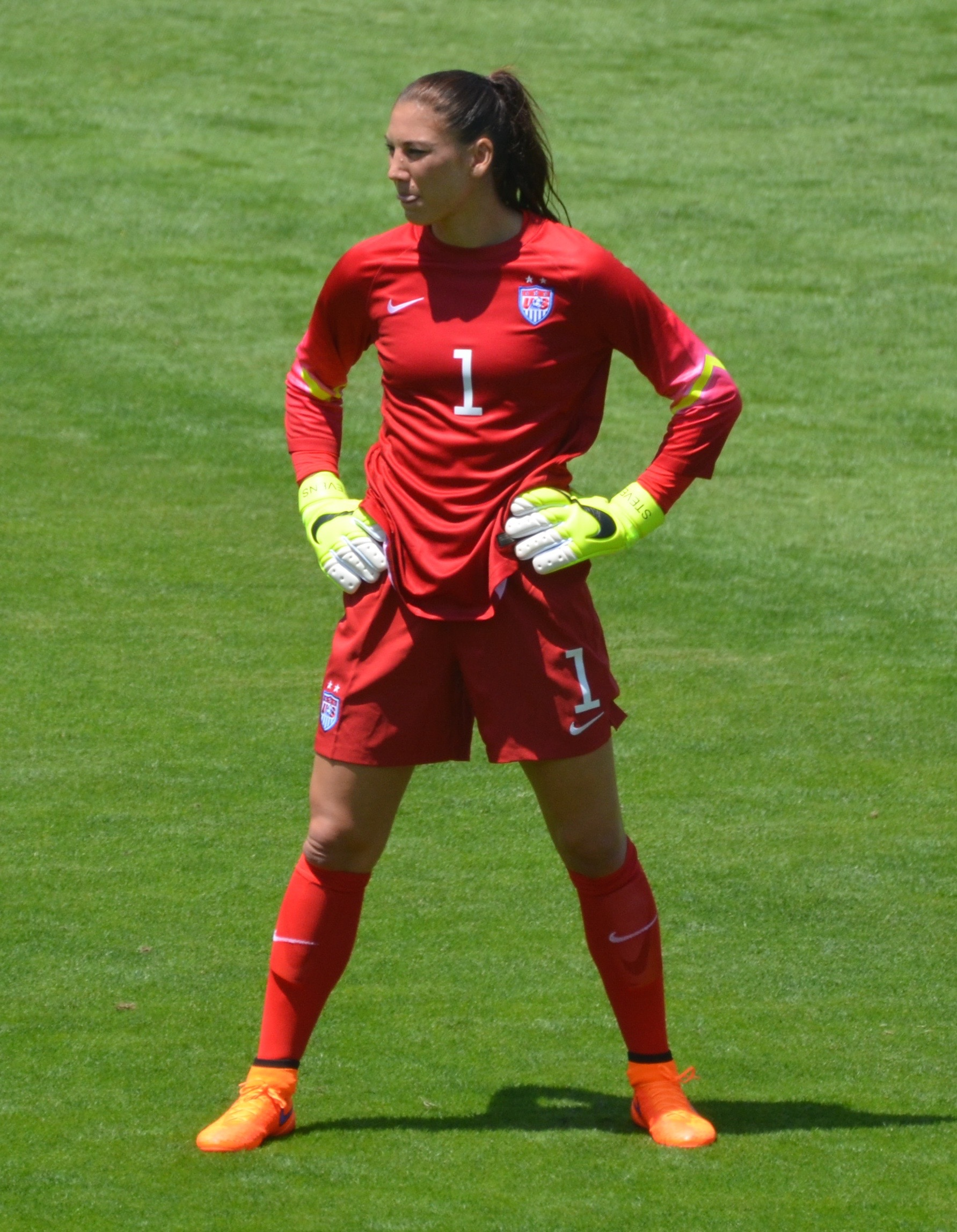
Hope Solo displaying her squad number (1), as portrayed on her US national team jersey

The first-choice goalkeeper is usually assigned the number 1 shirt as they are the first player in a line-up.

The second-choice goalkeeper wears, on many occasions, shirt number 12, which is the first shirt of the second line up, or number 13. In the past, when it was permitted to assign five substitute players in a match, the goalkeeper would also often wear the number 16, the last shirt number in the squad. Later on, when association football laws changed and it was permitted to assign seven substitute players, second-choice goalkeepers often wore the number 18. In A-League Men, second-choice goalkeepers mostly wear number 20, based on that competition having a 20-man regulated "first team" squad size.

In international tournaments (such as FIFA World Cup or continental cups) each team must list a squad of 26 players, wearing shirts numbered 1 through 26. Thus, in this case, third-choice goalkeepers often wear the number 26, or the number 23, which was the previous number of players allowed in a squad until 2021. Prior to the 2002 FIFA World Cup, only 22 players were permitted in international squads; therefore, the third goalkeeper was often allocated the number 22 jersey in previous tournaments.

The move to a fixed number being assigned to each player in a squad was initiated for the 1954 World Cup where each man in a country's 22-man squad wore a specific number for the duration of the tournament. As a result, the numbers 12 to 22 were assigned to different squad players, with no resemblance to their on-field positions. This meant that a team could start a match not necessarily fielding players wearing numbers one to eleven. Although the numbers one to eleven tended to be given to those players deemed to be the "first choice line-up", this was not always the case for a variety of reasons – a famous example was Johan Cruyff, who insisted on wearing the number 14 shirt for the Netherlands.

In the 1958 World Cup, the Brazilian Football Confederation forgot to send the player numbers list to the event organization. However, the Uruguayan official Lorenzo Villizzio assigned random numbers to the players. The goalkeeper Gilmar received the number 3, and Garrincha and Zagallo wore opposite winger numbers, 11 and 7, while Pelé was randomly given the number 10, for which he became famous.

Argentina defied convention by numbering their squads for the 1978, 1982 and 1986 World Cups alphabetically, resulting in outfield players (not goalkeepers) wearing the number 1 shirt (although Diego Maradona was given out-of-sequence number 10 in both 1982 and 1986, while Mario Kempes in 1982 and Jorge Valdano in 1986 were allowed to use number 11). In 1974 Argentina also used the alphabetical system, but only to line players and goalkeepers Daniel Carnevali and Ubaldo Fillol wore traditional goalkeeping numbers 1 and 12 respectively. England used a similar alphabetical scheme for the 1982 World Cup, but retained the traditional numbers for the goalkeepers (1, 13 and 22) and the team captain (7), Kevin Keegan. In the 1990 World Cup, Scotland assigned squad numbers according to the number of international matches each player had played at the time (with the exception of goalkeeper Jim Leighton, who was assigned an out-of-sequence number 1): Alex McLeish, who was the most capped player, wore number 2, whereas Robert Fleck and Bryan Gunn, who only had one cap each, wore numbers 21 and 22, respectively. In a practice that ended after the 1998 World Cup, Italy gave low squad numbers to defenders, medium to midfielders, and high ones to forwards, while numbers 1, 12 and 22 were assigned to goalkeepers. In July 2007, a FIFA document issuing regulations for the 2010 World Cup finally stated that the number 1 jersey must be issued to a goalkeeper.

Before the 2002 World Cup, the Argentine Football Association (AFA) attempted to retire the number 10 in honour of Maradona by submitting a squad list of 23 players for the tournament, listed 1 through 24, with the number 10 omitted. FIFA rejected Argentina's plan, with the governing body's president Sepp Blatter suggesting the number 10 shirt be instead given to the team's third-choice goalkeeper, Roberto Bonano. The AFA ultimately submitted a revised list with Ariel Ortega, originally listed as number 23, as the number 10.

In early era of Chinese football, number 0 was often assigned to a substitute goalkeeper. At least four goalkeepers had been recorded wearing number 0 on field during the early years of professional league of China: Zhao Lei from Sichuan Quanxing, Wang Zhenjie from August 1, Li Jiming from Tianjin Lifei and Li Yun from Shanghai Yuyuan.

== Unusual or notable numbers ==
- Hicham Zerouali was allowed to wear the number 0 in 2000 for Scottish Premier League club Aberdeen after the fans nicknamed him "Zero". The number was outlawed the following season.
- Outfield players have occasionally worn the number 1, including Pedro Araya Toro from Chile at the 1966 FIFA World Cup, Dutchman Ruud Geels at the 1974 FIFA World Cup, and Argentines Norberto Alonso, Osvaldo Ardiles and Sergio Omar Almirón at the 1978, 1982 and 1986 FIFA World Cup all based on squad numbers being allocated on alphabetical order (although coach Rinus Michels made an exception in 1974 for Johan Cruyff wearing number 14), At club level, there were the likes of Pantelis Kafes for Olympiacos and AEK Athens; Charlton Athletic's Stuart Balmer in the 1990s; Sliema Wanderers' David Carabott in 2005–06; Partizan's Simon Vukčević in 2004–05; Beşiktaş's Daniel Pancu in 2005–06; Atlético Mineiro's Diego Souza in 2010; and Barnet player-manager Edgar Davids in 2013–14.
- In 2001, Argentinian goalkeeper Sergio Vargas wore number 188 for Universidad de Chile as part of a commercial agreement with telecommunications brand Telefónica CTC Chile. However, the number was not allowed in international competitions, in which Vargas was forced to wear number 1.
- Italian goalkeeper Cristiano Lupatelli wore number 10 while playing for Chievo Verona, between 2001 and 2003. Lupatelli himself admitted that he did it as part of a bet he made with friends.
- In 2004, Porto goalkeeper Vítor Baía became the first player to wear 99 in the final of a major European competition, donning the kit in the 2004 UEFA Champions League Final.
- During the 1990s and early 2000s, number 58 was somewhat common among players based in or native to western Mexico, especially the city of Guadalajara. It started as a publicity stunt by radio station XEAV-AM (580 AM), branded as Canal 58. Some notable players to use number 58 were Jared Borgetti, Juan Pablo Rodríguez, Carlos Turrubiates, Eric Wynalda, Hugo Norberto Castillo, Darío Franco, Carlos María Morales, Osmar Donizete, and Benjamín Galindo.
- Also in Mexico, midfielder Marcelino Bernal typically wore number 6. When he signed with UNAM Pumas he used number 66. Right Back Defender Jorge Rodríguez was issued jersey number 9 while playing for Mexico in the 1995 King Fahd Cup, although almost universally it is the team’s main striker who wears number 9. Argentinian midfielder Antonio Mohamed asked for number 38 while playing for Irapuato, after years of wearing number 11 (3+8). From 2000 to 2002 Argentinian goalkeeper Luis Alberto Islas was issued number 5 while playing for Club Leon.
- During the late 2010’s and the 2020 decade, it has been common to see young players from Liga Mx debut using 3-digit numbers on their back, such is the case of Diego Lainez who made his debut for Club America with number 340. In later tournaments he switched to number 20.
- Chilean striker Marco Olea wore number 111 for Universidad de Chile during the 2005 season. Originally wearing number 11, he decided to give his number to Marcelo Salas upon his arrival to the club.
- Parma goalkeeper Luca Bucci wore the numbers 7 (2005–06) and 5 (2006–07 and 2007–08).
- Iván Zamorano wore number "1+8", or number 18 with a plus symbol between the two digits, for Internazionale from 1997 to 2000, after his number 9 was given to Ronaldo.
- Derek Riordan was given squad number 01 by Hibernian in the 2008–09 season. Number 10 had already been taken by Colin Nish, and none of the club's goalkeepers had been allocated number 1.
- In 2008, Milan's three new signings each chose a number indicating the year of his birth: 76 (Andriy Shevchenko, born 1976; he wore number 7 in his previous stint in the club), 80 (Ronaldinho, born 1980) and 84 (Mathieu Flamini, born 1984).
- The Asian Football Confederation (AFC) once required players to keep the same squad numbers throughout the qualification rounds for the AFC Asian Cup, resulting in players with squad numbers of 100 or higher, most notably the number 121 worn by Thomas Oar of Australia in the 2011 AFC Asian Cup qualifier match against Indonesia.
- Gary Hooper wore shirt number 88 at Celtic as his number 10 was already taken and 88 is the year (1988) he was born in. "88" (1888) is also the year Celtic played their first game. The season after Hooper signed, new signing Victor Wanyama chose the number 67 to honour the Lisbon Lions, Celtic's European Cup winning team of 1967.
- Mexican goalkeeper Guillermo Ochoa wore the number 8 shirt for the Belgian club Standard Liège in his first season at the club. According to this status, his paternal surname "Ochoa" is similar to the Spanish word for "8" (ocho), which means literally "eight". He also wore the number 6 in his second stint for Club America in his first season at the club, as his traditional number 13 was taken by Leonel López. He chose the number 6 because that was the date his niece was born, and it was the day he signed for Club America.
- When Róger Guedes signed for Sport Club Corinthians Paulista, he chose the number 123. He chose this because the numbers go 1, 2, 3..., because he has been wearing 23 for years and now that he has a son he wants to begin a new chapter of his life, which includes a new number, but still wants to retain some connection, and also because Fagner Conserva Lemos was already wearing the 23. On substitution boards, it will show 12 or 23 and someone will tell Guedes that he is going on/off.
- When Andrés Iniesta left FC Barcelona in 2018, a special "#Infinit8Iniesta" shirt was released. Although Iniesta never wore it in a match, it was sold to fans. The number on the back, instead of 8, was an infinity symbol (∞).
- Mario Balotelli wore the number 45 across several stints at Inter Milan, Manchester City, Liverpool, A.C. Milan and FC Sion. Originally, he received the squad number at Inter Milan prior to his first four matches there as youngsters at the club were assigned the squad numbers 36 to 50, explaining that he had joked that "four plus five is nine" and that he "ended up scoring a goal in all four of those matches and brought him luck". The number stuck with Balotelli after his move to Manchester City in 2010, swapping the squad number 9 with youngster Greg Cunningham, who had the squad number 45. This continued after his first stint at A.C. Milan, continuing to his move to Liverpool and then his second move to A.C. Milan on loan. However, he resorted to the squad number 9 for his stints at OGC Nice, Olympique de Marseille, and his first stint at Adana Demirspor, before going back to 45 at FC Sion. However, after FC Sion were relegated, Balotelli moved back to Adana Demirspor and chose the squad number 99.
- Phil Foden wears number 47 for Manchester City in memory of his late grandfather, who died at the age of 47.
- Juan Mata wears the number 64 to honour the birth year of his parents, doing so since signing for Vissel Kobe in 2023
- Since 2015, Elliot Lee has been wearing the number 38 in memory of his friend Dylan Tombides.

=== Commemorative numbers ===
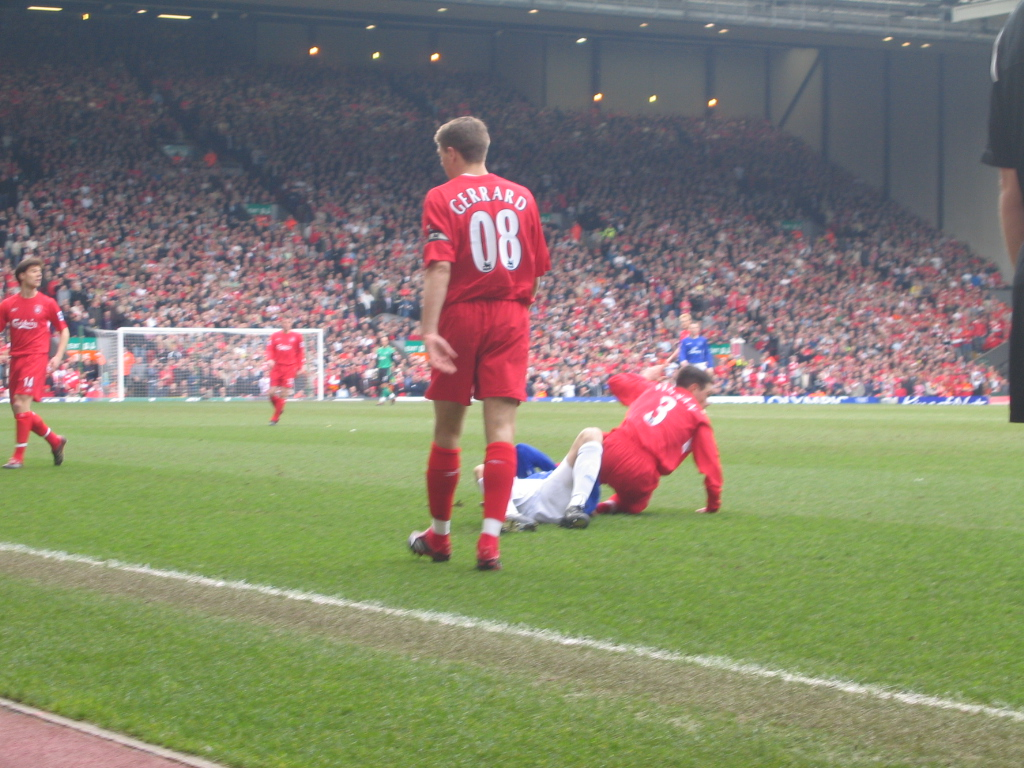
Steven Gerrard of Liverpool wearing 08 in the Merseyside derby in March 2006, to commemorate the City of Liverpool becoming the 2008 European Capital of Culture.

- Jesús Arellano, when playing for Club de Futbol Monterrey, wore the number 400 in 1996 to celebrate the city's 400th anniversary.
- Brazilian Goiás goalkeeper Harlei wore number 400 in a match in 2006, to celebrate his 400th match for the team.
- Brazilian Santos goalkeeper Fábio Costa wore number 300 in a match in 2008 to celebrate his 300th match for the team.
- Andreas Herzog wore the number 100 on his 100th match for the Austrian national team, a friendly against Norway, as he was the first Austrian player to have 100 caps.
- James Beattie of Everton and Steven Gerrard of Liverpool both wore the double-digit 08 instead of the single-digit 8 in the Merseyside derby on 25 March 2006, after approval from the Premier League, to commemorate the City of Liverpool becoming the European Capital of Culture for 2008.
- Tugay Kerimoğlu wore the number 94 on his 94th and final cap for Turkey against Brazil in 2007.
- Rubén Sosa wore number 100 for the 100th Anniversary of Nacional on 14 May 1999.
- In 1999, Pablo Bengoechea wore number 108 for the 108th Anniversary of Peñarol.
- During his record-breaking 618th game for São Paulo, Rogério Ceni wore number 618, the highest number ever worn in professional football until 2015.
- During his last match, number 100, for the Danish national team, Martin Jørgensen wore shirt number 100.
- During his record-breaking 100th cap for South Africa, Aaron Mokoena wore shirt number 100.
- In 2011, Vasco da Gama's heroes Felipe and Juninho Pernambucano wore the number 300—in different matches—to celebrate their 300th matches for the club.
- Vasco captain Juninho Pernambucano wore the number 114 against Clássico dos Gigantes rivals Fluminense for the 114th anniversary of the club in 2012.
- Goalkeeper Victor of Atlético Mineiro wore the 2019 shirt in July 2015 celebrating his contract renewal until 2019.
- In 2021, Chilean goalkeeper Claudio Bravo wore number 22 in a friendly match against Bolivia, as a tribute to former goalkeeper Mario Osbén, who died a few days before the match.

== See also ==
- List of retired numbers in association football
- Number (sports)
