= XHEBC =

Two Mexican stations bear the callsign XHEBC, both in Ensenada, Baja California:

- XHEBC-FM 97.9 FM, "Play FM"
- XHEBC-TDT virtual channel 57, transmitter for Las Estrellas
