= XHCJZ-FM =

Radio station in Ciudad Jiménez, Chihuahua

- Ciudad Jiménez, Chihuahua; Mexico
- Frequency: 105.1 MHz
- Branding: La Ke Buena

Programming
- Format: Regional Mexican
- Affiliations: Radiópolis

Ownership
- Owner: Sigma Radio; (José Luis Chavero Resendiz)
- Sister stations: XHBZ-FM, XHDCH-FM, XHJK-FM

History
- First air date: November 30, 1994 (concession)
- Call sign meaning: Ciudad JiméneZ

Technical information
- Licensing authority: CRT
- Class: B
- ERP: 30 kW
- HAAT: 26.3 m (86 ft)

Links
- Website: sigmaradiodelicias.com

XHCJZ-FM is a radio station on 105.1 FM in Ciudad Jiménez, Chihuahua, Mexico. The station is owned by Sigma Radio and carries the La Ke Buena grupera format from Radiópolis.

== History ==
XHCJZ received its concession in 1994.

While the station's concession is held by Chavero Resendiz, who owns the Sigma Radio stations in Delicias, Chihuahua, until 2020, operation was conducted by Grupo Garza Limón, which primarily operates stations in Durango.
