= XHTOT-FM =

Radio station in Tampico, Tamaulipas, Mexico

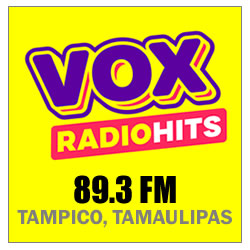
- Pueblo Viejo, Veracruz; Mexico
- Broadcast area: Tampico, Tamaulipas
- Frequency: 89.3 FM
- Branding: Vox FM

Programming
- Format: Adult contemporary
- Affiliations: Radiópolis

Ownership
- Owner: Grupo Radio Cañón; (Radio Cañón, S.A. de C.V.)

History
- First air date: November 7, 1986 (concession)
- Former call signs: XETOT-AM
- Former frequencies: 1190 kHz

Technical information
- Licensing authority: CRT
- Class: B
- ERP: 12.5 kW
- HAAT: 90.83 m (298.0 ft)
- Transmitter coordinates: 22°12′17.34″N 97°49′33.36″W

Links
- Webcast: Listen live
- Website: radiocanon.com.mx

XHTOT-FM 89.3 (branded as VOX FM Radio Hits) is a radio station in Tampico, Tamaulipas, Mexico. It is owned from Grupo Radio Cañón afiliated by Radiopolis carries a Adult contemporary format.

== History ==
XETOT-AM 1190 received its concession on November 7, 1986. It was owned by Radio Poderosa de Tamaulipas, S.A. de C.V., and broadcast from Tampico with 5,000 watts during the day and 500 at night. In 1999 and 2000, XETOT cut its daytime power to 2,000 watts and moved its transmitter across the state line to Pueblo Viejo, Veracruz. In 2010, it was approved to migrate to FM, and in 2015, XHTOT's concession was transferred to Organización Editorial Mexicana.

In April 2021, NTR acquired the ABC Radio network from OEM. In 2022, the station adopted the name "Radio Cañón", based on NTR-owned XHTGO-FM in Tlaltenango, Zacatecas.

On April 24, 2023, as part of a national alliance between the company and Radiópolis, 22 NTR-owned stations adopted franchise formats from Radiópolis. With Ke Buena, Los 40, and W Radio already represented in Tampico, XHTOT adopted the company's Spanish adult contemporary format, Vox FM Radio Hits.
