= XEMAS-AM =

Radio station in Salamanca, Guanajuato, Mexico

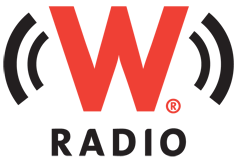
- Salamanca, Guanajuato; Mexico
- Frequency: 1560 AM
- Branding: W Radio

Programming
- Format: News/talk
- Affiliations: Radiópolis

Ownership
- Owner: Radio Grupo Antonio Contreras; (Televisora de Irapuato, S.A.)
- Sister stations: XHWE-FM

History
- First air date: March 1, 1948 (concession)
- Former call signs: XERX-AM

Technical information
- Class: C
- Power: 1 kW day/0.25 kW night

Links
- Webcast: Listen live
- Website: estacionfamiliar.com

XEMAS-AM is a radio station on 1560 AM in Salamanca, Guanajuato, Mexico. Owned by Radio Grupo Antonio Contreras, XEMAS is known as W Radio news/talk with format from Radiópolis.

== History ==
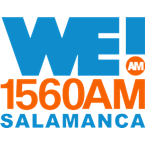
Logo as "We 1560", a partial simulcast of XHWE-FM in Irapuato

XERX-AM received its concession on March 1, 1948. Ernesto Bravo Vargas owned the station until 1971, when it was acquired by Radio Grupo Antonio Contreras and became XEMAS-AM.
