= XHDCH-FM =

Radio station in Delicias, Chihuahua, Mexico

- Delicias, Chihuahua (Santa Anita); Mexico
- Frequency: 95.3 MHz
- Branding: La Ke Buena

Programming
- Format: Regional Mexican
- Affiliations: Radiópolis

Ownership
- Owner: Sigma Radio; (Emisora de Delicias, S.A. de C.V.)
- Sister stations: XHBZ-FM, XHCJZ-FM, XHJK-FM

History
- First air date: October 28, 1994 (concession)
- Call sign meaning: Delicias CHihuahua

Technical information
- Licensing authority: CRT
- Class: B1
- ERP: 25 kW
- HAAT: 41.3 m (135 ft)
- Transmitter coordinates: 28°10′06″N 105°26′15″W

Links
- Webcast: Listen live
- Website: sigmaradiodelicias.com

XHDCH-FM is a radio station on 95.3 FM in Delicias, Chihuahua, Mexico. The station is owned by Sigma Radio and carries La Ke Buena Regional Mexican format from Radiópolis.

== History ==
XHDCH began as XEDCH-AM 1540 but quickly moved to 1180. It received its concession on October 28, 1994 and was owned by Radiorama. In 2005, the station was sold to Emisora de Delicias, which is mostly owned by José Luis Chavero Resendiz.

It migrated to FM in 2011.
