= XHERK-FM =

Radio station in Tepic, Nayarit

- Tepic, Nayarit; Mexico
- Broadcast area: Tepic, Nayarit
- Frequency: 104.9 FM
- Branding: Los 40

Programming
- Format: Pop
- Affiliations: Radiópolis

Ownership
- Owner: Grupo Radio Korita; (Radio Korita de Nayarit, S.A. de C.V.)
- Sister stations: XHSK-FM Ruiz

History
- First air date: September 14, 1939 (concession)
- Call sign meaning: "Radio Korita"

Technical information
- Licensing authority: CRT
- Class: B1
- ERP: 25 kW
- HAAT: 48.97 m (160.7 ft)
- Transmitter coordinates: 21°31′23″N 104°55′26″W

Links
- Webcast: Listen live
- Website: grk.com.mx

XHERK-FM is a radio station on 104.9 FM in Tepic, Nayarit. The station is known as Los 40.

== History ==
XERK-AM 1450 received its concession on September 14, 1939. It was owned by Darío Mondragón and broadcast with 100 watts. Ownership continued to pass through the Mondragón family. By the 1960s, it was owned by Julián Tomás Mondragón Prieto, now with 1,000 watts on 860 kHz. In 1974, control was handed to a corporation, Radio Tepic, S.A., and to Radio Korita de Nayarit in 2000. By this time, it had moved again, to 710 kHz.

Radio Korita, which long dominated the Tepic radio scene, grew to be a multi-station cluster. Many of these stations are now part of Radiorama Nayarit after Radiorama began operating the stations itself, with Korita maintaining XHERK and XHSK-FM in Ruiz.

XERK's longtime name was Radio Korita, now used as the corporate name for the business, though it is no longer the name for XHERK-FM. The station later became Fusión FM with a pop format.

On March 4, 2019, XHERK flipped to the Los 40 format from Radiópolis.
