= XHQG-FM =

Radio station in Querétaro, Mexico

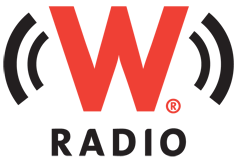
- La Noria, Querétaro; Mexico
- Broadcast area: Querétaro, Querétaro
- Frequency: 107.9 MHz
- Branding: W Radio

Programming
- Format: News/Talk
- Affiliations: Radiópolis

Ownership
- Owner: NTR Medios de Comunicación; (Radio Cañón, S.A. de C.V.)
- Operator: GlobalMedia
- Sister stations: XHPSJI-FM, XEQRMD-AM, XECCBY-AM

History
- First air date: August 24, 1967 (concession)
- Former call signs: XEQG-AM
- Former frequencies: 980 kHz, 670 kHz

Technical information
- Class: AA
- ERP: 0.5 kW
- HAAT: 267.73 m
- Transmitter coordinates: 20°32′23.6″N 100°20′48.87″W

Links
- Webcast: Listen live
- Website: https://www.globalmedia.mx/ radiocanion.com.mx

XHQG-FM is a radio station on 107.9 FM in La Noria, serving Querétaro, Querétaro, Mexico. The station is owned by NTR Medios de Comunicación operated by GlobalMedia and affiliated with W Radio.

== History ==
XHQG began as XEQG-AM 980 (later 670), awarded to Radio Querétaro, S.A., on August 24, 1967. It initially broadcast with 1,000 watts day and 150 watts night.

The station broadcasts from Cerro El Cimatario, which is a common transmitter site for TV stations serving Santiago de Querétaro. It moved there in 2007 as part of an AM power increase to 10 kW; on FM, it is authorized for the low power of 500 watts with a height above average terrain of more than 250 meters. Around this time, the concession was transferred to México Radio.

In April 2021, NTR acquired the ABC Radio network from OEM. XHQG was rebranded as "107.9 FM", dropping the "ABC" name, until it was renamed Radio Cañón in 2022 as part of a groupwide rollout of the name. On April 24, 2023, as part of a national alliance between the company and Radiópolis, twenty-two NTR-owned stations adopted franchise formats from Radiópolis, with XHQG adopting programming from W Radio as its format.

On March 24, 2025, GlobalMedia took over the operation, starting the newscast Así las Cosas en el Bajío transmitted from San Luis Potosí City.
