= XHFRT-FM =

Radio station in Comitán de Domínguez, Chiapas, Mexico

- Comitán de Domínguez, Chiapas, Mexico; Mexico
- Frequency: 92.5 MHz
- Branding: La Ke Buena

Programming
- Format: Regional Mexican
- Affiliations: Radiópolis

Ownership
- Owner: Radio Cañón; (Radio Cañón, S.A. de C.V.)
- Sister stations: XHCTS-FM

History
- First air date: September 30, 1994 (concession)
- Former call signs: XEFRT-AM
- Former frequencies: 890 kHz
- Call sign meaning: From Frontera Comalapa

Technical information
- Class: B1
- ERP: 25,000 watts
- Transmitter coordinates: 16°14′15″N 92°06′57″W

Links
- Webcast: Listen live
- Website: radiocanon.com.mx

XHFRT-FM is a radio station on 92.5 FM in Comitán de Domínguez, Chiapas, Mexico. It is owned by Radio Cañón and carries the national La Ke Buena Regional Mexican format from Radiópolis.

== History ==
XHFRT received its concession on December 17, 1976, as XEFRT-AM 890. It was owned by Ismael de Jesús Delfín Cristiani. It was sold in 2000 and migrated to FM in 2011.

In 2021, NTR acquired the ABC Radio group from Organización Editorial Mexicana. In March 2022, the station dropped its La Nueva brand and adopted the name before flipping to Radio Cañón with a grupera format. On April 24, 2023, as part of a national alliance between the company and Radiópolis, 22 NTR-owned stations adopted franchise formats from Radiópolis, with XHFRT-FM remaining in the regional format as a La Ke Buena station.
