= XHPSJI-FM =

Radio station in San José Iturbide, Guanajuato

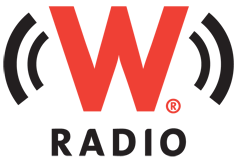
- San José Iturbide, Guanajuato; Mexico
- Frequency: 90.1 MHz (HD Radio)
- Branding: W Radio

Programming
- Format: News/talk
- Affiliations: Radiópolis

Ownership
- Owner: GlobalMedia; (Medios Digitales RMX, S.A. de C.V.)
- Sister stations: XHQG-FM, XEQRMD-AM, XECCBY-AM

History
- First air date: 2019
- Former names: Los 40
- Call sign meaning: San José Iturbide

Technical information
- Class: A
- ERP: 3 kW
- HAAT: 40.5 m
- Transmitter coordinates: 20°59′45.7″N 100°22′20.0″W

Links
- Webcast: www.globalmedia.mx/stations/LOS40QUERETARO

XHPSJI-FM is a radio station on 90.1 FM in San José Iturbide, Guanajuato. It is owned by GlobalMedia and carries the W Radio News/talk format.

== History ==
XHPSJI was awarded in the IFT-4 radio auction of 2017. The station signed on in 2019.
