= XHKG-FM =

Radio station in Fortín de las Flores, Veracruz, Mexico

- Fortín de las Flores, Veracruz, Mexico; Mexico
- Broadcast area: Córdoba, Veracruz
- Frequency: 107.5 MHz
- Branding: Los 40

Programming
- Format: Top 40 (CHR)
- Affiliations: Radiópolis

Ownership
- Owner: NTR Medios de Comunicación; (Radio Fortín, S.A.)
- Sister stations: XHEVC-FM

History
- First air date: March 14, 1960 (concession)
- Former call signs: XEKG-AM
- Former frequencies: 820 kHz

Technical information
- Class: B1
- ERP: 25,000 watts
- Transmitter coordinates: 18°54′27″N 96°58′27″W

Links
- Webcast: Listen live
- Website: grupo-rc.mx

XHKG-FM is a radio station on 107.5 FM in Fortín de las Flores, Veracruz, Mexico, serving the Córdoba market. It is owned by NTR Medios de Comunicación and carries the Los 40 national format from Radiópolis.

== History ==
XHKG received its concession on March 14, 1960 as XEKG-AM broadcasting on 820 kHz. It was owned by Radio Fortín, S.A.

It migrated to FM in 2011.

In 2021, NTR acquired the ABC Radio group from Organización Editorial Mexicana. Along with most of the ABC stations, it was rebranded initially as Radio Cañón in 2022. On April 23, 2023, as part of a national alliance between the company and Radiópolis, 22 NTR-owned stations adopted franchise formats from Radiópolis, with XHKG taking on Los 40 to complement Ke Buena on XHEVC-FM 104.5.
