= XHPSEN-FM =

Radio station in Ensenada, Baja California, Mexico

- Ensenada, Baja California; Mexico
- Frequency: 96.9 MHz (HD Radio)
- Branding: Los 40

Programming
- Format: Spanish & English Top 40 (CHR)

Ownership
- Owner: Radiópolis; (Cadena Radiópolis, S.A. de C.V.)

History
- First air date: 2019
- Call sign meaning: EnSENada

Technical information
- Licensing authority: CRT
- Class: A
- ERP: 2.929 kW
- HAAT: 20.4 m (67 ft)
- Transmitter coordinates: 31°52′28.9″N 116°37′39.1″W

Links
- Webcast: Listen live
- Website: escucha.los40.com.mx

XHPSEN-FM is a radio station on 96.9 FM in Ensenada, Baja California, Mexico. It is owned by Radiópolis and carries its Los 40 pop format.

== History ==
XHPSEN was awarded in the IFT-4 radio auction of 2017. Televisa Radio paid 32 million pesos. It came to air in October 2019, the name of Los 40 who had been on XHAT-FM 101.1 until 2017 when Audiorama decided to break all stations alliances with Televisa.
