= XHSK-FM =

Radio station in Ruiz, Nayarit, Mexico

- Ruiz, Nayarit; Mexico
- Frequency: 100.7 MHz
- Branding: La Ke Buena

Programming
- Format: Regional Mexican
- Affiliations: Radiópolis

Ownership
- Owner: Grupo Radio Korita; (Radio Ruiz, S.A. de C.V.)
- Sister stations: XHERK-FM (Tepic)

History
- First air date: January 20, 1969 (concession)
- Former frequencies: 1490 kHz (1969–2010); 106.7 MHz (2010–2019)

Technical information
- Licensing authority: CRT
- Class: B1
- ERP: 25 kW
- HAAT: 25.11 m (82.4 ft)
- Transmitter coordinates: 21°56′30″N 105°10′12″W

Links
- Website: kebuenanayarit.com.mx

XHSK-FM is a radio station on 100.7 FM in Ruiz, Nayarit. The station is owned by Grupo Radio Korita and carries the La Ke Buena Regional Mexican format brand from Radiópolis.

== History ==
Logo as "La Parranda"

XESK-AM 1490 received its concession on January 20, 1969. It was owned by Eduardo Ponce Barbosa and broadcast with 250 watts. It was transferred to the current concessionaire in 2000 and authorized to migrate to FM in 2009 as XHSK-FM on 106.7.

As part of its 2017 concession renewal, on February 27, 2019, XHSK was moved again, this time to 100.7 MHz, in order to clear 106-108 MHz as much as possible for community and indigenous radio stations.
