= XHWB-FM =

Radio station in Veracruz, Veracruz, Mexico

- Veracruz, Veracruz; Mexico
- Frequency: 98.9 MHz
- Branding: Los 40

Programming
- Format: Spanish & English Top 40 (CHR)

Ownership
- Owner: Radiópolis; (Cadena Radiodifusora Mexicana, S.A. de C.V.)

History
- First air date: January 25, 1956 (concession)
- Former call signs: XEWB-AM
- Former frequencies: 760 kHz, 900 kHz
- Call sign meaning: Station was once XEWB-AM, a repeater of XEW-AM

Technical information
- Licensing authority: CRT
- Class: B1
- ERP: 24 kW
- HAAT: 63.4 meters
- Transmitter coordinates: 19°09′51.08″N 96°07′51.04″W

Links
- Website: los40.com.mx

XHWB-FM is a radio station on 98.9 FM in Veracruz, Veracruz, Mexico. It is owned by Radiópolis and carries its Los 40 format.

== History ==
XEWB-AM received its concession on January 25, 1956. It was originally on 760 kHz with 5 kW day and 1 kW night, operated by Radio Golfo, S.A. However, in the 1960s, it began operation on 900 AM as a co-channel booster to co-owned XEW-AM in Mexico City, with 50,000 watts daytime and 5,000 watts nighttime. It operated in this role alongside the two XEWA-AM stations on 540 kHz in Monterrey and San Luis Potosí. By the 1980s, it was 50,000 watts at all hours with a directional nighttime pattern, though in the 2000s it returned to a lower power at night with 10 kW.

The AM-FM migration required the reinvention of XEWB, with its extensive service area, as a local station primarily serving central Veracruz; it adopted the Los 40 Principales format at that time. The AM station has since been shut down and dismantled.
