= XHFZC-TDT =

TV station in Zacatecas City, Mexico

- Zacatecas, Zacatecas; Mexico
- Channels: Digital: 22 (UHF); Virtual: 44

Ownership
- Owner: NTR Medios de Comunicación; (Fundación Cultural por Zacatecas, A.C.)
- Sister stations: XHCCFL-FM

History
- Call sign meaning: Fundación Cultural por Zacatecas, A.C.

Technical information
- Licensing authority: CRT
- ERP: 10.001 kW
- HAAT: 24.4 m (80 ft)
- Transmitter coordinates: 22°44′50.46″N 102°33′12.17″W

Links
- Website: ntrzacatecas.com

XHFZC-TDT is a television station on channel 22 (virtual channel 44) in Zacatecas, Zacatecas. It is a noncommercial social station owned by NTR Medios de Comunicación through concessionaire Fundación Cultural por Zacatecas, A.C.

== History ==
XHFZC and three additional television stations in Zacatecas were awarded in 2015.

== Repeaters ==
Three repeaters of XHFZC-TDT have been authorized to operate by the Federal Telecommunications Institute:

RF	Location	ERP
22	Fresnillo	.5 kW
22	Jerez	.5 kW
22	Ojocaliente	.5 kW
