= XEBA-FM =

- Guadalajara, Jalisco; Mexico
- Frequency: 97.1 MHz
- Branding: La Ke Buena

Programming
- Format: Grupera

Ownership
- Owner: Radiópolis; (Radio Tapatía, S.A. de C.V.)
- Sister stations: XEHL-FM, XHWK-FM, XELT-AM, XEZZ-AM

History
- First air date: April 9, 1968 (concession)
- Call sign meaning: BAjío

Technical information
- Licensing authority: CRT
- Class: C1
- ERP: 55,71 watts
- HAAT: 351.8 meters (1,154 ft)
- Transmitter coordinates: 20°36′00.7″N 103°21′54.07″W

Links
- Webcast: Listen live
- Website: kebuena.com.mx

XEBA-FM is a radio station on 97.1 FM in Guadalajara, Jalisco, Mexico. The station is owned by Radiópolis and broadcasts its La Ke Buena grupera format from a tower atop Cerro del Cuatro.

== History ==
XEBA-FM received its first concession on April 9, 1968. Its concessionaire, Radio Tapatía, S.A. de C.V., also owned XEBA-AM 820 before selling it to NTR.

On November 8, 2017, the IFT authorized the relocation of XEBA-FM and XEHL-FM to Cerro del Cuatro.
