= XHTAC-FM =

Radio station in Tapachula, Chiapas, Mexico

XHTAC-FM/XETAC-AM
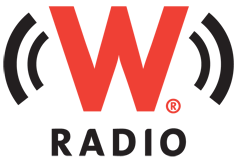
- Tapachula, Chiapas; Mexico
- Frequencies: 91.5 MHz; 1000 kHz
- Branding: W Radio

Programming
- Format: News/talk
- Affiliations: Radiópolis

Ownership
- Owner: Grupo Radio Cañón; (Radio Cañón, S.A. de C.V.)

History
- First air date: September 11, 1984; 1994 (FM)
- Call sign meaning: "Tapachula"

Technical information
- Class: B1 (FM)
- Power: 10 kW day 1 kW night
- ERP: 10 kW
- HAAT: 42.4 m (FM)
- Transmitter coordinates: 14°53′23.69″N 92°13′45.28″W

Links
- Webcast: Listen live
- Website: grupo-rc.mx

XHTAC-FM 91.5/XETAC-AM 1000 is a combo radio station Tapachula, Chiapas, Mexico. The station is owned by Radio Cañón and carries the W Radio news/talk format from Radiópolis.

== History ==
XETAC received its concession in September 1984 and its FM combo in 1994. The AM transmitter is located in El Sacrificio.

In 2021, NTR acquired the ABC Radio group from Organización Editorial Mexicana. The station continued to broadcast the Exa FM pop format from MVS Radio until April 16, 2023, when NTR's four Exa FM stations left the network. On April 23, 2023, as part of a national alliance between the company and Radiópolis, 22 NTR-owned stations adopted franchise formats from Radiópolis. With Ke Buena and Los 40, already represented in Tapachula, XHTAC–XETAC joined the W Radio news/talk network.
