= XHEVC-FM =

Radio station in Fortín, Veracruz

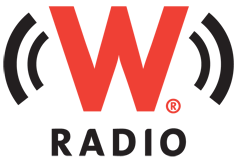
- Fortín de las Flores, Veracruz; Mexico
- Broadcast area: Córdoba
- Frequency: 104.5 MHz
- Branding: W Radio

Programming
- Format: News/talk
- Affiliations: Radiópolis

Ownership
- Owner: NTR Medios de Comunicación; (Radio Cañón, S.A. de C.V.)
- Sister stations: XHKG-FM

History
- First air date: April 20, 1960 (concession)
- Former call signs: XEVC-AM
- Former frequencies: 700 kHz
- Call sign meaning: VC for VeraCruz, E added in AM-FM migration

Technical information
- ERP: 25,000 watts
- Transmitter coordinates: 18°54′27″N 96°58′27″W

Links
- Webcast: Listen live
- Website: grupo-rc.mx

XHEVC-FM is a radio station on 104.5 FM in Fortín de las Flores, Veracruz, Mexico. It is owned by NTR Medios de Comunicación and carries the W Radio format from Radiópolis.

== History ==
XHEVC received its concession on April 20, 1960, as XEVC-AM, broadcasting on 700 kHz. It was owned by Carlos Ferraez Matos.

It migrated to FM in 2011.

In 2021, NTR acquired the ABC Radio group from Organización Editorial Mexicana. The station was known as La Más Guapa, La Guapachosa from 2022 to 2023. On April 23, 2023, as part of a national alliance between the company and Radiópolis, 22 NTR-owned stations adopted franchise formats from Radiópolis, with XHEVC switching to the Ke Buena Regional Mexican format. The station switched again to W Radio in October 2023.
