= XHTXO-FM =

Radio station in Taxco de Alarcón, Guerrero, Mexico

- Taxco, Guerrero; Mexico
- Frequency: 92.9 MHz
- Branding: Los 40

Programming
- Format: Spanish & English Top 40 (CHR)
- Affiliations: Radiópolis

Ownership
- Owner: NTR Medios de Comunicación.; (Radio Cañón, S.A. de C.V.)
- Sister stations: XHXC-FM

History
- First air date: September 4, 1991 (concession)
- Call sign meaning: "Taxco"

Technical information
- ERP: 14.1 kW

XHTXO-FM is a radio station on 92.9 FM in Taxco, Guerrero, Mexico. It is owned by NTR Medios de Comunicación. and carries the Los 40 franchise pop format.

== History ==
XHTXO received its concession on September 4, 1991. It was initially owned by Edilberto Huesca Perrotín, owner of NRM Comunicaciones, and known as "Super Stereo". In 2002, ownership transferred to Super Stereo de Guerrero, S.A. de C.V. Two years later, the station was rebranded "Oye 92.9", in line with XEOYE-FM in Mexico City. The current concessionaire received the station in 2008 and adopted the Exa FM format.

In 2021, NTR acquired the ABC Radio group from Organización Editorial Mexicana. The station continued to broadcast the Exa FM pop format from MVS Radio until April 16, 2023, when NTR's four Exa FM stations left the network. On April 24, 2023, as part of a national alliance between the company and Radiópolis, 22 NTR-owned stations adopted franchise formats from Radiópolis, with XHTXO-FM remaining in the pop format with Los 40.
