= XEHL-FM =

Radio station in Guadalajara, Jalisco, Mexico

- Guadalajara, Jalisco; Mexico
- Frequency: 102.7 MHz
- Branding: Los 40

Programming
- Format: Contemporary hit radio

Ownership
- Owner: Radiópolis; (Radio Melodía, S.A. de C.V.)
- Sister stations: XEBA-FM, XHWK-FM, XELT-AM, XEZZ-AM

History
- First air date: April 2, 1969 (concession)

Technical information
- Licensing authority: CRT
- Class: C1
- ERP: 83.62 kW
- HAAT: 346 meters (1,135 ft)
- Transmitter coordinates: 20°36′00.7″N 103°21′54.07″W

Links
- Webcast: Listen live
- Website: escucha.los40.com.mx

XEHL-FM is a radio station on 102.7 FM in Guadalajara, Jalisco, Mexico. The station is owned by Radiópolis and carries its Los 40 format.

== History ==
XEHL-FM received its first concession on April 2, 1969. It was the sister FM to XEHL-AM 1010 and was known as Sonido 103. The station retained this name through the 1990s, including after the 1992 sale of original owner Radio Comerciales de Jalisco to Radiópolis. In 1999, it switched to English-language alternative music as Radical 102.7, tweaking the format to pop and rock in English as FrecuenciAdictiva 102.7. In 2003, XEHL-FM changed to pop as Vox FM, becoming a Los 40 station the next year.

On November 8, 2017, the IFT authorized the relocation of XEHL-FM to Cerro del Cuatro.
