= XHXC-FM =

Radio station in Taxco de Alarcón, Guerrero, Mexico

- Taxco, Guerrero, Mexico; Mexico
- Frequency: 96.1 MHz
- Branding: Ke Buena

Programming
- Format: Grupera
- Affiliations: Radiópolis

Ownership
- Owner: NTR Medios de Comunicación; (Radio Cañón, S.A. de C.V.)
- Sister stations: XHTXO-FM

History
- First air date: October 24, 1959 (concession)
- Former call signs: XEXC-AM
- Former frequencies: 1270 kHz, 1480 kHz
- Call sign meaning: From "Taxco"

Technical information
- ERP: 1,500 watts
- Transmitter coordinates: 18°33′46″N 99°36′46″W

XHXC-FM is a radio station on 96.1 FM in Taxco, Guerrero, Mexico. It is owned by NTR Medios de Comunicación and carries the national Ke Buena grupera format from Radiópolis.

== History ==
XEXC-AM received its concession in 1959. It was owned by Benito García Aceves and broadcast on 1270 kHz, though it quickly moved to 1480. In 1996, it was sold to Rosalinda Bustamante Sosa, who in turn sold XEXC in 2002 to Super Mil de Guerrero, S.A. de C.V. By the 2002 sale, XEXC had moved to 960 kHz; at this time it was carrying a grupera format known as La Más Perrona. In 2008, Super Mil sold it to ABC Radio.

In 2011, XEXC migrated to FM on 96.1 MHz.

In 2021, NTR acquired the ABC Radio group from Organización Editorial Mexicana. On April 24, 2023, as part of a national alliance between the company and Radiópolis, 22 NTR-owned stations adopted franchise formats from Radiópolis, with XHXC-FM taking on the La Ke Buena franchise.
