= XHCTS-FM =

Radio station in Comitán de Domínguez, Chiapas, Mexico

- Comitán de Domínguez, Chiapas, Mexico; Mexico
- Frequency: 95.7 MHz
- Branding: Los 40

Programming
- Format: Pop
- Affiliations: Radiópolis

Ownership
- Owner: Grupo Radio Cañón; (Radio Cañón, S.A. de C.V.)
- Sister stations: XHFRT-FM

History
- First air date: August 8, 1990 (concession)
- Call sign meaning: Comitán, Chiapas

Technical information
- ERP: 25,000 watts

Links
- Webcast: Listen live
- Website: radiocanon.com.mx

XHCTS-FM is a radio station on 95.7 FM in Comitán, Chiapas, Mexico. It is owned by Grupo Radio Cañón and carries the Los 40 national format from Radiópolis.

== History ==
XHCTS received its concession on August 8, 1990, owned by Ismael de Jesús Delfín Cristiani. It was sold to the current concessionaire in 2000.

In 2021, NTR acquired the ABC Radio group from Organización Editorial Mexicana. The station continued to broadcast the Exa FM pop format from MVS Radio until April 16, 2023, when NTR's four Exa FM stations left the network. On April 24, 2023, as part of a national alliance between the company and Radiópolis, 22 NTR-owned stations adopted franchise formats from Radiópolis, with XHCTS-FM remaining in the pop format with Los 40.
