= XEHL-AM =

Radio station in Guadalajara, Jalisco, Mexico

- San Juan de Ocotán-Guadalajara, Jalisco; Mexico
- Frequency: 1010 kHz
- Branding: W Deportes

Programming
- Format: Sports/Talk
- Affiliations: Radiopolis

Ownership
- Owner: NTR Medios de Comunicación; (TV Zac, S.A. de C.V.)
- Sister stations: XEAV-AM, XEBA-AM, XHABCJ-FM

History
- First air date: June 17, 1941 (concession)

Technical information
- Licensing authority: CRT
- Class: B
- Power: 50,000 watts day
- Transmitter coordinates: 20°44′12.7″N 103°20′56.6″W

Links
- Webcast: Listen live
- Website: grupo-rc.mx

XEHL-AM is a radio station on 1010 AM in Guadalajara, Jalisco, Mexico, known as W Deportes.

== History ==
XEHL received its concession on June 17, 1941, and signed on the next year. It was owned by Radio Anunciadora Kist, S. de R.L. and operated on 1370 kHz, later moving to 1010. XEHL was affiliated to Radio Programas de México until 1949, when owner Alejandro Díaz Guerra broke ties with RPM. XEHL operated with 10,000 watts day/5,000 watts night from the time it moved to 1010 until the 1980s, when it increased daytime power to 50,000 watts.

In 1984 it was known as "La Poderosa HL" means a Mexican regional and grupera music format.

It remained part of the Díaz family through various owners until Francisco Javier Díaz Romo sold many of his Guadalajara stations from Radio Comerciales to Jalisco to Televisa Radio in 1992. In the 1990s, then XEHL became Furia Musical, and the other format is Radio Oasis. In 2003 it was decided to convert W Radio to repeat on XEWK-AM 1190, and then in 2004 it became a rock format "Sol Radiante" and in 2007 repeating XEX-AM known as Estadio W then in 2012 as "TDW" and in 2017 to "W Deportes".

In 2018, Televisa sold XEHL-AM to TV Zac, S.A. de C.V. However, NTR Medios de Comunicación did not begin programming XEHL on its own until September 16, 2019, when W Deportes left the air in Guadalajara to make way for Radio Cañón, a simulcast of XEHL and fellow NTR acquisition XEBA-AM with music in English and six hours of daily news programs on weekdays.
