= XEZZ-AM =

Radio station in Guadalajara, Jalisco, Mexico

- Huentitán el Bajo, Jalisco; Mexico
- Broadcast area: Guadalajara, Jalisco
- Frequency: 760 kHz
- Branding: Radio Gallito

Programming
- Format: Regional Mexican

Ownership
- Owner: Radiópolis; (XEZZ, S.A. de C.V.)
- Sister stations: XHWK-FM, XEHL-FM, XEBA-FM, XELT-AM

History
- First air date: January 15, 1953 (concession)

Technical information
- Licensing authority: CRT
- Class: B
- Power: 5,000 watts
- Transmitter coordinates: 20°43′54.1″N 103°19′07.1″W

Links
- Webcast: http://tunein.com/share/popout/s91368/
- Website: radiogallito.com.mx

XEZZ-AM is a radio station on 760 AM in Huentitán el Bajo, Jalisco. It is owned by Radiópolis and known as Radio Gallito, carrying a Regional Mexican format. 760 AM is a United States clear-channel frequency.

== History ==
XEZZ received its concession on January 15, 1953 as XEHJ-AM. The 5,000-watt daytimer was owned by María Cruz de la Torre and located in Tonalá, where it was moved after a brief stint in Zapotlanejo. Melodía 76, S.A., became the concessionaire in 1966, and XEZZ, S.A. de C.V. took over that position in 1982, the same year the station became known as Radio Gallito.
