= XELT-AM =

Radio station in Guadalajara, Jalisco

- Huentitán el Bajo, Guadalajara, Jalisco; Mexico
- Frequency: 920 kHz
- Branding: Radio María

Programming
- Format: Catholic religious

Ownership
- Owner: Radiópolis; (Radio Tapatía, S.A. de C.V.)
- Operator: Fundación Cultural para la Sociedad Mexicana, A.C.
- Sister stations: XHWK-FM, XEHL-FM, XEBA-FM, XEZZ-AM

History
- First air date: April 27, 1944

Technical information
- Licensing authority: CRT
- Class: B
- Power: 10 kW day 1 kW night
- Transmitter coordinates: 20°43′54.1″N 103°19′07.1″W

Links
- Website: www.radiomariamexico.com

XELT-AM is a radio station on 920 AM in Guadalajara, Jalisco. It is known as Radio María and carries a Catholic religious format.

The station's concession is held by Radiópolis, but the station is operated by Fundación Cultural para la Sociedad Mexicana, A.C., the organization that owns all Radio María stations in Mexico. Radio María Mexico has its studios and national headquarters in Zapopan.

== History ==
XELT signed on April 27, 1944, on 840 kHz, owned by J. H. Tostado Lomelí. It was later acquired by the Radio Comerciales group, making it sister to XEAD, XEHL, XEJE and XEBA.

In 1987, Radio Comerciales split in two; Francisco Javier Díaz Romo picked up XEZZ, XELT, XEBA-AM-FM and XEHL-AM-FM and operated them as Radio Comerciales de Jalisco. In 1992, Radiópolis bought the stations to mark its first holdings outside of Mexico City.

In 1992, the station became an early grupera format station known as La Sabrosita; this ended when XEBA-FM was relaunched as Ke Buena the next year and absorbed many of its DJs, and XELT evolved toward a tropical format. After a brief run as news-talk Frecuencia Libre, XELT became known as "Radio Escucha", with a strong schedule of local programming that rivaled even XEWK. This lasted until 1998, when the highest-rated programs moved to XEWK and the station picked up romantic music as RadioAmor.

In 2002, XELT flipped to religious music as Radio Oasis. A year later, on May 31, 2003, XELT became Radio María. It was the first Radio María station in Mexico.
