= UABC Radio =

Radio network of the Universidad Autónoma de Baja California

- Ensenada, Mexicali and Tijuana, Baja California; Mexico
- Frequency: (see table)
- Branding: UABC Radio

Programming
- Format: University radio

Ownership
- Owner: Autonomous University of Baja California

History
- First air date: April 8, 1976
- Call sign meaning: XHUAC: Universidad Autónoma de Baja California; XHBA: BAja California

Technical information
- Licensing authority: CRT
- Class: (see table)
- ERP: (see table)
- HAAT: (see table)

Links
- Webcast: Listen live
- Website: radio.uabc.mx

UABC Radio is a radio station in the state of Baja California, with transmitters in Ensenada, Mexicali and Tijuana. The station is owned by the Autonomous University of Baja California and broadcasts a cultural radio format.

== History ==
Radio Universidad was created in 1976 to serve as UABC's radio service. UABC had been producing radio programs since 1964 when it began creating La Hora Universitaria Radiofónica but did not have a station of its own until April 8, 1976. A 250-watt transmitter carried the sounds of Beethoven's 5th Symphony to Mexicali that night. In 1978, the station was properly permitted with a power of 100,000 watts.

On February 23, 1987, Radio Universidad expanded to Ensenada on XHUAC-FM 95.5, and on February 24, 2000, XEUT-AM came to air in Tijuana. On 1630 kHz, XEUT was just the second AM expanded band station authorized in Mexico (behind XEUACH-AM, which launched in 1997).

In 2011, the system was relaunched under its current name and with a new administrative structure.

== Transmitters ==
UABC Radio has three stations:

Call sign	Frequency	City	Class	ERP	HAAT
XHUAC-FM	95.5 FM	Ensenada	A	3 kW	−123 m (−404 ft)
XHBA-FM	104.1 FM	Mexicali	C	100 kW	47.68 m (156.4 ft)
XECPTB-AM	1630 AM	Tijuana	B	10 kW (day); 1 kW (night)	none
