= XHWE-FM =

Radio station in Irapuato, Guanajuato, Mexico

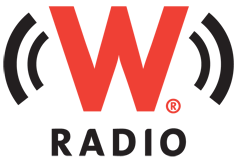
- Irapuato, Guanajuato; Mexico
- Frequency: 107.9 FM
- Branding: W Radio

Programming
- Format: News/talk
- Affiliations: Radiópolis

Ownership
- Owner: Radio Grupo Antonio Contreras; (XEWE Radio Irapuato, S.A. de C.V.)

History
- First air date: October 28, 1941 (concession)

Technical information
- ERP: 3 kW
- Transmitter coordinates: 20°42′12.92″N 101°20′28.51″W

Links
- Webcast: Listen live
- Website: wradioirapuato.com

XHWE-FM is a radio station on 107.9 FM in Irapuato, Guanajuato, Mexico. The station is owned by Radio Grupo Antonio Contreras and carries the W Radio news/talk format from Radiópolis.

== History ==
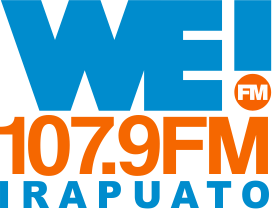
Logo used as WE 107.9 Radio until January 2025

XEWE-AM received its concession on October 28, 1941, broadcasting with 100 watts on 1420 kHz. It was owned by Felipe Gallardo. It later expanded to 10,000 watts day and then 1,000 watts night.

XEWE migrated to FM in 2011. On January 15, 2025, it became an affiliate of the W Radio network.
