= XHAT-FM =

Radio station in Ensenada, Baja California, Mexico

- Ensenada, Baja California; Mexico
- Frequency: 101.1 MHz
- Branding: Estéreo Sol

Programming
- Format: Classic hits

Ownership
- Owner: Grupo Radiorama; (XHAT, S.A. de C.V.)
- Operator: Radio Cadena Enciso
- Sister stations: XHEPF-FM, XHEBC-FM

History
- First air date: February 16, 1994

Technical information
- Licensing authority: CRT
- Class: AA
- ERP: 3,320 watts
- HAAT: 167.9 m (551 ft)

Links
- Webcast: www.rceradio.net

XHAT-FM is a radio station in Ensenada, Baja California, Mexico. It broadcasts on 101.1 FM, XHAT-FM is owned by Grupo Radiorama and operated by Radio Cadena Enciso and is known as Estéreo Sol with a classic hits format.

== History ==
XHAT belonged to Grupo ACIR from August 1994 to July 2009 and was originally known as "Stereo Festival" and later "La Comadre", both with Regional Mexican music formats, before becoming "Estéreo Sol".

Logo used when the station used the Los 40 format

In 2009, Radiorama assumed operation of many of ACIR's smaller-market stations, with the station becoming known as "Sol FM" before adopting the Los 40 Principales franchised format. In 2017, all of the Grupo Audiorama stations dropped their Televisa Radio formats, including XHAT, which remained in the format with Audiorama's own Súper brand. This continued until March 2023, when Audiorama ceased operating the station. It returned to the Radiorama cluster at that time and relaunched as Estéreo Sol on May 5, airing classic hits in English and Spanish.
