= XEAV-AM =

Radio station in Guadalajara, Jalisco, Mexico

Simulcast of XHABCJ-FM 95.9
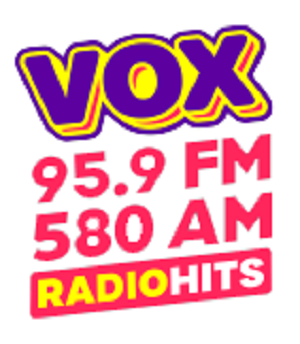
- Tlaquepaque, Jalisco; Mexico
- Broadcast area: Guadalajara, Jalisco
- Frequency: 580 AM
- Branding: Vox Radio Hits

Programming
- Format: Adult Contemporary
- Affiliations: Radiopolis

Ownership
- Owner: Radio Cañón; (México Radio, S.A. de C.V.)
- Sister stations: XHABCJ-FM, XEHL-AM, XEBA-AM

History
- First air date: October 21, 1942 (concession)
- Call sign meaning: Alfredo Vázquez Tello

Technical information
- Licensing authority: CRT
- Class: B
- Power: 10,000 watts daytime 1,000 watts nighttime
- Transmitter coordinates: 20°36′46.7″N 103°17′55.2″W

Links
- Webcast: Listen live
- Website: grupo-rc.mx

XEAV-AM is a radio station serving the Guadalajara, Jalisco, Mexico area. The station broadcasts on 580 AM.

The station currently operates the Vox FM brand, in simulcast with XHABCJ-FM, but from its beginnings until 2023, it was one of the most important radio stations in the city of Guadalajara, Canal 58.

== History ==
XEAV received its first concession in 1942. It was owned by Alfredo Vázquez Tello.
