= Fundación Cultural para la Sociedad Mexicana =

Mexican owner of noncommercial radio stations

Fundación Cultural para la Sociedad Mexicana, A.C. (Cultural Foundation for the Mexican Society) is a Mexican civil association whose primary activity is the operation of radio stations.

The radio stations owned by FCSM are noncommercial (social) stations with Radio Maria programming. This is noteworthy, as Mexican law restricts religious programming on radio and prohibits the ownership of broadcast outlets by religious associations.

== Stations ==
FCSM owns 11 radio stations, all but one on the FM band. The stations at Ensenada, Zamora, Guasave, Ciudad Obregón and San Miguel de Allende were awarded in 2017 and 2018; León was approved in December 2019. Ensenada launched in February 2020 and Zamora near the end of the year.

Since 2003, FCSM has programmed XELT-AM in Guadalajara, with the station's commercial concession registered to Radiópolis. XELT is the national originating station, with the headquarters and studios for Radio Maria Mexico located in Zapopan. In December 2020, it began airing programming on commercial XEUR-AM in Mexico City to early 2022.

Call sign	Frequency	City	ERP/power
XHARB-FM	101.9	Ensenada, BC	3 kW
XHFSM-FM	100.7	Puerto Vallarta, Jal.	3 kW
XHJAC-FM	105.7	Zamora-Jacona, Mich.	3 kW
XHFCSM-FM	94.1	Cuernavaca, Mor.	.5 kW
XHPBP-FM	106.7	Puebla, Pue.	3 kW
XHCSM-FM	107.9	San Luis Potosí, SLP	3 kW
XHFCS-FM	90.3	Culiacán, Sin.	15 kW
XHAVE-FM	90.5	Guasave, Sin.	25 kW
XHCOB-FM	95.3	Ciudad Obregón, Son.	
XHPEBH-FM	91.5	León, Gto.	
XELT-AM	920	Guadalajara, Jal.	10 kW (day); 1 kW (night)

=== Defunct stations ===
Call sign	Frequency	City	ERP/power
XEFCSM-AM	680	Mérida, Yuc.	2.5 kW (day); 1 kW (night)
XESMA-AM	1280	San Miguel de Allende, Gto.	2.5 kW (day)

FCSM surrendered its concession for XEFCSM-AM 680 in Mérida in a letter dated January 29, 2021. The letter cited economic conditions and the COVID-19 pandemic in Mexico, as well as declining AM listening, the increased amount of pirate and other stations, and rising crime. While the XESMA-AM 1280 went unbuilt and was surrendered.
