= XHEPF-FM =

Radio station in Ensenada, Baja California, Mexico

- Ensenada, Baja California; Mexico
- Frequency: 89.1 FM
- Branding: La Rancherita

Programming
- Format: Regional Mexican

Ownership
- Owner: Gloria Herminia Enciso Power; Gloria Herminia, Maricel, José Enrique, Marcia, Claudia Beatriz and Laura Elena Jiménez Enciso
- Operator: Radio Cadena Enciso
- Sister stations: XHEBC-FM, XHAT-FM

History
- First air date: September 16, 1941; September 10, 2012 (FM)
- Former call signs: XEPF-AM
- Former frequencies: 1400 kHz (1941–2014)

Technical information
- Licensing authority: CRT
- Class: AA
- ERP: 6,000 watts
- HAAT: 95.93 m (314.7 ft)
- Transmitter coordinates: 31°52′34″N 116°38′30″W

Links
- Webcast: Listen live
- Website: larancheritaensenada.com

XHEPF-FM is a radio station broadcasting on 89.1 FM in Ensenada, Baja California. It is owned by Radio Cadena Enciso and is known as La Rancherita, carrying a Regional Mexican format.

== History ==
Luis Enrique Enciso received the concession for XEPF-AM 1400 on May 16, 1941, and the station signed on four months later. It has remained in the Enciso family ever since. Until 1980, it was known as Radio Onda; it became La Rancherita, broadcasting ranchera music and La Efectiva with a Regional Mexican format in 2006. On September 10, 2012, XHEPF-FM 89.1 came to the air and became operated by Grupo Radiorama/Audiorama, originally with a Spanish adult contemporary format known as Estéreo Vida and later Vida 89.1, with XEPF ceasing operations on AM in 2014.

In 2015, XHEPF and XHHC-FM 92.1 swapped formats, with XHEPF returning to a Regional Mexican format known as La Bestia Grupera.

On May 31, 2021, Grupo Audiorama ceased programming XHEPF-FM. On June 1, Radio Resultados, another Grupo Radiorama component, took over and moved the Fiesta Mexicana format from XHEBC-FM 97.9. In May 2022, XHEPF and XHEBC were relaunched, with XHEPF returning to the La Rancherita name.
