= XHMOE-FM =

Radio station in Mexicali, Baja California, Mexico

- Mexicali, Baja California; Mexico
- Frequency: 90.7 MHz
- Branding: Los 40

Programming
- Format: Spanish & English Top 40 (CHR)

Ownership
- Owner: Radiópolis; (Radiotelevisora de Mexicali, S.A. de C.V.)
- Sister stations: XHABCA-FM, XEMMM-AM

History
- First air date: 1993
- Call sign meaning: Original specified location of Ciudad Morelos

Technical information
- Licensing authority: CRT
- Class: C1
- ERP: 100 kW
- HAAT: 114.31 m (375.0 ft)

Links
- Website: escucha.los40.com.mx/emisora/los40_mexicali

XHMOE-FM (90.7 FM) is a radio station in Mexicali, Baja California, Mexico. Broadcasting on 90.7 FM, XHMOE is owned by Radiópolis and carries the Los 40 format.

== History ==
The station's concession was awarded in 1993.
