= XHEBC-FM =

Radio station in Ensenada, Baja California, Mexico

- Ensenada, Baja California; Mexico
- Frequency: 97.9 MHz
- Branding: Play FM

Programming
- Format: Pop

Ownership
- Owner: Radio Cadena Enciso; (EBC Radio, S.A. de C.V.)
- Sister stations: XHEPF-FM, XHAT-FM

History
- First air date: September 14, 1994
- Former call signs: XEEBC-AM
- Former frequencies: 730 kHz (1994–2016)
- Call sign meaning: Ensenada, Baja California

Technical information
- Licensing authority: CRT
- Class: AA
- ERP: 6,000 watts
- HAAT: 131.26 m (430.6 ft)
- Transmitter coordinates: 31°52′34″N 116°38′30″W

Links
- Webcast: Listen live

XHEBC-FM is a radio station in Ensenada, Baja California, Mexico. Broadcasting on 97.9 FM, XHEBC is owned by Grupo Radiorama.

== History ==
XHEBC as Fiesta Mexicana (2016–2021)

XEEBC-AM received its concession on November 11, 1994, though it had signed on in September. It broadcast on 730 kHz with 1,000 watts day and 250 watts night; its concession was originally held by Radiorama subsidiary Radio Vinculación, S.A. Despite being originally owned by Radiorama, Radiorama affiliates have not owned the station for its entire history; instead, it was bought by Grupo ACIR and broadcast its national Radio ACIR programming, except for a period between 1997 and 2000 when it was known as Azul 730. It changed to contemporary music in Spanish as Inolvidable in 2003, which lasted until XEEBC flipped to Regional Mexican as La Comadre in 2007.

Radiorama assumed operational control of the station in 2009. It was briefly rebranded La Picuda before becoming a franchise of the Ke Buena national format from Televisa Radio.

XEEBC migrated to FM in 2011 as XHEBC-FM 97.9. The AM transmitter went off the air in 2016; that year, the station relaunched as Fiesta Mexicana.

On June 1, 2021, Radio Resultados gained control of XHEPF-FM 89.1 and moved the Fiesta Mexicana format to that frequency. Arroba FM, the company's pop format, then launched on XHEBC-FM. In May 2022, Radio Resultados ceased managing this station, which remained a pop outlet under a new brand, Play FM.
