= XEMMM-AM =

Radio station in Mexicali, Baja California, Mexico

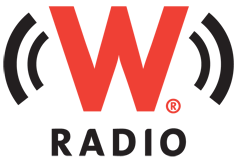
- Mexicali, Baja California; Mexico
- Frequency: 940 kHz
- Branding: W Radio

Programming
- Format: News/talk
- Affiliations: Radiópolis

Ownership
- Owner: NTR Medios de Comunicación; (Radio Cañón, S.A. de C.V.)
- Sister stations: XHABCA-FM, XHMOE-FM

History
- First air date: 1955
- Former call signs: XEWV-AM (1955–2003)
- Call sign meaning: Mario Marcos Mayans (founder of Cadena Baja California, former owner)

Technical information
- Licensing authority: CRT
- Class: C
- Power: 1 kW day.1 kW night

Links
- Webcast: Listen live
- Website: grupo-rc.mx

XEMMM-AM is a radio station in Mexicali, Baja California, Mexico, broadcasting on 940 AM. The station is owned by Radio Cañón and carries the W Radio news/talk format from Radiópolis.

== History ==
XEWV-AM received its concession in March 1955. In 1974, Cadena Baja California (now Grupo Cadena) bought XEWV-AM.

The call sign was changed to XEMMM-AM in 2003 after the Tijuana station that held those calls became XESPN-AM. The next year, CBC sold XEMMM to Organización Editorial Mexicana, which had also bought 820 AM at the same time. The station was known as Radio Mexicali before adopting an oldies format, known as 940 Oldies, in 2007.

In 2021, NTR acquired the ABC Radio group from Organización Editorial Mexicana. On April 23, 2023, as part of a national alliance between the company and Radiópolis, 22 NTR-owned stations adopted franchise formats from Radiópolis. With Los 40 already represented in Mexicali, XEMMM-AM picked up the W Radio news/talk format.
