= XEBA-AM =

Radio station in Guadalajara, Jalisco, Mexico

- Belisario Domínguez-Guadalajara, Jalisco, Mexico; Mexico
- Frequency: 820 kHz
- Branding: La Q

Programming
- Format: Mexican Regional
- Affiliations: Radiopolis

Ownership
- Owner: Grupo Radio Cañón; (TV Zac, S.A. de C.V.)
- Sister stations: XEHL-AM, XEAV-AM, XHABCJ-FM

History
- First air date: May 14, 1943 (concession)
- Former frequencies: 840 kHz
- Call sign meaning: BAjío

Technical information
- Licensing authority: CRT
- Class: B
- Power: 10,000 watts day/100 watts night
- Transmitter coordinates: 20°44′12.7″N 103°20′56.6″W

Links
- Webcast: Listen live
- Website: grupo-rc.mx

XEBA-AM is a radio station on 820 AM in Guadalajara, Jalisco, known as La Q.

== History ==
XEBA received its concession on May 14, 1943. It was owned by Concepción Romo Romo and broadcast as a daytimer with 1,000 watts. Radio Tapatía became the concessionaire in 1965, and in the 1990s, XEBA raised power to 10,000 watts and began nighttime broadcasts with 100 watts.

XEBA became "La Consentida" in 1989.

In 2017, XEBA-AM was sold by Televisa Radio to Zacatecas-based media conglomerate NTR Medios de Comunicación, doing business as TV Zac, S.A. de C.V. However, NTR did not begin programming XEBA on its own until September 16, 2019, when La Consentida left the air to make way for Radio Cañón, a simulcast of XEBA and fellow NTR acquisition XEHL-AM with music in English and six hours of daily news programs on weekdays.

XEBA-AM logo as La Consentida
