= XHBZ-FM =

Radio station in Ciudad Delicias, Chihuahua, Mexico

- Delicias, Chihuahua; Mexico
- Frequency: 100.5 MHz
- Branding: Los 40

Programming
- Format: Spanish & English Top 40 (CHR)
- Affiliations: Radiópolis

Ownership
- Owner: Sigma Radio; (XEBZ La Voz de Meoqui, S.A. de C.V.)

History
- First air date: March 2, 1962 (concession)

Technical information
- Licensing authority: CRT
- Class: B1
- ERP: 25 kW
- HAAT: 35.2 m (115 ft)
- Transmitter coordinates: 28°11′21″N 105°26′56″W

Links
- Webcast: Listen live
- Website: sigmaradiodelicias.com

XHBZ-FM is a radio station on 100.5 FM in Delicias, Chihuahua, Mexico. The station is owned by Sigma Radio and carries the Los 40 national format from Radiópolis.

== History ==
XHBZ began as XEBZ-AM 1590, located more specifically in Meoqui. It received its concession on March 2, 1962, and was owned by La Voz de Meoqui, S.A., broadcasting as a daytimer. By the 2000s, it had moved to Delicias and added nighttime service.

It migrated to FM in 2011.
