= XHTGO-FM =

Radio station in Guadalupe Victoria, Zacatecas, Mexico

XHTGO-FM/XETGO-AM
- Guadalupe Victoria, Zacatecas; Mexico
- Broadcast area: Tlaltenango, Zacatecas
- Frequencies: 90.1 FM; 1100 AM
- Branding: La Ke Buena

Programming
- Format: Regional Mexican
- Affiliations: Radiópolis

Ownership
- Owner: NTR Zacatecas; (TV Zac, S.A. de C.V.)
- Sister stations: XHFZC-TDT Zacatecas City

History
- First air date: May 27, 1993 (concession)
- Call sign meaning: "Tlaltenango"

Technical information
- Licensing authority: CRT
- Class: B1 (FM); B (AM)
- Power: 30 kW
- ERP: 25 kW
- HAAT: −211.09 m (−692.6 ft)
- Transmitter coordinates: 21°49′25.2″N 103°17′30.6″W

Links
- Webcast: Listen live
- Website: radiocanon.com.mx

XHTGO-FM/XETGO-AM is a radio station on 90.1 FM and 1100 AM in Guadalupe Victoria, Zacatecas, licensed to Tlaltenango. The station is owned by NTR Zacatecas and known as La Ke Buena national Regional Mexican format from Radiópolis.

== History ==
XETGO-AM 1100 received its concession in 1993, broadcasting with 5,000 watts at day and 400 at night. XETGO was authorized to migrate to FM in 2011 and holds a continuity obligation for 28,648 otherwise unserved listeners to remain on AM.

== Repeaters ==
In 2017, TV Zac, S.A. de C.V., a company co-owned with NTR Zacatecas, obtained concessions to build six new radio stations in Zacatecas, five of which signed on in June 2021 as rebroadcasters of XHTGO. All are required to use HD Radio, a commitment that was worth a point bonus in the IFT-4 auction.

Rebroadcasters of XHTGO-FM
Call sign	Frequency	City	Class	ERP	HAAT	Coordinates
XHPINO-FM	102.5 MHz	Pinos	A	13 watts	651.4 m (2,137 ft)	22°18′53.9″N 101°33′48.4″W
XHCCFE-FM	91.9 MHz	Fresnillo	A	0.050 kW	207.4 m (680 ft)	
XHCCFJ-FM	92.9 MHz	Valparaíso	A	3 kW	−158.4 m (−520 ft)	
XHPJAL-FM	103.9 MHz	Jalpa	AA	0.550 kW	0.6 m (2 ft 0 in)	
XHPORO-FM	101.3 MHz	Concepción del Oro	A	100 watts	608.6 m (1,997 ft)	24°36′52.1″N 101°27′39.3″W
XHPRIO-FM	98.7 MHz	Río Grande	AA	150 watts	78.3 m (257 ft)	23°54′43.2″N 103°09′04.3″W
XHPSBZ-FM	92.3 MHz	Sombrerete	AA	130 watts	779.6 m (2,558 ft)	23°40′43.4″N 103°47′00.4″W

An additional station, XHPFRZ-FM 94.3 in Fresnillo (50 watts ERP, 193.3 meters HAAT, and 23°12′56.79″N 102°53′01.09″W), was launched along with these, but split to air W Radio when XHTGO flipped to La Ke Buena in April 2023.
