= Radiópolis =

Mexican radio broadcaster

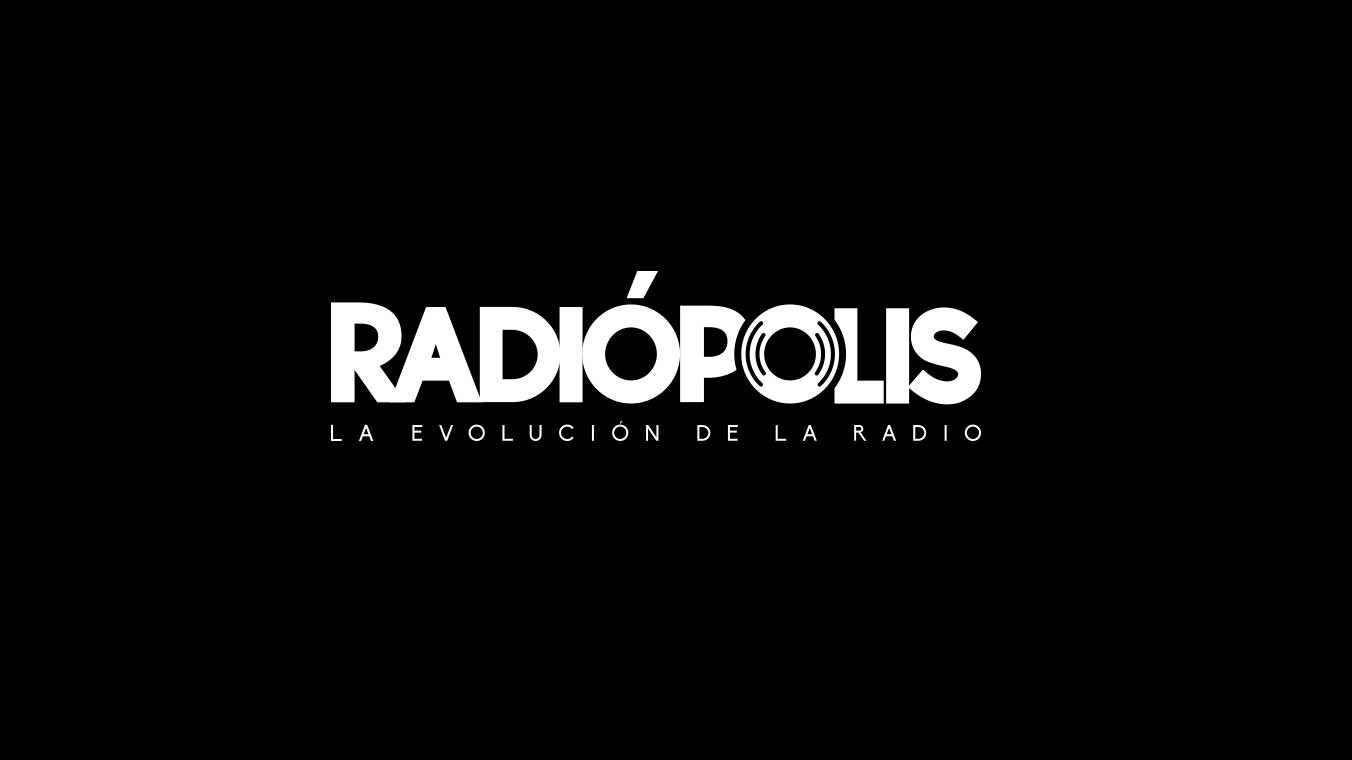
Logo

Radiópolis (incorporated as Sistemas Radiópolis, S.A. de C.V.) is a Mexican radio broadcast company that owns AM and FM radio stations in Mexico and syndicates music and talk formats. It is the former radio division of Televisa, which spun its stake off to Corporativo Coral, S.A. de C.V., in 2020 to focus on its core television and telecommunications businesses. Since 2001, it has been a joint venture with Spanish media conglomerate Grupo PRISA.

== History ==
Radiópolis got its start with the establishment of each of the Mexico City stations in the 1930s and 1940s. XEW-AM, founded by Emilio Azcárraga Vidaurreta, came on air September 18, 1930 and immediately became the country's most important broadcaster. XEQ-AM was established eight years later, and in 1947, XEX-AM joined the stable. Several repeaters of XEW were built in the late 1940s and early 1950s, including XEWK-AM in Guadalajara, Jalisco, two XEWA-AM stations in Monterrey, Nuevo León and the city of San Luis Potosí, and XEWB-AM in Veracruz. In 1975, Grupo Radiópolis was officially formed, including XEW, XEQ and XEX as well as their FM counterparts.

1992 saw the acquisition of the former Radio Comerciales de Jalisco stations in Guadalajara owned by Francisco Javier Díaz Romo, including XEBA-AM-FM, XEHL-AM-FM, XELT-AM and XEZZ-AM. These were the first Radiópolis stations outside of Mexico City, excluding the repeaters which no longer rebroadcast XEW. The group also expanded into Mexicali, Baja California with XHMOE-FM.

The 1990s saw several notable leaders head up Radiópolis. The first, journalist Ricardo Rocha, had been tapped in 1995 to revive the radio station division but was seen to be using Radiópolis as a "trampoline" into the television industry. After he left for Grupo ACIR in 1998, Eugenio Bernal took his place. Bernal renamed Radiópolis to Televisa Radio and reorganized XEW-AM and XEQ-AM into two similar "networks", the Cadena Azul y Plata (with a more traditional format) and Cadena Verde y Oro (focusing on a male audience).

In May 2000, Televisa attempted to buy Grupo Radio Centro, a major competitor in the Mexico City radio market and the country's leading radio broadcaster. The two announced an agreement in principle for a merger. The Federal Competition Commission recommended that Televisa sell some stations, and ultimately, three months after the announcement, talks ended, in a surprise to markets. Analysts suggested regulatory hurdles, dissent within the Aguirre family which owned Radio Centro, and a dispute over GRC's valuation as reasons for the sale falling apart. Another roadblock was that newscaster José Gutiérrez Vivó, who hosted the Monitor newscasts on Radio Red, refused to work with Televisa.

With its bid to buy GRC frustrated, Televisa next targeted another of its main rivals, Grupo ACIR, which at the time was Mexico's largest owner and operator of radio stations. In September 2000, Televisa announced it had spent $MXN101 million to purchase 27.82 percent of the company and combine its operations with Radiópolis to form Grupo ACIR-Radiópolis, which would have controlled 116 stations serving 96% of the country. Three months later, however, the Federal Competition Commission unanimously denied the bid, saying that the combination of ACIR-Radiópolis with the nation's dominant television broadcaster would have given Televisa an unfair advantage in securing advertisers. The antitrust authority cited that ACIR-Radiópolis would have controlled 174 stations—12.44 percent of the national total.

With both of its bids to acquire another broadcaster thwarted, Televisa turned to Grupo PRISA from Spain. In October 2001, PRISA bought 49% of Sistema Radiópolis, a $50 million investment for the company. PRISA put its expertise in radio, as owner of the successful Cadena SER, to work. In 2002, XEW was relaunched as "W Radio" and XEX-FM flipped from a pop format known as Vox FM to PRISA's Los 40 Principales format, which entered Mexico for the first time. Televisa Radio, in turn, signed a deal with Radiorama in order to syndicate the W Radio and Los 40 Principales formats along with its own Ke Buena Regional Mexican concept across the country. Other local and regional broadcasters, including Radio Núcleo in Chiapas and Grupo Chávez Radio in Sinaloa (later the partnership ended in mid-2021 due to acquisition of two stations, branded as "Vibra Radio"), carry Ke Buena and Los 40 formats on some of their stations.

In 2007, Televisa considered cutting ties with PRISA due to stagnant sales revenue.

Televisa Radio added two stations and sold two in 2017 and 2018. The IFT-4 radio auction saw Televisa victorious in Puerto Vallarta, Jalisco, where it launched XHPTOJ-FM in May 2019, and Ensenada, Baja California, where it holds the concession for XHPSEN-FM 96.9. However, Televisa also sold two stations, XEBA-AM and XEHL-AM, to TV Zac, S.A. de C.V.

On July 17, 2019, Televisa announced the sale of its 50 percent share in Sistemas Radiópolis, S.A. de C.V., to companies controlled by Miguel Alemán Magnani, owner of the Interjet airline. Televisa had previously announced its plans to sell its stake, citing a desire to divest non-core business assets and focus on its television and telecommunications businesses. The Federal Telecommunications Institute approved the sale in August. However, the deal collapsed on September 30, 2019, due to an inability to secure credit. After a court ordered Coral to pay Televisa, the deal was renewed, and the acquisition was completed on July 2, 2020.

== Formats ==
Radiópolis primarily syndicates the Ke Buena Regional Mexican format and Los 40, PRISA's pop format, which was introduced in Mexico when PRISA bought 49% of Televisa Radio. In 2015, including its 17 owned-and-operated stations, it had 98 affiliates reaching 28 of Mexico's 32 states. It also syndicates W Radio, a talk format still featured on XEW-AM/FM, to a smaller stable of stations. The remaining AM stations generally carry other formats, ranging from sports to Catholic radio.

== Stations ==
Radiópolis holds the concessions for the following 17 stations:

=== Mexico City ===
- XEX-AM 730
- XEQ-FM 92.9 and XEQ-AM 940
- XEW-FM 96.9 and XEW-AM 900
- XEX-FM 101.7

=== Guadalajara ===
- XEBA-FM 97.1
- XHWK-FM 101.5
- XEHL-FM 102.7
- XEZZ-AM 760
- XELT-AM 920 (operated by Fundación Cultural para la Sociedad Mexicana, A.C.)

=== Monterrey ===
- XHWAG-FM 88.5

=== Other cities ===
- XHPSEN-FM 96.9, Ensenada, Baja California
- XHMOE-FM 90.7, Mexicali, Baja California
- XHPTOJ-FM 91.1, Puerto Vallarta, Jalisco (operations subcontracted to GlobalMedia)
- XHEWA-FM 103.9 and XEWA-AM 540, San Luis Potosí, San Luis Potosí (operations subcontracted to GlobalMedia)
- XHWB-FM 98.9, Veracruz, Veracruz

=== Affiliate ===
In alliance with Grupo Radio Cañón.

- XHMAR-FM 98.5 and XEMAR-AM 710, Acapulco, Guerrero
- XHBB-FM 101.5 and XEBB-AM 600, Acapulco, Guerrero
- XHAGE-FM 102.3, Acapulco, Guerrero
- XHCCBL-FM 93.5, Cadereyta, Querétaro (operations subcontracted to GlobalMedia)
- XECCCN-AM 640, Calera, Zacatecas
- XHCCBM-FM 95.7, Cancún, Quintana Roo (Future)
- XHCCBQ-FM 92.1, Chetumal, Quintana Roo
- XHEZUM-FM 105.1, Chilpancingo, Guerrero
- XHCCCY-FM 94.3, Chalchihuites, Zacatecas (Future)
- XHFRT-FM 92.5, Comitán, Chiapas
- XHCTS-FM 95.7, Comitán, Chiapas
- XHPORO-FM 101.3, Concepción del Oro, Zacatecas (repeater of XHTGO-FM)
- XECCCG-AM 1020, Cañitas de Felipe Pescador, Zacatecas (repeater of XHCCFL-FM)
- XHCCCX-FM 88.1, Cañitas de Felipe Pescador, Zacatecas (repeater of XHTGO-FM)
- XHEVC-FM 104.5, Córdoba, Veracruz
- XHKG-FM 107.5, Córdoba, Veracruz
- XHCCAU-FM 92.5, Durango, Durango
- XHCCFE-FM 91.9, Fresnillo, Zacatecas (repeater of XHTGO-FM)
- XHPFRZ-FM 94.3, Fresnillo, Zacatecas (repeater of XHCCFL-FM)
- XHABCJ-FM 95.9 and XEAV-AM 580, Guadalajara, Jalisco
- XEBA-AM 820, Guadalajara, Jalisco
- XEHL-AM 1010, Guadalajara, Jalisco
- XHIGA-FM 93.9, Iguala, Guerrero
- XECCBX-AM 1470, Irapuato-León, Guanajuato (operations subcontracted to GlobalMedia)
- XHCCFG-FM 105.7, Juan Aldama, Zacatecas (Future)
- XHPJAL-FM 103.9, Jalpa, Zacatecas (repeater of XHTGO-FM)
- XHVOX-FM 98.7, Mazatlán, Sinaloa
- XHENX-FM 104.3, Mazatlán, Sinaloa
- XEMMM-AM 940, Mexicali, Baja California
- XHABCA-FM 101.3, Mexicali, Baja California
- XEABC-AM 760, Mexico City
- XEL-AM 1260, Mexico City
- XHCCFH-FM 93.5, Miguel Auza, Zacatecas (Future)
- XHOK-FM 90.9, Monterrey, Nuevo León
- XHOCA-FM 89.7, Oaxaca, Oaxaca
- XHKC-FM 100.9, Oaxaca, Oaxaca
- XHPINO-FM 102.5, Pinos, Zacatecas (repeater of XHTGO-FM)
- XHCCBA-FM 96.7, Puerto Vallarta, Jalisco (operations subcontracted to GlobalMedia)
- XHEG-FM 92.1 Puebla, Puebla
- XHQG-FM 107.9, Querétaro, Querétaro (operations subcontracted to GlobalMedia)
- XECCBY-FM 1250, Querétaro, Querétaro (operations subcontracted to GlobalMedia)
- XHPRIO-FM 98.7, Río Grande, Zacatecas (repeater of XHTGO-FM)
- XECCBU-AM 1290, Salvatierra, Guanajuato (operations subcontracted to GlobalMedia)
- XECCBB-AM 1590, San Francisco del Rincón, Guanajuato (operations subcontracted to GlobalMedia)
- XHCCBY-FM 95.7, San Luis Potosí, San Luis Potosí (operations subcontracted to GlobalMedia)
- XHCCFI-FM 99.1, Sain Alto, Zacatecas (Future)
- XHPSBZ-FM 92.3, Sombrerete, Zacatecas (repeater of XHTGO-FM)
- XECCSZ-AM 830, Sombrerete, Zacatecas (Future)
- XHTOT-FM 89.3, Tampico, Tamaulipas
- XHTAC-FM 91.5 and XETAC-AM 1000, Tapachula, Chiapas
- XHTXO-FM 92.9, Taxco, Guerrero
- XHXC-FM 96.1, Taxco, Guerrero
- XHTGO-FM 90.1 and XETGO-AM 1100, Tlaltenango, Zacatecas
- XHTOL-FM 102.9, Toluca, State of Mexico
- XHCCAR-FM 95.9, Torreón, Coahuila
- XHCCBU-FM 95.5, Tulum, Quintana Roo
- XHCCFJ-FM 92.9, Valparaíso, Zacatecas (repeater of XHTGO-FM)
- XHCCFK-FM 102.1, Villanueva, Zacatecas (repeater of XHTGO-FM)
- XHKV-FM 88.5 and XEKV-AM 740, Villahermosa, Tabasco
- XHSAT-FM 90.1, Villahermosa, Tabasco
- XHOP-FM 96.5, Villahermosa, Tabasco
- XHJH-FM 92.9, Xalapa, Veracruz
- XHCCFL-FM 104.9, Zacatecas, Zacatecas

In alliance with GlobalMedia.

- XEROPJ-AM 1030, León, Guanajuato-Lagos de Moreno, Jalisco
- XHPVA-FM 90.3, Puerto Vallarta, Jalisco
- XHCJU-FM 95.9, Puerto Vallarta, Jalisco
- XEQRMD-AM 1310, Querétaro, Querétaro
- XHPSJI-FM 90.1, San Jose Iturbide, Guanajuato
- XHOD-FM 96.9, San Luis Potosí, San Luis Potosí
- XHPM-FM 100.1, San Luis Potosí, San Luis Potosí
- XHBM-FM 105.7 and XEBM-AM 820, San Luis Potosí, San Luis Potosí
- XEFRTM-AM 770, Zacatecas, Zacatecas (operations subcontracted to Grupo Radio Cañón)

In alliance with Radio Núcleo.

- XHEMG-FM 94.3, Arriaga, Chiapas
- XHEOB-FM 91.3, Pichucalco, Chiapas
- XHETS-FM 94.7, Tapachula, Chiapas
- XHEZZZ-FM 99.5, Tapachula, Chiapas
- XHTGZ-FM 96.1, Tuxtla Gutiérrez, Chiapas
- XHUD-FM 100.1, Tuxtla Gutiérrez, Chiapas
- XHQQQ-FM 89.3, Villahermosa, Tabasco
- XHEPAR-FM 101.5, Villahermosa, Tabasco

In alliance with Radio TV México.

- XHBL-FM 91.9, Culiacán, Sinaloa
- XHMIL-FM 90.1, Los Mochis, Sinaloa

In alliance with Grupo AS Comunicación.

- XHNK-FM 99.3, Nuevo Laredo, Tamaulipas
- XHENI-FM 93.7, Uruapan, Michoacán
- XHMU-FM 90.1, Tampico, Tamaulipas
- XHRW-FM 97.7, Tampico, Tamaulipas
- XHS-FM 100.9, Tampico, Tamaulipas

In alliance with Núcleo Comunicación del Sureste.

- XHAC-FM 102.7, Campeche, Campeche
- XHESE-FM 96.7, Champotón, Campeche
- XHESC-FM 103.9, Escárcega, Campeche
- XHTH-FM 105.7, Palizada, Campeche

In alliance with Cadena RASA.

- XHCJ-FM 94.3, Apatzingán, Michoacán
- XHMQM-FM 90.9, Mérida, Yucatán
- XHUL-FM 96.9, Mérida, Yucatán
- XHZN-FM 88.1, Zamora, Michoacán

In alliance with Encuentro Radio.

- XHYG-FM 90.5, Matías Romero, Oaxaca
- XHCE-FM 95.7, Oaxaca, Oaxaca
- XHPNX-FM 98.1, Pinotepa Nacional, Oaxaca
- XHHLL-FM 97.1, Salina Cruz, Oaxaca

In alliance with SIGMA Radio.

- XHDCH-FM 95.3, Ciudad Delicias, Chihuahua
- XHBZ-FM 100.5, Ciudad Delicias, Chihuahua
- XHCJZ-FM 105.1, Ciudad Jiménez, Chihuahua

In alliance with AP Grupo Radio.

- XHCCAT-FM 93.7, Canatlán, Durango
- XHCCAV-FM 94.9, Durango, Durango
- XHCCCD-FM 98.5, El Fuerte, Sinaloa
- XHPNVO-FM 93.3, El Salto, Durango

In alliance with Grupo Radiofónico Zer.

- XHNNO-FM 99.9, Agua Prieta, Sonora
- XHAGA-FM 95.7, Aguascalientes, Aguascalientes

In alliance with Multimedios Radio

- XHLN-FM 104.9, Linares, Nuevo León
- XHTKR-FM 103.7, Monterrey, Nuevo León
- XHRCA-FM 102.7, Torreón, Coahuila

In alliance with Grupo Vox

- XHPQGA-FM 88.9, Quiroga, Michoacán
- XHPTAC-FM 94.5, Tacámbaro, Michoacán

In alliance with Grupo Radio Korita

- XHSK-FM 100.7, Ruiz, Nayarit
- XHERK-FM 104.9, Tepic, Nayarit

In alliance with Grupo Edikam

- XHPCMQ-FM 92.3, Cadereyta, Querétaro
- XHJAQ-FM 107.1, Jalpan, Querétaro

In alliance with Grupo Liberal del Sur

- XHNE-FM 100.1, Coatzacoalcos, Veracruz
- XHOM-FM 107.5, Coatzacoalcos, Veracruz

In alliance with Grupo MS Multimedios

- XHHU-FM 89.9, Martínez de la Torre, Veracruz
- XHEPT-FM 99.1, Misantla, Veracruz

In alliance with Quatro Media Telecomunicaciones

- XHDQ-FM 103.9, San Andrés Tuxtla, Veracruz
- XHGR-FM 104.1, Xalapa, Veracruz

In alliance with Sistema Radio Lobo

- XHARE-FM 97.7, Ojinaga, Chihuahua

In alliance with GRM Radio

- XHMDA-FM 104.9, Monclova, Coahuila

In alliance with Radio Grupo Antonio Contreras

- XHCN-FM 88.5, Irapuato, Guanajuato
- XHWE-FM 107.9, Irapuato, Guanajuato
- XEMAS-AM 1560, Salamanca, Guanajuato (repeater of XHWE-FM)

In alliance with Grupo Audiorama Comunicaciones

- XHERZ-FM 93.1, León, Guanajuato

In alliance with Radio Emisora Central

- XHLJ-FM 105.7, León, Guanajuato-Lagos de Moreno, Jalisco

In alliance with Radio Milenium Orbital

- XHQH-FM 106.7, Ixmiquilpan, Hidalgo

In alliance with

- XHCCBC-FM 91.9, Ciudad Hidalgo, Michoacán

In alliance with Alfonso Ibarra Valdés

- XHZTM-FM 89.1, Zitácuaro, Michoacán

In alliance with Grupo Mundo

- XHJMG-FM 96.5, Cuernavaca, Morelos
- XHTIX-FM 100.1, Cuernavaca, Morelos
- XHCMR-FM 105.3, Cuernavaca, Morelos

In alliance with Grupo ROJAZ

- XHPVTS-FM 98.5, Tututepec, Puebla

In alliance with Víctor Manuel Bautista Paulino

- XHLU-FM 93.5, Ciudad Serdán, Puebla

In alliance with Radio Nueva Generación

- XHENG-FM 97.5, Huauchinango, Puebla

In alliance with Grupo Hanan Comunicación.

- XHEPA-FM 89.7 and XEPA-AM 1010, Puebla, Puebla

In alliance with Tribuna Comunicación.

- XHPBA-FM 98.7, Puebla, Puebla

In alliance with Radio Teziutlán.

- XHFJ-FM 95.1, Teziutlán, Puebla

In alliance with Grupo Promomedios

- XHPGVS-FM 88.9, Guasave, Sinaloa
- XHERJ-FM 105.1, Mazatlán, Sinaloa

In alliance with RadioDual S.A. de C.V.

- XEEW-FM 97.7, Matamoros, Tamaulipas

In alliance with Radio La Veraz

- XHEVZ-FM 93.9, Acayucan, Veracruz

In alliance with ROGSA

- XHOV-FM 97.3, Orizaba, Veracruz

In alliance with Diego Arrazola Becerra

- XHHTY-FM 107.1, Tlapacoyan, Veracruz
