= XHABCA-FM =

Radio station in Mexicali, Baja California, Mexico

- Mexicali, Baja California; Mexico
- Frequency: 101.3 MHz (HD Radio)
- Branding: La Ke Buena

Programming
- Format: Regional Mexican
- Affiliations: Radiópolis

Ownership
- Owner: Grupo Radio Cañón; (Radio Cañón, S.A. de C.V.)
- Sister stations: XEMMM-AM, XHMOE-FM

History
- First air date: 1984
- Former call signs: XEYX-AM (1984–1997); XEMVS-AM (1997–2004); XEABCA-AM (2004–2024)
- Former frequencies: 1590 kHz (1984-1990s) 820 kHz (2004-2024)
- Call sign meaning: Derived from ABC Radio, former owner

Technical information
- Licensing authority: CRT
- Class: A
- ERP: 3 kW
- HAAT: 57.2 m (188 ft)

Links
- Webcast: Listen live
- Website: grupo-rc.mx

XHABCA-FM is a radio station on 101.3 FM in Mexicali, Baja California. It is owned by Grupo Radio Cañón and carries the La Ke Buena Regional Mexican format from Radiópolis.

== History ==
XEABCA-AM began on 1590 kHz in 1984, when a concession was awarded for XEYX-AM, owned by Mario Ignacio Meléndez Soto. Its first format was a Spanish-language tropical music format known as "La Gigante".

In 1997, the station was sold to MVS Radio and rechristened XEMVS-AM. The concessionaire name for this station, Stereorey Mexicali, was a big nod to MVS's Stereorey format; stations owned by MVS Radio have the concessionaire Stereorey México, S.A. In the 1990s, the station was also relocated from 1590 kHz to 820. During MVS ownership, the station affiliated to the La Mejor Regional Mexican national format, later becoming oldies-formatted Nostalgia 820 and Regional Mexican-formatted Radio Lobo.

In 2004, MVS sold the station to Organización Editorial Mexicana, which changed its calls to the current XEABCA-AM and brought its ABC Radio programming to Mexicali. OEM also bought XEMMM-AM 940 from Cadena Baja California.

After being approved in July 2017, XEABCA began its AM-FM migration in September 2020, signing on XHABCA-FM 101.3; the station formally added the FM on September 20. The station has since been subject to a continuity obligation to keep the AM operational in order to provide service to 11 people who receive no other radio stations. In March 2022, it was rebranded as Radio Cañón with no change in format.

On April 23, 2023, as part of a national alliance between the company and Radiópolis, 22 NTR-owned stations adopted franchise formats from Radiópolis. With the Los 40 Principales franchise already represented in Mexicali, XHABCA-FM switched to a Regional Mexican format under the La Ke Buena franchise.
