= XHWK-FM =

Radio station in Zapopan–Guadalajara, Jalisco

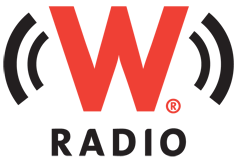
- Zapopan, Jalisco; Mexico
- Broadcast area: Guadalajara metropolitan area
- Frequency: 101.5 MHz (HD Radio)
- Branding: W Radio

Programming
- Format: Talk radio

Ownership
- Owner: Radiópolis; (Cadena Radiodifusora Mexicana, S.A. de C.V.)
- Sister stations: XEBA-FM, XEHL-FM, XELT-AM, XEZZ-AM

History
- First air date: October 28, 1954 (concession); March 27, 2020 (FM)
- Former call signs: XEWK-AM
- Former frequencies: 1190 kHz (1954–2021)

Technical information
- Licensing authority: CRT
- Class: A
- ERP: 3,000 watts
- HAAT: 331 meters (1,086 ft)
- Transmitter coordinates: 20°35′59.87″N 103°21′54.09″W

Links
- Webcast: Listen live
- Website: wradio.com.mx

XHWK-FM is a radio station on 101.5 FM in Zapopan service the greater Guadalajara, Jalisco, Mexico area. It began in 1954 as a rebroadcaster of XEW-AM.

== History ==
Cadena Radio Guadalajara, S.A., received the concession for XEWK-AM on 1190 kHz on October 28, 1954, though six months earlier on April 27, provisional transmissions had been authorized. The concessionaire was changed in 1994. The AM station operated 50 kilowatts during the day and 10 kilowatts at night on 1190 kHz from a transmitter at Atemajac del Valle, Zapopan, Jalisco.

In 2017, XEWK-AM was authorized for second-wave AM-FM migration on 101.5 MHz as XHWK-FM. The station signed on March 27, 2020, and came into official service days later; the AM was turned off at 11:59 p.m. on March 29, 2021.
