= List of radio stations in Mexico City =

This is a list of the CRT-licensed radio stations in Mexico City that are found on the AM, shortwave and FM bands. Some stations are licensed or have their transmitters in the State of Mexico but primarily serve Mexico City.

== AM stations in Mexico City ==
Frequency kHz	Station	Name	Transmitter site	Power kW	Operator
540 kHz	XEWF-AM	La Bestia Grupera	Tlalmanalco, Méx.	20 d / 2.5 n	Grupo Radiorama / Grupo Audiorama Comunicaciones
560 kHz	XEOC-AM	Radio Chapultepec	Francisco I. Madero, Miguel Hidalgo, CDMX	1.5 d / 0.5 n	Valanci Media Group
590 kHz	XEPH-AM	Sabrosita + 1410 AM	Barrio Santiago Sur, Iztacalco, CDMX	25 d / 10 n	NRM Comunicaciones
620 kHz	XENK-AM	Radio La Guadalupana ESNE	San Andrés de la Cañada, Ecatepec de Morelos, Méx.	50 d / 5 n	Cadena RASA / ESNE Radio
660 kHz	XEDTL-AM	Tropicalísima	San Lorenzo Tezonco, CDMX	50 d / 1 n	Instituto Mexicano de la Radio
690 kHz	XEN-AM	El Fonógrafo	Barrio San Miguel Teotongo, CDMX	100 d / 5 n	Grupo Radio Centro
710 kHz	XEMP-AM	Radio 710	El Vergel, CDMX	10 d / 1 n	Instituto Mexicano de la Radio
730 kHz	XEX-AM	W Deportes	Los Reyes Acaquilpan, Méx.	60	Radiópolis
760 kHz	XEABC-AM	Vox	San Sebastián Chimalpa, Méx.	70 d / 10 n	Grupo Radio Cañón / Radiópolis
790 kHz	XERC-AM	Off Air	Barrio San Miguel Teotongo, CDMX	50 d / 1 n	Grupo Radio Centro
830 kHz	XEITE-AM	Lokura 830 AM	Magdalena Atlazolpa, Iztapalapa, CDMX	25 d / 5 n	Capital Media
860 kHz	XEUN-AM	Radio UNAM 860 AM	Ticomán, CDMX	45 d / 10 n	Universidad Nacional Autónoma de México
900 kHz	XEW-AM	W Radio + 96.9 FM	Los Reyes Acaquilpan, Méx.	100	Radiópolis
940 kHz	XEQ-AM	La Ke Buena + 92.9 FM	Los Reyes Acaquilpan, Méx.	30	Radiópolis
970 kHz	XERFR-AM	Grupo Fórmula 970 AM	Aculco, CDMX	50 d / 4 n	Grupo Fórmula
1000 kHz	XEOY-AM	Stereo Cien + 100.1 FM	Barrio Santiago Sur, Iztacalco, CDMX	50 d / 20 n	NRM Comunicaciones
1030 kHz	XEQR-AM	Radio Centro 1030	Magdalena Atlazolpa, Iztapalapa, CDMX	50 d / 5 n	Grupo Radio Centro
1060 kHz	XECPAE-AM	Cultura 1060 AM	Ejército de Oriente, CDMX	100 d / 20 n	Secretaría de Cultura
1110 kHz	XERED-AM	Radio Red	El Vergel, CDMX	50 d / 50 n	Grupo Radio Centro
1150 kHz	XEJP-AM	Acustik Radio	Barrio San Miguel Teotongo, CDMX	20 d / 10 n	Grupo Acustik
1180 kHz	XEFR-AM	Radio Felicidad	Ciudad de la Radio, Isidro Fabela, CDMX	10 d / 5 n	Grupo ACIR
1220 kHz	XEB-AM	La B Grande	San Lorenzo Tezonco, CDMX	100	Instituto Mexicano de la Radio
1260 kHz	XEL-AM	XEL 1260 AM	Los Reyes Acaquilpan, Méx.	50 d / 5 n	Grupo Radio Cañón / Radiópolis
1320 kHz	XEARZ-AM	ZER Radio	Agricultura, CDMX	5 d / 5 n	Grupo Radiofónico ZER
1350 kHz	XEQK-AM	Luciérnagas 1350	El Vergel, CDMX	2.5 d / 1 n	Instituto Mexicano de la Radio
1380 kHz	XECO-AM	Romántica 1380	Barrio Zapotla, Iztacalco, CDMX	50 d / 5 n	Grupo Radiorama / Grupo Audiorama Comunicaciones
1410 kHz	XEBS-AM	Sabrosita + 590 AM	Barrio Santiago Sur, Iztacalco, CDMX	25 d / 10 n	NRM Comunicaciones
1440 kHz	XEEST-AM	Ondas de Vida	Magdalena Atlazolpa, Iztapalapa, CDMX	25 d / 1 n	Grupo Siete
1470 kHz	XEAI-AM	Grupo Fórmula 1470 AM	Aculco, CDMX	50 d / 5 n	Grupo Fórmula
1500 kHz	XEDF-AM	Grupo Fórmula 1500 AM	Granjas Esmeralda, CDMX	50 d / 5 n	Grupo Fórmula
1530 kHz	XEUR-AM	Buenísiima + 1590 AM	Barrio Zapotla, Iztacalco, CDMX	50 d / 1 n	Grupo Radiorama / Grupo Audiorama Comunicaciones
1590 kHz	XEVOZ-AM	Buenísiima + 1530 AM	Tultitlán, Méx.	20 d	Grupo Radiorama / Grupo Audiorama Comunicaciones
1650 kHz	XECPCM-AM	Radio Congreso	Ticomán, Gustavo A. Madero, CDMX	5 d	Congreso General de los Estados Unidos Mexicanos

== SW stations in Mexico City ==
Frequency kHz	Station	Name	Transmitter site	Power kW	Operator
6.185 MHz	XEPPM-OC	Radio Educación Onda Corta	Ejército de Oriente, CDMX	10	Secretaría de Cultura

== FM stations in Mexico City ==
Frequency MHz	Station	Name	Subchannels Radio Digital IBOC	Transmitter site	Power kW	Operator
88.1 MHz	XHRED-FM	Universal 88.1	88.1 HD1-Universal 88.1	Villa Alpina, Naucalpan de Juárez, Méx.	95.12	Grupo Radio Centro
88.9 MHz	XHM-FM	88.9 Noticias	—N/a	Ciudad de la Radio, Isidro Fabela, CDMX	90.00	Grupo ACIR
89.7 MHz	XEOYE-FM	Oye 89 7	—N/a	Cerro del Chiquihuite	100.00	NRM Comunicaciones
90.5 MHz	XEDA-FM	Imagen Radio	90.5 HD1-Imagen Radio; 90.5 HD2-RMX Radio; 90.5 HD3-La Kaliente	Cerro del Chiquihuite	100.00	Grupo Imagen
90.9 MHz	XHUIA-FM	Ibero 90.9	90.9 HD1-Ibero 90.9; 90.9 HD2-Ibero.2	Santa Fe	10.00	Universidad Iberoamericana
91.3 MHz	XHFAJ-FM	Alfa 91.3	91.3 HD1-Alfa 91.3	Villa Alpina, Naucalpan de Juárez, Méx.	99.45	Grupo Radio Centro
92.1 MHz	XHFO-FM	Radio Disney	92.1 HD1-Radio Disney	World Trade Center Mexico City	100.00	Grupo Siete
92.9 MHz	XEQ-FM	La Ke Buena + 940 AM	—N/a	World Trade Center Mexico City	79.07	Radiópolis
93.7 MHz	XEJP-FM	Joya 93.7	93.7 HD1-Joya 93.7	Villa Alpina, Naucalpan de Juárez, Méx.	98.10	Grupo Radio Centro
94.1 MHz	XHUAM-FM	UAM Radio	—N/a	UAM Cuajimalpa	3.00	Universidad Autónoma Metropolitana
94.5 MHz	XHIMER-FM	Opus 94	—N/a	Ajusco	100.00	Instituto Mexicano de la Radio
95.3 MHz	XHSH-FM	Amor	—N/a	Ciudad de la Radio, Isidro Fabela, CDMX	90.00	Grupo ACIR
95.7 MHz	XHIPN-FM	Radio IPN	95.7 HD1-Radio IPN; 95.7 HD2-Polifonía; 95.7 HD3-Polimanía	Cerro del Chiquihuite	2.0	Instituto Politécnico Nacional
96.1 MHz	XEUN-FM	Radio UNAM 96.1 FM	—N/a	Ajusco	100.00	Universidad Nacional Autónoma de México
96.5 MHz	XHEP-FM	Cultura 96.5 FM	96.5 HD1-Cultura 96.5 FM	Ángel Urraza 622, CDMX	6.00	Secretaría de Cultura
96.9 MHz	XEW-FM	W Radio + 900 AM	—N/a	World Trade Center Mexico City	51.19	Radiópolis
97.7 MHz	XERC-FM	La Mejor FM	97.7 HD1-La Mejor FM	Cerro del Chiquihuite	99.71	MVS Radio
98.5 MHz	XHDL-FM	El Heraldo Radio	98.5 HD1-El Heraldo Radio; 98.5 HD2-El Heraldo Radio HD2	Cerro de Ticoman	100.00	Heraldo Media Group
99.3 MHz	XHPOP-FM	Match	—N/a	Ciudad de la Radio, Isidro Fabela, CDMX	90.00	Grupo ACIR
100.1 MHz	XHMM-FM	Stereo Cien + 1000 AM	—N/a	Cerro del Chiquihuite	100.00	NRM Comunicaciones
100.9 MHz	XHSON-FM	Beat 100.9	—N/a	Cerro del Chiquihuite	100.00	NRM Comunicaciones
101.7 MHz	XEX-FM	Los 40	—N/a	World Trade Center Mexico City	51.19	Radiópolis
102.5 MHz	XHMVS-FM	MVS 102.5	—N/a	Cerro del Chiquihuite	80.26	MVS Radio
103.3 MHz	XERFR-FM	Grupo Fórmula 103.3 FM	103.3 HD1-Grupo Fórmula 103.3 FM	Torre Latinoamericana	58.13	Grupo Fórmula
104.1 MHz	XEDF-FM	Grupo Fórmula 104.1 FM	104.1 HD1-Grupo Fórmula 104.1 FM	Torre Latinoamericana	58.138	Grupo Fórmula
104.9 MHz	XHEXA-FM	Exa FM	—N/a	Cerro del Chiquihuite	89.40	MVS Radio
105.3 MHz	XHINFO-FM	Chilango Radio	105.3 HD1-Chilango Radio	Calle 10 #11, Col. San Pedro de los Pinos, CDMX	2.00	Eduardo Henkel Rojas / Capital Digital
105.7 MHz	XHOF-FM	Reactor	—N/a	Ajusco	36.08	Instituto Mexicano de la Radio
106.5 MHz	XHDFM-FM	Mix	—N/a	Ciudad de la Radio, Isidro Fabela, CDMX	90.00	Grupo ACIR
106.9 MHz	XHSCCA-FM	Frecuencia	—N/a	Xochimilco	1.15	Comunicadores Comunitarios del Arte y la Cultura, A.C.
107.3 MHz	XEQR-FM	La Z	107.3 HD1-La Z 107.3 HD2-Radio Centro 1030	Villa Alpina, Naucalpan de Juárez, Méx.	92.32	Grupo Radio Centro
107.9 MHz	XHIMR-FM	Horizonte	—N/a	Ajusco	30.00	Instituto Mexicano de la Radio

== Defunct stations ==
- XEDA-AM 1290
- XENET-AM 1320
- XERTA-OC 4800 (shortwave)
- XEOI-OC 6010 (shortwave)
- XETT-OC 9555 (shortwave)
- XEYU-OC 9600 (shortwave) (to 2017)
- XERMX-OC
- XHCDMX-FM 106.1 (2019–2024)
