= Radio in Mexico =

Radio in Mexico is a mass medium with 98 percent national penetration and a wider diversity of owners and programming than on television. In a model similar to that of radio in the United States, Mexican radio in its history has been largely commercial, but with a strong state presence and a rising number of noncommercial stations in the 2000s and early 2010s. In August 2015, there were 1,999 legal radio stations, almost 75 percent of them on the FM band.

== History ==
=== The 1920s: Pioneers and establishment ===
Radio was not invented in Mexico, declares PhD Elizabeth Rodríguez Montiel. The first transmission of the First Radio Station in Mexico was on October 9, 1921, in the city of Monterrey, Nuevo Leon, Mexico. The Electrical Engineer Constantino de Tarnava who previously had made experimental transmissions since 1919 made the first Broadcast service in Mexico under the call sign TND. He himself announced this indicative in order to honor the University of Notre Dame in Indiana. Tarnava Notre Dame got in 1929 the call signs XEH and this radio station operates until today (2021).

Besides this fact, the development of Mexican radio would take place simultaneously in various cities around the country, as opposed to the rather centralized, Mexico City-based development of television. One of the first radio transmissions (not Broadcast Service but radio telephone and radiotelegraph stations) it seems to be taken in 1921 as well. This as part of celebrations of the centennial of the signing of the Treaty of Córdoba, which formalized Mexican independence. On September 27, 1921, during the Centennial International Commercial Exposition in Mexico City, a small radio station (telephone station) was set up by the government and run by Agustín Flores, an inspector in the General Directorate of Telegraphy. That same night, the Gómez Fernández brothers mounted their first radio transmissions, also in Mexico City; their station, with 20 watts power, would operate until January 1922, with programs of one hour on Saturday and Sunday.

As written before, Constantino de Tárnava, a ham radio operator in Monterrey, Nuevo León, began in October 9, 1921, regular transmissions of a station he called TND (Tárnava Notre Dame); de Tárnava would later own XEH-AM, one of Nuevo León's first licensed radio stations. The next year, radio stations would begin operations in Mexico City, Pachuca, Cuernavaca, Guadalajara, Morelia, San Luis Potosí, Chihuahua, Chihuahua, and Ciudad Juárez. Also in 1922, the National Radio League (Liga Nacional de Radio), the first radio association in Mexico, was formed.

On May 8, 1923, the station "El Universal/La Casa del Radio" (later CYL) came to air in Mexico City with 50 watts of power. The station was co-owned by the El Universal newspaper and Raúl Azcárraga, owner of the La Casa del Radio chain of radio stores. Andrés Segovia and Manuel Ponce were among the luminaries present at the station's formal inauguration that evening. That September, the station would increase its power to 500 watts; it would leave the air in 1928.

On September 15, the "El Buen Tono" cigarette company began the operation of its own station. This station would receive the CYB callsign after Mexico was assigned a range of international callsigns in 1924, and upon the switch of Mexico's callsign assignments to "X" in 1929, it would become XEB, the oldest Mexican radio station still in operation today. 1924 also saw the launch of radio stations by the Excélsior newspaper (CYX) and the Secretariat of Public Education (CZE, later XFX). The latter station, on 560 kHz, would operate until 1929, and the SEP would not operate another radio station until the 1960s.

The first communications law, the Electric Communications Law, was promulgated in 1926 by President Plutarco Elías Calles. Article 12 of the law provided that radio programming "should not harm the security of the State" or "the established government".

In 1929, callsigns were reassigned again. Mexico received the range XAA to XPZ; callsigns beginning in XE would be used for broadcasting. In the 1940s, the XH callsign series would be used for new FM and TV stations, though certain stations of both types that were co-owned with existing AM stations were allowed to use XE calls (such as XEWV-FM in Mexicali or XET-TV in Monterrey).

Radio stations in 1927

Early radio stations	Location	Start	Owner
TND (later: CYO, CYH, XEH)	Monterrey	1921	Constantino de Tárnava
CYL	Mexico City	1923	Raúl Azcárraga Vidaurreta (El Universal)
CYB (later: XEB)	Mexico City	1923	José J. Reynosa
CYF (later: XEF)	Oaxaca	1923	Federico Zonilla
CYY (later: XEY)	Mérida	1923	Socialist Party
CZF (later: XFF)	Chihuahua	1923	State of Chihuahua
CYX (later: XEX)	Mexico City	1924	El Excélsior
CZE (later: XFX)	Mexico City	1924	Ministry of Public Education
CYS (later: XEN)	Mexico City	1925	General Electric Co.
XEW	Mexico City	1930	Emilio Azcárraga Vidaurreta
XEFO	Mexico City	1930	Partido Nacional Revolucionario

=== 1930s: Consolidation of Mexican radio ===
The 1930s saw the development of many new radio stations in Mexico. XEN (then on 710 kHz), Radio Mundial, provided the Mexico City area with the world's first all-news radio station in 1930. But the most important new radio station in 1930 was XEW 900, owned by Emilio Azcárraga Vidaurreta. Known as the "Voice of Latin America", XEW marked the changing of a guard in Mexican radio development and the beginning of its consolidation as a viable business. It specialized in developing daily programming that attracted viewers, and thus advertisers. Azcárraga's empire grew with the sign-on of XEQ in 1938.

The National Revolutionary Party, predecessor to the Institutional Revolutionary Party, launched station XEFO (originally known as "XE-PNR") 940 kHz in Mexico City on January 1, 1931. The station served as a method of disseminating party ideology and propaganda and was the primary news and propaganda source for the party during the 1934 presidential elections that brought Lázaro Cárdenas into power. The station was sold in 1941 and was succeeded by two separate outlets: XEQR on 1030, owned by Francisco Aguirre Jiménez, and XERCN 1110, owned by Rafael Cutberto Navarro and his Radio Cadena Nacional.

In 1931, the regime of permits for broadcast stations was changed to one where the government awarded concessions to use and operate stations on the radio spectrum, considered a public good ultimately owned by the state. Concessions awarded to stations were valid for up to 50 years. Likewise, in 1933, the government established a limit of 10 percent of broadcast time dedicated to commercial announcements, as well as the ability for the government to broadcast messages over commercial radio stations.

In 1937, this latter feature of Mexican radio would produce La Hora Nacional, one of the world's oldest continuously-aired radio programs, which is broadcast at 10 pm Sunday nights on all Mexican radio stations. La Hora Nacional was produced by the new Autonomous Dependency for Press and Publicity (DAPP), which built station XEDP on AM and shortwave counterpart XEXA but disappeared in 1939 with its stations to languish with little government support until the early 1940s. In 1969, the government set a quota of 12.5 percent of the airtime of all broadcast stations to be allotted for its uses.

In 1937, the Mexican Association of Radio Broadcasters was formed as the first industry association; soon renamed to the Mexican Association of Commercial Radio Broadcasters (AMERC, Asociación Mexicana de Radiodifusoras Comerciales), it initially consisted of 20 radio stations, half of them in Mexico City.

The 1930s also saw the development of the first border blasters, stations that took advantage of Mexico's higher power limits and looser regulatory requirements for AM radio stations and boomed their signals toward the United States, often with paid preaching programs. The original border blaster, John Brinkley's XER in Villa Acuña, Coahuila, was replaced with XERA in 1935. XERA broadcast at 500 kilowatts and operated until 1939, when it was shut down amidst a treaty with the United States. Also in the decade, the first university broadcasters came into operation: XEUN, the station of the Universidad Nacional Autónoma de México, and XEXQ, operated by the Universidad Autónoma de San Luis Potosí.

=== 1940s: Networking ===
1940 saw a further pioneering effort in radio. Station XEQK in Mexico City, which had struggled since signing on in 1938, began transmitting the time, every minute on the minute, interspersed with short commercial announcements. The transmissions were enough of a success, both in terms of audience and advertising money, that the station dropped its other programs in 1942. "La QK", as it was popularly known, quickly became renowned for its distinctive "Hora Exacta" time format; it would be sold to IMER in 1983, and the format would remain on the air until 2003.

In 1941, the foundation of Radio Programas de México, half-controlled by the Azcárraga family and Clemente Serna Martínez, marked the beginning of a networking frenzy in Mexico. Stations in interior Mexico not only received access to better programming produced in Mexico City and recorded on vinyl and magnetic tape but also to national advertisers. Within a decade, RPM had 92 affiliates, forming a network that at its height included more than half of the country's radio stations. Regional and semi-national networks included Radiodifusoras Asociadas, S.A. (RASA), which mostly had stations in the Bajío region, and Radio Central Radiofónica, with its affiliate portfolio located in central Mexico.

Also in 1941, the Cámara Nacional de la Industria de Radiodifusión, or CIR, was founded as a chamber of commerce for the radio industry. In the early 1970s, it expanded its focus to include television and changed its name to the Cámara Nacional de la Industria de Radio y Televisión (CIRT).

In 1947, XERF-AM was founded in Villa Acuña, which would begin a new generation of border blaster radio stations including XERB and XETRA in Tijuana, Baja California. While border blasters usually programmed in English, they had to meet the requirements of their Mexican concessions, including broadcast of La Hora Nacional and the Mexican national anthem. That same year, the government renewed its radio efforts with the launch of XEX 730 in Mexico City, a 500,000-watt radio station which used the equipment of the former XERA in Villa Acuña and was intended as a national-level radio station.

=== 1950s: Recorded music, the beginnings of FM and the expansion of AM ===
The 1950s saw development on all frequencies. While the number of stations on the whole grew from 201 in 1951 to 332 in 1959, almost all on AM, the 1950s were a decade where Mexico began its forays into television and FM radio. The first television station in Mexico, XHTV in Mexico City, signed on August 31, 1950; two years later, the capital city saw the birth of the nation's first FM radio station, XHFM. XHFM, known as "Radio Joya", would close in 1957 after its studios were severely damaged in an earthquake. However, FM stations were slowly beginning to appear across the country: XEOY-FM and XERPM-FM in Mexico City and XET-FM in Monterrey were all on air by the end of the decade, and there would be 49 FM stations across the country for 1969.

On the AM band, which still represented the vast majority of radio stations, listeners and advertisers, live programming was steadily supplanted by recorded music. Smaller stations with fewer resources to produce live programming are among the first to convert, though broadcasters in all markets quickly find out that playing recordings dramatically lowered their stations' overhead. Meanwhile, more networks sprung up, and in some cases, smaller stations ceded their operation rights to the networks, who came to control dozens of radio stations across the country. This transformation was key in the development of large radio groups.

At the same time, however, there was tension between radio stations in Mexico City and those in the nation's interior. The networks began to install repetidoras (repeaters) of their programming; XEW, for instance, established such stations in San Luis Potosí, Monterrey, Veracruz, Oaxaca and Guadalajara, among other cities. These stations, which merely served to rebroadcast programming entirely produced in the capital, were seen as a serious threat by the regional broadcasters, who banded together to form the Coordinating Committee of Broadcasters in the States (CCRE).

The 1950s and 1960s also saw the least radio activity on behalf of the government. With the closure of the SEP's radio stations, only Radio UNAM and XEJB, the radio station of the state government of Jalisco, were on the air. The number of new radio stations served as important cultural links between Mexico's urban centers and its many rural villages; one 1954 summary of radio in interior Mexico noted that "radio is certainly one of the instruments of integration in Mexico."

=== 1960s: Stereo FM and new radio groups ===
1960 saw the promulgation of a new Federal Radio and Television Law, which divided broadcasting stations into two categories; concessions, which were commercial stations with the ability to broadcast advertising, and permits, which were noncommercial and awarded to nonprofit entities. The law, which remained in effect with modifications for 54 years, also forced stations to get approval from the SCT to program in foreign languages.

In 1965, the first locally owned, cultural radio station, XEYT in Teocelo, Veracruz (now XEYTM-AM), came to air under the auspices of the Centro de Promoción Social y Cultural, A.C. In the same state, in Huayacocotla, shortwave station and radio school XEJN-OC took to air with literacy programming broadcast to literacy centers throughout the station's broadcast area; after 35 years, its transmissions would move to FM, with the station becoming XHFCE-FM.

In 1967, Joaquín Vargas Gómez, who had visited the United States and was impressed with its FM stereo stations, worked to bring the system to Mexico. He founded Stereorey, a network of stereo FM stations with a beautiful music format; among the most important stations in the network were XHSRO-FM 92.5 in Monterrey and XHV-FM 102.5 in Mexico City. Stereorey eventually became the cornerstone of a larger media empire, known as MVS Comunicaciones, which also included other radio stations and pay television systems. The 1960s also saw the foundation of Grupo ACIR and Radio Fórmula, two of the country's largest radio groups; Grupo Radiorama would follow in the early 1970s.

=== The expansion of public radio ===
1968 saw the return of the Secretariat of Public Education to radio for the first time since the 1940s with the sign-on of XEEP-AM 1060 "Radio Educación". However, it came to air with subpar and antiquated equipment, a program schedule that included a break of several hours in the middle of the day, and a small staff. It was not until the government of Luis Echeverría in 1972 that Radio Educación would receive new facilities, upgraded equipment and an expanded budget.

In 1976, Radio Fórmula entered into financial difficulties; two years later, it sold three of its seven stations to the federal government. The government's acquisition of XEB-AM, XEMP-AM and XERPM-AM led to the creation of a group within the General Directorate of Radio, Television and Film (RTC) of SEGOB. When the Instituto Mexicano de la Radio was created in 1983, uniting the radio stations operated by various government dependencies into one agency, this trio of AM radio stations served as its core.

1979 saw the launch of a new variety of AM radio station. XEZV-AM came to air in Tlapa de Comonfort, Guerrero, operated by the National Indigenist Institute. "The Voice of the Mountains" was part of an initiative to promote educational and social development in indigenous regions of Mexico. In 1982, four more stations were launched; today, the INI's successor, the CDI, operates the Sistema de Radiodifusoras Culturales Indigenistas composed of 15 medium-wave radio services and several experimental FM radio stations broadcasting in 31 languages.

=== The rise of FM ===
By 1970, the FM band was still underdeveloped due to the high prices for FM receivers. In order to develop FM, the Association of FM Broadcasters was formed that year to promote lower prices for FM receivers and increased advertiser interest. Its membership consisted of Vargas Gómez and representatives for XEW-FM, Núcleo Radio Mil and Radio Imagen, which owned two Mexico City FMs. They succeeded in expanding the reach of the FM band; there were 174 FM stations in 1980, more than double the 65 on the air in 1970.

In 1980, AM radio stations captured 77 percent of the Mexican radio audience. However, in the five years that followed, the tables turned in favor of FM, which had a 64.9 percent market share as opposed to AM's 35.1 percent. The FM band's stereo capabilities and the increased prevalence of portable radios with improved sound quality would lead to the development of AM as a specialized talk radio band, with music radio stations migrating to FM.

In 1996, the Federal Telecommunications Commission (COFETEL) was created to replace many of the regulatory functions of the SCT in the telecommunications sector. However, the SCT continued issuing concessions and permits until 2006, when it began exercising control over broadcasting.

In 2000, Grupo ACIR announced its intention to merge with Radiópolis (now Televisa Radio), the radio division of Televisa, with the latter taking a 27.8 percent stake in ACIR. However, this was shot down by antitrust authorities, who expressed concern that the combination of ACIR and Televisa would squeeze smaller competitors out of the advertising market.

=== The AM-FM migration ===
The precursor to the AM-FM migration of 2008 came in 1994, when the CIRT successfully lobbied for the government to award FM frequencies to 80 am stations across the country, turning them into combo stations. However, by 2003, the Mexican radio industry was still dominated by AM radio stations, with 855 compared to 628 FM stations.

In 2008, the government of Felipe Calderón announced a scheme to move as many AM radio stations as possible to the FM band, in order to increase broadcast quality for listeners and permit the widespread development of future radio technologies on the FM band. Hundreds of stations, mostly outside of the largest metropolitan areas, either moved to FM after a year of AM-FM simulcasting or became AM and FM combo radio stations. Most AM stations that did not migrate were stations serving indigenous communities, in large metropolitan areas or border regions where there was no room to migrate stations, or stations that were forced to become AM-FM combos in order to guarantee the continuity of radio service in parts of their coverage areas.

However, even in the largest of markets, the decline of AM radio is such that some stations are no longer economically viable. XEDA-AM in Mexico City signed off in May 2015 after seeing listenership, commercial advertising income and federal government advertising all drop; its owner stated that "there's no market for AM".

After initially authorizing it for stations within 320 kilometers of the United States-Mexico border in 2008, Cofetel adopted the HD Radio standard, as used in the United States, for digital radio transmissions nationwide in 2011. Several large broadcasters, such as IMER, Radio Centro and Radio Fórmula, have equipped stations with HD Radio. In the 1990s, Mexico experimented with digital audio broadcasting (DAB) technology; adoption of it, however, was never attempted as a group of radio station owners in northern Mexico, concerned about the United States' decision to not use DAB and worried that they would lose access to US audiences, lobbied the CIRT to not take action.

The 2000s were marked by an increase in the number of new noncommercial radio stations, such as those awarded to state governments and universities, as well as the first licensed community radio stations in decades. This largely occurred because there were no new commercial radio stations put out for bid between 1995 and 2015. In 2003, 88% of Mexican radio stations were commercial; that figure was 75% for 2015.

=== 2010s: Broadcasting reform, a radio station auction and more station migrations ===
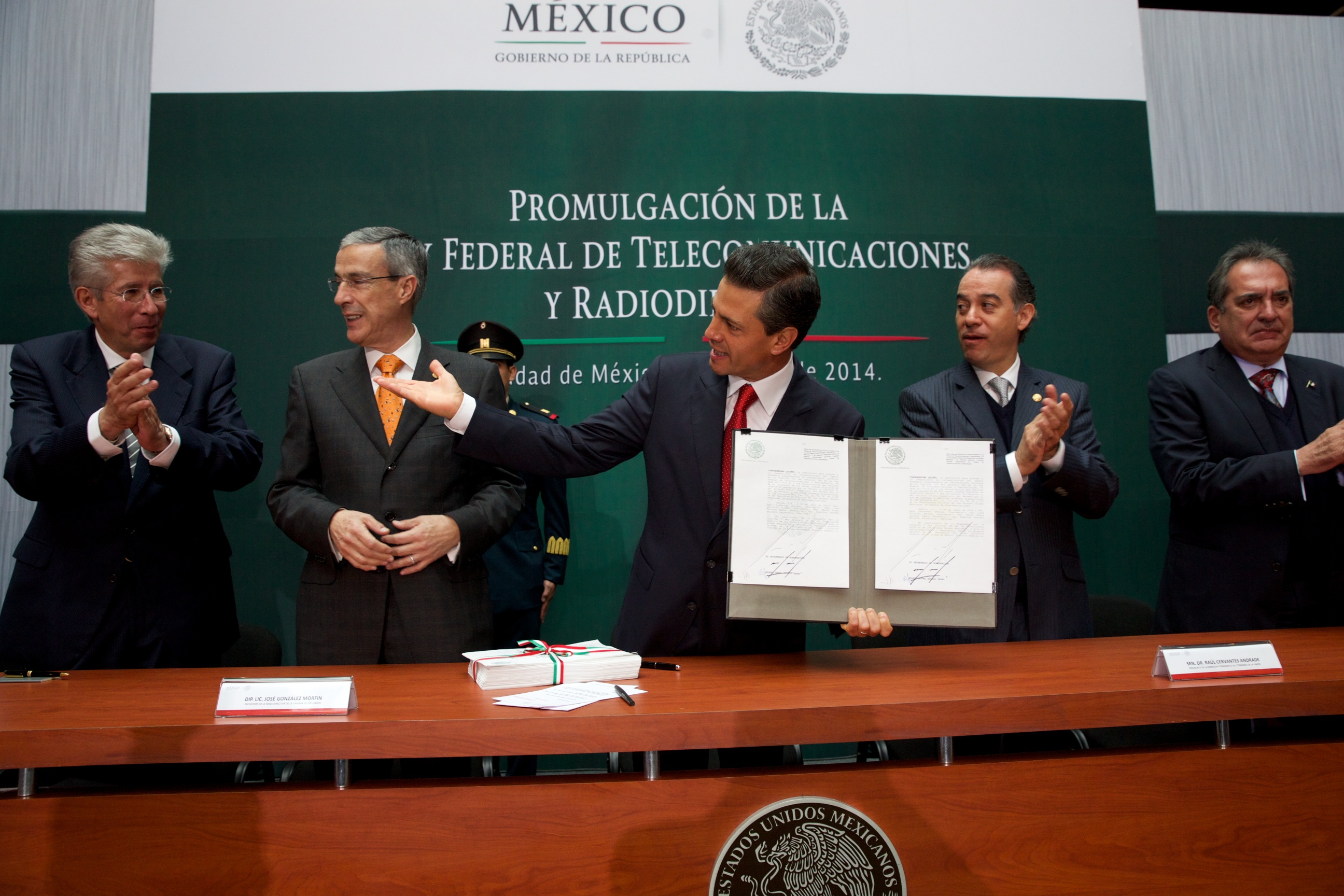
The Ley Federal de Telecomunicaciones y Radiodifusión (Federal Broadcasting and Telecommunications Act), promulgated by President Enrique Peña Nieto in 2014, recognized community and indigenous stations as separate classes for the first time.

In 2013 and 2014, as part of the reforms of the Pacto por México, constitutional reform and a new telecommunications and broadcasting law were passed. The reforms created a new and more autonomous broadcasting regulator, the Federal Telecommunications Institute, and also replaced the concession/permit system with a three-tiered classification of station concessions, consisting of commercial use, public use, and social use tiers. The social use tier further includes subcategories for community and indigenous radio stations, for which the 106-108 MHz sub-band is reserved moving forward. By May 2018, nearly four years after the passage of the Ley Federal de Telecomunicaciones y Radiodifusión, the IFT had awarded concessions to 50 community and 7 indigenous stations.

Equally significant was the IFT-4 radio station auction, the first of its kind, which took place in early 2017. The auction originally sought to award 255 frequencies (191 FM and 66 am) nationwide, but due to lack of interest in some areas and the presence of a controversial bidder (Tecnoradio) inflating prices for some stations, only 141 stations, including 114 FM and 27 AMs, were awarded in the auction, the first new commercial stations in more than 20 years.

A technical change made in 2016 reduced mandatory station spacing on FM from 800 to 400 kHz, which immediately opened the door to a number of new stations in major cities. A total of 41 stations in major cities and border areas, almost all commercial, were allowed to move to FM in 2017; in Mexico City, this included a long-desired FM frequency for Radio Educación and an essentially new station, XHINFO-FM "Aire Libre". Additionally, a frequency made available by the move to 400 kHz was awarded to be Mexico City's first community station, XHCDMX-FM "Violeta Radio".

== Commercial radio ==
1,452, or 72%, of Mexico's 1,999 licensed radio stations are commercial. Commercial radio in Mexico is largely owned at the regional or national level. Five large radio groups dominate the Mexican radio landscape: Grupo Radio Centro, Grupo ACIR, MVS Radio, Radio Fórmula, Radiorama and Televisa Radio, with a variety of local and regional broadcasters as well. Mid-size groups include NRM Comunicaciones, Grupo Imagen, and the government's Instituto Mexicano de la Radio. These groups either own large amounts of stations, form regional alliances with broadcasters, or have large syndication and advertising networks. Some analysts consider Mexico's radio markets to be oligarchical, with the vast majority of audiences and advertising revenue concentrated in few hands. Many commercial radio formats are national, with networks formed by owned-and-operated and affiliated stations; for instance, MVS Radio owns the Exa FM, La Mejor and FM Globo formats, carried by a mix of MVS Radio-owned stations and local affiliates in various cities.

== Noncommercial radio ==
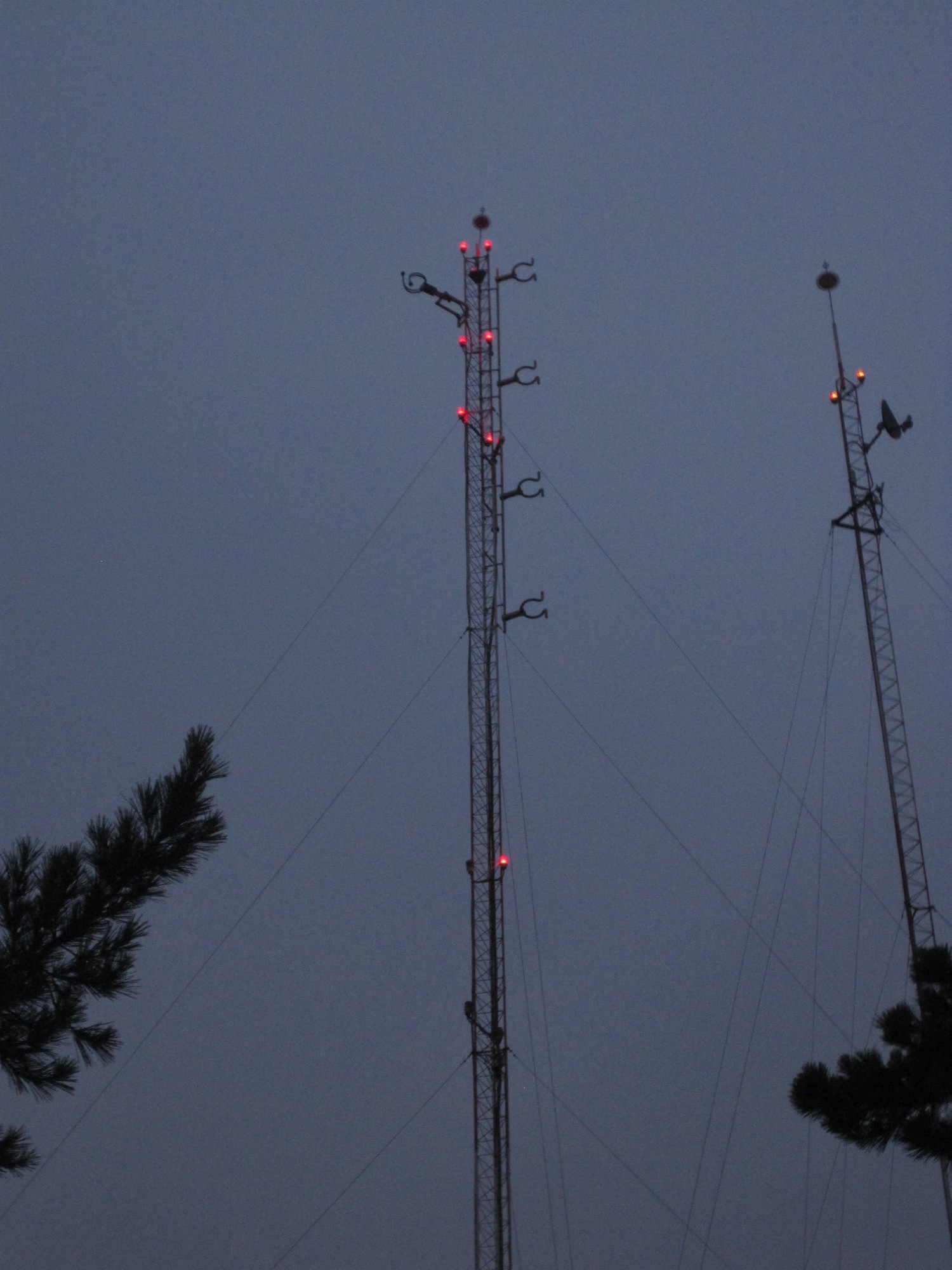
The tower for XHUPC-FM, the radio station of the Instituto Politécnico Nacional

Mexican law divides noncommercial radio station concessions into four types: public, social, social community and social indigenous. These distinctions replaced permits with the Federal Telecommunications and Broadcasting Law, passed in 2014.

=== Public radio ===
Public radio is more prevalent in Mexico than in the United States, and governments at various levels and other public institutions have made significant forays into the radio space. The federal government owns radio stations through the Instituto Mexicano de la Radio (IMER), the SRCI stations (see below), and the Secretariat of Public Education and its Radio Educación on AM and shortwave. Many state governments operate radio stations or even statewide radio networks. The most extensive is CORTV in the state of Oaxaca, with a network of 32 transmitters plus a 33rd station in Oaxaca, Oaxaca, while some radio services, such as XHZH-FM Radio Zacatecas, are one-station. Additionally, there are some municipally owned radio stations, the largest being XHCUN-FM in Cancún.

Public radio services are constrained by small budgets. In 2010, Radio France International received a budget of 576 million euros, while IMER received the equivalent of 8 million euros.

=== University radio ===
The first university radio station was Radio UNAM, which broadcast originally on AM, shortwave and FM in Mexico City. It was soon followed by XEXQ, the AM station of the Universidad Autónoma de San Luis Potosí. While the first university radio stations were on AM, as part of the AM-FM migration and also due to the general growth of noncommercial radio stations in Mexico, many universities have expanded to include FM radio stations. In some cases, such as the Universidad de Guadalajara and Universidad de Sonora systems, the stations have become radio networks with expanded coverage and even local optouts.

Private universities also own radio stations, which hold social concessions; the Universidad Autónoma de Durango's Lobos FM network of seven stations, Universidad Vasco de Quiroga and Monterrey Institute of Technology and Higher Education (XHTEC-FM) are examples of privately owned university radio stations.

=== Indigenous radio ===
The government-owned Sistema de Radiodifusoras Culturales Indigenistas (System of Indigenous Cultural Broadcasters) owns and operates some 25 AM and FM services offering programming in 31 indigenous languages; the first of these was launched in 1979. Each station is locally staffed by between 8 and 12 people. The stations offer local programs and public service material and are often the only radio stations with indigenous programming in their respective communities.

The LFTR in 2014 opened the door to indigenous radio stations owned directly by the indigenous communities; as of May 2018, seven indigenous radio stations have been awarded or created as a result of transitions from preexisting permits.

=== Community radio ===
Community radio was slow to develop in Mexico. During the 1999 UNAM strike, a pirate radio station called La Ke Huelga, still in operation, served as the launching pad for people that would later be involved in a variety of community radio stations, including XHCD-FM in Hermosillo and XHECA-FM in Amecameca, Estado de México. Some community radio stations were established to serve remote areas, like XHHCC-FM; others broadcast in indigenous languages, as is the case for XHBAK-FM. The development of community radio in Mexico has been limited due to harassment by the authorities, crackdowns on pirate radio stations, and the red tape involved in obtaining a permit. The Mexican branch of the World Association of Community Radio Broadcasters, AMARC México, did not manage to obtain permits for community radio stations until 2005; until then, Radio Teocelo was the only permitted community radio station in Mexico.

=== Noncommercial stations owned by commercial radio groups ===
Some noncommercial stations are related to commercial radio groups. The largest operator of such stations is Grupo Radiofónico ZER, which holds permits for noncommercial radio stations in the Bajío region and in Mexico City.

== See also ==
- List of newspapers in Mexico
