= XESTN-AM =

Radio station in Monterrey, Nuevo León

- Monterrey, Nuevo León; Mexico
- Frequency: 1540 AM
- Branding: Universal

Programming
- Format: News/talk, contemporary music in English

Ownership
- Owner: Grupo Radio Centro; (Radio Red, S.A. de C.V.)
- Sister stations: XHQQ-FM, XEH-AM

History
- First air date: 1988
- Call sign meaning: Santa Catarina"

Technical information
- Licensing authority: CRT
- Class: B
- Power: 5 kWs day 0.5 kWs night
- Transmitter coordinates: 25°40′06.9″N 100°18′44.4″W

Links
- Webcast: Listen live
- Website: laoctava.com universal881.com

XESTN-AM (1540 AM, "Universal") is a Spanish-language radio station in Monterrey, Nuevo León, Mexico. It relays programming from XHRED-FM 88.1 in Mexico City. 1540 AM is a United States clear-channel frequency.

== History ==
Logo used as "Radio Red Monterrey" through January 2019

The first concession for XESTN was awarded on November 29, 1988, to Jesús D. González González of Grupo Multimedios. The station was originally daytime-only and licensed to Santa Catarina. It was transferred in 2000 to Radio Red, S.A. de C.V., though Radio Red programs had been airing on XESTN since at least 1994. In 2009, the station increased its daytime power to 5,000 watts.

On January 14, 2019, concurrent with a major reshuffling and the relaunch of XERC-FM Mexico City as talk station "Radio Centro 97.7", XESTN and XEDKR-AM Guadalajara began simulcasting that station instead of Radio Red.

As part of the launch of Radio Centro's TV station, XHFAMX-TDT, on October 31, 2019, Universal moved to XERC-FM and all the talk programming moved back to XHRED-FM, which took the same "La Octava", XEDKR-AM and XESTN-AM Monterrey began simulcasting that station.
