= XEDKR-AM =

Radio station in Guadalajara, Jalisco

- Tonalá, Jalisco; Mexico
- Broadcast area: Guadalajara
- Frequency: 700 (kHz)
- Branding: Universal

Programming
- Format: News/talk, contemporary music in English

Ownership
- Owner: Grupo Radio Centro; (XEDKR-AM, S.A. de C.V.)

History
- First air date: 1953
- Call sign meaning: XEDK Radio

Technical information
- Licensing authority: CRT
- Class: B
- Power: 10 kW day 0.15 kW night
- Transmitter coordinates: 20°38′48″N 103°13′28″W

Links
- Webcast: Listen live
- Website: laoctava.com universal881.com

XEDKR-AM (700 AM, "Universal") is a Spanish-language radio station in Guadalajara. It relays programming from XHRED-FM 88.1 in Mexico City. 700 kHz is a United States clear-channel frequency.

== History ==
Logo used as Radio Red until January 2019

The first concession for 700 AM in Zapopan was awarded on October 17, 1953, for XEAR-AM and awarded to J. de Jesús Franco Gómez. By the 1960s, the station was transferred to Asociación Radiofónica, S.A., and sometime between 1969 and 1974, the callsign was changed to the present XEDKR-AM as a result of its acquisition by Radio Grupo DK (the Guadalajara arm of Radio Programas de México). It was known as Radio Ambiente in the early 1970s and by the late 1980s had become a direct repeater of Radio Red. It was transferred in 1991 to XEDKR-AM, S.A. de C.V., and sold along with the rest of RPM to Grupo Radio Centro in 1995.

On January 14, 2019, concurrent with a major reshuffling and the relaunch of XERC-FM Mexico City as talk station "Radio Centro 97.7", XEDKR and XESTN-AM Monterrey began simulcasting that station instead of Radio Red.

As part of the launch of Radio Centro's TV station, XHFAMX-TDT, on October 31, 2019, Universal moved to XERC-FM and all the talk programming moved back to XHRED, which took the same "La Octava", XEDKR and XESTN-AM Monterrey began simulcasting that station.
