= XEAA-AM =

Radio station in Mexicali, Baja California

Defunct
- Mexicali, Baja California; Mexico
- Frequency: 1340 kHz

Ownership
- Owner: Grupo Radio Centro; (Grupo Radiodigital Siglo XXI, S.A. de C.V.)

History
- First air date: June 8, 1934
- Last air date: 2016

Technical information
- Class: C
- Power: 1 kW

XEAA-AM was a radio station on 1340 AM in Mexicali, Baja California. It was owned by Grupo Radio Centro.

== History ==
XEAA received its first concession in 1934. It broadcast on 920 kHz and was owned by Carlos Blando. Blando promptly transferred the station to Rosendo Herrera G. in 1936; it was sold to Alberto González in 1937, and by the 1960s XEAA was moved to 1340 and owned by Consuelo Tonella de King. Consuelo Tonella Escamilla became the concessionaire by the 1980s. Grupo Radio Capital bought XEAA in 2004, and the current concessionaire took control in 2008.

In 2016, Grupo Radio Centro absorbed the stations of its corporate sibling, Grupo Radio México, taking XEAA-AM off the air.
