= XHKB-FM =

Radio station in Guadalajara, Jalisco

- Guadalajara, Jalisco; Mexico
- Frequency: 99.9 MHz (HD Radio)
- Branding: La Lupe

Programming
- Format: Variety hits

Ownership
- Owner: Multimedios Radio; (Radio Informativa, S.A. de C.V.)

History
- First air date: May 7, 1959 (concession); September 2, 2019 (FM)
- Former call signs: XEKB-AM (1959–2021)
- Former frequencies: 1590 kHz, 1410 kHz (–2021)

Technical information
- Licensing authority: CRT
- Class: A
- ERP: 2 kW
- HAAT: 287.5 meters (943 ft)
- Transmitter coordinates: 20°36′1.14″N 103°21′55.22″W

Links
- Website: www.lamusica.com/en/stations/xhkb

XHKB-FM is a radio station on 99.9 FM in Guadalajara, Jalisco. It is owned by Multimedios Radio and carries its variety hits format, La Lupe.

== History ==
Final logo as Canal 1410

XEKB-AM received its concession on May 7, 1959. It was owned by Promotriz Radiofónica, S.A., and broadcast from Atemajac on 1590 kHz. Between 1963 and 1966, XEKB moved down the dial to 1410, eventually raising power to 25,000 watts day. The station was sold by Radiodifusoras Capital to Grupo Radiodigital Siglo XXI, later absorbed by Grupo Radio México and then Grupo Radio Centro, in 2008.

In 2019, the station conducted its second-wave migration as XHKB-FM 99.9 with 3,000 watts ERP. It was announced on August 26, 2019, days after signing on, that XHKB would begin simulcasting Alfa from XHFAJ-FM Mexico City with local advertising on September 2, 2019, bringing Canal 1410 to an end after more than 40 years.

On September 3, 2020, the station started airing the Planeta pop format, which moved from XHDK-FM 94.7. A month later, on October 9, the station left AM for good. Planeta still carried a partial simulcast of Alfa's morning show "Toño Esquinca y la muchedumbre". A sale to Grupo Radio Digital, owner of stations primarily in southeastern Mexico, was announced in October 2021 by that company but never carried out.

Planeta announced it was ceasing operations on December 22, 2022. Two days later, the station switched to the La Lupe adult hits format from Multimedios Radio. Multimedios then received the concession in May 2023.
