= XHMF-FM =

Radio station in Monterrey, Nuevo León

- Monterrey, Nuevo León; Mexico
- Frequency: 104.5 MHz
- Branding: KY

Programming
- Format: Urban

Ownership
- Owner: Grupo Radiorama; (XHMF-FM, S.A. de C.V.)
- Operator: Grupo Audiorama Comunicaciones

History
- First air date: May 7, 1985 (concession)

Technical information
- Licensing authority: CRT
- Class: B1
- ERP: 19.923 kW
- HAAT: −118.8 meters (−390 ft)
- Transmitter coordinates: 25°39′27.0″N 100°20′04.1″W

Links
- Webcast: Listen live
- Website: audiorama.mx

XHMF-FM is a radio station on 104.5 FM in Monterrey, Nuevo León, Mexico. The station is operated by Audiorama, a related company to Radiorama, which owns it, and is known as KY (pronounced like "calle") with an Urban format.

== History ==
XHMF received its concession on May 7, 1985. It was owned by Radio General, S.A. In the mid-2000s, Grupo Radio México (since subsumed into Grupo Radio Centro) began operating the station with its Planeta pop format. On August 1, 2014, it became a relay station of Mexico City station XHFAJ-FM Alfa, with local advertising.

On May 18, 2025, Grupo Radio Centro ceased operating XHMF, causing the end of Alfa on the frequency, passing to the administration of Grupo Audiorama Comunicaciones with its urban KY format based on XHDK-FM of Guadalajara the following day.
