= XHETB-FM =

Radio station in Gómez Palacio, Durango, Mexico

XHETB-FM / XETB-AM
- Gómez Palacio, Durango; Mexico
- Broadcast area: Comarca Lagunera
- Frequencies: 1350 kHz; 89.1 MHz
- Branding: Kiss FM

Programming
- Format: English classic hits

Ownership
- Owner: Grupo Zócalo; (Chat FM, S.A. de C.V.)
- Operator: Grupo Horizonte Lagunero
- Sister stations: XHCCAS-FM, XHCCAW-FM

History
- First air date: September 24, 1931

Technical information
- Licensing authority: CRT
- Class: B (AM); B1 (FM)
- Power: 5 kW day 0.5 kW night
- ERP: 25 kW
- HAAT: 297.8 m (977 ft)

Links
- Webcast: Listen live
- Website: hola.mx

XHETB-FM/XETB-AM is a radio station on 89.1 FM and 1350 AM in Gómez Palacio, Durango, Mexico. It is part of Grupo Horizonte Lagunero, a division of Grupo Zócalo, and is known as Kiss FM.

== History ==
XETB came to air on September 24, 1931, making it the first station in the region. Original authorization was given to begin operations on February 14, 1935, with 125 watts. XETB was then on 1310 kHz and owned by Miguel Guangorena Salas. It originally operated from Torreón, Coahuila, and currently has its studios there. Amelio G. Zaragoza acquired XETB in 1935 and sold it to Radio Laguna, S.A., in 1947. XETB later moved to 1350 kHz and increased its power to 5,000 watts.

On October 26, 2022, acting on an 11-year-old application, the Federal Telecommunications Institute (IFT) approved the migration of XETB to FM as XHETB-FM 89.1 in exchange for a one-time payment of 1.72 million pesos. XHETB-FM began broadcasting in October 2023 as part of a newly formed cluster with two of the Comarca Lagunera's three stations created in the IFT-8 radio station auction of 2022, XHCCAS-FM 91.9 and XHCCAW-FM 99.1. The IFT then also approved the transfer of its concession from a Grupo Radio Centro subsidiary to a new Grupo Zócalo subsidiary.
