= XHPBCQ-FM =

Radio station in Cancún, Quintana Roo

- Cancún, Quintana Roo; Mexico
- Frequency: 94.9 FM (HD Radio)
- Branding: La Z

Programming
- Format: Regional Mexican

Ownership
- Owner: Promo Éxitos; (Promotora de Éxitos, S.A. de C.V.)
- Sister stations: XHCCBN-FM

History
- First air date: 2019
- Call sign meaning: Benito Juárez/Cancún, Quintana Roo

Technical information
- Licensing authority: CRT
- Class: B1
- ERP: 25 kW
- HAAT: 59.4 m (195 ft)
- Transmitter coordinates: 21°09′39.93″N 86°51′08.01″W

Links
- Website: lazcancun.com

XHPBCQ-FM is a radio station on 94.9 FM in Cancún, Quintana Roo. The station is owned by Promo Éxitos and known as La Z, and carries a Regional Mexican format.

== History ==
XHPBCQ was awarded in the IFT-4 radio auction of 2017 for $86.5 million pesos and was the most expensive single station in the entire auction. It officially came on air by 2019 and simulcast the Alfa pop format from XHFAJ-FM 91.3 in Mexico City.

Grupo Radio Centro initiated a process to sell 10 stations outside Mexico City, including XHPBCQ, in 2020. In October 2021, the Federal Telecommunications Institute approved the transfer of XHPBCQ and Promotora de Éxitos to Rafael Aguirre and his company, La Mera en Playa, S.A. de C.V.

In May 2022, XHCCQ/XECCQ 91.5/630 was relaunched under Audiorama's La Bestia Grupera brand, and La Z was moved from XHCCQ to XHPBCQ.
