= XERC-FM =

Radio station in Mexico City

- Mexico City; Mexico
- Frequency: 97.7 MHz (HD Radio)
- Branding: La Mejor FM

Programming
- Format: Regional Mexican

Ownership
- Owner: MVS Radio; (Stereorey México, S.A.)
- Sister stations: XHEXA-FM, XHMVS-FM

History
- First air date: 1974
- Call sign meaning: Station was the FM counterpart to XERC-AM, owned by Grupo Radio Centro

Technical information
- Licensing authority: CRT
- Class: C
- ERP: 99.707 kW
- HAAT: 476 meters (1,562 ft)
- Transmitter coordinates: 19°27′8.07″N 99°22′3.05″W

Links
- Website: lamejor.com.mx

XERC-FM (97.7 MHz) is a radio station in Mexico City. XERC-FM is owned by MVS Radio and is the national flagship for its La Mejor Regional Mexican format.

XERC-FM broadcasts in HD. The transmitter is located atop a tower in the La Mesa/Villa Alpina site at the outskirts west of Mexico City, sharing the site with Grupo Radio Centro.

Though approved to begin broadcasting in 1963, the station was not on the air until 1974. Founded by Grupo Radio Centro, the station had primarily contemporary hit formats in English and Spanish in its history until 2018, when it switched to a news format as part of a major shuffle of Grupo Radio Centro's programming. In 2020, Grupo Radio Centro sold XERC-FM to MVS Radio, giving the latter company three FM stations in the capital and allowing it to bring La Mejor on FM to the market.

== History ==
=== Radio Hits and Stereo 97.7 ===
XERC-FM signed on in 1974, more than a decade after receiving its concession on July 26, 1963, alongside the two other FM stations built by Grupo Radio Centro, and was originally known as "Radio Hits", airing current music in English. The original concession was held by Radio Popular de México, S.A. but was sold to Radio Central de la Provincia in 1975. In August 1988, it changed its format and name to "Stereo 97 7" and now featured mostly Spanish-language pop, becoming a more general CHR station with music both in Spanish and English during the following years. The station's primary innovation in terms of format was the "three-by-three" (de tres por tres) song arrangement, in a time when usually only a song was aired before and after a commercial break. This arrangement was rapidly copied by other stations and even expanded (for example, airing blocks of five or six consecutive songs), and is practically commonplace in all musical stations nowadays. From 1989 until 1993, it was Mexico City's most popular radio station, being surpassed by the Regional Mexican "Sonido Z" (now "La Z") at XEQR-FM.

By the late 2000s, the station's name was simplified to just "97 7", which had been used as a nickname since its launch.

=== Radio Centro 97 7, Lo Qué Te Mueve ===
On November 7, 2016, the station was rebranded as "Radio Centro 97 7", with its format switching to Spanish-language music only, with a heavy emphasis on Latin urban music and reggaeton. Host Toño Esquinca from sister station XHFAJ-FM became the station's director and aired a morning show concurrently with his show on XHFAJ.

On June 1, 2018, Esquinca was replaced with Gabriel Roa, former director of XEQR-FM, who also replaced him in the morning show slot and added more variety to the station, bringing back English-language hits as well as pop hits from the 1980s to the 2000s.

=== Radio Centro Noticias 97.7 ===
On October 17, 2018, the station began airing a morning newscast hosted by Carmen Aristegui (which is produced solely by her), and on December 3, GRC announced that XERC-FM would flip to a talk format beginning on January 14, 2019, retaining the Radio Centro name. Sergio Sarmiento, Guadalupe Juárez, and sport hosts Carlos Albert and Enrique Beas made the move over from Radio Red, Julio Astillero, columnist from the La Jornada newspaper, joined Radio Centro to do an afternoon show, and Aristegui's newscast was expanded by an hour. Carlos Loret de Mola's Sin Anestesia newscast did not carry over, as the host opted not to accept the move of his program from its morning timeslot; he would return to W Radio. At launch, the station featured English classic hits musical programming on mid-morning, overnight and weekend slots, but they were dropped on February 1 to make room for the return of the newswheel format previously known as "Formato 21", now renamed "Radio Centro Noticias". Fernanda Tapia joined the station on February 6 in the mid-morning slot. In June 2019, Sarmiento and Juárez left Grupo Radio Centro to join the new Heraldo Radio, at the same time a new newscast hosted by Alejandro Páez Varela (director of website SinEmbargo.mx) and Álvaro Delgado (journalist from Proceso) made its debut. In August, Ricardo Raphael, who had earlier that year resigned from IMER, joined the lineup.

=== Universal 97.7 ===
On October 31, 2019, coinciding with the launch of Radio Centro's TV station XHFAMX-TDT, XERC-FM and XHRED-FM swapped formats, bringing the Universal English classic hits format to 97.7 and moving the talk programming to 88.1. As a transition, XERC simulcasted Universal from 8pm to 5am for two weeks prior to the switch.

From April to mid-May 2020, the Universal format was simulcasted on XEQR-AM.

=== Sale to MVS Radio; flip to La Mejor ===
On May 15, 2020, Grupo Radio Centro announced that it would sell XERC-FM to MVS Radio for a reported $500 million pesos (US$20 million). The deal was intended to give Radio Centro additional capital as it sought to negotiate a deal with its noteholders. MVS took over on June 1 and flipped the station to its La Mejor Regional Mexican format, which had previously aired on XHMVS-FM (from 2006 to 2008) and XEOC-AM (between 2010 and 2012). GRC also announced that the Universal format would return to XHRED-FM, sharing it with the news/talk format. The IFT approved the station to return to Cerro del Chiquihuite from the Grupo Radio Centro tower site in Villa Alpina in December 2022.. However, as of December 2024, XERC-FM still currently broadcasts its signal from Villa Alpina.
