= XEN-AM =

Radio station in Mexico City

- Mexico City; Mexico
- Broadcast area: Greater Mexico City
- Frequency: 690 AM
- Branding: El Fonógrafo

Programming
- Format: Spanish adult hits

Ownership
- Owner: Grupo Radio Centro; (Radio Sistema Mexicano, S.A.)
- Sister stations: XHRED-FM, XHFAJ-FM, XEJP-FM, XEQR-FM, XERC-AM, XEQR-AM, XERED-AM, XEJP-AM

History
- First air date: 1925

Technical information
- Licensing authority: CRT
- Class: B
- Power: 100,000 watts (day); 5,000 watts (night)
- Transmitter coordinates: 19°19′59.3″N 98°59′18.1″W

Links
- Webcast: Listen live
- Website: elfonografo.mx

XEN-AM (branded as El Fonógrafo) is a commercial radio station in Mexico City. It airs a Spanish-language adult hits format on 690 kHz. The station is owned by Grupo Radio Centro.

XEN broadcasts with 100,000 watts by day. However, to avoid interfering with other stations on 690 AM, it reduces power at night to 5,000 watts. The transmitter is in the San Miguel Teotongo neighborhood in Mexico City.

690 AM is a Mexican and Canadian clear-channel frequency; CKGM and XEWW share Class A status of this frequency.

== History ==
Logo as La 69, used from 2001 to 2017

=== Early years ===
XEN-AM started as CYS, on 710 kHz. The station was owned by General Electric Mexico from 1925 to 1930.

For most of 1930, from February 5 to the end of the year, the station, by then known as "Radio Mundial XEN" and bearing its current call sign, offered something never before provided on radio: a constant all news radio service. Radio Noticias was owned by Félix Palavicini, a journalist who acquired the station at the start of the year.

The earliest concession for XEN-AM was awarded to Cervecería Modelo, S.A., in 1934. At that time the station still broadcast on 710 kHz. The next year, the station was transferred to Guillermina Pontones de del Conde, and later it moved to its current dial position on 690 kHz.

=== World Music, Sports and Lounge Music ===
Beginning in the 1950s and until the early 1990s, it carried a world music format as Radio Mundo. In 1993, the station switched to a sports radio format as Radio Sportiva.

By the late 1990s it offered lounge music and newscasts under the name Ondas del Lago.

=== La 69 ===
In 2001, Grupo Radio Centro bought the indebted station, disaffiliated it from the Cadena RASA system and converted it to a news format, known as La 69 - Es Noticia. The purchase was made possible because the previous year Radio Centro had sold 1320 AM and 1560 AM to Infored. However, the station generally lacked unique programming. It mainly aired a simulcast of the two-hour midday newscast of Radio Red, which was hosted by Jacobo Zabludovsky until his death on July 2, 2015, being substituted by Juan Francisco Castañeda. The newscast originated on XEN, before being moved to Radio Red in 2004.

The newscast was recorded and repeated throughout the day and on weekends. Another program, a seven-hour morning talk show, "¿Y usted, qué opina?" hosted by Nino Canún, was cancelled in August 2014. The station's only original programming on its final years were cultural capsules aired during commercial breaks, having no advertisers outside of government and electoral spots.

=== Radio Centro and El Fonógrafo ===
In 2017, citing "changes in AM transmission infrastructure," Grupo Radio Centro reorganized all of its AM radio stations. It shut down several stations and consolidated their programs. La 69 was replaced by content from the former XEQR-AM 1030, talk-formatted Radio Centro, and XEJP-AM 1150, Spanish oldies El Fonógrafo.

Radio Centro's sole program to transition to XEN, "Buenos Días con Héctor Martínez Serrano" aired daily from 5:30 to 10:00am, with El Fonógrafo's musical programming filling in the rest of the air time (except for Sundays at noon, when Catholic mass was aired). From 2019 to 2022, the station was also occasionally used as an overflow to broadcast soccer matches from the Liga MX as well as the UEFA Champions League. Besides airing on XEN, El Fonógrafo also maintains a separate stream solely dedicated to music without announcers or commercial interruptions, which could also be heard on the HD2 subchannel of XEJP-FM until 2020. Martínez Serrano died on May 9, 2020, with his son Manelic and his former collaborators taking over the hosting of "Buenos Días".

Beginning on May 18, 2020, XEN began to be simulcasted on XEQR-AM, ending on June 18, 2022, when the latter rebranded as a sports talk station. Following the August 2023 relaunch of XEQR as an oldies and standards station (similar to El Fonógrafo's original format), "Buenos Días" returned to that frequency and XEN became an all-music station again for the first time since its "Radio Mundo" days.
