= XHFAMX-TDT =

Television station in Mexico City

- Mexico City; Mexico
- Channels: Digital: 28 (UHF); Virtual: 8
- Branding: Heraldo Televisión

Programming
- Subchannels: 8.1: Heraldo Televisión; 8.2: 8.2 TV; 8.3: Unife TV; 8.4: Anesma

Ownership
- Owner: Heraldo Media Group; (R.R. Televisión y Valores para la Innovación S.A. de C.V.)
- Operator: El Heraldo de México

History
- First air date: October 31, 2019
- Former affiliations: La Octava/Grupo Radio Centro (2019–2022)
- Call sign meaning: Francisco Aguirre/Ciudad de México, referring to the station's original concessionaire)

Technical information
- Licensing authority: CRT
- ERP: 300 kW
- HAAT: 302.40 m (992.1 ft)

Links
- Website: heraldodemexico.com.mx/el-heraldo-tv/

XHFAMX-TDT, known as Heraldo Televisión, is a television station in Mexico City broadcasting on virtual channel 8. XHFAMX is owned by Heraldo Media Group, the company that operates the newspaper El Heraldo de México and the Heraldo Radio network. It was originally owned by Francisco Aguirre Gómez, chairman of Grupo Radio Centro, with the latter operating the station. XHFAMX took to the air from Grupo Radio Centro's tower on Cerro del Chiquihuite after having originally applied to build its transmitting facility at the Villa Alpina site in Naucalpan, State of Mexico, from which the company's Mexico City FM stations broadcast.

== History ==
=== Previous Radio Centro ventures into television ===
Grupo Radio Centro's history with television began in 1968, when the company's Corporación Mexicana de Radio y Televisión built XHDF-TV (channel 13). Francisco Aguirre Jiménez, the founder of Organización Radio Centro, installed his son, Francisco Aguirre Gómez, as the manager of the new television station. XHDF had limited resources and came to air as Televisión Independiente de México arrived in Mexico City with XHTM-TV channel 8; the station's program schedule consisted mostly of foreign import series. By 1972, its debts to the federal government were so large that state-owned bank SOMEX expropriated the station and built it into a national television network, first as Canal 13 and later under the aegis of Imevisión.

Radio Centro made another push into television in 2015, when the Federal Telecommunications Institute bid out packages for two national television networks. However, GRC grossly overbid; its offer of 3.058 billion pesos far exceeded the other winning bid of 1.808 billion from Grupo Imagen, which was able to launch Imagen Televisión in October 2016. In the end, GRC opted not to pay and take on the television operation. It struggled to cover the security deposit of 415 million pesos and was forced to seek a loan from Banco del Bajío to help finance the payment. Additionally, it sold and leased back its Mexico City headquarters building. Radio Centro's financial difficulties continued into 2019, when the company was described as facing the "worst crisis" in its 73-year history.

=== Award of XHFAMX and transmitter site switch ===
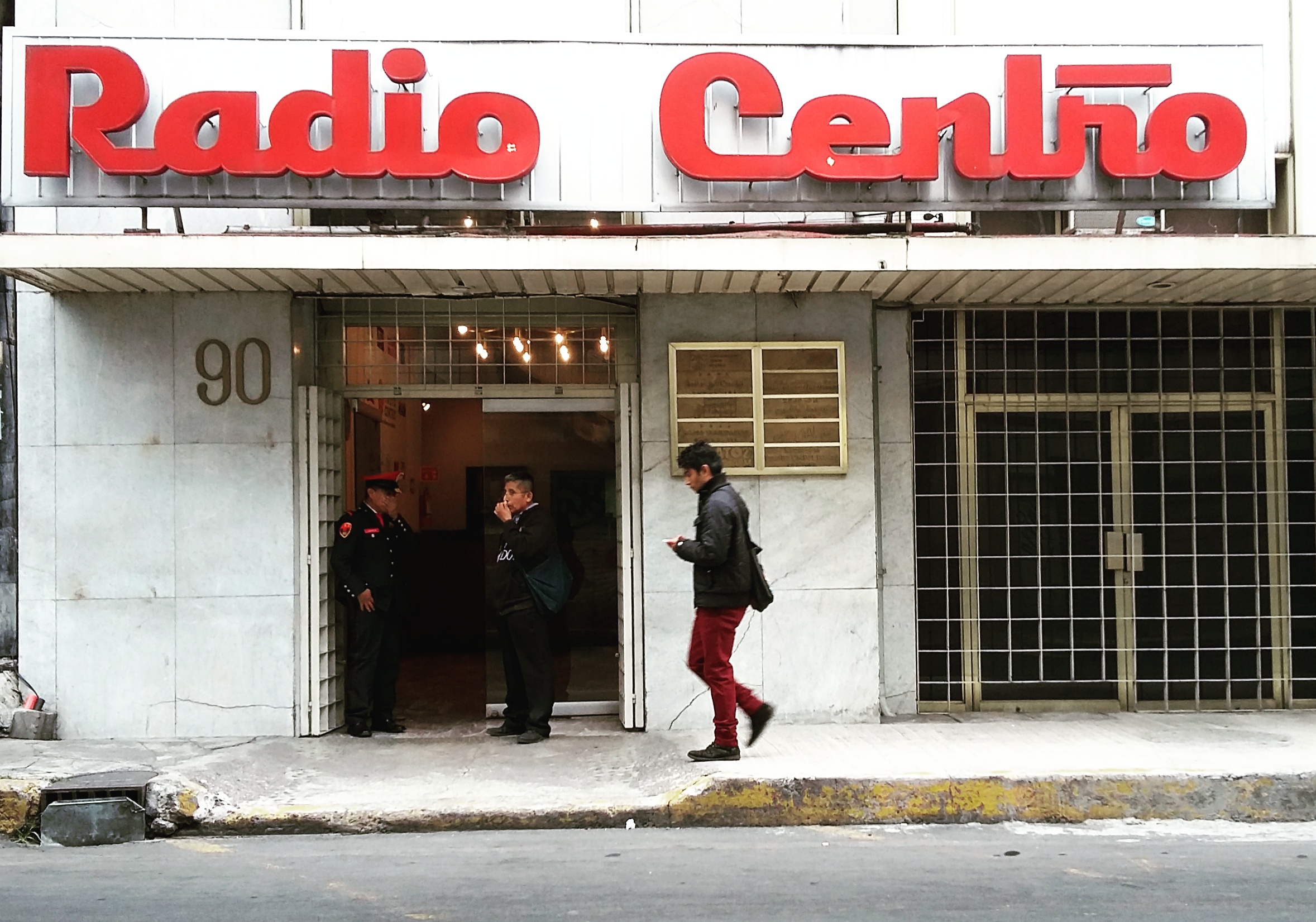
Artículo 123 No. 90 in Mexico City, the building where La Octava's studios are located

XHFAMX was awarded in the IFT-6 television station auction of 2017. Francisco Aguirre Gómez paid Mex$425,929,000 for the concession. Notably, Radio Centro itself did not participate; the company issued a statement denying that it was a party to the auction, distancing itself from its own executive.

In May 2019, Aguirre Gómez announced he would leave his post as CEO of Grupo Radio Centro, effective June 15, 2019, with one of his sons, Juan Aguirre Abdó, replacing him; Aguirre Gómez continued to own more than 36 percent of GRC. The next month, Aguirre Gómez announced that XHFAMX-TDT had selected virtual channel 8, the lowest available in the Mexico City area, and that the station would go on air from Cerro del Chiquihuite, home to almost all of Mexico City's TV stations.

The decision to go on Chiquihuite was a notable change of plan. On September 20, 2018, Aguirre Gómez was authorized to build the station at the GRC FM site west of the city in Naucalpan. However, in a letter to the IFT dated August 1, 2019—notably after having already declared his intention to do so in the media—Aguirre filed to change the station's transmitter site to Chiquihuite, noting that because most of Mexico City's TV stations were there (and the Televisa stations were on Pico Tres Padres, further north), it was advantageous to place the transmitter in the direction that most Mexico City TV antennas were already oriented; the IFT approved the change on August 15.

=== Launch ===
XHFAMX was formally presented to the media at a GRC upfront presentation on October 10, 2019. At that time, it was announced that the station would launch at 10 p.m. on October 31 under the name "La Octava" (The Eighth); the transmitter was turned on October 28. GRC's television studios are located in the building at Artículo 123 No. 90 in Mexico City, where Radio Centro was founded in 1946. The manager of La Octava was also announced as Jorge Mettey, who previously worked in the United States for MundoFox, Univision and Azteca América.

== Programming ==
La Octava leaned on GRC's existing news and talk infrastructure for some of its most important programming. Julio Hernández López, known as Julio Astillero, who hosted an afternoon show for Radio Centro, hosted the station's flagship 10 p.m. newscast. However, Carmen Aristegui, whose morning newscast has been aired by GRC since late 2018, would initially not be seen on La Octava, as she has a preexisting relationship with CNN. At the same time, the news programming that had been airing on 97.7 since its January 14, 2019, relaunch, would move to 88.1, matching the 8.1 assignment of XHFAMX. Vicente Serrano, Álvaro Delgado Gómez and Alejandro Páez Varela were also announced as hosts for the channel's news programming.

The Africam Safari, located in Puebla, was slated to produce several children's and wildlife shows to air on La Octava., however, they never made it to air.

Citing financial reasons, Astillero's 10pm newscast ended on December 20, 2019, while a month later, Vicente Serrano resigned on-air due him alleging that GRC was trying to dictate the content of his program, which he refused. Astillero left the channel (and GRC) on March 20, 2020. The few non-news programming produced by GRC for La Octava were "La Z TV", a grupera magazine show hosted by the DJs of the radio station of the same name and "La Octava de Parranda", a Saturday late-night show hosted by Jorge Muñiz. Most of the channel's remaining on-air schedule consisted of Spanish-dubbed documentaries and specials from Deutsche Welle and infomercials.

As La Octava failed to catch on with the audience except for their newscasts, of which only Carmen Aristegui remained on the channel by mid-2021, it soon became a liability for the already financially-strained GRC. It did not help matters that the channel's newscasts were noted to have a strong bias towards the government of Andrés Manuel López Obrador and against his opposition, and that because of the company's crisis, their news presence on radio had been reduced to 6 hours on weekdays. In March 2022, Jacinto Marina became GRC's new general manager, replacing Juan Aguirre Abdó, with one of his first decisions be to cancel La Octava's newscasts for TV, with them remaining only on radio and on digital platforms. This change took effect in April 1, with La Octava's schedule now only consisting of the aforementioned DW programs as well as independent Mexican films.

In May 2022, GRC announced it had sold XHFAMX to Grupo Andrade, owners of El Heraldo de México and their associated TV and radio networks. La Octava ceased broadcasting on June 12, with Heraldo TV taking its place the next day. However, under a deal between both companies, GRC continues to operate the 8.2 subchannel, which it launched on August 1 as "Free TV", a general entertainment channel with programming supplied by Olympusat. On January 28, 2023, Heraldo launched the 8.3 subchannel, "Unife TV", operated by the Universal Church of the Kingdom of God.
