= XHCCQ-FM =

Radio station in Cancún, Quintana Roo

XHCCQ-FM / XECCQ-AM
- Cancún, Quintana Roo; Mexico
- Frequency: 91.5 FM / 630 AM
- Branding: La Bestia Grupera

Programming
- Format: Grupera

Ownership
- Owner: Grupo Radiorama; (XECCQ-AM, S.A. de C.V.)
- Operator: Grupo Audiorama Comunicaciones

History
- First air date: November 28, 1988 (concession); 1994 (FM)
- Call sign meaning: Cancún, Quintana Roo

Technical information
- Licensing authority: CRT
- Class: B1 (FM); B (AM)
- Power: 5 kW day/0.5 kW night
- ERP: 10 kW
- HAAT: 7.2 m (24 ft)

Links
- Webcast: Listen live
- Website: radiorama.mx/..

XHCCQ-FM 91.5/XECCQ-AM 630 is a combo radio station in Cancún, Quintana Roo, in Mexico. It is owned by Grupo Radiorama and carries its La Bestia Grupera grupera format.

== History ==
Logo used with La Z format

XECCQ received its first concession on November 28, 1988. It was originally owned by Audio Cultura, S.A., a subsidiary of Radiorama. It became an AM-FM combo in 1994. For many years, it was operated by Grupo Radio Centro using its La Z brand.

In May 2022, La Z moved to XHPBCQ-FM 94.9, which Radio Centro had sold to Rafael Aguirre in 2021, and XHCCQ-FM was relaunched under Audiorama's La Bestia Grupera brand.
