= XEJP-AM =

Radio station in Mexico City

- Mexico City; Mexico
- Broadcast area: Greater Mexico City
- Frequency: 1150 kHz
- Branding: Acustik Radio

Programming
- Format: Regional Mexican

Ownership
- Owner: Grupo Acustik; (Emisora 1150, S.A. de C.V.)

History
- First air date: September 15, 1955
- Former call signs: XECMQ-AM (1996–2004)

Technical information
- Licensing authority: CRT
- Class: B
- Power: 20,000 watts (day); 10,000 watts (night) (AM)
- Transmitter coordinates: 19°19′56″N 98°59′18″W

Links
- Webcast: Listen live
- Website: acustik.mx

XEJP-AM (1150 kHz) is a commercial radio station in Mexico City. It is owned by Grupo Acustik and it airs a Regional Mexican radio format.

By day, XEJP is powered at 20,000 watts. However, to avoid interference to other stations on 1150 AM, it reduces power at night to 10,000 watts. It uses a non-directional antenna. The transmitter is off Calle Maravillas in the San Miguel Teotongo neighborhood of Mexico City.

== History ==
While the concession for XEJP was awarded in 1936 for a station on 1130 kHz, owned by Salvador Monterrubio R., it took nearly two decades to begin broadcasts. It signed on the air on September 15, 1955. In 1964, it took on what would be its longest-running format, Radio Variedades with a wide-ranging catalog of music in Spanish.

In 1997, Radio Variedades and the XEJP call sign was moved to 1320, and in return 1150 became news-formatted "Formato 21" XECMQ-AM. In October 2001, 1150 and 790 swapped formats. "Formato 21" was moved to 790, while 1150 adopted the Spanish oldies format "El Fonógrafo" which had aired on 790 since its 1990 launch. The XEJP calls were reclaimed in 2004 after, in the Infored/Radio Centro split, 1320 became XENET.

In 2017, citing "changes in AM transmission infrastructure", Grupo Radio Centro reorganized all of its AM radio stations, shutting down several and consolidating their programs. El Fonógrafo was moved to XEN-AM 690, sharing its musical format with programs from talk station XEQR-AM 1030. XEJP then temporarily went silent.

In January 2019, the IFT approved GRC diplexing XEJP with XEN at its San Miguel Teotongo transmitter site and reducing daytime power from 50,000 to 20,000 watts. XEJP began testing from the new site on August 6, 2019 and resumed regular programming as an Acustik Radio station on September 2, 2019. That same day, Acustik began programming two other former Radio Centro AM stations, XEUNO-AM in Guadalajara, Jalisco and XEMN-AM (later changed to XEFB-AM) in Monterrey, Nuevo León. The three stations were outright sold to Acustik shortly after.
