= Grupo Radio México =

Grupo Radio México was a Mexican owner of radio stations that operated from 1973 to 2015. In 2015, it was absorbed into Grupo Radio Centro, which owns most of GRM's former stations.

== History ==
Grupo Radio México was founded by Francisco Aguirre Gómez, son of Grupo Radio Centro founder Francisco Aguirre Jiménez, in 1973. Its first radio station was XHSP-FM 99.7 in Monterrey.

The group came to air 51 stations in 13 media markets, though it owned no stations in Mexico City, where GRC owns 12.

GRM owned 18 "La Z" regional Mexican stations and syndicated the format to GRC for its Mexico City station. The other large GRM-exclusive format is "Planeta", with 10 stations.

In 2015, given the financial difficulties facing Radio Centro after its failed bid to start a television network, plans were floated that would merge Grupo Radio México with Grupo Radio Centro. Seeking to limit costs after the television concession fiasco, in June 2015, shareholders approved a merger of Radio Centro with Controladora Radio México and GRM Radiodifusión, two components of Grupo Radio México. The merger added 30 radio stations that belonged to Grupo Radio México to Grupo Radio Centro's portfolio and marked its first major expansion outside of Mexico City. GRC did not absorb some of GRM-operated stations in Juárez, or its stations in Mexicali and Los Mochis, whose control passed to its stations' licensee Radiorama.
