= XEJP-FM =

Radio station in Mexico City

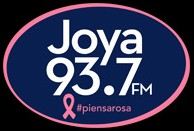
- Mexico City; Mexico
- Broadcast area: Greater Mexico City
- Frequency: 93.7 MHz (HD Radio)
- Branding: Joya 93.7

Programming
- Format: Contemporary music in Spanish

Ownership
- Owner: Grupo Radio Centro; (XEJP-FM, S.A. de C.V.)
- Sister stations: XHRED-FM, XHFAJ-FM, XEQR-FM, XEN-AM, XERC-AM, XEQR-AM, XERED-AM

History
- First air date: 1974 (concession awarded on December 30, 1952)

Technical information
- Licensing authority: CRT
- Class: C
- ERP: 98.10 kW
- HAAT: 470.8 meters (1,545 ft)
- Transmitter coordinates: 19°27′8.07″N 99°22′3.05″W

Links
- Website: joya937.mx

XEJP-FM is a radio station in Mexico City. Located on 93.7 FM, XEJP-FM is owned by Grupo Radio Centro and broadcasts contemporary music in Spanish from the 1980s to the present as "Joya 93.7".

XEJP-FM broadcasts in HD. The transmitter is located atop a tower in the La Mesa/Villa Alpina site in Naucalpan, at the outskirts west of Mexico City.

== History ==
XEJP traces its lineage to the first FM radio station in Mexico. In April 1947, the Diario Oficial de la Federación ran an advisory asking for comments on the proposed award of a station on 94.1 MHz to Federico Obregón Cruces, and while said authorization was given on November 28, 1948, it was not until December 30, 1952 that the concession was awarded and the first FM station in Mexico came to air. "XHFM" broadcast with 3,000 watts and would be alone on the band until the sign-on of XEOY-FM in 1955.

The story of Radio Joya, as XHFM was known, was cut short on July 28, 1957, when an earthquake led to the total destruction of its studio facilities. However, the concession lived on. In 1958, as Obregón Cruces began to focus on building a new AM radio station, XHFM's concession passed to Francisco Aguirre Jiménez, the founder of Radio Centro. Owing to the low penetration of FM receivers and the preference of advertisers for AM, the station remained off the air until 1974, but during this period, significant changes were occurring. A realignment of Mexico City FM frequencies shifted the first few stations 400 kHz and led to a move to 93.7. Additionally, as was already the case with Radio Centro's other FM stations, the callsign was changed to match one of the company's existing AM outlets and XHFM became "XEJP-FM". The XHFM callsign would not return to Mexican radio until 2010, when an unrelated XHFM signed on in Veracruz.

XEJP, now on 93.7 MHz, took to the air once more in 1974 as "Radio Joya", with a format of music in Spanish from the 1950s, 60s and 70s. By the end of the decade, it had already undergone two more changes in concessionaire, with Radio América, S.A., and then Radio Impulsora de la Provincia, S.A. de C.V., becoming the concessionaires. In 1991 the station became known as "Stereo Joya" as part of a general refresh of Radio Centro's FM stations; it now had a format of contemporary and romantic music in Spanish.

In 1993, Mariano Osorio, who had hosted news on XEEST-AM 1440 "Radio Éxitos", moved to XEJP-FM. He would become the station's signature personality, beginning with a morning show that on November 22, 1999 expanded to a seven-hour time slot (from 6:00 am until 1:00 pm), known as Hoy con Mariano. This was the first radio program of such a length in Mexico, and the format would later be used by other GRC stations. XEJP also picked up the En Concierto series of interviews with musical artists, which had previously aired on Radio Centro 1030. In 1996, a nightly program named Esencia de Mujer, hosted by Rocio Brauer, was added. Both programs ended their runs in November 2015. A nightly program known as Nocturno 93-7, hosted by voice actors Mario Arvizu and Sonia Casillas as well as Osorio's assistant Carlos Valle, replaced the latter on May 2, 2016.

In 2012, the station's name was changed to just "Joya 93.7". With only these slight variations, the station has used "Joya" in its name throughout its entire history.
