= XERC-AM =

Radio station in Mexico City

Currently silent
- Mexico City; Mexico
- Frequency: 790 kHz

Ownership
- Owner: Grupo Radio Centro; (XERC, S.A. de C.V.)
- Sister stations: XHRED-FM, XHFAJ-FM, XEJP-FM, XEQR-FM, XEN-AM, XEQR-AM, XERED-AM

History
- First air date: September 13, 1946
- Call sign meaning: "Radio Continental" (original name, later retconned to "Radio Centro")

Technical information
- Class: B
- Power: 50,000 watts day; 1,000 watts night
- Transmitter coordinates: 19°23′49″N 99°6′6″W

XERC-AM is a radio station based in Mexico City on 790 kHz, currently silent. The station is owned by Grupo Radio Centro.

== History ==
In 1946, Francisco Aguirre Jiménez created XERC-AM under the concessionaire Radio Popular de México, and originally being branded as "Radio Continental". This station would serve as the base for what would become Grupo Radio Centro, as "Radio Éxitos 790" and sister to 1030 AM XEQR-AM, known as "Radio Centro 1030".

In the 1960s it became "La Campeona 7-90", a subname/slogan of "Radio Éxitos", a pioneer in broadcasting Spanish-language rock, but mostly airing then-current music in English from all genres. Its famed Beatles Club program, which began in 1964, remained on the station for 25 years and later moved to FM on "Universal" (XEQR-FM until December 4, 1998, XHFO-FM until May 13, 2016, XHRED-FM until October 30, 2019 and since June 1, 2020, and XERC-FM between October 31, 2019 and May 29, 2020), where it still airs to this day. It was a strong competitor to Nucleo Radio Mil's XEPH-AM ("La Pantera") and Grupo ACIR's XEL-AM ("Radio Capital") for younger audiences who listened to the latest music in English.

On September 12, 1988, 790 AM was relaunched as "Expresión 7-90", a spoken format. On October 21, 1990, the station flipped to an oldies Spanish music format as "El Fonógrafo" (The Phonograph). In October 2001, XERC and 1150 AM, then XECMQ (now XEJP-AM) switched formats: El Fonógrafo moved up to 1150 AM, and Formato 21, an all-news format consisting of a 21-minute news wheel that originated in 1993 on 1320 AM, moved down to 790.

On May 14, 2017, citing "changes in AM transmission infrastructure", Grupo Radio Centro reorganized all of its AM radio stations, shutting down several and consolidating their programs. Formato 21's news wheel moved to XERED-AM 1110. XERC then went silent.

On June 21, 2019, the Federal Telecommunications Institute authorized GRC to relocate XERC-AM to the transmitter site of XEB-AM, owned by the Instituto Mexicano de la Radio. The IFT had authorized an identical change in 2017, which expired in 2018 without being completed. On May 17, 2022, the IFT authorized GRC yet again to relocate the station's transmitter site, this time to their San Miguel Teotongo tower that also hosts XEN-AM and (no longer owned by GRC) XEJP-AM; however, this change has yet to take place and the station remains silent. GRC has indicated in their latest annual reports that XERC's concession has been provided as a collateral in order to guarantee the payments for the lease of their Mexico City headquarters building.
