= XHFAJ-FM =

Contemporary hit radio station in Mexico City

- Mexico City; Mexico
- Broadcast area: Greater Mexico City
- Frequency: 91.3 MHz (HD Radio)
- Branding: Alfa 91.3

Programming
- Language: English
- Format: Contemporary hit radio

Ownership
- Owner: Grupo Radio Centro; (Estación Alfa, S.A. de C.V.)
- Sister stations: XHRED; XEJP; XEQR-FM; XEN; XERC; XEQR; XERED

History
- First air date: 1968
- Former call signs: XEQK-FM; XHRCA-FM
- Call sign meaning: Francisco Aguirre Jiménez, founder of Grupo Radio Centro, also referencing former sister station XEFAJ-AM

Technical information
- Licensing authority: CRT
- Class: C
- ERP: 99.45 kW
- HAAT: 559.43 meters (1,835.4 ft)
- Transmitter coordinates: 19°27′8.07″N 99°22′3.05″W

Links
- Website: alfaenlinea.com

XHFAJ-FM (91.3 FM) is a Mexican radio station in Mexico City. The station is owned by Grupo Radio Centro and carries a contemporary hit radio format known as Alfa 91.3.

XHFAJ-FM broadcasts in HD. The transmitter is located in La Mesa/Villa Alpina in Naucalpan, at the outskirts west of Mexico City.

== History ==
The station began broadcasting in 1968, as Radio Sinfonía de México airing classical music. In 1973, it was sold to the concessionaire of XEQK-AM and began simulcasting that station.

After being sold again to Radio Programas de México, the station was relaunched on September 13, 1986, with its current name, airing then-current music in English.

Alfa 91.3 was created by Clemente Serna Barrera of Radio Programas de México (RPM). Its forerunners included Martha Debayle, Rocío Barbabosa, Edward "Fast Eddie" Muller, Eduardo Vallarta, Claudia Arellano, and Luisa Carrandi.

In April 1990, Alfa 91.3 was present at the inauguration of the Cabo Wabo in Baja California, Mexico, obtaining an exclusive interview with Van Halen and their new vocalist back then, Sammy Hagar, who was replacing David Lee Roth.

In June of that same year, Alfa made the first simulcast of the Knebworth Festival concert in England, live for 12 continuous hours, with the original audio of the concert being played on Mexican airwaves and exclusive interviews with the likes of Paul McCartney and Eric Clapton, among others.

In January 1991, Alfa 91.3 was present during the Rock in Rio II Festival, where concerts were broadcast from Maracanã Stadium with Guns and Roses, George Michael, New Kids on the Block, Billy Idol, Megadeth and many more bands. Alfa 91.3 produced daily news flashes from Rio de Janeiro, direct live, with all the details of what was going on.

Alfa 91.3 FM was the first station in Mexico City to broadcast a Top 40 format with a proven radio formula that had an impact on ratings back then thanks to a man by the name of Bruce Miller Earle. The slogan that was used from 1990 to 1993, was "Radio Bang!", causing concern among the stations that dominated the airwaves like WFM 96.9, led by Alejandro González Iñárritu and Rock 101. Alfa 91.3 held the top Nielsen positions at the time and was also the first station in Mexico City to broadcast jingles in English.

Alfa 91.3 paved the way for commercial radio in Mexico. Alfa was the first station to carry out live remote controls from concerts, restaurants, shopping centers, universities and different beaches throughout Mexico. Alfa had a mobile unit that was capable of transmitting from anywhere in Mexico. It is thanks to this mobile unit that dozens of live remote controls were carried out from the Palacio de los Deportes where the first concerts were given in Mexico City in the early 90s, with the likes of Sting, INXS, Metallica, MC Hammer, and many more.

In 1995, after being acquired by Grupo Radio Centro, the station's format switched to electronic music and eurodance, and during that time even became Mexico City's top-rated station for several months, but as the decade ended and dance music declined in popularity, Alfa returned to be a contemporary hit radio format by 1999. From 2000 to 2003, it even added some Spanish-language hits.

During the 2000s, Alfa mostly remained with a CHR format, focusing on rock, pop and hip-hop music. From 2006 to early 2009, the station's programming was heavily composed of post-grunge and emo rock alongside the other genres.

By 2009, after gradually losing audience due to competition with similar stations such as XHDFM-FM, XHSON-FM and XHPOP-FM, it changed its programming to focus on music from the 1990s, with few current songs.

On January 13, 2010, popular radio host Toño Esquinca, who had a month earlier resigned from XHDFM-FM, moved to Alfa with his show La Muchedumbre, airing every day from 6 am to 1 pm. The station's programming was modified to include songs from the 1980s as well, trying to mimick XHDFM's format, but they were gradually phased out. During La Muchedumbre, however, it is common for the station to play both English and Spanish classic and alternative rock. Also, for a time after the demise of GRC's pop formats, Latin urban music joined Alfa's programming, though it was removed by the end of 2020.

From November 2012 to January 2014, La Muchedumbre also aired on KXOS (a station then indirectly controlled by Grupo Radio Centro).

On August 1, 2014, Monterrey's XHMF-FM also adopted the Alfa format, relaying most of XHFAJ's programming but with local advertising. Five years later, on September 2, 2019, XHKB-FM in Guadalajara began simulcasting Alfa in the same manner, although it was replaced with the Spanish pop format Planeta a year later. On May 18, 2025, XHMF dropped the Alfa simulcast after GRC stopped operating said station. The station was also previously relayed in Ciudad Juárez over XHEPR-FM and in Cancún over XHPBCQ-FM.
