= XHRED-FM =

Radio station in Mexico City

- Mexico City; Mexico
- Frequency: 88.1 FM (HD Radio)
- Branding: Universal

Programming
- Format: Classic hits

Ownership
- Owner: Grupo Radio Centro; (Radio Red FM, S.A. de C.V.)
- Sister stations: XHFAJ-FM, XEJP-FM, XEQR-FM, XEN-AM, XERC-AM, XEQR-AM, XERED-AM

History
- First air date: 1976
- Former call signs: XHVIP-FM (1991-1994)
- Call sign meaning: Radio RED (station was known as Radio Red FM and is a sister station to XERED-AM)

Technical information
- Licensing authority: CRT
- Class: C
- ERP: 95.128 kW
- HAAT: 559.43 meters (1,835.4 ft)
- Transmitter coordinates: 19°27′8.07″N 99°22′3.05″W

Links
- Webcast: Listen live
- Website: laoctava.com universal881.com

XHRED-FM is a radio station on 88.1 FM in Mexico City. XHRED-FM is owned by Grupo Radio Centro and broadcasts a combined format of news/talk and English classic hits known as Universal. The transmitter is located atop a tower in the La Mesa/Villa Alpina site in Naucalpan, at the outskirts west of Mexico City.

== History ==
=== Radio Red ===
Radio Central de México, S.A., the operator and concessionaire of XERED-AM, first received a concession to operate an FM radio station in Mexico City in 1972. XHRED-FM then launched in 1976 picking up a format previously heard on 1560 AM: "Radio VIP" with a mix of programming and music primarily in English. Further, in the 1980s, Spanish-language newscasts were added with the title Monitor, airing simultaneously with sister station XERED-AM. In 1991, the station's callsign was changed to XHVIP-FM in reference to its then-name. In 1993, the station dropped the Radio VIP name and branded itself simply as "88.1"; by the beginning of 1994, its callsign had been changed back to XHRED-FM.

On November 29, 1994, Radiodifusión Red—which, by this point, had grown to include XERED-AM, XHRED-FM, and XHRCA-FM 91.3 in Mexico City, as well as Radio Red repeaters in Guadalajara and Monterrey (XEDKR-AM 700 and XESTN-AM 1540)—was announced to be sold off to Grupo Radio Centro, with the latter beginning to operate the stations in May 1995 and the sale being completed in January 1996. In January 1995, 88.1 finally adopted the "Radio Red FM" name. The station continued to air the Monitor newscasts, now produced by Gutiérrez Vivó's company Infored, alongside contemporary music in English and a nightly program focused on jazz, which ended in 2001. For media concentration reasons, Radio Centro sold two stations (1320 AM, which became XENET-AM, and 1560 AM, which became XEINFO-AM) to Infored in 1998, with the stations being relaunched in 2000. In 2004, Grupo Radio Centro and "Monitor" newscast producer Infored parted ways after a lengthy dispute that ended in a legal resolution in favor of Infored, which resulted in the end of the Monitor newscasts on Radio Red after 30 years. Radio Centro responded by increasing XHRED-FM's effective radiated power to 95 kW and expanding its own in-house and self-produced news offerings. In April 2013, the station dropped the "Radio" prefix from its name and was known simply as "Red FM".

=== Universal 88.1 ===
On May 16, 2016, Red FM and Universal 92.1 swapped radio frequencies. Despite the name change, the station's callsign remains unchanged, and XERED-AM was still broadcast over its HD Radio subchannel until said station went off the air in January 2019. The Universal English classic hits format was created in 1974 on XEQR-FM, originally being known as "Radio Universal" and then "Universal Stereo". From April 9 to December 7, 2018, a morning newscast called "Sin anestesia" ("No Anesthesia") hosted by newscaster Carlos Loret de Mola was broadcast on the station, causing controversy among listeners and subsequently lower ratings than its programming the year before. The newscast ended as Loret de Mola couldn't reach an agreement with GRC to continue when the company opted to consolidate its talk programming on a relaunched XERC-FM, which would have required the show to move to a new timeslot.

=== La Octava ===
As part of the launch of Radio Centro's TV station, XHFAMX-TDT, on October 31, 2019, Universal moved to XERC-FM and all the talk programming moved back to XHRED, which took the same "La Octava" (The Eighth) name as the TV station. Not all programming on La Octava radio was a TV simulcast.

Beginning February 10, 2020, the station added contemporary music in Spanish and English during non-news hours following the cancellation of several programs and the elimination of looped newscast reruns. On May 23, following XERC-FM's sale to MVS Radio, GRC announced that the Universal format would return to XHRED, sharing airtime with three of La Octava's newscasts on weekdays beginning June 1. To compensate for the Universal radio format no longer being fully musical, a new Internet audio streaming portal known as "Universal Stereo Online" was launched on the same day, with a 24-hour music stream.

From July 4, 2022 to August 6, 2023, the station was simulcasted on XERED-AM with advertising replaced with PSAs and cultural/educational capsules.
