= XERED-AM =

Radio station in Mexico City

- Mexico City; Mexico
- Broadcast area: Greater Mexico City
- Frequencies: 1110 kHz
- Branding: Radio Red

Programming
- Format: News/Talk/Sports with contemporary music in English

Ownership
- Owner: Grupo Radio Centro; (Radio Red, S.A. de C.V.)
- Sister stations: XHRED-FM, XHFAJ-FM, XEJP-FM, XEQR-FM, XEN-AM, XEQR-AM, XERC-AM,

History
- First air date: December 30, 1930
- Call sign meaning: XE Radio RED

Technical information
- Licensing authority: CRT
- Class: B
- Power: 50 kW
- Transmitter coordinates: 19°18′54.7″N 99°04′49.4″W

Links
- Webcast: Listen live
- Website: redam.mx

XERED-AM (1110 kHz) is a commercial radio station in Mexico City. It is owned by Grupo Radio Centro and it airs a talk radio format including news and sports, known as Radio Red. Late nights and weekends, it plays contemporary hits in English.

XERED-AM is powered at 50,000 watts. AM 1110 is a United States clear-channel frequency reserved for Class A stations KFAB Omaha and WBT Charlotte. Its transmitter is located in the El Vergel neighborhood in Iztapalapa, Mexico City.

== History ==
=== XEFO and XERCN ===
The concession history for XERED-AM begins with XEFO, a radio station launched on December 30, 1930. It originally broadcast on 940 kHz as the radio station of the National Revolutionary Party (later the PRI). The earliest available concession for XEFO dates to July 1, 1932. Despite the ban on political use of radio stations, XEFO radio was used as a method of disseminating party ideology, government accomplishments and as the chief medium of broadcasting news and propaganda during Lázaro Cárdenas's 1934 presidential election. XEFO was also relayed on shortwave XEUZ, which broadcast on 6120 kHz with 5 kW. Not long after Cárdenas was replaced by Miguel Alemán, XEFO was sold in 1941 to Francisco Aguirre Jiménez, who changed the call sign to XEQR-AM and used it to launch what became Grupo Radio Centro. That company would end up buying Radio Red in 1994. However, XEQR was launched on a separate concession.

In 1946, a new station on 1110 kHz was established. XERCN-AM was owned by Rafael Cutberto Navarro through concessionaire Radio Central de México, S.A., with the concession history of XEFO.

=== XERED ===
In 1973, the station was sold to Clemente Serna Martínez and his Radio Programas de México. That company launched a new format for the station the next year. It was "Radio Red". The call sign was changed to XERED-AM and the station began pioneering longform news and talk programming. Radio Red's flagship newscast was Monitor, which started on September 2, 1974, and whose morning edition was hosted by José Gutiérrez Vivó. Also in the 1970s, the station launched an FM sister station, XHRED-FM at 88.1 MHz. The company later acquired XHRCA-FM at 91.3 MHz.

Monitor grew to have four daily editions, morning, noon, evening and midnight. It became Mexico City's top-rated radio newscast by the late 1980s.

RPM/Radiodifusora Red had Radio Red repeaters in Guadalajara, XEDKR-AM 700, and Monterrey, XESTN-AM 1540. In 1994, it was sold to Grupo Radio Centro. After the sale, Gutiérrez Vivó created Infored, which remained in charge of producing Monitor and other news programming, while all of XERED's other talk programs and hosts became part of Radio Centro.

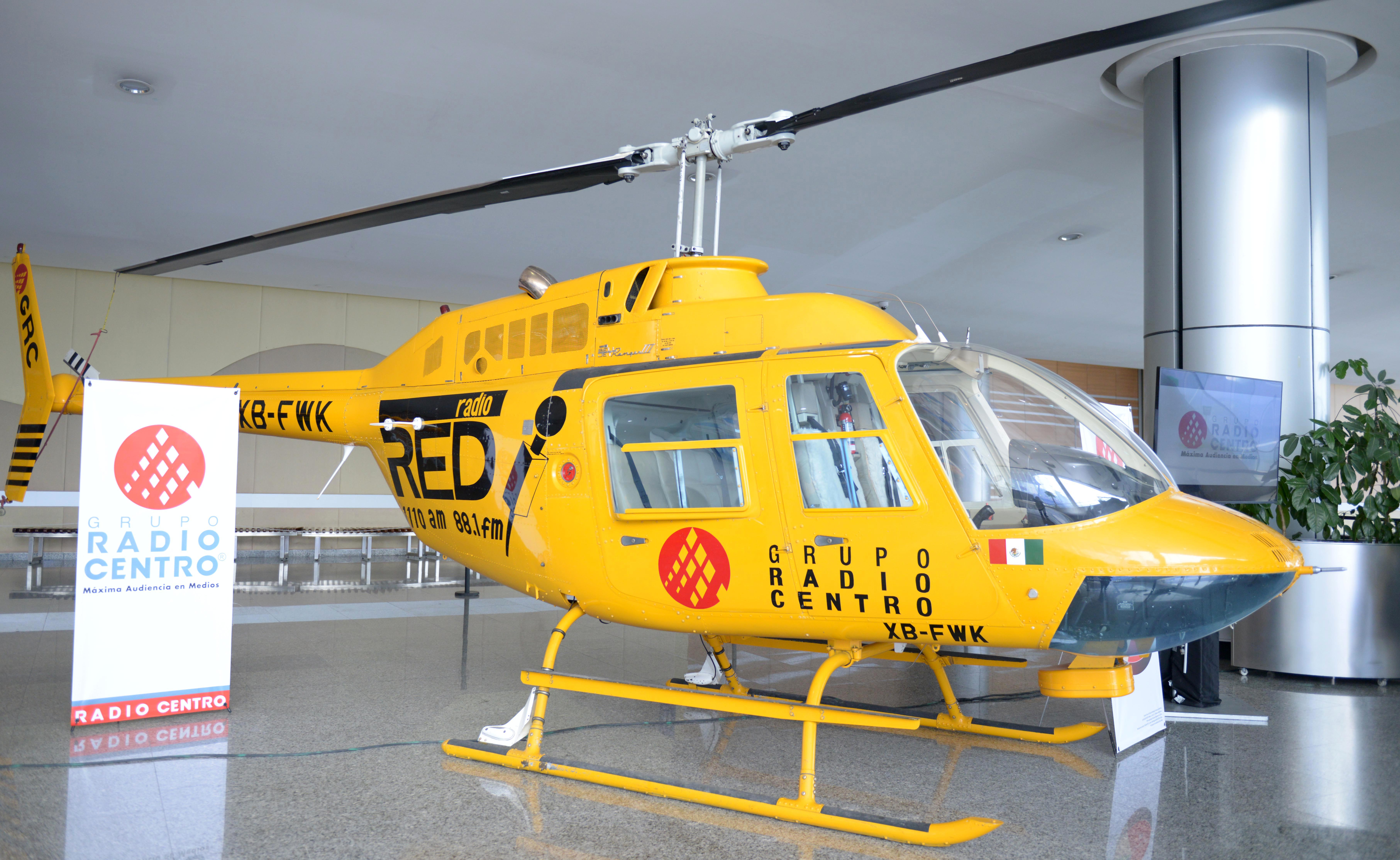
The Radio Red traffic helicopter on display at the 57th National Radio and Television Week in Mexico City in 2015

For media concentration reasons, Radio Centro sold two stations (1320 AM, which became XENET-AM, and 1560 AM, which became XEINFO-AM) to Infored in 1998, with the stations relaunched in 2000. After a legal conflict between the two sides that culminated in a lawsuit won by Infored, in 2004 the Monitor newscasts were removed from Radio Red after almost 30 years on air. )They continued on 1320 and 1560 AM until 2008.) Radio Centro responded by increasing XERED's daytime power to 100 kW from 50 kw and replacing Monitor with its own news offerings.

=== Reorganization ===
In 2017, citing "changes in AM transmission infrastructure", Grupo Radio Centro reorganized all of its AM radio stations, shutting down several and consolidating their programs. Formato 21's news wheel format moved from XERC-AM 790 to 1110 AM, which continued to carry the La Red de Radio Red newscasts. Most of XERED's non-news programs moved to XHFO-FM.

On January 18, 2019, at 9pm, XERED went off the air due to a transmitter relocation. The news and talk programming was only being available as an online-only stream. It played classical music when no talk programs were scheduled. The Formato 21 newswheel format was rebranded as "Radio Centro Noticias" and moved to XERC-FM beginning on February 1, but ultimately disappeared at the end of the year.

On August 8, 2019, the station's talk programming was combined with that of XEQR-AM in a single online stream under the latter's "Radio Centro 1030" banner. The stream was shut down on May 15, 2020.

=== New transmitter site ===
On September 9, 2021, the Federal Telecommunications Institute authorized GRC to relocate XERED-AM to the transmitter site of XEMP-AM and XEQK-AM, owned by the Instituto Mexicano de la Radio. In June 2022, XERED returned to the air intermittently after a 41-month absence, broadcasting Universal Stereo Online programming as a test signal. On July 4, it formally resumed broadcasting as a full simulcast of XHRED-FM "Universal", although with XHRED's advertising replaced with PSAs and cultural interstitials similar to those previously aired on Radio Red.

On August 7, 2023, the sports and talk programming that until the previous day had aired on XEQR-AM was changed to XERED, changing its name to "Radio Centro Noticias y Deportes", also simulcasting the "La Octava" newscasts with XHRED. During off-hours, the station airs classic rock and alternative rock in English. The station retook the Radio Red name on September 21.
