= XEOC-AM =

Radio station in Mexico City

- Mexico City; Mexico
- Broadcast area: Mexico City
- Frequency: 560 AM
- Branding: Radio Chapultepec

Programming
- Format: News/talk, Regional Mexican

Ownership
- Owner: Grupo Radio Digital; (Estéreo Sistema, S.A.)

History
- First air date: 1958
- Call sign meaning: Federico Obregón Cruces (original concessionaire)

Technical information
- Licensing authority: CRT
- Class: B
- Power: 1,500 watts (day); 500 watts (night)
- Transmitter coordinates: 19°26′49.38″N 99°12′7.81″W

Links
- Webcast: Listen live
- Website: radiochapultepec.mx

XEOC-AM (branded as Radio Chapultepec) is a radio station owned by Grupo Radio Digital in Mexico City. It broadcasts a mixed talk and Regional Mexican format on 560 AM.

== History ==
XEOC-AM signed on in 1958, owned by Federico Obregón Cruces and branded as Radio Chapultepec. For years it aired a format of jazz, blues, swing, R&B and other classic genre songs, similar to its competitor XENK-AM 620.

In late 2007 Óscar Obregón encountered financial problems and sold the station to Grupo Radio Digital, which rebranded it as La Nueva Pop airing a pop format. In 2008, the format was changed again, to talk radio.

On January 31, 2010, at 23:59 CST, Radio Chapultepec ceased broadcasting to start as La Mejor AM when Grupo Radio Digital and MVS entered into a joint alliance; the new station broadcast a Regional Mexican format previously heard on the latter's XHMVS-FM 102.5. However, the alliance between GRD and MVS ended on August 31, 2012, and the station returned as Radio Chapultepec.
