= XEDA-AM =

Radio station in Mexico City (1936–2015)

Defunct
- Mexico City; Mexico
- Broadcast area: Greater Mexico City
- Frequency: 1290 kHz
- Branding: Radio Trece

Programming
- Format: News/talk

Ownership
- Owner: Radio S.A.; (Carlos de Jesús Quiñones Armendáriz)

History
- First air date: December 3, 1936
- Last air date: May 31, 2015

Technical information
- Class: B
- Power: 10,000 watts daytime; 1,000 watts nighttime

XEDA-AM was a radio station on 1290 AM in Mexico City. It began operations on December 3, 1936, and it was the flagship station of Radio S.A. with a news/talk format under the name Radio Trece. The station went off the air on May 31, 2015, and the concession expired on July 3, 2016.

== History ==
The first concession for XEDA was awarded to Augusto García Díaz, for a station on 680 kHz. Not long after, it moved to its final 1290 kHz frequency.

In 1953, the station was bought by Publicistas, S.A., the business of Guillermo Morales Blumenkron, which also obtained a concession for XEDA-FM (now separately owned). In 1991, it changed its name to Corazón Latino, using boleros and Caribbean rhythms in its programming. In 1992, it changed its format and was called Rock N' Radio, with oldies music in English. This was maintained until December 1993, when XEDA-AM was sold by Grupo Imagen to Radio S.A. and became Radio Trece with the news/talk format.

While Radio Trece programming continued online, the AM radio station was turned off on May 31, 2015. Radio S.A. cited the unprofitability of AM radio in its decision. Radio S.A. also cited a lack of official advertising budget for AM radio stations in Mexico City, the unavailability of the AM band on newer radios, and poor sound quality, in its decision; it noted that it had to lay off 150 people "for being obligated to operate with obsolete technology". XEDA's concession was unable to be renewed and expired on July 3, 2016.
