= XENK-AM =

Radio station in Mexico City

- Mexico City; Mexico
- Broadcast area: Greater Mexico City
- Frequency: 620 kHz
- Branding: Radio La Guadalupana

Programming
- Format: Catholic
- Network: ESNE Radio

Ownership
- Owner: Cadena RASA; (Radio M73 XENK, S. de R.L. de C.V.)

History
- First air date: June 20, 1949

Technical information
- Licensing authority: CRT
- Class: B
- Power: 50 kW day 5 kW night
- Transmitter coordinates: 19°33′46.2″N 99°04′38.7″W

Links
- Webcast: Listen live
- Website: esneradio.com/laguadalupana

XENK-AM is a radio station in Mexico City, with its transmitter at San Andrés de la Cañada in Ecatepec de Morelos, Estado de México. Broadcasting on 620 AM from studios in the Colonia Roma neighborhood of Mexico City, XENK-AM is owned by Cadena RASA and carries the Catholic programming of Radio La Guadalupana ESNE Radio.

== History ==
After an earlier incarnation had its provisional authorization revoked in 1945, the concession for 620 AM in Mexico City was awarded in February 1946, but the station did not hit the air until June 20, 1949. Initially owned by actor and singer Emilio Tuero, XENK was sold to Victor Blanco Blanco.

For decades, XENK was a pioneer in the broadcasting of English-language music in Mexico, carrying a middle of the road format with the simple branding name of "Radio 6-20" and known by its slogan La música que llegó para quedarse ("The music that came to stay"). It was the first radio station in the Hispanic world to play The Beatles, late in 1962.

The Blanco family sold XENK in 1993 to Radiodifusoras Asociadas, S.A. (RASA), a business of the Laris family, and was briefly broadcast in other Mexican cities on RASA's stations before returning to a local scope. The station aired a mix of older music programming, religious and news/talk programs.

In January 2024, RASA leased out the station to ESNE, rebranding it as "Radio La Guadalupana", bringing Radio 6-20 to an end after almost 75 years.
