= XHIPN-FM =

IPN radio station in Mexico City

- Mexico City; Mexico
- Frequency: 95.7 MHz (HD Radio)
- Branding: Radio IPN

Programming
- Language: Spanish
- Format: Public/cultural radio
- Subchannels: HD2: Alternative "Polifonia"; HD3: World music "Polimania"

Ownership
- Owner: Instituto Politécnico Nacional
- Sister stations: Canal Once

History
- First air date: 1984
- Former call signs: XHUPC-FM (1987–2019)
- Call sign meaning: Instituto Politécnico Nacional

Technical information
- Licensing authority: CRT
- Class: A
- ERP: 2,000 watts
- HAAT: 504.7 meters (1,656 ft)
- Transmitter coordinates: 19°31′58″N 99°07′50″W

Links
- Webcast: Listen live
- Website: ipn.mx/radio

XHIPN-FM (95.7 MHz), known as Radio IPN, is the radio station of the Instituto Politécnico Nacional in Mexico City. The studios are located at the IPN's Allende Continuing Education Center; the transmitter is located atop Cerro del Chiquihuite.

XHIPN-FM broadcasts in HD.

== History ==
Radio IPN traces its roots to 1984, when it was conceived as a teaching and instructional tool for students in the communications and electrical engineering programs. At that time, the IPN applied to the SCT in order to obtain a permit for the station and to begin intermittent operations on 95.7 MHz, which was issued on February 25, 1987. Located at the Unidad Profesional Culhuacán—later the Superior School of Mechanical and Electrical Engineering (ESIME) Culhuacán—it was given the call letters XHUPC-FM.

On September 5, 1994, XHUPC began offering regular programming 13 hours a day, five days a week. The station was known as "El Politécnico en Radio". In 1995, it added weekend programs, and 1997 saw XHUPC move to 24-hour operation.

In 2017, an administrative overhaul occurred at XHUPC as the result of the adoption of new bylaws governing the station. The change also saw new outside leadership be brought in. In November 2017, according to former station employees, the locks were changed. Said employees issued an open letter in which they decried the new leadership, hailing from Radio UNAM and UAM Radio, and the fact that an IPN alumnus was not leading the station, as had been the case during the more than 20-year leadership tenure of Ing. José Ramos Subirachs. They also declared that administration was seeking to "kidnap IPN culture". The new administration made the station more institutional in nature and rebranded it as "Radio IPN".

On March 7, 2019, the Federal Telecommunications Institute approved the change of the station's call letters to XHIPN-FM, in order to increase identification of the radio station with the IPN.

In 2023, the station began broadcasting from the Canal Once tower on Cerro del Chiquihuite, one of Mexico City's major broadcast tower sites.

== Programming ==
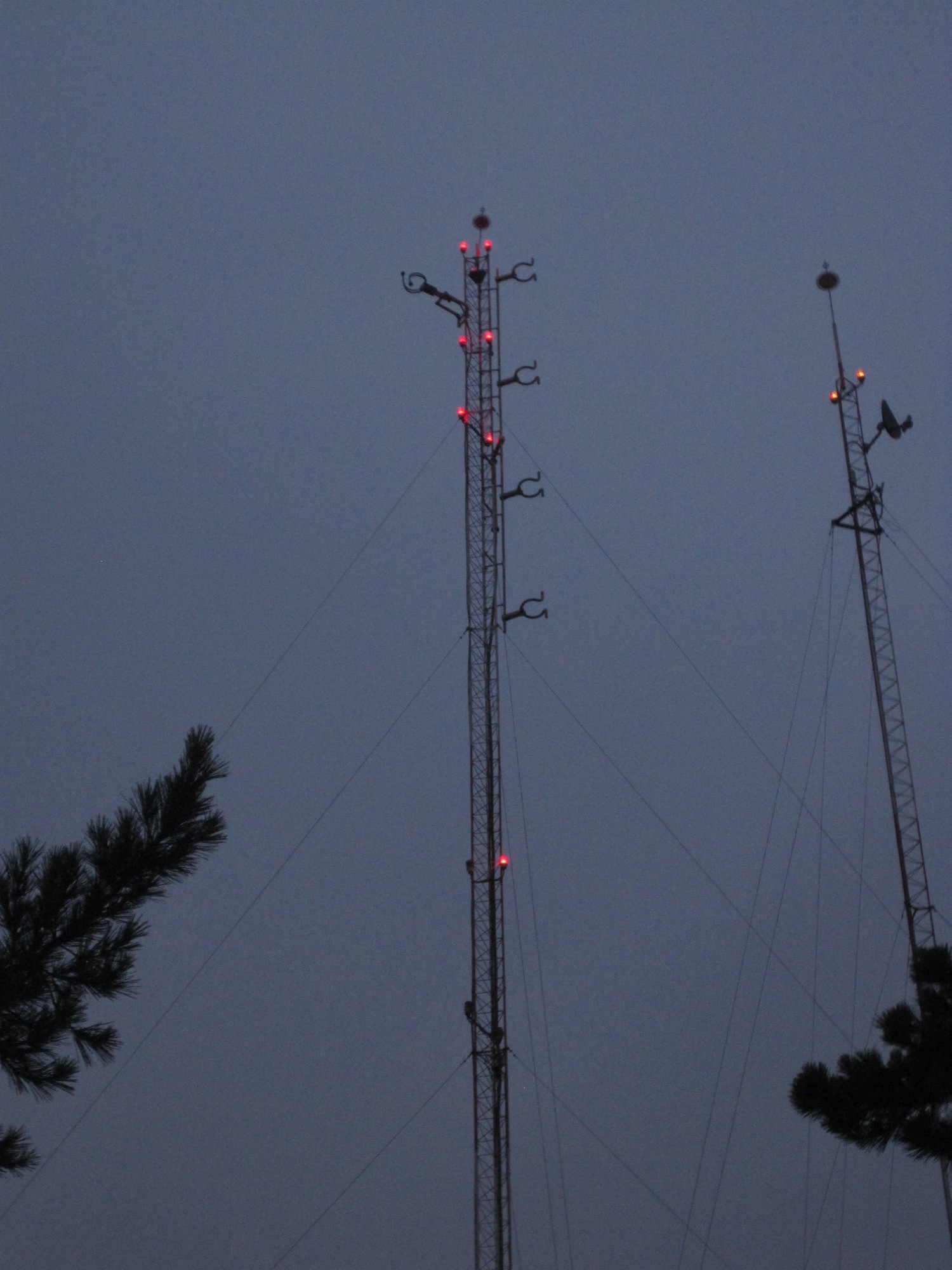
Former Radio IPN tower and antenna

XHIPN carries a wide variety of cultural programs, ranging from the station's own productions to programs supplied by Radio France International, as well as the audio of Once Noticias newscasts.
