= Grupo Radio Centro =

Mexican radio broadcaster

Grupo Radio Centro, S.A.B. de C.V.

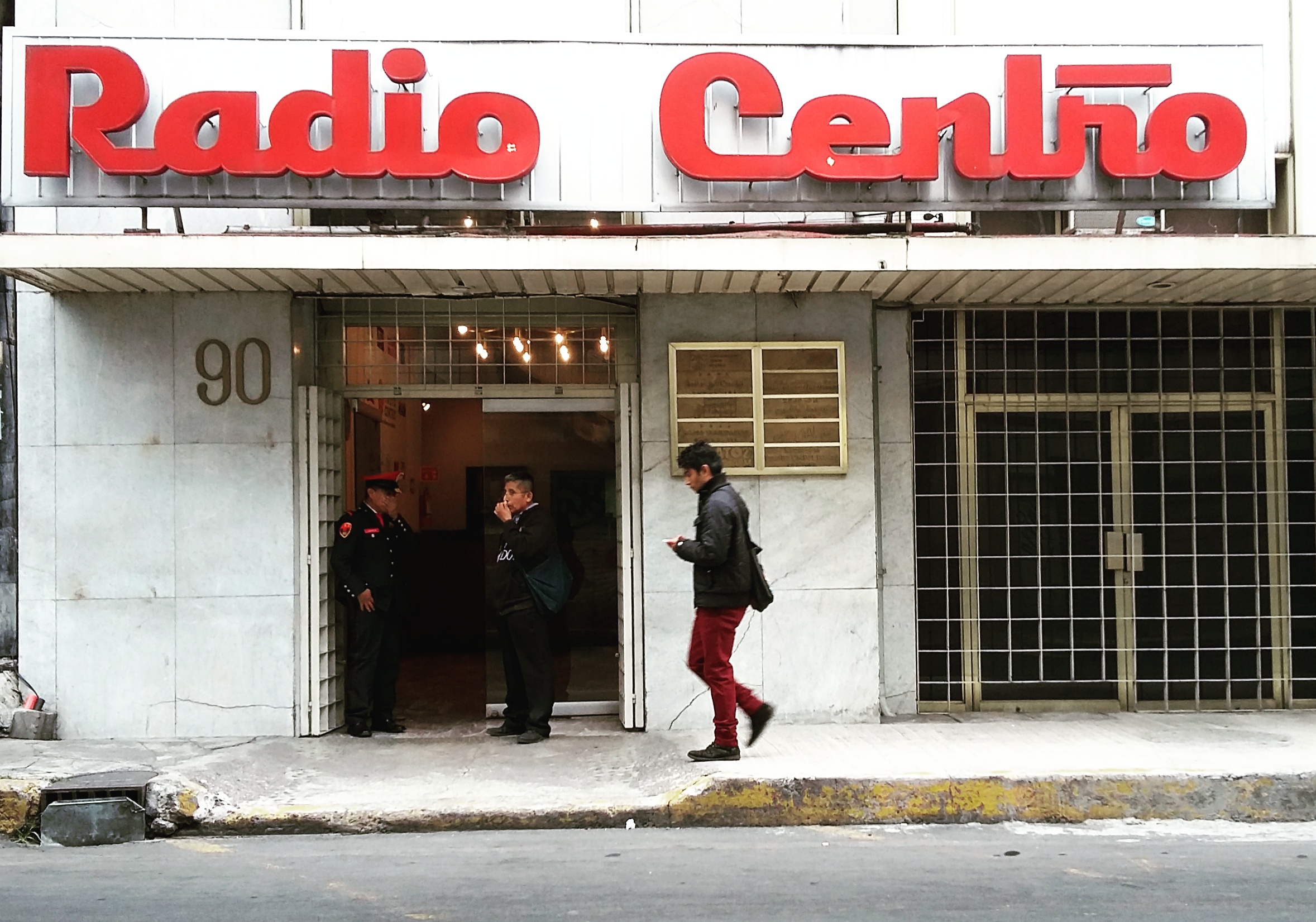
- Type: Sociedad Anónima Bursátil de Capital Variable
- Traded as: BMV: RCENTRO
- Industry: Broadcasting
- Founded: 1952 in Mexico City
- Headquarters: Mexico City
- Area served: Mexico and El Paso, Texas in the United States
- Key people: Francisco Aguirre Gómez; Managing Director Jacinto Marina
- Products: Radio stations
- Owner: Aguirre Gómez family
- Number of employees: 434 (2015)
- Website: radiocentro.com laoctava.com

Grupo Radio Centro is a Mexico City-based owner and operator of radio stations. It owns 30 radio stations in Mexico and the United States, including 8 radio stations in Mexico City.

== History ==
Radio Centro's origins date to 1946, when Francisco Aguirre Jiménez formed the Cadena Radio Continental to operate XEQR-AM 1030 and new station XERC-AM 790 in Mexico City. Organización Radio Centro was formed in 1952, and the current company was founded in 1971.

In 1965, it founded OIR (Organización Impulsora de la Radio), which syndicates Radio Centro's formats to stations across Mexico. Its non-Mexico City business extended further in the 1980s, when Radio Centro began selling its formats outside the United States (in 1983) and created Cadena Radio Centro (in 1986) to manage this portion of its operations. Meanwhile, in Mexico City, it had expanded to five AM stations and three new FM outlets. Radio Centro was the second media company to place its FM towers on Cerro del Chiquihuite, to the north of the city, though they are now located elsewhere.

In 1994, it sold Cadena Radio Centro, picked up (and promptly shed) an investment in Heftel Broadcasting (now known as Univision Radio), and bought 33% of Radiodifusión Red (which it would later own outright). The absorption of Radiodifusión Red, also known as Radio Programas de México, brought three additional Mexico City stations into Radio Centro's stable.

It also built a new building on the west side of Mexico City, known as the Trébol Radio Centro (or "Radio Centro Clover") in 1993. It also launched an initial public offering on the BMV (where Grupo Radio Centro stock continues to trade) and the NYSE (where it delisted in 2013).

In May 2000, Televisa attempted to buy GRC and announced an agreement in principle for a merger, but the acquisition failed due to marketplace concerns. The Federal Competition Commission recommended that Televisa sell some stations, and ultimately four months after the announcement, talks ended. Other reasons for the acquisition's failure included dissent within the Aguirre family and a dispute over GRC's valuation. Another roadblock was that newscaster José Gutiérrez Vivó, who hosted the Monitor newscasts on Radio Red, refused to work with Televisa.

In 2012, GRC acquired 25% of KXOS FM in Los Angeles, three years after signing a local marketing agreement to take control of the station's programming.

On March 11, 2015, Radio Centro won one of two concession packages to build and operate a national television network. However, Radio Centro ended up not paying the 3 billion pesos to secure the concession.

Seeking to limit costs after the television concession fiasco, in June 2015, shareholders approved a merger of Radio Centro with Controladora Radio México and GRM Radiodifusión, two components of Grupo Radio México. The merger added 30 radio stations to Grupo Radio Centro's portfolio and marks its first major expansion outside of Mexico City.

In November 2016, GRC took control of Univision Radio's El Paso cluster, consisting of KBNA-FM, KQBU and KAMA, by local marketing agreement, and filed with the FCC to buy 25% of the stations, with the remaining shares being held by a US citizen.

On November 27, 2017, a fire affected the company's main offices, forcing it to briefly suspend the broadcasts of all its Mexico City stations and relocate to an alternate site.

== Stations ==
=== Mexico City ===
- XEN-AM 690
- XEQR-AM 1030
- XERED-AM 1110
- XHRED-FM 88.1
- XHFAJ-FM 91.3
- XEJP-FM 93.7
- XEQR-FM 107.3

=== Guadalajara ===
- XEDKR-AM 700 (repeater of XHRED-FM)

=== Monterrey ===
- XEH-AM 1420 (License and permission expired since 2016)
- XESTN-AM 1540 (repeater of XHRED-FM)
- XHQQ-FM 93.3 (License and permission expired since 2016)

=== Los Mochis ===
- XHECU-FM 91.7
- XHCW-FM 96.5
- XHORF-FM 99.7
- XHPNK-FM 103.5

=== Off air ===
- XHKF-FM 90.5 Iguala, Gro.
- XERC-AM 790 Mexico City

=== Former stations ===
==== Mexico City ====
- XHFO-FM 92.1 Mexico City (owned by Grupo Siete, operated by GRC from 1993 to 2019)
- XEEST-AM 1440 (1961–2019, operated by Grupo Siete beginning in 1996, sold to Grupo Siete in 2019)
- XEINFO-AM 1560 (1979–2000; 2011-2017, passed to Infored, in turn sold to Eduardo Henkel; migrated to 105.3 FM)
- XEJP-AM 1150 (1955–2020, sold to Grupo Acustik)
- XENET-AM 1320 (1958–2000, passed to Infored, went defunct in 2008)
- XERC-FM 97.7 (1974–2020, sold to MVS Radio)

==== Guadalajara ====
- XEUNO-AM 1120 (1992–2020, sold to Grupo Acustik)
- XHDK-FM 94.7 (owned by Grupo Radiorama, operated by GRC from 2002 to 2020)
- XHKB-FM 99.9 (sold to Multimedios Radio)
- XHVOZ-FM 107.5 Guadalajara (sold to Grupo Audiorama Comunicaciones)

==== Monterrey ====
- XEFB-AM 630 Monterrey (1973–2023, sold to Grupo Acustik)
- XHSP-FM 99.7 Monterrey (1973–2021, sold to El Heraldo de México)
- XHMF-FM 104.5 (owned by Grupo Radiorama, operated by GRC from 1999 to 2025)

==== Ciudad Juarez ====
Note: All these concessions are held by both Grupo Radiorama and Grupo Audiorama Comunicaciones.

- XEJ-AM 970 (Owned by Grupo Audiorama Comunicaciones, operated by GRC from 2001 to 2026)
- XEPZ-AM 1190 (Owned by Grupo Radiorama, operated by GRC from 2010 to 2022)
- XEP-AM 1300 (Owned by Grupo Radiorama, operated by GRC from 2001 to 2015)
- XHEPR-FM 99.1 (Owned by Grupo Radiorama, operated by GRC from 2010 to 2017, and then from 2021 to 2022).
- XHEM-FM 103.5 and XEJCC-AM 720 (Owned by Grupo Audiorama Comunicaciones, operated by GRC from 2001 to 2026, She is currently still an affiliate)
- XHTO-FM 104.3 (Owned by Grupo Audiorama Comunicaciones, operated by GRC from 2010 to 2026)
- XHIM-FM 105.1 (Owned by Grupo Radiorama, operated by GRC from 2001 to 2015, and then from 2017 to 2019)
- XHNZ-FM 107.5 (Owned by Grupo Radiorama, operated by GRC from 2001 to 2015)

==== Torreón ====
All these stations are sold to Multimedios Radio, with only one exception:

- XHETOR-FM 99.9
- XHRCA-FM 102.7
- XHWN-FM 93.9
- XHETB-FM 89.1 and XETB-AM 1350 Torreón (sold to Grupo Zócalo)

==== Cancún ====
- XHPBCQ-FM 94.9 (2019–2022, sold to Promo Éxitos)
- XHCCQ-FM 91.5 (owned by Grupo Radiorama, operated by GRC from 2009 to 2022)

==== Other cities ====
- XEAZ-AM 1270 Tijuana (2008–2021, Sold to PSN)
- XHRPO-FM 97.7 Oaxaca (sold to El Heraldo de México)
- XHKC-FM 100.9 Oaxaca (sold to Grupo Radio Cañon)
- XHRPU-FM 102.9 Durango (sold to Multimedios Radio)
- XHRRF-FM 88.5 Mérida (operated to Peninsula Studios)
- XHXV-FM 88.9 León (sold to Grupo Radiorama)
- XHYK-FM 101.5 Mérida (operated to Peninsula Studios)
- XHPSFC-FM 94.1 Campeche (2019–2022, sold to Telesur)

==== United States ====
All these stations had 25% ownership, In the case of El Paso stations, they were under 97.5 Licensee TX, LLC. created in 2016 after the acquisition of El Paso-licensed Univision Radio stations.

- KXOS-FM 93.9 Los Angeles (2009–2019, sold to Meruelo Group)
- KBNA-FM 97.5 El Paso (2016-2020, sold to Luz María Rygaard)
- K224FC-FM 92.7 and KAMA AM 750 El Paso (2016-2020, sold to Luz María Rygaard)
- KQBU AM 920 El Paso (2016-2020, sold to Luz María Rygaard)

=== Defunct ===
- XEAA-AM 1340 Mexicali, B.C.
- XEMN-AM 600 Monterrey

=== Non-radio ===
Radio Centro owned XHDF-TV channel 13 in Mexico City from its 1968 launch to 1972, when it was expropriated by state financier SOMEX. In 2017, GRC's owner, Francisco Aguirre Gómez, won the concession for XHFAMX-TDT, which launched on October 31, 2019 being operated by GRC. XHFAMX was sold in 2022 to Grupo Andrade, owners of El Heraldo de México.
