= XHCDMX-FM =

Feminist community radio station in Mexico City

- Mexico City; Mexico
- Frequency: 106.1 FM
- Branding: Violeta Radio

Programming
- Format: Community radio (feminist)

Ownership
- Owner: Alianza por el Derecho Humano de las Mujeres a Comunicar, A.C.

History
- First air date: March 2019
- Last air date: October 14, 2024
- Call sign meaning: CDMX, an abbreviation for Ciudad de México (Mexico City)

Technical information
- Class: A
- ERP: 3 kW
- HAAT: -43.4 m
- Transmitter coordinates: 19°23′01.6″N 99°10′09.9″W

Links
- Website: violetaradio.org

XHCDMX-FM, known as Violeta Radio, was a community radio station on 106.1 FM in Mexico City. The station described itself as a "feminist" radio station; its concession was held by Alianza por el Derecho Humano de las Mujeres a Comunicar, A.C. ("Alliance for the Human Right of Women to Communicate"), a civil association formed by several women's organizations and activists. The concession was awarded in 2017, and XHCDMX-FM began broadcasting in March 2019. The station's concession was surrendered to the Federal Telecommunications Institute on October 14, 2024, amid a dispute between members of the civil association.

== History ==
In 2016, the Federal Telecommunications Institute (IFT) reduced mandatory station spacing on the FM band from 800 kHz to 400 kHz; this, along with the 2014 designation of 106-108 MHz as a reserved band for community and indigenous radio stations and the 2013 recognition of such stations in broadcasting law, opened the door for two new radio stations to be awarded in Mexico City.

The concessionaire was formed by two civil associations—Salud Integral para la Mujer, A.C. (SIPAM) and Comunicación e Información de la Mujer, A.C. (CIMAC)—as well as Aimée Vega Montiel, a researcher at the UNAM Center for Interdisciplinary Studies in the Sciences and Humanities (CEIICH), to pursue one of the new frequencies to be made available, filing an application in May 2016. On August 23, 2017, the IFT's seven commissioners voted unanimously to award a concession to Alianza por el Derecho Humano de las Mujeres a Comunicar for Mexico City's first licensed community radio station. The concession was formally received on November 29, allowing Alianza to begin construction of the station. XHCDMX-FM was initially projected to sign on in early 2018.

As a radio station operated by women, its most significant antecedent was XEMX-AM 1380 "Radio Femenina", which operated with a format of programs oriented toward women between 1952 and 1960, but was owned by men. As a community station, it joins several licensed stations in the Valley of Mexico, all operating in suburbs within the State of Mexico, including XHNEZ-FM and XHARO-FM in Ciudad Nezahualcóyotl; XHOEX-FM in Texcoco; and XHCHAL-FM in Chalco.

On February 27, 2018, Violeta Radio held a presentation at the Memory and Tolerance Museum to present the new station. At the event, an agreement with Radio Educación was announced by which XHCDMX's antenna would be mounted on the same tower as Radio Educación's FM station. However, Violeta Radio did not construct its facility in 2018 (XHEP-FM itself did not sign on until November). In February 2019, in an interview with El Economista newspaper, new Radio Educación director Gabriel Sosa Plata said that while there had been some delays on Violeta Radio's part, the station was expected to hit the air in May, though XHCDMX began testing on March 14.

The concession for XHCDMX-FM was submitted to the IFT for cancellation on October 14, 2024. The surrender was made by SIPAM representative María Eugenia Chávez Fonseca ahead of a planned meeting of members of the association where—according to her—CIMAC and Vega planned to strip her of her power amid years of bad relations between CIMAC and SIPAM over the operation of the station, which SIPAM felt CIMAC dominated. In an interview with El Economista, Chávez believed that "the right thing to do was to take away the apple of discord" and surrender the concession, continuing Violeta Radio online only. CIMAC, which in a statement said it only learned of the surrender in the press, decried SIPAM's "unilateral" surrender decision as an attack against the station's values as well as against "pluralism and diversity, cornerstone of community media, and the rights of audiences".

== Programming ==
In an interview, Maru Chávez of SIPAM stated that the station was designed as a "counterweight to gender stereotypes" and will feature a variety of programs, including news, from a gender perspective. Vega Montiel described the objective of Violeta Radio as "to produce programs that are useful to women, teens and girls, that discuss human and reproductive rights, labor rights, the right to education". Most of XHCDMX's programming at sign-on was to be recorded in Radio Educación studios, but the station moved several times due to disputes among its owners.
