= XEQR-AM =

Radio station in Mexico City

- Mexico City; Mexico
- Frequency: 1030 kHz
- Branding: Radio Centro 1030

Programming
- Format: Oldies and standards in Spanish

Ownership
- Owner: Grupo Radio Centro; (XEQR, S.A. de C.V.)
- Sister stations: XHRED-FM, XHFAJ-FM, XEJP-FM, XEQR-FM, XEN-AM, XERC-AM, XERED-AM,

History
- First air date: January 1, 1931

Technical information
- Licensing authority: CRT
- Class: B
- Power: 50,000 watts (day); 5,000 watts (night)
- Transmitter coordinates: 19°22′26.6″N 99°06′34.2″W
- Repeater: 107.3 XEQR-HD2 (Mexico City)

Links
- Webcast: Listen live
- Website: radiocentro1030.mx

XEQR-AM (branded as Radio Centro 1030) is a radio station based in Mexico City. It is owned by Grupo Radio Centro, broadcasting an oldies and adult standards format in Spanish.

== History ==
XEFO-AM signed on January 1, 1931, as the radio station of the National Revolutionary Party (later the PRI). In 1941, the PRN sold the station to Francisco Aguirre Jiménez. From 1030 AM he would build a broadcasting empire initially known as "Cadena Radio Continental", starting with XERC-AM in 1946 and growing into today's Grupo Radio Centro. That same year, the station took on the name "Radio Centro", branding as "the station of the Mexican family" and positioned itself as a general station similar to XEW-AM; while airing musical programming for most of its existence, in the 1980s, information and entertainment programs were added, and by 1998 non-talk programming had disappeared. Newscasts and sport programs were also present, but were later moved to Radio Red AM and Radio Red FM. In its final years as a talk station, the station aired programs focused on self-help and motivation, hosted by professionals in the topic, and it also aired the live Sunday noon mass from the Mexico City Metropolitan Cathedral (which in 2017 moved to the Basilica of Our Lady of Guadalupe).

In 2017, citing "changes in AM transmission infrastructure", Grupo Radio Centro reorganized all of its AM radio stations, shutting down several and consolidating their programs. Radio Centro's talk programming, of which only two programs ("Club Nocturno" and "Buenos Días", the former of which was cancelled in 2019) survived the transition, went on to share XEN-AM 690 with Spanish oldies format El Fonógrafo, which had been on XEJP-AM 1150. XEQR then went silent. Beginning on October 2, 2017, the full slate of talk programming returned as an online and HD Radio-only stream, which only lasted less than two months after a fire affected GRC's headquarters. It wouldn't be until March 2019 when the station's stream returned, although not with all the programming it had prior to 2017. In August, the format absorbed the programming of sister station XERED-AM (which had also become an online-only stream) unifying it under the "Radio Centro 1030" name.

On April 11, 2020 it returned to the air, however, the next day, it switched from the talk format to a simulcast of XERC-FM, the English classic hits format "Universal", and on May 15, concurrent with the announcement that XERC-FM was being sold to MVS Radio, the Internet stream was shut down with all their collaborators dismissed. On May 18, XEQR switched again to a simulcast of XEN-AM. From July 2020 until June 2022, the station broke away from XEN to air sports programming at certain times and days simply branding itself as "1030 AM", but otherwise remained a simulcast.

On June 18, 2022, XEQR rebranded as sports format "Radio Centro Deportes" and stopped simulcasting XEN.

On August 7, 2023, XEQR retook the "Radio Centro 1030" name and a primarily musical format, airing an oldies and adult standards format primarily in Spanish but also some in English, consisting mostly in music such as bolero, mariachi, big band, rock and roll, ranchera, mambo, trío romántico, which is the format XEQR had from the 1960s until the early 1990s, and was also the original "El Fonógrafo" format from the 1990s and 2000s. With the relaunch, the "Buenos Días" morning talk program returned to XEQR.

"Buenos Días" ended its 23-year GRC run on January 17, 2026, leaving the station as a music-only format with no on-air personalities until May 14, when a new morning show called "Variedades matutinas" started airing.
