= XENET-AM =

Former AM radio station in Mexico City

Defunct
- Mexico City; Mexico
- Broadcast area: Greater Mexico City
- Frequency: 1320 kHz

Ownership
- Owner: Emisora 1320, S.A. de C.V.

History
- First air date: December 1, 1942
- Last air date: May 23, 2008
- Former call signs: XEAI-AM (1942–1974), XECMQ-AM (1974–1997), XEJP-AM (1997–2004)
- Call sign meaning: net, English for RED, referring to its final owner InfoRED

Technical information
- Class: B
- Power: 20 kW day 10 kW night

XENET-AM was a radio station in Mexico City. Located on 1320 kHz, XENET-AM was owned by Emisora 1320, S.A. de C.V. The station signed off the air on May 23, 2008, and its concession expired on July 3, 2016.

== History ==
The concession for 1320 AM in Mexico City was originally awarded to Carmen Gutiérrez Trejo, with the callsign of XEAI. The station was eventually sold to Corporación Nacional de Radio y Televisión, S.A. and became part of Grupo Radio Centro, originally having a tropical music format known as "Radio AI". In 1974, the station became XECMQ-AM and "Radio Sensación", broadcasting ballad music in Spanish. In 1993, "Formato 21", a news format, replaced it.

In 1997, 1150 AM swapped callsigns and formats with 1320 AM, with this frequency becoming XEJP-AM and taking on 1150's longtime "Radio Variedades" format.

In a 1998 contract, Grupo Radio Centro announced the transfer of XEJP-AM 1320 and XEFAJ-AM 1560 (now XEINFO-AM) to José Gutiérrez Vivó, journalist and producer of the Monitor newscast, then heard on Radio Centro's XERED-AM and XHRED-FM. Infored took over operation of the station in April 2000 and relaunched it in November of the same year, hoping to reach a young audience as "Track 13-20" with a rock format. In 2004, however, Radio Centro and Monitor parted ways, and this station became XENET-AM with the name Radio Bienestar, offering self-help and motivational programming.

From 2006 to 2008, XENET-AM simulcasted XEINFO-AM. However, in June 2007, the legal fighting between Radio Centro and Monitor, which had severely hurt the latter's finances, forced the suspension of programming of both 1320 and 1560 AM from June 29 until September 3 (during that time, both stations only aired instrumental music and occasional news updates). Radio Centro was owed more than $100 million. On April 10, 2008, XEINFO broke off because that station was sold to Eduardo Henkel Rojas. However, the final blow for Radio Monitor came when workers of STIRT, Mexico's radio and television labor union, went on strike. On May 23, 2008, STIRT, whose members were angry about unpaid wages, raised its red and black flags at Radio Monitor, and both stations went off the air. The station's last program was the noon edition of Monitor hosted by Héctor Jiménez Landín, who in the last minutes of the newscast read a statement announcing the strike and total suspension of programming, thanking the audience for almost 34 years of listening to Monitor.

The InfoRed strike ended on July 12, 2017; however, XENET's concession was not renewed, and it consequently expired as of July 3, 2016.

In October 2021, XEARZ-AM was relocated to the 1320 AM frequency.
