= XHINFO-FM =

Radio station in Mexico City

- Mexico City; Mexico
- Broadcast area: Greater Mexico City
- Frequency: 105.3 FM (HD Radio)
- Branding: Chilango Radio

Programming
- Format: Talk radio/alternative rock

Ownership
- Owner: Eduardo Henkel Rojas; (XEFAJ, S.A. de C.V.)
- Operator: Capital Digital

History
- Former call signs: XERMK-AM (1962–1966); XEVIP-AM (1966–1979); XEFAJ-AM (1979–2004); XEINFO-AM (2004–2019)
- Former frequencies: 1560 kHz (1962–2019)
- Call sign meaning: Station was owned by Infored in the 2000s

Technical information
- Licensing authority: CRT
- Class: A
- ERP: 1.15 kW
- HAAT: −22.3 meters (−73 ft)
- Transmitter coordinates: 19.3945°N 99.1744°W

Links
- Webcast: Listen live
- Website: radiochilango.com

XHINFO-FM (105.3 FM) is a radio station in Mexico City. XHINFO-FM is owned by XEFAJ, S.A. de C.V., a company controlled by Eduardo Henkel Rojas. It is presently operated by Capital Digital, owner of Chilango magazine, and is known as Chilango Radio.

XHINFO-FM broadcasts in HD.

Established in the early 1960s as an AM station on 1560 kHz, today's XHINFO has had a turbulent history. In the 2000s, an agreement by longtime owner Grupo Radio Centro to spin the station off to José Gutiérrez Vivó, host of the Monitor newscast, ended in a split and years of lawsuits that dragged the station off the air. However, a sale to Henkel, who had been a creditor, led to an interim operation through most of the 2010s. In 2017, XEINFO-AM won the only slot for a commercial Mexico City station to migrate to FM and began FM broadcasting the next year under an agreement with a company that programmed the station as "Aire Libre" with an indie and eclectic music format. A further dispute between the two parties led to Aire Libre being forced off the air in late 2021. Three different formats have aired on the station since the Aire Libre dispute.

== History ==
=== Early years and Radio Centro operation ===
The concession for 1560 AM at Ciudad Satélite was originally awarded to Ruben Marín y Kall, with the callsign of XERMK-AM, in a concession dated January 26, 1962. The station was sold in 1966 to Clemente Serna Alvear and his Radio Programas de México and relaunched as English-language station XEVIP-AM in April 1966, becoming an affiliate of CBS Radio that July—its first in Latin America.

In 1979, Grupo Radio Centro bought the station, changed its calls to XEFAJ-AM in honor of their recently deceased founder Francisco Aguirre Jiménez, and introduced a regional Mexican format under the name "Radio Consentida". In 1983, the concession passed to Radio Industrial de la Provincia, S.A. de C.V.

=== Infored/Monitor years ===
In a 1998 contract, Grupo Radio Centro announced the transfer of XEJP-AM 1320 (now XENET-AM) and XEFAJ-AM 1560 to José Gutiérrez Vivó, journalist and producer of the Monitor newscasts, then heard on Radio Centro's XERED-AM and XHRED-FM. Infored took over operation of the station in April 2000, changing its name in November to "La Banda 15-60" where it broadcast grupera music. In 2004, the station changed calls again, this time to XEINFO-AM, and the station returned to a news format as "Radio Monitor" when Radio Centro and Monitor parted ways.

From 2006 to 2008, XENET-AM simulcasted XEINFO-AM. However, in June 2007, the legal fighting between Radio Centro and Monitor, which had severely hurt the latter's finances, forced the closure of both 1320 and 1560 AM from June 29 until September 3. Radio Centro was owed more than $100 million. On April 10, 2008, a sale was made to a creditor, Eduardo Henkel Rojas, (Note: In a 2017 note to El Financiero, Henkel noted that the acquisition was agreed in September 2007 and approved by Cofetel in December of the same year.) but the sale reportedly could not be completed because workers of STIRT, Mexico's radio and television labor union, went on strike. Unlike XENET, which remained on-air until May 23, 2008 when the STIRT, whose members were angry about unpaid wages, raised its red and black flags at Radio Monitor, XEINFO suspended its programming on the day of the attempted sale and was off the air for nearly three years.

=== Interim operations and silence ===
"La Mexicana" logo

On March 19, 2011, XEINFO returned to the air with regional Mexican music. However, there were no commercials or branding, not even airing government or electoral spots, with the station only known by its call letters and frequency. The station's sparse identifications mentioned Grupo Radio Centro's control of the station, but such was never publicly confirmed or acknowledged by the company, nor mentioned on its website. Eventually, XEINFO went off the air again.

In April 2017, a definitive court ruling against Gutiérrez Vivó opened the door for the station's future to be resolved. On May 15, 2017, coinciding with a major reshuffle of Grupo Radio Centro's AM radio stations, the format of XEEST-AM 1440, operated by Grupo Siete under contract to GRC, was moved to 1560 kHz, marking its first regular broadcasts in more than nine years; the station returned to XEEST on October 2 of that year and XEINFO went off the air again.

=== AM-FM migration and relaunch as Aire Libre ===
As part of the second wave of AM-FM migration in Mexico, XEINFO was selected as the lone commercial AM station in Mexico City to move to the FM band. It will broadcast as XHINFO-FM on 105.3 MHz. The new station could have a maximum effective radiated power of 3,000 watts and must broadcast in HD Radio as one of the conditions of second-wave migration.

The selection of XEINFO triggered some dissatisfaction from the other AM-only commercial radio broadcasters, who had expected to go into a random drawing as provided for by the rules for second-wave migration. In the wake of the ruling, Capital Media, owners of competing applicant XEITE-AM, published several articles critical of the Federal Telecommunications Institute (IFT) in its newspaper, among other criticisms.

Meanwhile, Henkel, operating the radio station directly for the first time since acquiring it, began building a team and facilities. José Álvarez, who gained fame as the program director of the legendary Radioactivo in the 1990s and early 2000s, was hired to run the new station. The project also brought on board José Luis Fernández Prieto and Rodrigo González Calvillo, who brought with them the radio station they had won in the IFT-4 radio station auction of 2017, XHPTUL-FM 94.7 in Tulum, Quintana Roo, which will simulcast XHINFO.

On June 21, 2018, the IFT approved the final technical parameters for the station, including a transmitter location in the Atlazolpa area of Mexico City with an effective radiated power of 2,000 watts. On August 9, test transmissions began for XHINFO-FM.

Aire Libre held a formal press conference on October 25, 2018, to announce its formal programming with a November 1 launch date. At the conference, Víctor Trujillo was announced as the station's morning show host, while programs helmed by Ilana Sod, who had previously worked at Radioactivo, and Jordi Soler, who would host a show from Barcelona, were also revealed. Trujillo left after one year citing mental health reasons.

The AM station was turned off in November 2019 after the required year of simulcasting.

In August 2020, La Prensa reported that the IFT and the Unidad de Inteligencia Financiera (Financial Intelligence Unit) were investigating Aire Libre for concessionaire Henkel's connections to Radio Centro in light of the second-wave migration process, in addition to a challenge being mounted by Capital Media. According to Raymundo Riva Palacio, Capital had considered mounting an earlier challenge, but the Maccise family, politically connected to the Institutional Revolutionary Party and close to then-president Enrique Peña Nieto, was instructed by Peña Nieto to hold back to avoid a dispute with his then-wife, Angélica Rivera.

=== 105.3 Digital and La Nueva Radio ===
On December 10, 2021, due to a legal conflict between Aire Libre and Henkel, the IFT shut down the former's transmitter while Henkel launched a new signal originating from a company-owned property in San Pedro de los Pinos broadcasting contemporary music in English and Spanish without branding. The San Pedro de los Pinos site was authorized as an auxiliary facility, with the main transmitter to be moved to the World Trade Center Mexico City. The station then eventually began broadcasting an English-language classic hits format known as 105.3 Digital. This lasted until July 19, 2022, when Salvador Pérez Habib took over operations and implemented the same "La Nueva Radio" name used at XHXV-FM in León, which he had purchased from Grupo Radio Centro. Darío Celis of El Financiero noted that Pérez was associated with Adrián Pereda López of Radiorama and that funding from the Green Party was involved as part of a "political project".

=== Radio Chilango ===
Capital Digital assumed operational control of XHINFO-FM on August 7, 2023 and formally relaunched it as Radio Chilango with a lineup of four new talk programs on weekdays beginning August 28.
