= XEQR-FM =

Radio station in Mexico City

- Mexico City; Mexico
- Frequency: 107.3 MHz (HD Radio)
- Branding: La Z

Programming
- Format: Regional Mexican
- Subchannels: HD2: XEQR-AM simulcast

Ownership
- Owner: Grupo Radio Centro; (XEQR-FM, S.A. de C.V.)
- Sister stations: XHRED-FM, XHFAJ-FM, XEJP-FM, XEN-AM, XERC-AM, XEQR-AM, XERED-AM,

History
- First air date: 1974

Technical information
- Licensing authority: CRT
- Class: C
- ERP: 92.32 kW
- HAAT: 559.43 meters (1,835.4 ft)
- Transmitter coordinates: 19°27′8.07″N 99°22′3.05″W

Links
- Website: laz.mx

XEQR-FM is a radio station in Mexico City. Located on 107.3 FM, XEQR-FM is owned by Grupo Radio Centro and carries a Regional Mexican format as "La Z".

XEQR-FM broadcasts in HD and carries two subchannels, known as La Z on HD1 and Radio Centro XEQR-AM on its HD2 signal. The transmitter is located atop a tower in La Mesa/Villa Alpina site at the outskirts west of Mexico City.

XEQR-FM was Mexico's top-rated radio station from 1999 to 2017.

== History ==
XEQR took to the air in 1974 — more than 10 years after receiving its concession on December 3, 1963 — with the name "Radio Universal" and a format of music in English from the 1950s and 1960s. In 1991, it became known as "Universal Stereo 107.3 FM" and picked up the long-running "El Club de los Beatles" program from XERC-AM, which ceased airing it when that station dropped the Radio Éxitos format.

On December 7, 1998, XEQR and XHFO-FM engaged in a format swap. XEQR picked up the Regional Mexican format "La Z" which had started its run on XHFO in 1993, while Universal Stereo was moved to XHFO.
