= List of radio stations in Puebla =

This is a list of radio stations in the Mexican state of Puebla, which can be sorted by their call signs, frequencies, location, ownership, names, and programming formats.

Radio stations in Puebla
Call sign	Frequency	Location	Owner	Name	Format
XEVJP-AM (Note: Linked to XHVJP-FM, which must keep XEVJP-AM on the air until there are no listeners in its service area unserved by other radio stations or the IFT orders it to cease to make way for a new station.)	570 AM	Xicotepec de Juárez	Radiodifusión de Xicotepec, S.A. de C.V.	Radio Xicotepec	
XECSCW-AM	910 AM	Tehuacán	Frecuencias Sociales, A.C.	—N/a	—N/a
XELFFS-AM	980 AM	Izúcar de Matamoros	Luis Francisco Fierro Sosa	—N/a	—N/a
XEPA-AM (Note: Linked to XHEPA-FM, which must keep XEPA-AM on the air until there are no listeners in its service area unserved by other radio stations or the IFT orders it to cease to make way for a new station.)	1010 AM	Puebla	José Asef Hanan Badri	Ke Buena	Regional Mexican
XEHR-AM	1090 AM	Puebla	Empresa Radiodifusora de Puebla XEHR, S.A. de C.V.	La HR	
XEPOP-AM	1120 AM	San José Xilotzingo	X.E.P.O.P., S.A. de C.V.	Red Ciudadana	News/talk
XECTZ-AM	1350 AM	Cuetzalan de Progreso	Instituto Nacional de los Pueblos Indígenas	La Voz de la Sierra Norte	Indigenous
XECSAO-AM	1400 AM	Ciudad Serdán	Alianza para la Educación y Cultura de Puebla, A.C.	—N/a	—N/a
XECCBC-AM	1600 AM	Ciudad Serdán	Jorge Iván Aguilar Velázquez	La Más Peligrosa	Regional Mexican
XHPCZA-FM	88.3 FM	Zacatlán	Daniel Carlos Cázares Álvarez	Única	Contemporary hit radio
XHIZM-FM	88.9 FM	Izúcar de Matamoros	Fundación General Francisco Hernández Domínguez, A.C.	La Revolucionaria	Variety
XHNP-FM	89.3 FM	Puebla	Operadora de Radio de Puebla, S.A. de C.V.	La Grupera	Regional Mexican
XHEPA-FM	89.7 FM	Puebla	José Asef Hanan Badri	Ke Buena	Regional Mexican
XHRS-FM	90.1 FM	Puebla	Organización Radio Oro, S. de R.L. de C.V.	Match	Contemporary hit radio
XHSCHX-FM	90.3 FM	Ciudad Serdán	Grupo de Comunicación del Valle de Serdán	TunIn Radio	Community radio
XHRTP-FM	90.7 FM	San Martin Texmelucan	XERTP, S.A. de C.V.	La Intensa	Regional Mexican
XHTCP-FM	90.7 FM	Tehuacán	XETCP-AM, S.A. de C.V.	Romántica	Romantic
XHTEZ-FM	90.9 FM	Teziutlán	Gobierno del Estado de Puebla	SICOM Radio	Public radio
XHFS-FM	91.1 FM	Izúcar de Matamoros	BAC Comunicaciones, S.A. de C.V.	La Mexicana	Regional Mexican
XHSIAE-FM	91.3 FM	Cuetzalan de Progreso	Radio Tosepan Limakxtum, A.C.	Radio Tosepan	Indigenous
XHPHBP-FM	91.7 FM	Huauchinango	Radio Huauchinango PZ, S.A. de C.V.	Ultra 91.7	Contemporary hit radio
XHRC-FM	91.7 FM	Puebla	XHRC-FM, S. de R.L. de C.V.	Mix	English adult contemporary
XHEG-FM	92.1 FM	Puebla	Radio Cañón, S.A. de C.V.	W Radio	News/talk
XHZM-FM	92.5 FM	Puebla	Ultradigital Puebla, S.A. de C.V.	Ultra	Contemporary hit radio
XHVJP-FM	92.7 FM	Xicotepec de Juárez	Radiodifusión de Xicotepec, S.A. de C.V.	Radio Xicotepec	
XHECD-FM	92.9 FM	Puebla	Radio Puebla, S.A.	Radio Disney	Contemporary hit radio
XHEUH-FM	93.1 FM	Tehuacán	Gobierno del Estado de Puebla	SICOM Radio	Public radio
XHLU-FM	93.5 FM	Ciudad Serdán	Víctor Manuel Bautista Paulino	Ke Buena	Regional Mexican
XHTEE-FM	93.9 FM	Tehuacán	Benemérita Universidad Autónoma de Puebla	Radio BUAP	University radio
XHJE-FM	94.1 FM	Puebla	Stereorey México, S.A.	Exa FM	Contemporary hit radio
XHPAOS-FM	94.5 FM	Acatlán de Osorio	Centrado Corporativo, S.A. de C.V.	Arre en Acustik	Regional Mexican
XHORO-FM	94.9 FM	Puebla	Corporación Radiofónica de Puebla, S.A.	Oro 94.9 Solo Hits	English classic hits
XHFJ-FM	95.1 FM	Teziutlán (Sección 23)	Radio Teziutlán, S.A. de C.V.	Ke Buena	Regional Mexican
XHAOP-FM	95.3 FM	Acatlán de Osorio	Gobierno del Estado de Puebla	SICOM Radio	Public radio
XHPXIC-FM	95.3 FM	Xicotepec de Juárez	Centrado Corporativo, S.A. de C.V.	Arre en Acustik	Regional Mexican
XHZT-FM	95.5 FM	Puebla	Radio Principal, S.A. de C.V.	La Magnífica	Regional Mexican
XHLIB-FM	95.9 FM	Libres, Ocotepec	Gobierno del Estado de Puebla	SICOM Radio	Public radio
XHEZAR-FM	96.1 FM	San Bernardino Tlaxcalancingo	Radio XEZAR, S.A. de C.V.	La 96 FM	Adult contemporary
XHBUAP-FM	96.9 FM	Puebla	Benemérita Universidad Autónoma de Puebla	Radio BUAP	University radio
XHPACP-FM	97.1 FM	Acatlán de Osorio	Luis Fernando Álvarez Laso	Radio TexMex	Regional Mexican
XHENG-FM	97.5 FM	Huauchinango	Radio Nueva Generación, S.A.	Ke Buena	Regional Mexican
XHPXA-FM	97.9 FM	San Miguel Xaltepec, Palmar de Bravo	Comunicadores Filo de Tierra Colorada, A.C.	Radio Xalli	Community radio
XHMAXX-FM	98.1 FM	San Martin Texmelucan	Radio XHMAXX, S.A. de C.V.	Stereo Max	Regional Mexican
XHPBA-FM	98.7 FM	Puebla	Radio Catedral, S.A. de C.V.	Los 40	Contemporary hit radio
XHCPCM-FM	98.9 FM	Huauchinango	Gobierno del Estado de Puebla	SICOM Radio	Public radio
XHTEU-FM	99.1 FM	Tehuacán	Radio Oriental, S.A. de C.V.	La Poderosa	Regional Mexican
XHOL-FM	99.7 FM	Chignautla	Radio Impacto, S.A.	Impacto FM	
XHEV-FM	99.9 FM	Izúcar de Matamoros	Radiodifusoras Capital, S.A. de C.V.	La Magnífica	Regional Mexican
XHTE-FM	99.9 FM	Tehuacan	Digital 99.9 Radiodifusores, S.A. de C.V.	Stereo Luz	
XHGY-FM	100.7 FM	Tehuacán	Grupo RadioTH Comunicaciones, S.A. de C.V.	La Mejor	Regional Mexican
XHVP-FM	101.3 FM	Atlixco	Radio X.H.V.P-FM, S.A. de C.V.	Sol FM	Regional Mexican
XHVC-FM	102.1 FM	Puebla	Radio XHVC-FM, S.A. de C.V.	La Tropical Caliente	Regional Mexican
XHWJ-FM	102.9 FM	Tehuacán	XEWJ Radio Popular, S.A. de C.V.	Exa FM	Contemporary hit radio
XHRH-FM	103.3 FM	Puebla	Radio XHRH-FM, S. de R.L. de C.V.	Amor	Romantic
XHCHP-FM	104.3 FM	Chignahuapan	Benemérita Universidad Autónoma de Puebla	Radio BUAP	University radio
XHPUE-FM	104.3 FM	Puebla	Operadora de Radio de Puebla, S.A. de C.V.	Pasión FM	Adult contemporary
XHOLA-FM	105.1 FM	Puebla	GIM Televisión Nacional, S.A. de C.V.	Imagen Radio	News/talk
XHZTP-FM	105.3 FM	Zacatlán	Gobierno del Estado de Puebla	SICOM Radio	Public radio
XHHIT-FM	105.5 FM	San Bernardino Tlaxcalancingo	Radio Poblana, S. de R.L. de C.V.	La Comadre	Regional Mexican
XHCOM-FM	105.9 FM	Santa Isabel Cholula	Gobierno del Estado de Puebla	SICOM Radio	Public radio
XHETE-FM	106.3 FM	Tehuacán	AM de Tehuacán, S.A. de C.V.	Vive FM	Adult contemporary
XHSCHY-FM	106.7 FM	Tlatlauquitepec	Rescate y Asistencia Médica Prehospitalaria, A.C.	La Poblanita de la Sierra	Community radio
XHPBP-FM	106.7 FM	Puebla	Fundación Cultural para la Sociedad Mexicana, A.C.	Radio María	Catholic
XHSBE-FM	107.1 FM	San Bernardino Tlaxcalancingo	Comunidades Indígenas de San Bernardino Tlaxcalancingo y Santa María Zacatepec	Cholollan Radio	Community radio
XHCPCL-FM	107.5 FM	Izúcar de Matamoros	Gobierno del Estado de Puebla	SICOM Radio	Public radio
