= XHIU-FM =

Radio station in Oaxaca, Oaxaca, Mexico

- Oaxaca, Oaxaca; Mexico
- Frequency: 105.7 MHz
- Branding: Sonido Crystal

Programming
- Format: Regional Mexican

Ownership
- Owner: Eduardo Horacio Septién Infante and José Horacio Septién Echegaray; (Radio XEIU, S.A. de C.V.)

History
- First air date: November 21, 1977 (concession); 1994 (FM)
- Former call signs: XEIU-AM
- Former frequencies: 990 kHz

Technical information
- Class: B1
- ERP: 10 kW
- HAAT: -80 m
- Transmitter coordinates: 17°04′11.2″N 96°43′55.7″W

Links
- Webcast: Listen live
- Website: sonidocrystal.com

XHIU-FM 105.7 is a radio station in Oaxaca, Oaxaca, Mexico, known as Sonido Crystal with a regional mexican format.

== History ==
XEIU received its first concession on November 21, 1977. It broadcast on 1160 kHz as a daytimer, moving to 990 sometime in the 1980s or 1990s and then adding an FM station in 1994.

For some time, XEIU/XHIU was operated by Grupo ACIR and was the market's home of ACIR's Amor format, which was moved to XHOCA-FM in 2017. The combo station was then relaunched as Stereo Cristal.

On May 1, 2019, Grupo Radiorama ASG took control of XEIU/XHIU, bringing it under common operation with XHEOA-FM, XHOQ-FM and XHYN-FM. Within weeks, the station rebranded as "Oreja Crystal".

The AM frequency was turned off on August 20, 2025.
