= Grupo ACIR =

Mexican media company

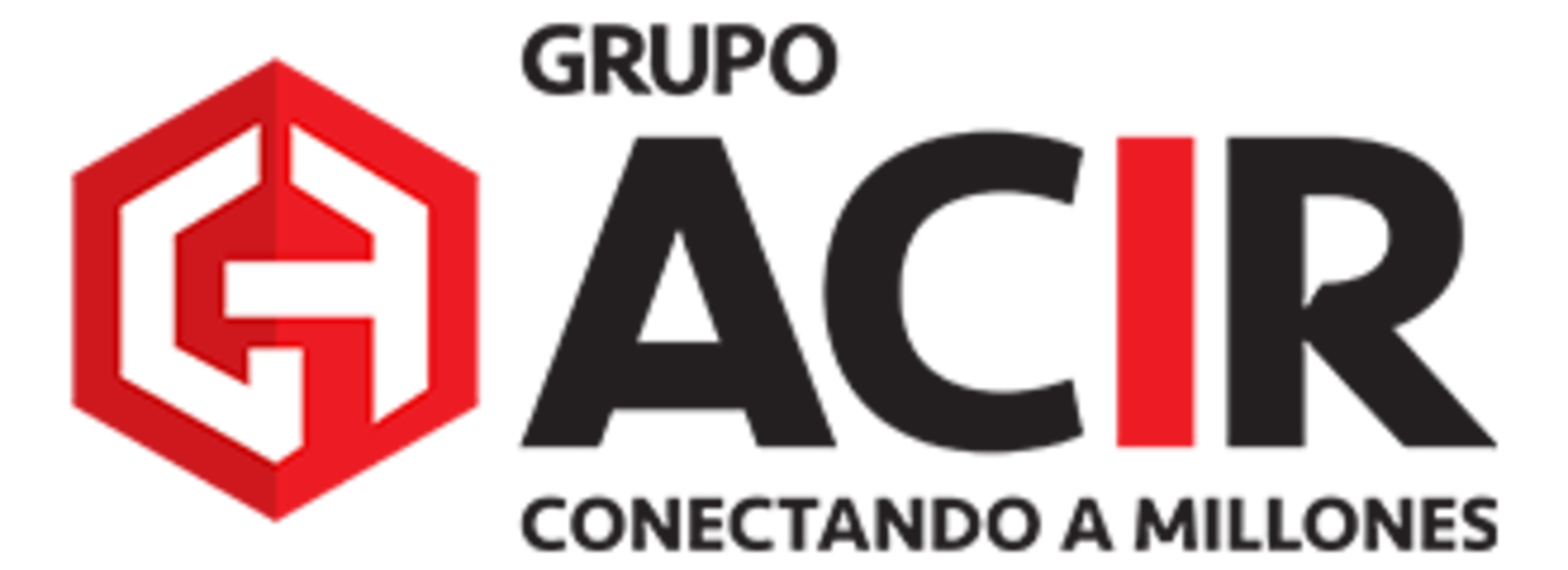
Grupo ACIR Logo

Grupo ACIR is a Mexican media company that specializes in the operation of radio stations. It was established in 1965. The acronym ACIR stands for Asociación de Concesionarios Independientes de Radio (Association of Independent Radio Concessionaires).

== History ==
Grupo ACIR was founded on June 8, 1965, when Francisco Ibarra acquired the XEDQ-AM (Radio Alegría) station in San Andrés Tuxtla, Veracruz.

Over the next two years, three additional stations were incorporated: XEOM-AM in Coatzacoalcos, Veracruz; XEMM-AM in Morelia, Michoacán; and XEMIA-AM in Guadalajara, Jalisco. The company also acquired three AM stations in Mexico City: XEL-AM (Radio Capital), XEFR-AM (Radio Felicidad), and XEVOZ-AM (Radio Voz).

By 1966, the group included 22 broadcasters, encompassing owned, managed, and affiliated stations. A distinctive feature of Grupo ACIR at the time was its comprehensive service model, offering sales, programming, engineering, and legal advisory support across its network.

In 1970, the group added XHSH-FM 95.3 MHz (Radio Amistad) in Mexico City. In 1976, Grupo ACIR Nacional was established to oversee and commercialise the group's stations nationwide.

With the adoption of new technologies, Radio Capital in Mexico City became the first station in Mexico to broadcast music using compact discs in 1983.

By 1984, Grupo ACIR had become the first Mexican radio group to operate 140 stations, following the acquisition of seven stations in cities including Delicias (Chihuahua), Puebla (Puebla), Puerto Vallarta (Jalisco), and Villahermosa (Tabasco).

In 1985, the group launched the news agency Radio Comunicación Humana, the precursor to ACIR Noticias. In 1986, ACIR SAT was founded as the first satellite-based radio link system in the country.

In 1987, Grupo HR, a Puebla-based company comprising XEHR-AM, XEPOP-AM, XHVC-FM, XHRC-FM, XHRH-FM, and XHJE-FM 94.1 MHz, joined Grupo ACIR.

On January 11, 1988, the program Espacio Deportivo, the first radio sports magazine in Mexico, began broadcasting. In 1989, the newscast Panorama Informativo was launched simultaneously on XEL-AM and XHSH-FM. It became the first long-format newscast broadcast nationally across over 70 stations. That same year, four new stations in Cancun, Quintana Roo, Mérida, Yucatán, and Valladolid, joined the network.

In the early 1990s, Grupo ACIR pioneered the use of mobile transmission units. In 1992, the group discontinued the use of LP records, transitioning fully to compact discs.

Throughout the 1990s, Grupo ACIR expanded its news programming, complementing Panorama Informativo with other notable broadcasts, including Vector XXI (hosted by José Cárdenas), Acir Radio Noticias, a total information system (with Ana Patricia Candiani and Jesús Martín Mendoza Arriola), and Invertir en México (hosted by Efrén Flores), the first radio program in Mexico focused on economics and finance.

By early 1995, Grupo ACIR included three stations from ARTSA in Mexico City: XHM-FM 88.9 MHz (Azul 89 (now 88.9 Noticias)), XHPOP-FM 99.3 MHz (Digital 99 (now Match FM)), and XHDFM-FM 106.5 MHz (Amor 106 (now Mix)).

In 1999, stations in Pachuca, Toluca, and Puebla were incorporated. Despite Grupo ACIR Puebla's presence, the group lacked full representation in the city and therefore partnered with Corporación Puebla de Radiodifusión for brand operations.

In 2003, Grupo ACIR introduced advanced audio broadcasting technology. That same year, two new formats launched: 88.9 Noticias (focused on news) and La 1260 (targeted at a female audience).

In 2004, the group launched the Radio Tráfico Total concept, delivering traffic updates every 15 minutes in cities such as Mexico City, Querétaro, Monterrey, Atlanta (USA), and San Diego (USA). That year, Grupo ACIR organised the first El Megaconcierto in Mexico City's Zócalo, drawing over 120,000 attendees. Attendance records were broken in subsequent years, with 145,000 in 2005 and 155,000 in 2006.

In 2005, XEPO-AM 1100 kHz (Inolvidable 1100 AM) in San Luis Potosí was sold to Controladora de Medios and converted into an Imagen Radio repeater. Grupo ACIR retained XHNB-FM 95.3 MHz, XHQK-FM 98.5 MHz, and XHTL-FM 99.3 MHz in the city.

In 2006, XEUM-AM 610 kHz in Valladolid, Yucatán, was sold to Cadena Rasa.

On June 1, 2007, Grupo ACIR Puebla was rebranded as Cinco Radio, becoming an independent consortium operated by the Cañedo Castillo family. Meanwhile, Corporación Puebla de Radiodifusión continued under the name Grupo ACIR.

As part of a strategic restructuring in 2009, several stations were disincorporated, including:

- XHRST-FM 107.7 (Tijuana)
- XHVI-FM 99.1 (San Juan del Río)
- XEZAR-AM 920 (Puebla)
- XEACA-AM 950 (Acapulco)
- XHCNE-FM 104.7 (Cananea)
- XHLDC-FM 90.7 (Magdalena)
- XHPPO-FM 93.5 (Puerto Peñasco)
- XHRCL-FM 89.5 (San Luis Río Colorado)
- XEEB-AM 760 and XEIQ-AM 960 (Ciudad Obregón)
- XEPJ-AM 1370 (Guadalajara)
- XEVOZ-AM 1590 (Mexico City)
- XEQY-AM 1200 (Toluca)
- XERZ-AM 1000 (León)
- XEEBC-AM 730 and XHAT-FM 101.1 (Ensenada)
- XHEPR-FM 99.1 (Ciudad Juárez)

In 2011, Grupo ACIR expanded to Zacatecas and Aguascalientes through an alliance with Grupo Radiofónico ZER. This partnership ended in 2017 due to internal disagreements.

In July 2013, XHM-FM changed its format to Siempre 88.9, featuring romantic music in Spanish. XHDFM-FM and XEFR-AM made minor changes to their music repertoires but retained their existing formats (Mix 106.5 FM and Radio Felicidad 1180 AM). XHPOP-FM rebranded as Radio Disney 99.3, maintaining a youth-oriented pop format. XHSH-FM and XEL-AM continued as Amor and La 1260, respectively.

Also in 2013, Grupo ACIR sold stations XHMT-FM 98.5 and XHYU-FM 100.1 in Mérida, and XHROOC-FM 101.7 in Chetumal to Sipse Radio.

In 2014, the group began expanding the Radio Disney brand in Mexico. The following year, the La 1260 format on XEL-AM was replaced by La Comadre.

In 2017, Grupo ACIR ceased operations at stations XHIU-FM 105.7 (Oaxaca), XHMY-FM 95.7 (Pachuca), and XHJHS-FM 101.1 (Querétaro).

In 2018, 88.9 Noticias returned, replacing Siempre 88.9 while maintaining the same programming. In April, the station in Guadalajara transitioned from XEMIA-AM 850 to XHEMIA-FM 90.3, and in June, XEOK-AM 900 in Monterrey became XHOK-FM 90.9, incorporating Radio Disney into its programming.

On December 24, 2019, Grupo ACIR ended its partnership with The Walt Disney Company México, discontinuing Radio Disney México. On December 25, Match FM was launched, officially debuting on January 7, 2020.

On July 31, 2021, XEL-AM's operation was transferred to Catholic broadcaster ESNE Radio, ending the broadcast of the La Comadre format in Mexico City. On January 1, 2022, it returned to a grupera music format.

Between 2020 and 2023, several stations were again disincorporated, including:

- XHVQ-FM 96.9 and XHMAT-FM 99.5 (Sinaloa)
- XHCIA-FM 91.7 and XHCOC-FM 99.7 (Colima)
- XHTL-FM 99.3 (San Luis Potosí)
- XHIL-FM 88.5 and XHCS-FM 103.7 (Veracruz)
- XHPVA-FM 90.3 (Puerto Vallarta)
- XHNE-FM 100.1 and XHOM-FM 107.5 (Coatzacoalcos)
- XHDQ-FM 103.9 (San Andrés Tuxtla)
- XHUSS-FM 92.3, XHFEM-FM 99.5 and XHDM-FM 102.7 (Hermosillo)
- XHOZ-FM 91.7 (Xalapa)
- XHAGS-FM 103.1 / XEAGS-AM 1070 (Acapulco)
- XHSAT-FM 90.1, XHOP-FM 96.5, and XHVILL-FM 103.3 (Villahermosa)
- XHOCA-FM 89.7 (Oaxaca)

Between 2024 and 2026, additional stations left the group, including:

- XHRE-FM 88.1 / XERE-AM 920 (Celaya)
- XHMAR-FM 98.5 / XEMAR-AM 710; XHBB-FM 101.5 / XEBB-AM 600; and XHAGE-FM 102.3 (Acapulco)
- XHTOL-FM 102.9 (Toluca)
- XHJTA-FM 94.3 and XHITO-FM 106.3 (Irapuato)
- XHOK-FM 90.9 (Monterrey)
- XHNB-FM 95.3 and XHQK-FM 98.5 (San Luis Potosí)
- XEL-AM 1260 (Mexico City)

== Coverage ==
The following tables show the coverage of the main commercial brands of Grupo ACIR in Mexico.

=== Amor ===
Population	Indicative(s)	Frequency(ies)
Guadalajara, Jalisco	XHPI-FM	93.1 MHz
Leon, Guanajuato	XHXF-FM	103.1 MHz
Mexico City	XHSH-FM	95.3 MHz
Puebla De Zaragoza, Puebla	XHRH-FM	103.3 MHz
Toluca, State of Mexico	XHRJ-FM	92.5 MHz

=== Mix ===
Population	Indicative (s)	Frequency (s)
Cancun, Quintana Roo	XHYI-FM / XEYI-AM	93.1 MHz / 580 kHz
Mexico City	XHDFM-FM	106.5 MHz
Morelia, Michoacán	XHEMM-FM	101.7 MHz
Pachuca, Hidalgo	XHPK-FM	92.5 MHz
Puebla de Zaragoza, Puebla	XHRC-FM	91.7 MHz
Querétaro, Querétaro	XHGV-FM	106.5 MHz
Puerto Vallarta, Jalisco	XHVAY-FM / XEVAY-AM	92.7 MHz / 740 kHz
Toluca, State of Mexico	XHENO-FM	90.1 MHz

=== La Comadre ===
Population	Indicative(s)	Frequency(s)
Culiacán, Sinaloa	XHCLI-FM	98.5 MHz
Pachuca, Hidalgo	XHRD-FM / XERD-AM	104.5 MHz / 1240 kHz
Puebla de Zaragoza, Puebla	XHHIT-FM	105.5 MHz + 105.5 HD1

=== Match ===
Current logo since January 7, 2020, in replacement of the Mexican version of Radio Disney.

Population	Indicative(s)	Frequency(s)
Culiacán, Sinaloa	XHCNA-FM	100.1 MHz
Guadalajara, Jalisco	XHEMIA-FM	90.3 MHz + 90.3 HD1
León, Guanajuato	XHPQ-FM	97.5 MHz
Mexico City	XHPOP-FM	99.3 MHz
Morelia, Michoacán	XHMO-FM	93.9 MHz
Puebla de Zaragoza, Puebla	XHRS-FM	90.1 MHz
Puerto Vallarta, Jalisco	XHME-FM	89.5 MHz
Querétaro, Querétaro	XHQTO-FM	97.9 MHz

=== Noticias ===
Population	Indicative(s)	Frequency(s)
Mexico City	XHM-FM	88.9 MHz

=== Radio Felicidad ===
Population	Indicative(s)	Frequency(s)
México City	XEFR-AM	1180 kHz
