= XHCJU-FM =

Radio station in Las Jarretaderas, Nayarit, Mexico (Puerto Vallarta, Jalisco)

- Las Jarretaderas, Nayarit; Mexico
- Broadcast area: Puerto Vallarta, Jalisco
- Frequency: 95.9 MHz
- Branding: Ke Buena

Programming
- Format: Regional Mexican
- Affiliations: Radiópolis

Ownership
- Owner: GlobalMedia; (New Digital NX, S.A. de C.V.)
- Sister stations: XHPVA-FM, XHPTOJ-FM, XHCCBA-FM

History
- First air date: July 11, 1996
- Call sign meaning: "Cruz de Juanacaxtle"

Technical information
- Licensing authority: CRT
- Class: B1
- ERP: 25 kW
- HAAT: −187.6 m (−615 ft)
- Transmitter coordinates: 20°41′58.6″N 105°16′11″W

Links
- Webcast: https://vallartabahia.globalmedia.mx/stations/KeBuenaVallarta
- Website: https://vallartabahia.globalmedia.mx/

XHCJU-FM is a radio station on 95.9 FM in Las Jarretaderas, Nayarit, primarily serving Puerto Vallarta, Jalisco. The station is owned by GlobalMedia and carries the Ke Buena Regional Mexican format brand from Radiópolis.

== History ==
Luis Carlos Mendiola Codina received this station's original concession on April 3, 1995, as XECJU-AM 590, to be located at Cruz de Huanacaxtle, and signing on July 11, 1996. It was authorized to migrate to FM in 2011 as XHCJU-FM on 95.9. The station's tower is located less than a mile from the Nayarit-Jalisco state line.

XHCJU attempted an unauthorized relocation to 96.7 MHz, from a transmitter on the Jalisco side of the state line, in 2013. The frequency change, which was conducted because of interference from XHME-FM and XHVAY-FM, produced interference to air traffic services operating at 119 MHz and prompted federal authorities to open a proceeding that could have revoked the station's concession.

In 2015, XHCJU ditched its own Regional Mexican format in favor of adopting the Ke Buena brand from Televisa Radio. It had previously aired MVS Radio's La Mejor Regional Mexican format.

In 2017, XHCJU-FM was sold to GlobalMedia of the state of San Luis Potosí. The concession transfer to a GlobalMedia subsidiary, New Digital NX, did not take place for nearly two years after the sale.
