= XHPOP-FM =

Radio station in Mexico City

- Mexico City; Mexico
- Frequency: 99.3 MHz
- Branding: Match FM

Programming
- Format: Hot adult contemporary

Ownership
- Owner: Grupo ACIR; (Radio Frecuencia Modulada, S.A. de C.V.)
- Sister stations: XEFR-AM; XHDFM-FM; XHM-FM; XHSH-FM

History
- First air date: 1964
- Former call signs: XEN-FM (1964–1977)
- Call sign meaning: Pop music

Technical information
- Licensing authority: CRT
- Class: C1
- ERP: 90 kW
- HAAT: 115 meters (377 ft)
- Transmitter coordinates: 19°23′11.2″N 99°12′21.1″W

Links
- Webcast: Listen live (via iHeartRadio)
- Website: matchmx.fm

XHPOP-FM is a radio station on 99.3 FM in Mexico City. The station is owned by Grupo ACIR and airs the company's Match hot adult contemporary format.

== History ==
The XHPOP history begins with authorized as XEN-FM, a counterpart to XEN-AM 690 in 1964; the station was simulcasting the AM, known as Radio Mundo. The station was sold in 1977, and the call sign was changed to the current XHPOP-FM the same year. It initially broadcast an instrumental music format under the name Música Feliz 99 before changing to a contemporary hit radio format as Sonido 99 by the end of the decade.

The 1985 Mexico City earthquake severely damaged the studios used by XHPOP and its Ondas de Alegría sister stations, and after some time off the air and a relocation to new studios, the station reemerged as Radio Metrópoli and then Fórmula Mexicana, both broadcasting Mexican music. The station reverted to Sonido 99 at the end of 1987—a year in which the Díaz Romo cluster was split due to family differences—and on November 16, 1988, it changed to Digital 99.

In 1995, it was leased alongside ARTSA sister stations XHPOP, XHM and XHDFM to Grupo ACIR for a period of 10 years, with the goal being to combine the stations to form new national network concepts. In 2005, the station was sold outright to Grupo ACIR.

Previous Digital 99.3 logo (from 2004 to 2010)

=== Radio Disney ===
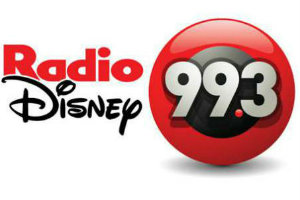
Previous Radio Disney 99.3 logo (from October 9, 2013 to December 25, 2019)

In August 2013, the station stopped using the "Digital" name on-air, only referring to itself as "99-3". This sparked speculation about a format change, with Radio Disney as the main replacement option. This rumors were confirmed, when it was announced that on October 9, XHPOP-FM would become the Mexican version of Radio Disney, which officially launched at noon on that day. Most of the Digital hosts remained on Radio Disney.

=== Match ===
On December 25, 2019, Disney and ACIR announced they were mutually ending their relationship, which had covered twelve Mexican cities. Ten of the twelve Radio Disney stations, including XHPOP, were transitioned to ACIR's replacement format, Match, which formally launched on January 7, 2020. At launch, Match's programming was composed of English-language hits from the 2000s to the present, with no Spanish-language hits and no Latin urban music. In 2025, Spanish-language pop music as well as some Latin urban hits returned to the station's rotation.
