= XEFR-AM =

Radio station in Mexico City

- Mexico City; Mexico
- Broadcast area: Greater Mexico City
- Frequency: 1180 kHz
- Branding: Radio Felicidad

Programming
- Format: Oldies

Ownership
- Owner: Grupo ACIR; (Radio XEFR, S. de R. L. de C. V.)
- Sister stations: XHDFM-FM, XHM-FM, XHPOP-FM, XHSH-FM

History
- First air date: October 6, 1963

Technical information
- Licensing authority: CRT
- Class: B
- Power: 10 kW day; 5 kW night
- Transmitter coordinates: 19°23′11.2″N 99°12′21.1″W

Links
- Webcast: player.listenlive.co/32401/es
- Website: www.radiofelicidad.mx

XEFR-AM is a radio station in Mexico City. Located on 1180 kHz, XEFR-AM is owned by Grupo ACIR and broadcasts an oldies format known as Radio Felicidad.

== History ==
Radio Felicidad received its concession in 1952 and came to air in 1963.

In 1994, the station became Radio Capital and in 1997 the station flipped to rock-formatted as Óxido 1180. That format was discontinued in early 1998 in favor of sports talk as Super Deportiva 1180; it lasted until 2001, before Grupo ACIR decided to flip the station to its regional Mexican La Comadre format (which returned to Mexico City from 2015 to 2021 and since 2022 on XEL-AM 1260). This, too, did not last long, before the Radio Felicidad name and format, which had been associated with the station in its early days, was restored in 2003.
