= XHECD-FM =

Radio station in Puebla, Puebla, Mexico

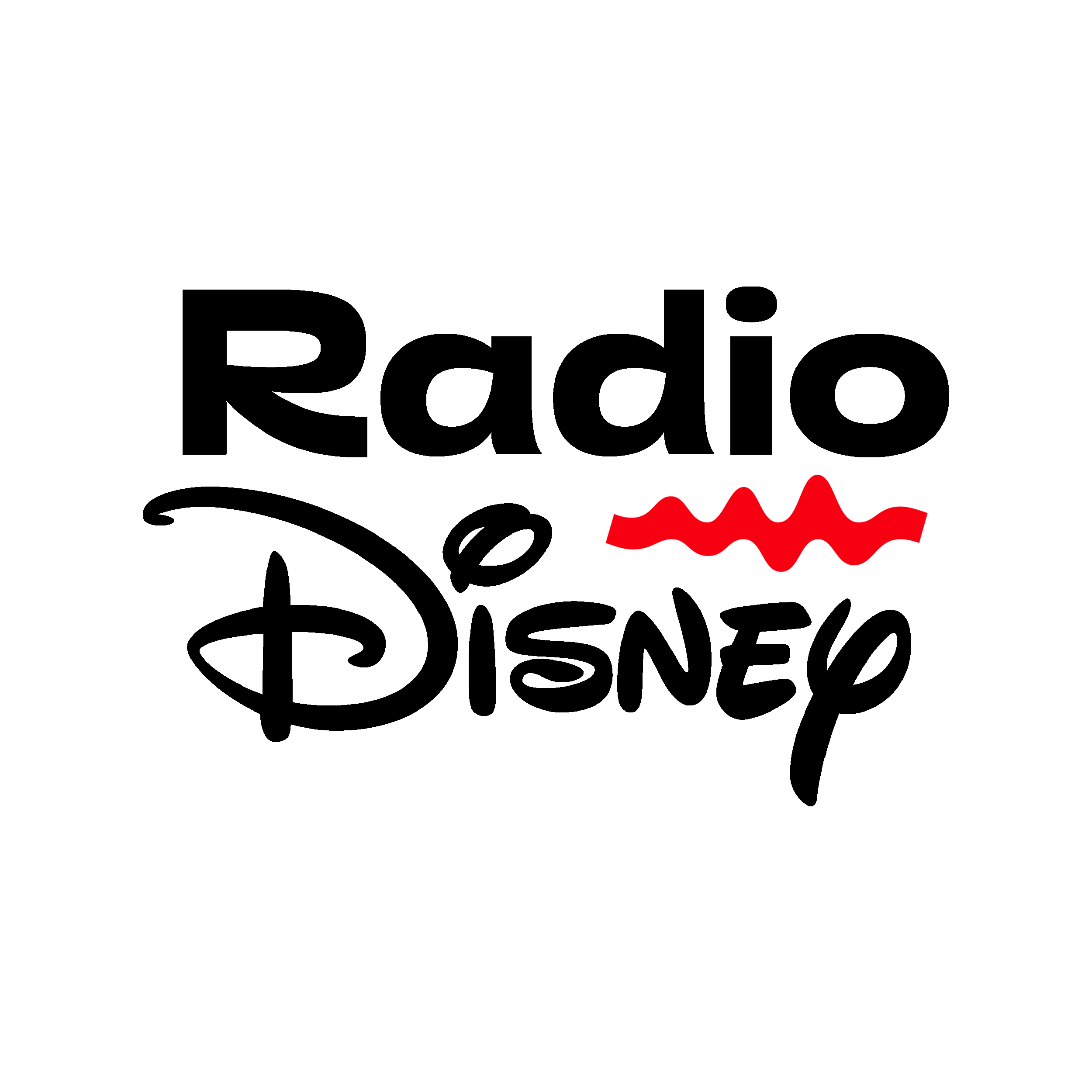

Puebla, Puebla, Mexico; Mexico
- Frequency: 92.9 MHz (HD Radio)
- Branding: Radio Disney

Programming
- Format: Contemporary hit radio
- Subchannels: HD2: "La Romántica"
- Affiliations: Grupo Siete

Ownership
- Owner: Grupo Oro; (Radio Puebla, S.A.)
- Sister stations: XHORO-FM

History
- First air date: May 5, 1940
- Former call signs: XECD-AM
- Former frequencies: 1340 kHz (1940–1941), 1170 kHz (1941–2020)

Technical information
- Class: A
- ERP: 1,000 watts
- HAAT: 38.5 m
- Transmitter coordinates: 19°03′20.4″N 98°13′30.9″W

Links
- Webcast: Listen live Listen live (HD2)
- Website: radiodisney.disneylatino.com/mexico laromantica.com.mx (HD2)

XHECD-FM is a radio station on 92.9 FM in Puebla, Puebla, Mexico. It is owned by Grupo Oro and affiliated with Grupo Siete, as Radio Disney with a pop format. XHECD-FM is broadcast from a facility in the Colonia La Paz neighborhood of Puebla, a hilltop site also used for TV Azteca and XHP-TDT service.

XHECD-FM broadcasts in HD and carries two subchannels, known as Radio Disney 92.9.1 and La Romántica 92.9.2.

== History ==
XECD was the second radio station in Puebla. It came to air on May 5, 1940, broadcasting for the first six months on 1340 kHz. Ricardo Vázquez held the concession for the 350-watt station; in 1946, it was bought by Roberto Cañedo, and five years later, Oscar Frese Márquez became the concessionaire.

In 1954, Joaquín Grajales Corral acquired XECD, building the station up during a time when radio expanded in Mexico; Radio Puebla, S.A. was created as the concessionaire in 1969. XECD ultimately became the flagship station of Grupo Oro, which is still owned by the Grajales family. It would broadcast with 10,000 watts day and 2,500 watts night.

From 2004 to 2007, the station was affiliated with Radio Fórmula and was known as "Fórmula 1170". Radio Fórmula then moved to Cinco Radio-owned XEPOP-AM 1120.

In August 2015, it changed its name to Ciudad W, making clear its connection with the W Radio chain; the programming did not undergo substantial modifications.

XECD moved to 92.9 MHz FM in early 2018. At that time, it adopted a romantic music format known as La Romántica. The AM station was turned off on August 7, 2020.

XHECD-FM as La Romántica

On August 2, 2021, La Romántica became an online-only station (the format also continued on Oro-operated XHEV-FM based in Atlixco until the end of July 2022), and XHECD-FM flipped to Radio Disney. Radio Disney had previously been broadcast on the 90.1 frequency when Grupo ACIR held the national franchise. Programming began on August 16.
