= XEVOZ-AM =

Radio station in Mexico City

Simulcast of XEUR-AM 1530
- Mexico City; Mexico
- Broadcast area: Greater Mexico City
- Frequency: 1590 AM
- Branding: Buenisiima

Programming
- Format: Tropical music

Ownership
- Owner: Grupo Audiorama Comunicaciones; (Radio Publicidad Latinoamericana, S.A. de C.V.)
- Sister stations: XEWF-AM, XECO-AM, XEUR-AM

History
- First air date: 1944
- Former call signs: XEMC-AM
- Call sign meaning: Station was known as "Radio Voz"

Technical information
- Licensing authority: CRT
- Class: B
- Power: 20 kW day 0.900 kW night
- Transmitter coordinates: 19°40′33.76″N 99°06′31.51″W
- Repeater: XEUR-AM 1530 kHz (Mexico City)

Links
- Webcast: Listen live
- Website: audiorama.mx

XEVOZ-AM is a radio station in Mexico City on 1590 AM with a transmitter 32 kilometres (20 mi) away at San Pablo de las Salinas, in Tultitlan Municipality, State of Mexico.

== History ==
XEVOZ logo from 2010-16 as "La Mexicana"

The first concession for 1590 AM was made in 1944 for XEMC-AM, made to Dolores G. Estrada de Ferreiro. During its early years, it broadcast Spanish music.

In 1963, Grupo ACIR bought the station and changed its calls to XEVOZ-AM. Under ACIR it became "Radio Voz" and broadcast tropical music. The format remained until 1989, when the station became "Radio ACIR", a format moved to XEL-AM not long after. XEVOZ in turn received the name "Capital Radio" and a rock format; the station was soon renamed "Capital Heavy Radio". The next 15 years would be marked by a carousel of formats: "Radio Capital" with tropical and norteña music (1995–1996); the short-lived "Óxido" rock format that was moved to XEFR-AM months later; ranchera music as "Bonita 1590" (1996–July 2004): "Radio Reloj", news with time announcements every minute (July 2004–August 2006, during the brief window that XEQK-AM was not on its similar format); "Radio Tráfico", traffic conditions for Mexico City (August 2006–January 2008); and "Luz 1590" with Christian pop (January 2008–December 6, 2009), being the first station in Mexico City with that format).

On December 7, 2009, ACIR shed many of its stations, with Radiorama buying all of them. Under Radiorama XEVOZ had five different formats and names between late 2009 and 2010: "Radio 1590" with Spanish rock (December 7, 2009–January 29, 2010); "Radio Fiesta", a name used formerly on XEUR-AM (January 29–May); "Vida 1590" with contemporary music in Spanish and English; and finally, regional Mexican as "Radio Mexicana 1590" from June 1, 2010, changed to "La Mexicana 1590" in October.

XEVOZ logo from 2016-21 as "Arroba 1590"

In June 2016, XEVOZ flipped from Regional Mexican to CHR/Top 40 as "Arroba 1590". On November 12, 2021, XEVOZ switched back to the tropical music format as Buenisiima, a brand belonging to Grupo Audiorama Comunicaciones.
