= XHEPA-FM =

Radio station in Puebla, Puebla, Mexico

XHEPA-FM / XEPA-AM
- Puebla, Puebla; Mexico
- Frequencies: 89.7 MHz (HD Radio); 1010 kHz
- Branding: La Ke Buena

Programming
- Format: Regional Mexican
- Affiliations: Radiópolis

Ownership
- Owner: Grupo Hanan Comunicación (José Asef Hanan Badri)

History
- First air date: October 25, 1958
- Call sign meaning: PueblA

Technical information
- Class: (AM) B (FM) A
- Power: (AM) 20,000 watts day 2,000 watts night
- ERP: (FM) 2,996 watts
- HAAT: (FM) 57.1 m
- Transmitter coordinates: 19°06′11.58″N 98°17′42.12″W

Links
- Webcast: Listen live
- Website: kebuenapuebla.com

XHEPA-FM/XEPA-AM is a radio station on 89.7 FM and 1010 AM in Puebla, Puebla. The station is owned by Grupo Hanan Comunicación and carries the La Ke Buena Regional Mexican format from Radiópolis. 1010 AM is a Canadian clear-channel frequency.

== History ==
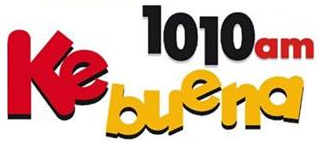
Logo as Ke Buena, used until 2018

XEPA-AM received its concession on October 9, 1958. Salvador Martínez Aguirre owned the station, which signed on 16 days later on 1370 kHz with 5,000 watts of power during the day and 250 at night. Martínez Aguirre had entered into a partnership with Veracruz radio giant Carlos Ferráez Matos, and the station's inauguration was headlined by Governor Fausto M. Ortega. Given the difficulty of sending audio by phone line to the transmitter at San José Xilotzingo, XEPA was authorized to use an FM studio-transmitter link at 88.2 MHz. In 1960, Ferráez's participation in the station ended. The station's early years as "Radio Angelópolis", a station with a full-service format, included key moments, such as being a coordinating station for the 1964 presidential campaign of Gustavo Díaz Ordaz and leading efforts to aid earthquake victims in 1972. In 1974, XEPA became known as "Su Favorita" and began distinctly targeting a rural audience. Most of its listeners were from outside the Puebla metropolitan area. The next year, the station flipped to Latin pop as "Sonido 13-70", but upon consolidating with Radio Oro in 1976, in order to not compete with its FM-formatted pop stations, XEPA took on a Regional Mexican format and became known as "La Poblanita", which rated well in the market.

After Martínez Aguirre died, Margarita Duarte Calderón, Salvador Joaquín Martínez Duarte, Georgina Martínez de Cabrera, Alicia Martínez de Ortega and Raúl Antonio Martínez Gardiazabal became the concessionaires in 1977. That year, their studios moved in with XHORO-FM "Radio Oro", but in 1983, they moved out after striking a partnership with XHPBA-FM "Sí FM" for studio space. In 1987, XEPA flipped to tropical salsa and merengue music as "La Grande"; La Grande and its successor format, "La Súper Fiera" with Regional Mexican music, held XEPA in the top 10 of the local radio ratings.

In the 1990s, XEPA was moved to 1010 kHz and built a new transmitter site in Santa María Coronango, capable of delivering 10,000 watts and stereo sound. By 1998, XEPA had changed again, to La Prendida, with a similar format. In 2000, XEPA went to Ke Buena for the first time.

Power was doubled in 2005, a year after the station relaunched as "La Diez" (The 10) with a hybrid of locally targeted news and talk programs, as well as music on the weekends. The concessionaires who had inherited XEPA in the 1970s were now dying. In 2008, José Asef Hanan Badri acquired the ownership stakes of the three remaining living concessionaires, while Arely del Rocío Martínez Rojas inherited Martínez Duarte's share and later sold to Hanan Badri in 2012.

XEPA would later return to the Ke Buena format. The station began its AM-FM migration in early 2018 as XHEPA-FM 89.7.
