= XHHIT-FM =

XHHIT-FM may refer to:

- XHHIT-FM (Baja California), a radio station in Tecate, Baja California, Mexico
- XHHIT-FM (Puebla), a radio station in San Bernardino Tlaxcalancingo, Puebla, Mexico
