= XHMZT-FM =

Radio station in Mazatlán, Sinaloa, Mexico

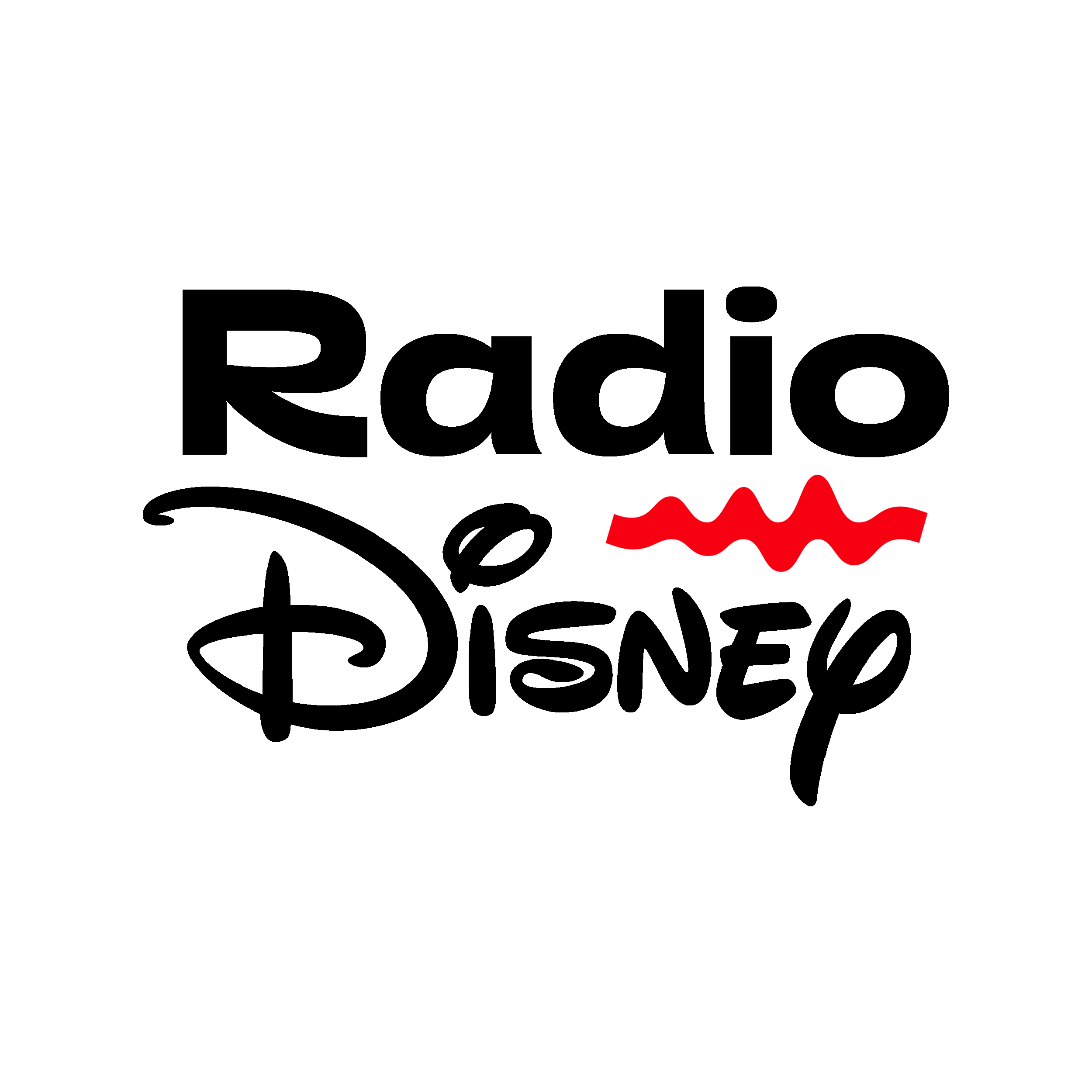
- Mazatlán, Sinaloa; Mexico
- Frequency: 93.1 MHz
- Branding: Radio Disney

Programming
- Format: Contemporary hit radio

Ownership
- Owner: Grupo Siete; (Grupo Radial Siete, S.A. de C.V.)

History
- First air date: October 10, 1991 (concession)
- Call sign meaning: Mazatlán

Technical information
- Licensing authority: CRT
- Class: B
- ERP: 50 kW
- HAAT: 93.6 m (307 ft)

Links
- Webcast: Listen live
- Website: radiodisney.disneylatino.com/mexico www.gruposiete.com.mx

XHMZT-FM is a radio station on 93.1 MHz in Mazatlán, Sinaloa, Mexico. The station is owned by Grupo Siete and carries the Radio Disney pop format.

== History ==
XHMZT received its concession on October 10, 1991. It has had the same owner for its entire history and has spent most of its time on air carrying Grupo Siete's grupera format (initially called La Jefa and later La Única).

Previous logo

On July 1, 2017, XHMZT flipped from Bengala to an English-language classic hits format known as Studio 93.1. The format came to an end on January 1, 2023, in preparation for the relaunch of Radio Disney into the market. Radio Disney had previously been heard on XHMAT-FM from 2014 to 2019 when Grupo ACIR held the franchise in Mexico, which was launched on February 6, 2023.
