= XHOCA-FM =

Radio station in Oaxaca, Oaxaca, Mexico

- Oaxaca de Juárez, Oaxaca; Mexico
- Frequency: 89.7 MHz
- Branding: La Ke Buena

Programming
- Format: Grupera
- Affiliations: Radiopolis

Ownership
- Owner: Grupo Radio Cañón; (Radio Cañón, S.A. de C.V.)
- Sister stations: XHKC-FM

History
- First air date: October 23, 1992 (concession)
- Call sign meaning: Oaxaca

Technical information
- ERP: 50 kW

Links
- Webcast: Listen live
- Website: grupo-rc.mx

XHOCA-FM is a radio station on 89.7 FM in Oaxaca de Juárez, Oaxaca, Mexico. It carries the Ke Buena national regional Mexican format from Radiópolis.

== History ==
Final logo as La Comadre, used until 2017

XHOCA received its concession in October 1992; the concession was originally awarded to José Antonio Ibarra Fariña, part of the Ibarra family that founded Grupo ACIR.

In 2017, XHOCA picked up the Amor format previously on XHIU-FM 105.7, ditching the grupera La Comadre format. Amor ran on XHOCA until October 31, 2023. On December 1, 2023, XHOCA adopted the Los 40 pop brand (previously on XHYN-FM 102.9) under new operators.

In December 2025, XHOCA adapted the grupera music under the Ke Buena brand.
