= XHEZAR-FM =

Radio station in Puebla, Puebla

- San Bernardino Tlaxcalancingo-Puebla, Puebla; Mexico
- Frequency: 96.1 MHz (HD Radio)
- Branding: La 96 FM

Programming
- Format: Adult Contemporary

Ownership
- Owner: Grupo Radiorama; (Radio XEZAR, S.A. de C.V.)
- Operator: Cadena In
- Sister stations: XHRTP-FM

History
- First air date: August 25, 1989 (concession); September 13, 2018 (FM)
- Former frequencies: 920 kHz (1989–2020)

Technical information
- Class: A
- ERP: 700 watts
- Transmitter coordinates: 19°03′39.4″N 98°13′47.6″W

Links
- Webcast: Listen live
- Website: cadenain.com

XHEZAR-FM is a radio station on 96.1 FM in Puebla, Puebla, Puebla, Mexico. It broadcasts on 96.1 FM, XHEZAR-FM is owned by Grupo Radiorama and operated by Cadena In and is known as La 96 FM with an Adult Contemporary format.

== History ==
Logo used as @FM (Arroba FM) until April 2025

XEZAR-AM 920 received its concession on January 6, 1989. It began broadcasting later that year as part of Corporación Puebla de Radiodifusión, a subsidiary company of Grupo ACIR; the concession was held by Alberto Guilbot Serros until ACIR purchased it outright in 1998. The original format was ranchera as Q Bonita. At the beginning of the 2000s, it changed its format to Spanish adult contemporary as Inolvidable; in 2004, it returned to ranchera as "Bonita". Three years later, it became 920 Noticias, a repeater of the Mexico City stations 88.9 Noticias and La 1260.

In 2009, Grupo ACIR sold a group of its stations, located throughout Mexico, to Radiorama, including XEZAR-AM. This was Radiorama's first station in the Puebla market, and the company opted to lease it out to Grupo Oro. It changed to grupera music as La Z before becoming W Radio Puebla in 2012.

In 2014, control of XEZAR-AM was taken over by Radiorama. Under Radiorama operation, its formats have been Encuentro 920, airing a pop format, and Éxtasis Digital, English-language classic hits. In 2017, it joined the Arroba FM pop network.

XEZAR migrated to FM on September 13, 2018, as XHEZAR-FM 96.1. A new tower was installed at the Radiorama studios. The AM station concluded broadcasting in 2020.

In April 2025, Grupo Radiorama leased XHEZAR and its sister station XHRTP-FM in San Martín Texmelucan to Intolerancia Diario. On May 7, the "La 96 FM" format was launched.
