= XHMO-FM =

Radio station in Morelia, Michoacán

- Morelia, Michoacán; Mexico
- Frequency: 93.9 FM
- Branding: Match FM

Programming
- Format: Hot adult contemporary

Ownership
- Owner: Grupo ACIR; (Radio XHMO, S. de R.L. de C.V.)

History
- First air date: August 29, 1970 (concession)
- Call sign meaning: Morelia

Technical information
- ERP: 28.96 kW

Links
- Website: matchmx.fm

XHMO-FM is a radio station on 93.9 FM in Morelia, Michoacán, Mexico. It is owned by Grupo ACIR and carries its Match hot adult contemporary format.

== History ==
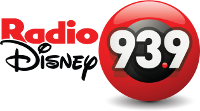
Logo as Radio Disney from September 1, 2014 until December 25, 2019

XHMO received its concession on August 29, 1970. It was owned by Radio FM de Morelia, S.A. and has been operated by ACIR for most of its history.

It carried the Radio Amistad format through the 1980s. It later adopted Grupo ACIR's Digital pop format, which was later transitioned to Radio Disney.

=== Match ===
On December 26, 2019, Disney and ACIR announced they were mutually ending their relationship, which had covered twelve Mexican cities. Ten of the twelve Radio Disney stations, including XHMO, were transitioned to ACIR's replacement pop format, Match.
