= XHOK-FM =

Radio station in Guadalupe-Monterrey, Nuevo León, Mexico

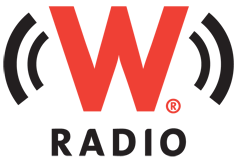
- Guadalupe-Monterrey, Nuevo León; Mexico
- Frequency: 90.9 FM
- Branding: W Radio

Programming
- Format: News/talk
- Affiliations: Radiópolis

Ownership
- Owner: Grupo ACIR (pending sale to Grupo Radio Cañón); (Radio XEOK, S. de R.L. de C.V.)
- Operator: Grupo Radio Cañón

History
- First air date: June 19, 1948 (concession); May 2018 (FM)
- Former call signs: XEOK-AM
- Former frequencies: 950 kHz (1948–1950); 920 kHz (1950–1990); 900 kHz (1990–2019)
- Call sign meaning: In Spanish, "O-K" sounds like Oca, as in original concessionaire Carlos Roa Montes de Oca

Technical information
- Licensing authority: CRT
- Class: A
- ERP: 2 kW
- HAAT: −11.2 meters (−37 ft)
- Transmitter coordinates: 25°41′18.0″N 100°14′59.1″W

Links
- Webcast: Listen live
- Website: grupo-rc.mx

XHOK-FM is a radio station on 90.9 FM in Monterrey, Nuevo León, Mexico. It is owned by Grupo ACIR.

XHOK-FM is authorized to broadcast in HD Radio, but the station does not use this feature.

== History ==
XEOK-AM received its concession on June 19, 1948. It broadcast initially on 950 kHz (soon moving to 920) and was owned by Carlos Roa Montes de Oca, who also built a studio-transmitter link for XEOK in the FM band in the late 1950s. XEOK was sold to Radiodifusión Regiomontana, S.A. in 1963, which boosted its power to 1 kW by the 1980s. In the 1990s, XEOK moved from 920 to 900 kHz which allowed a further power increase to 10,000 watts. ACIR concessionaires have owned XEOK since 2000.

For most of the late 2000s and 2010s, XEOK was a news/talk outlet known as "La OK". With ACIR only owning one station in Monterrey, XEOK was selected for second-wave AM-FM migration and signed on XHOK-FM 90.9 in May 2018. In June, the station took on the Radio Disney format, much like its Guadalajara sister station, XHEMIA-FM.

ACIR and Radio Disney parted ways on December 25, 2019. Most of the Radio Disney stations were to change to a similar pop format from ACIR known as Match FM, but ACIR opted to flip XHOK to romantic and place XHOK in its Amor network.

Amor ran on XHOK until April 21, 2026, when Grupo ACIR dropped its formats from the cluster it ran in the market.
