= XHPCA-FM =

Radio station in Pachuca, Hidalgo, Mexico

- Pachuca, Hidalgo; Mexico
- Frequency: 106.1 MHz
- Branding: Radio Crystal

Programming
- Format: Regional Mexican

Ownership
- Owner: Grupo Siete Comunicación; (Grupo Radial Siete, S.A. de C.V.)
- Sister stations: XHMY-FM

History
- First air date: October 25, 1991 (concession)
- Call sign meaning: Pachuca

Technical information
- Class: AA
- ERP: 5,000 watts

Links
- Webcast: Listen live
- Website: radiocrystal.mx

XHPCA-FM is a radio station on 106.1 FM in Pachuca, Hidalgo. It is owned by Grupo Siete Comunicación and carries a Regional Mexican format known as Radio Crystal.

== History ==
XHPCA received its concession on October 25, 1991. It was owned by Carlos Rafael González Aragón Ortiz and, like his other stations, sold to Grupo Siete Comunicación. It originally broadcast that company's Crystal format, switching to Exa FM in 2004 when Grupo Siete entered into a deal with MVS Radio. That deal ended in January 2008, and the station was relaunched as "Neurótica FM" in February 2008, a name already used by the company at its XHTOM-FM in Toluca, State of Mexico.

The station returned to a pop franchise format on February 27, 2009 when the station switched to Los 40 Principales. This ended on January 1, 2013, with the use of different names for the same pop format, including +Radio (Más Radio) until April 2015 and Neurótik until May 2021.

On May 31, 2021, XHPCA became Grupo Siete's third Radio Disney station after XHFO-FM revived the format in 2020 and XHTOM-FM in Toluca, the other former Neurótik station, converted to Radio Disney earlier in the year.

XHPCA and XHMY-FM on 95.7 exchanged formats on August 29, 2022, with the Crystal Regional Mexican brand returning to XHPCA.
