= XHCNA-FM =

Radio station in Culiacán, Sinaloa

- Culiacán, Sinaloa; Mexico
- Frequency: 100.1 FM
- Branding: Match FM

Programming
- Format: Hot adult contemporary

Ownership
- Owner: Grupo ACIR; (Radio XHCNA Culiacán, S. de R.L. de C.V.)
- Sister stations: XHCLI-FM

History
- First air date: October 1, 1980 (concession)
- Call sign meaning: CuliacáN SinaloA

Technical information
- Licensing authority: CRT
- Class: B
- ERP: 26 kW
- HAAT: 44.4 m (146 ft)
- Transmitter coordinates: 24°49′56″N 107°24′17″W

Links
- Webcast: Listen live
- Website: matchmx.fm

XHCNA-FM is a radio station on 100.1 FM in Culiacán, Sinaloa. It is owned by Grupo ACIR and carries its Match FM hot adult contemporary format.

== History ==
XHCNA received its concession on October 1, 1980. It was owned by Leonardo Julián López Saínz Puga. ACIR owned the station by the 1990s.

Radio Disney Culiacán went on air September 29, 2014, remaining in the pop format but replacing ACIR's own Digital brand.

On December 26, 2019, Disney and ACIR announced they were mutually ending their relationship, which had covered twelve Mexican cities. Ten of the twelve Radio Disney stations, including XHCNA, were transitioned to ACIR's replacement pop format, Match.
