= XHRS-FM =

Radio station in Puebla, Puebla, Mexico

- Puebla, Puebla; Mexico
- Frequency: 90.1 FM
- Branding: Match

Programming
- Format: Hot adult contemporary

Ownership
- Owner: Grupo ACIR; (Organización Radio Oro, S.A. de C.V.)
- Sister stations: XHRH-FM, XHRC-FM, XHHIT-FM

History
- First air date: December 2, 1977 (concession)
- Call sign meaning: Ricardo Salas Ramón

Technical information
- Class: B1
- ERP: 19.74 kW
- Transmitter coordinates: 19°02′36.3″N 98°12′43.14″W

Links
- Webcast: Listen live
- Website: matchfm.mx

XHRS-FM is a radio station on 90.1 FM in Puebla, Puebla, Mexico. The station is operated by Grupo ACIR and carries its Match hot adult contemporary format.

== History ==
XHRS received its first concession on December 2, 1977. It was owned by Ricardo Salas Ramón until 1986, when Radio Oro bought the station.

It carried a pop format known as Digital 90.1 until November 18, 2014, when it flipped to the Radio Disney brand.

=== Match ===
On December 8, a newspaper report was published stating that XHRS was about to leave Radio Disney, and that XHECD-FM 92.9 was interested in acquiring the brand rights for Puebla. On December 26, Disney and ACIR announced they were mutually ending their relationship, which had covered twelve Mexican cities. Ten of the twelve Radio Disney stations, including XHRS, were transitioned to ACIR's replacement pop format, Match.
