= XHPVA-FM =

Radio station in Puerto Vallarta, Jalisco

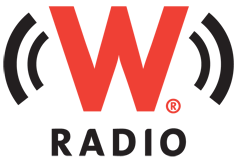
- Puerto Vallarta, Jalisco; Mexico
- Frequency: 90.3 FM
- Branding: W Radio

Programming
- Format: News/talk
- Affiliations: Radiópolis

Ownership
- Owner: Velarde family; (Favela Radio, S.A. de C.V.)
- Operator: GlobalMedia
- Sister stations: XHCJU-FM, XHPTOJ-FM, XHCCBA-FM

History
- First air date: March 20, 1992 (concession)
- Call sign meaning: Puerto Vallarta

Technical information
- Licensing authority: CRT
- Class: B1
- ERP: 15.24 kW
- HAAT: −186.6 m (−612 ft)

Links
- Webcast: Listen live
- Website: globalmedia.mx

XHPVA-FM is a radio station on 90.3 FM in Puerto Vallarta, Jalisco, Mexico.

== History ==
XHPVA received its concession on March 20, 1992. It was owned by Julio Velarde y Achucarro, whose family continues to own the station today.

On November 8, 2021, XHPVA ended its affiliation with Grupo ACIR, which programmed the station with its Amor romantic format. GlobalMedia then began operating the station with the W Radio news/talk brand from Radiópolis.
