= XHEMIA-FM =

Radio station in San Pedro Tlaquepaque, Jalisco, Mexico

- Tlaquepaque-Guadalajara, Jalisco; Mexico
- Frequency: 90.3 MHz (HD Radio)
- Branding: Match FM

Programming
- Format: Hot adult contemporary

Ownership
- Owner: Grupo ACIR; (Radio XEMIA, S. de R.L. de C.V.)
- Sister stations: XHPI-FM

History
- First air date: July 16, 1963 (concession); April, 2018 (FM)
- Former call signs: XEMIA-AM
- Former frequencies: 860 kHz, 850 kHz (1960s–2019)

Technical information
- Licensing authority: CRT
- Class: A
- ERP: 3 kW
- HAAT: 38.7 meters (127 ft)
- Transmitter coordinates: 20°39′40.93″N 103°23′10.64″W

Links
- Webcast: matchmx.fm

XHEMIA-FM is a radio station on 90.3 FM in San Pedro Tlaquepaque, Jalisco, in the Guadalajara metropolitan area. It is owned by Grupo ACIR.

== History ==
XHEMIA received its concession as a Chapala-based station, XEWI. It received its concession in 1963 but was on the air by 1959. XEWI was owned by Luis Garcia Talavera and broadcast as a daytimer with 1,000 watts on 860 kHz. Several years later, it was sold to Radio Promotora de Jalisco, and beginning in the late 1960s, it was a Grupo ACIR station in Guadalajara and broadcasting on 850, known as XEMIA-AM "Radio Felicidad".

XEMIA became "La Consentida" in 1989, it soon became a general "Radio ACIR". After carrying ACIR's Bonita ranchera format from 2003 to 2006, it eventually adopted a format primarily of news/talk programs known as "850 Noticias", it would rebranded as "Mundo Ofertas 850" in 2010, and then simply "850 AM" in 2012.

XEMIA was selected to migrate to FM in 2017 and began transmitting on XHEMIA-FM 90.3 in April 2018. After a transition period, XHEMIA began broadcasting the Radio Disney pop format on the 29th of that month.

On December 26, 2019, Disney and ACIR announced they were mutually ending their relationship, which had covered twelve Mexican cities. Ten of the twelve Radio Disney stations, including XHEMIA, were transitioned to ACIR's replacement pop format, Match.
