= Radio Disney (Argentina) =

Radio Disney radio station in Buenos Aires

LRL301
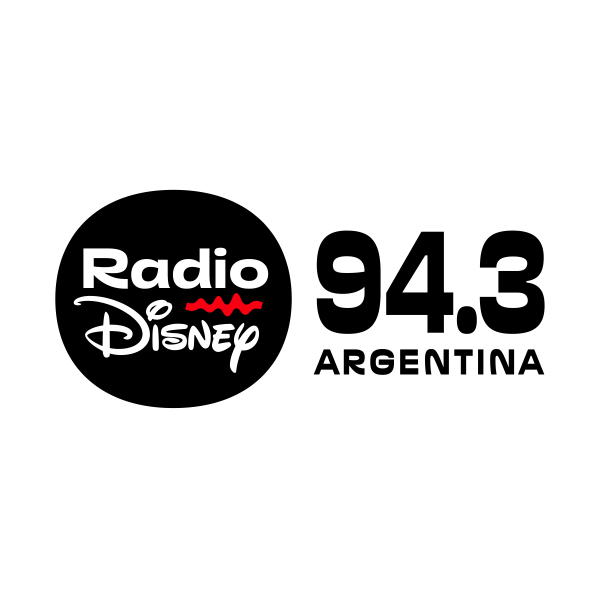

Buenos Aires; Argentina
- Broadcast area: Greater Buenos Aires
- Frequency: 94.3 MHz
- Branding: Radio Disney 94.3

Programming
- Language: Spanish
- Format: Contemporary hit radio
- Network: Radio Disney

Ownership
- Owner: Radio Medios S.A. (95%); Disney Argentina (4.75%); ABC Venture (0,25%); (Difusora Baires S.A.)

History
- First air date: September 1, 1983 (as Radio el Mundo FM)

Technical information
- Licensing authority: ENACOM
- ERP: 250,000 watts
- HAAT: 136 meters
- Transmitter coordinates: 34°36′43″S 58°22′51″W

Links
- Website: ar.radiodisney.com

LRL301 (94.3 FM, also called Radio Disney Argentina) is a radio station broadcasting current music. Licensed to Buenos Aires, Argentina, the station serves the Greater Buenos Aires area. The station is currently owned by Difusora Baires S.A. (Radio Medios S.A., The Walt Disney Company Argentina and ABC Venture Corp.), and features programming from Radio Disney, a radio network whose flagship station is LRL301 itself.

LRL301 was the first Radio Disney-branded station in Latin America.

== History ==
LRL301 was founded on September 1, 1983, under the name Radio el Mundo FM.

On August 14, 1986, the station changed its branding to "FM Horizonte".

In 2001, the station was sold to Disney and was rebranded as Radio Disney, beginning its regional expansion to other Latin American countries.

== Availability ==
Radio Disney Argentina is only available in Buenos Aires on terrestrial radio, although it is also available on TV providers nationwide such as Cablevisión and DirecTV.

== Rankings ==
- Ranking Anual (Year-end chart)
- Ranking Latinoamérica (Latin America top)
- Ranking Argentina (Argentina Top 47)

== Ranking Argentina ==
"Ranking Argentina" is a special chart published every Friday by the radio, that contains the 47 most voted songs.
