= XHPI-FM =

Radio station in Guadalajara, Jalisco

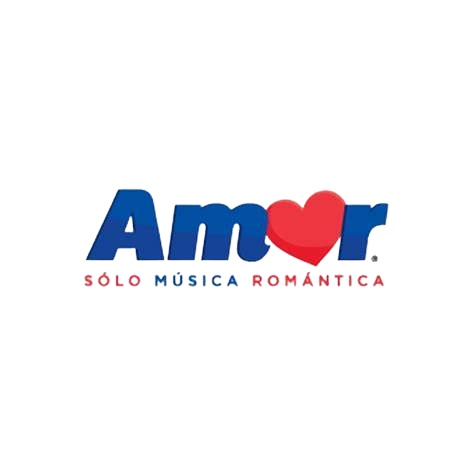
- Guadalajara, Jalisco; Mexico
- Frequency: 93.1 MHz
- Branding: Amor

Programming
- Format: Romantic

Ownership
- Owner: Grupo ACIR; (Radio Integral, S. de R.L. de C.V.)
- Sister stations: XHEMIA-FM

History
- First air date: November 10, 1982 (concession)

Technical information
- Licensing authority: CRT
- Class: C1
- ERP: 79.8 kW
- HAAT: 38.7 meters (127 ft)
- Transmitter coordinates: 20°39′40.93″N 103°23′10.64″W

Links
- Webcast: XHPI-FM
- Website: amorfm.mx/amor-93-1-guadalajara/

XHPI-FM is a radio station on 93.1 FM in Guadalajara. The station is owned by Grupo ACIR and carries its Amor romantic music format.

== History ==
XHPI received its first concession on November 10, 1982. The original concessionaire was Grupo ACIR founder, Francisco Ibarra López.
