= XEWF-AM =

Radio station in Tlalmanalco, State of Mexico

- Tlalmanalco, State of Mexico; Mexico
- Broadcast area: Greater Mexico City
- Frequency: 540 kHz
- Branding: La Bestia Grupera

Programming
- Format: Grupera

Ownership
- Owner: Grupo Audiorama Comunicaciones; (XEWF, S.A.)
- Sister stations: XEVOZ-AM, XEUR-AM, XECO-AM

History
- First air date: 1962; 64 years ago
- Former frequencies: 1420 kHz (1962–2004)

Technical information
- Licensing authority: CRT
- Class: B
- Power: 20,000 watts (day); 2,500 watts (night)
- Transmitter coordinates: 19°10′13.5″N 98°50′49.1″W

Links
- Webcast: Listen live
- Website: audiorama.mx

XEWF-AM (540 AM) is a commercial radio station in Tlalmanalco, in the State of Mexico. It is owned by Grupo Audiorama Comunicaciones and it serves the Greater Mexico City. XEWF-AM carries a regional Mexican radio format and is known as "La Bestia Grupera."

By day, it is powered at 20,000 watts. But to protect other stations on 540 AM from interference, it reduces power at night to 2,500 watts. It uses a non-directional antenna.

== History ==
The history of XEWF begins in Cuernavaca, Morelos. Fernando Díaz Enríquez received a concession for a station on 1420 kHz in that city. After four decades of transmitting from Cuernavaca, XEWF moved in September 2004 to Tlalmanalco, east of Mexico City. That was coupled with a change in its frequency to 540 kHz in a bid to become a rimshot station serving Mexico City, which comprises 35% of the national radio market.

On October 18, 2006, Radiorama Valle de México began operating 540 AM as a children's radio station, "ColoRín ColoRadio," targeted at youngsters from ages six to twelve. On May 15, 2007, XEUR-AM 1530 and XEWF 540 completed a format swap, with XEUR becoming a simulcast of grupera-formatted XEQ-FM 92.9 Ke Buena. The next year, the station broke from XEQ-FM to run its own programming aimed at listeners on the east side of Mexico City, since its transmitter is also east of the capital. The station has since changed names twice, to "La Mexiquense" and "La Bestia Grupera".

On January 1, 2020, the station began simulcasting the news-talk format on 98.5 XHDL-FM "El Heraldo Radio". A year later on February 1, 2021, XEWF returned to "La Bestia Grupera" format, leaving "El Heraldo Radio" only on XHDL-FM.
