= XHPCZA-FM =

Radio station in Zacatlán, Puebla

- Zacatlán, Puebla; Mexico
- Frequency: 88.3 FM
- Branding: Única FM

Programming
- Format: Contemporary hit radio

Ownership
- Owner: Daniel Carlos Cázares Álvarez

History
- First air date: April 2019
- Call sign meaning: Chignahuapan, Zacatlán, Ahuazotepec

Technical information
- Class: A
- ERP: 3 kW
- HAAT: 133.4 m
- Transmitter coordinates: 19°55′04.19″N 97°55′55.13″W

XHPCZA-FM is a radio station on 88.3 FM in Zacatlán, Puebla, Mexico, serving Zacatlán and Chignahuapan. The station is owned by Daniel Carlos Cázares Álvarez and known as Única FM with a pop format.

== History ==
XHPCZA was awarded in the IFT-4 radio auction of 2017 to Óscar Mario Beteta Vallejo for 796,000 pesos, but the station went through three different winning bidders who refused to pay for the station. Detochomorocho Producciones was the original winning bidder but refused to pay the price of 11 million pesos. Two further bidders, Corporación Sonitel and Sak Telecom, did not pay up. The award of XHPCZA's concession to Beteta Vallejo marked the end of the IFT-4 auction.

XHPCZA signed on in 2019 as the first commercial radio station in Zacatlán. It was sold by Beteta to Daniel Carlos Cázares Álvarez in 2021.

On May 1, 2022, the station flipped from pop as Única FM 88.3 to grupera using the La Magnífica brand owned by Tribuna Comunicación. XHPCZA joined XELFFS-AM 980 in Izúcar de Matamoros as a franchised La Magnífica station. The format change and operator change were undone in November 2024.
