= XHEMM-FM =

Radio station in Morelia, Michoacán

- Morelia, Michoacán; Mexico
- Frequency: 101.7 FM
- Branding: Mix

Programming
- Format: Adult hits

Ownership
- Owner: Grupo ACIR; (Radio XHEMM, S. de R.L. de C.V.)

History
- First air date: March 4, 1955 (concession)
- Call sign meaning: Morelia, Michoacán

Technical information
- Class: B1
- ERP: 25 kW
- Transmitter coordinates: 19°41′25.62″N 101°10′51.78″W

Links
- Website: www.iheart.com/live/mix-1017-8079/

XHEMM-FM is a radio station on 101.7 FM in Morelia, Michoacán. It is owned by Grupo ACIR and carries its Mix adult hits format.

== History ==
XEMM-AM 870, a 500-watt daytimer, received its concession on March 4, 1955. It was owned by José Martínez Ramírez and sold in the 1960s to Radio Promotora de Morelia, by which time it had moved to 960 kHz (XELY 1430 then moved to 870). During the 1980s, it carried Grupo ACIR's Radio Capital format.

XEMM was cleared to move to FM in 2011.
