= XHRD-FM =

Radio station in Pachuca, Hidalgo

XERD-AM/XHRD-FM
- Pachuca, Hidalgo; Mexico
- Frequencies: 1240 kHz; 104.5 MHz
- Branding: La Comadre

Programming
- Format: Regional Mexican

Ownership
- Owner: Grupo ACIR; (Red Central Radiofónica, S.A. de C.V.)

History
- First air date: December 1, 1945; 1994 (FM)

Technical information
- Power: 1 kW
- ERP: 10 kW

Links
- Website: La Comadre 104.5 Website

XHRD-FM 104.5/XERD-AM 1240 is a combo radio station in Pachuca, Hidalgo. It is owned by Grupo ACIR and carries a Regional Mexican format known as La Comadre.

== History ==
XERD received its first concession on October 4, 1945 as XEPK-AM, initially on 1420. The station came to air on December 1 of that year as the first radio station in Hidalgo; Governor Vicente Aguirre del Castillo was present at its inauguration. It was owned by Red Central Radiofónica. Soon after, XEPK was moved down the dial to 1190 and became a daytimer. In the 1980s, its callsign became XEFIE-AM and gave birth to an FM station XHFIE-FM 104.5.

In the mid-1990s, XEPK became XERD-AM 1240 and XHRD-FM 104.5 as part of a callsign swap with the original XERD at 1420, now sister station XHPK-FM 92.5.
