= XHPK-FM =

Radio station in Pachuca, Hidalgo, Mexico

- Pachuca; Mexico
- Broadcast area: Pachuca, Hidalgo, Mexico
- Frequency: 92.5 FM
- Branding: Mix

Programming
- Format: Adult hits

Ownership
- Owner: Grupo ACIR; (Corporación Radiofónica de Pachuca, S.A. de C.V.)

History
- First air date: September 10, 1964
- Call sign meaning: PachuCA (K)

Technical information
- ERP: 6,000 watts
- Transmitter coordinates: 20°07′22″N 98°44′06″W

Links
- Webcast: XHPK-FM listen online
- Website: Mix FM Website

XHPK-FM is a radio station in Pachuca, broadcasting on 92.5 FM. It is owned by Grupo ACIR and carries its Mix adult hits format.

== History ==
XHPK began as XERD-AM 1420, with a concession issued in September 1964 to Corporación Radiofónica de Pachuca, owned by Darío Mondragón González. XERD replaced XEPK-AM, now XERD-AM, on the frequency; the sister station moved to 1190.

In the mid-1990s, XERD and XEPK switched callsigns. In 2011, XEPK migrated to FM as XHPK-FM 92.5.
