= XHPTOJ-FM =

Radio station in Puerto Vallarta, Jalisco, Mexico

- Puerto Vallarta, Jalisco; Mexico
- Frequency: 91.1 FM (HD Radio)
- Branding: Los 40

Programming
- Format: Contemporary hit radio

Ownership
- Owner: Radiópolis; (Cadena Radiópolis, S.A. de C.V.)
- Operator: GlobalMedia
- Sister stations: XHPVA-FM, XHCJU-FM, XHCCBA-FM

History
- First air date: May 2019
- Call sign meaning: "Puerto Vallarta, Jalisco"

Technical information
- Licensing authority: CRT
- Class: B1
- ERP: 24.966 kW
- HAAT: −123.5 m (−405 ft)
- Transmitter coordinates: 20°36′34.08″N 105°13′47.24″W

Links
- Webcast: https://vallartabahia.globalmedia.mx/
- Website: http://los40.com.mx

XHPTOJ-FM is a radio station on 91.1 FM in Puerto Vallarta, Jalisco, Mexico. It is owned by Radiópolis operated by GlobalMedia and carries its Los 40 pop format.

== History ==
XHPTOJ was awarded in the IFT-4 radio auction of 2017. Televisa Radio paid 52.4 million pesos, making the station the third-most expensive in the entire auction; only XHPMAZ-FM in Mazatlán and Cancún's XHPBCQ-FM went for more money.

At the end of October 2022, GlobalMedia, which also had begun programming Ke Buena in Puerto Vallarta on XHCJU-FM along with XHPVA-FM W Radio, took over operations of XHPTOJ-FM.
