= XHRC-FM =

Radio station in Puebla, Puebla, Mexico

- Puebla, Puebla; Mexico
- Frequency: 91.7 FM
- Branding: Mix

Programming
- Format: Adult hits

Ownership
- Owner: Grupo ACIR; (XHRC-FM, S.A. de C.V.)
- Sister stations: XHRS-FM, XHHIT-FM, XHRH-FM

History
- First air date: January 19, 1982 (concession)

Technical information
- ERP: 24.8 kW

Links
- Webcast: Listen live
- Website: mixfm.mx

XHRC-FM is a radio station broadcasting on 91.7 FM in Puebla, Puebla, Mexico, owned by Grupo ACIR. The station airs an adult hits format under the brand name Mix.

== History ==
XHRC was initially granted its concession on January 19, 1982. It was originally owned by Juan Baptista Campo Rodríguez, later being sold to ACIR in 1993.
