= XHM-FM =

Radio station in Mexico City

- Mexico City; Mexico
- Frequency: 88.9 FM
- Branding: 88.9 Noticias

Programming
- Format: News and talk; contemporary music in Spanish

Ownership
- Owner: Grupo ACIR; (Radio 88.8, S.A. de C.V.)
- Sister stations: XEFR-AM, XHDFM-FM, XHPOP-FM, XHSH-FM

History
- First air date: January 1, 1970

Technical information
- Licensing authority: CRT
- Class: C
- ERP: 90 kW
- HAAT: 115 meters (377 ft)
- Transmitter coordinates: 19°23′11.2″N 99°12′21.1″W

Links
- Webcast: Listen live
- Website: 889noticias.mx

XHM-FM is a radio station in Mexico City. Located on 88.9 MHz, XHM-FM is owned by Grupo ACIR and currently broadcasts news and talk programming, along with blocks of Spanish-language rock from the 1980s and 1990s, as "88.9 Noticias". The transmitter is located atop a tower in "Ciudad de la Radio" west of the city centre.

== History ==
The concession for 88.9 FM in Mexico City was issued in October 1962, to Santiago Ontañon Núñez, but it was not until January 1, 1970, that the station began operations, known initially as "Un Oasis en FM" and later morphing into contemporary music-formatted "Sonido 89". The station's concession was given to Nuñez along with the concession for XHMM-FM, but the latter was later given to another concessionaire.

The mid-1980s saw tumult for the station. Not long after becoming "Radio Metrópoli" and seeing its format move to 99.3 FM, the 1985 Mexico City earthquake severely damaged the station's studios and forced it off the air for a month. Sonido 89 would return in October 1985, but the decade of change continued; Ondas de Alegría, the group that owned XHM, was dissolved that same year, with ARTSA taking control of XHM and its sister stations. After a brief year as "Fórmula Melódica", XHM finally found a format that stuck, soft adult contemporary "Azul 89", in 1989, with both hits and lesser-known songs in English, French and Italian. The station's signature program in the Azul 89 era was "Luna Azul", hosted by Jorge Lapuente. The station also featured programs dedicated to jazz, blues and Brazilian music.

In 1995, XHM, XHPOP-FM and XHDFM-FM were sold to Grupo ACIR, which did not make drastic changes until November 3, 2003, when XHM changed to an all-news format as "88.9 Noticias, Información que Sirve". The newly relaunched XHM featured ACIR's Panorama Informativo newscast, sports programming, other talk programs focused on finances, health and lifestyle, as well as traffic and weather reports every 15 minutes. The "Azul" format was later revived as an Internet-only station, without hosts or commercials.

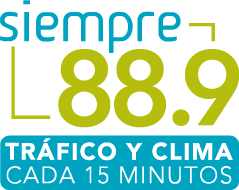
"Siempre 88.9 - Traffic and Weather Every 15 Minutes" logo used from July 2013 to January 2018

On July 5, 2013, the all-news format ended in favor of a mix between news and talk and music in Spanish from past decades, which was officially launched on July 15 as "Siempre 88.9". Several of the hosts on 88.9 Noticias were moved to other ACIR radio stations in Mexico City, but the main newscast, the sports programs, a lifestyle nightly show and the traffic reports remained. Musical programming on weekdays was scaled down in mid-2015, only airing between 10:00 pm and 6:00 am, while still airing almost all day on weekends.

On January 8, 2018, ACIR restored the 88.9 Noticias brand to XHM, though it retains musical programming on weekends and overnights.
