= XHCLI-FM =

Radio station in Culiacán, Sinaloa

- Culiacán, Sinaloa; Mexico
- Frequency: 98.5 FM
- Branding: La Comadre

Programming
- Format: Regional Mexican

Ownership
- Owner: Grupo ACIR; (Radio Alar, S.A. de C.V.)
- Sister stations: XHCNA-FM

History
- First air date: December 4, 1992 (concession)
- Call sign meaning: CuLIacán

Technical information
- Licensing authority: CRT
- Class: B
- ERP: 50.529 kW
- HAAT: 43.7 m (143 ft)
- Transmitter coordinates: 24°48′51.16″N 107°23′30.19″W

Links
- Website: comadre.mx

XHCLI-FM is a radio station on 98.5 FM in Culiacán, Sinaloa. It is owned by Grupo ACIR and carries its La Comadre Regional Mexican format.

== History ==
XHCLI received its concession on December 4, 1992. It was previously owned by María de Lourdes Palacios Andrade.
