= XHMY-FM =

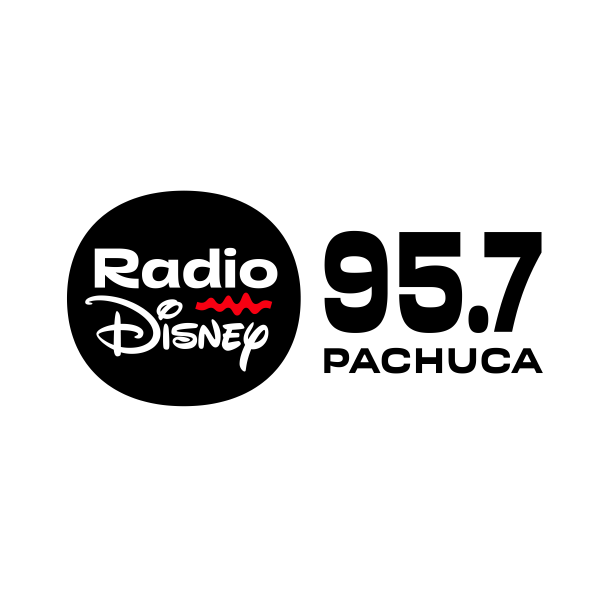
- Mineral del Monte, Hidalgo; Mexico
- Broadcast area: Pachuca, Hidalgo
- Frequency: 95.7 FM
- Branding: Radio Disney

Programming
- Format: Contemporary hit radio

Ownership
- Owner: Grupo Radiorama; (XHMY-FM, S.A. de C.V.)
- Operator: Grupo Siete
- Sister stations: XHPCA-FM

History
- First air date: November 28, 1988 (concession)

Technical information
- Class: A
- ERP: 1.5 kW
- HAAT: 94.5 m
- Transmitter coordinates: 20°06′21″N 98°44′12.5″W

Links
- Webcast: Listen live
- Website: radiodisney.disneylatino.com/mexico www.gruposiete.com.mx

XHMY-FM is a radio station in Mineral del Monte, Hidalgo, Mexico, serving Pachuca and broadcasting on 95.7 FM. It is owned by Grupo Radiorama but currently operated by Grupo Siete and carries its Radio Disney format.

== History ==
XHMY received its first concession on November 28, 1988. The concession is held by a Radiorama subsidiary, though Radiorama has not always operated it; Grupo ACIR operated the station through the end of 2017 with its Amor format, and Grupo Siete took over in September 2018, operating XHMY alongside its XHPCA-FM 106.1, which had carried Crystal during the format's original run. Crystal then moved back to XHPCA on August 29, 2022, with XHPCA's Radio Disney pop format moving to XHMY.

In 2022, the Federal Telecommunications Institute approved the relocation of the transmitter from Mineral del Monte to Cerro Cubitos in Pachuca proper, resulting in the station's nominal population served increasing from 57,687 to 420,902.
