= XHKC-FM =

Radio station in Oaxaca, Oaxaca, Mexico

- Oaxaca City, Oaxaca; Mexico
- Frequency: 100.9 FM
- Branding: La Q

Programming
- Format: Variety hits
- Affiliations: Radiopolis

Ownership
- Owner: Grupo Radio Centro (pending sale to Grupo Radio Cañón); (Promotora de Radiodifusión del Sureste, S.A. de C.V.)
- Operator: Grupo Radio Cañón
- Sister stations: XHOCA-FM

History
- First air date: April 8, 1981 (concession); 1994 (FM)
- Former call signs: XEKC-AM (1981–2014)
- Former frequencies: 1460 kHz (1981–2014)

Technical information
- ERP: 10 kW
- Transmitter coordinates: 17°04′11″N 96°43′56″W

Links
- Webcast: Listen live
- Website: grupo-rc.mx

XHKC-FM 100.9 is a radio station in Oaxaca City, Oaxaca, Mexico. The station is owned by Grupo Radio Cañón and carries the La Q tropical music format from Radiópolis.

== History ==
XHKC-FM/XEKC-AM logo until 2018 as Planeta.

XEKC-AM received its first concession on April 8, 1981. It was owned by La Voz de Oaxaca, S.A. and expanded to FM in 1994.

On May 21, 2021, the station changes its brand, from "Planeta" pop format to "La Z" regional Mexican format.

La Z ran on XHKC until October 13, 2026, when Grupo Radio Centro dropped its formats from the cluster it ran in the market.

XHKC was leased to Grupo Radio Cañón and took the La Q format from Radiópolis.
