= XECO-AM =

Radio station in Mexico City

- Mexico City; Mexico
- Broadcast area: Greater Mexico City
- Frequency: 1380 AM
- Branding: Romántica 1380

Programming
- Format: Romantic music

Ownership
- Owner: Grupo Audiorama Comunicaciones; (Publicidad Comercial de México, S.A. de C.V.)
- Sister stations: XEUR-AM, XEVOZ-AM, XEWF-AM

History
- First air date: September 30, 1934
- Former call signs: XEMX-AM (1934-1960s or 1970s)
- Call sign meaning: Radio Eco, name in the 1970s

Technical information
- Licensing authority: CRT
- Class: B
- Power: 50 kW day 5 kW night
- Transmitter coordinates: 19°23′45.6″N 99°07′15.6″W

Links
- Webcast: Listen live
- Website: audiorama.mx

XECO-AM is a radio station on 1380 AM in Mexico City. XECO-AM is owned by Grupo Audiorama Comunicaciones and broadcasts a romantic music format as "Romántica".

== History ==
The first concession for what is now XECO began as XEMX-AM, awarded on September 30, 1934 to Alonso Traslosheros Ávalos. Originally the station was located on 1280 kHz and had a power of 120 watts. In 1941 it was sold to Guillermo Robles, who sold it in turn to Publicidad Comercial de México, S.A., in 1946. By 1954, the station had moved up the dial to 1380 kHz, and in the 1960s the station was owned by Núcleo Radio Mil and broadcast a format targeted at women as "Radio Femenina".

Sometime in the late 1960s or 1970s, the station was overhauled as XECO-AM, becoming "Radio Eco 13-80" and ditching its format for a contemporary music format. In 1987, this transformed into an oldies format as "Dimensión 13-80". In 1995, Radiorama bought XECO and XEUR-AM 1530 from what was now known as NRM Comunicaciones, gaining entry into the Mexico City media market, XECO became "La Poderosa 13-80" airing a Regional Mexican format and was changed to romantic music format as "Romántica 13-80" in 1998. The first incarnation of this format competed with similar stations up and down the dial; the format was innovative and depended largely on its hosts and DJs.

On May 17, 2005, at 1:35pm, the format was abruptly dropped to become "Ke Buena" and an AM simulcast of XEQ-FM 92.9; even the station's personalities were taken by surprise at the format change. During this one-year period, Televisa Radio programmed almost all of the station's broadcast day except for some religious programs on AM only that were programmed by Radiorama. Romántica returned on September 1, 2006, this time without the personalities that had characterized it in its first run on air.
