= XHRTP-FM =

Radio station in San Martín Texmelucan, Puebla, Mexico

- San Martín Texmelucan, Puebla; Mexico
- Frequency: 90.7 MHz
- Branding: La Intensa

Programming
- Format: Regional Mexican

Ownership
- Owner: Grupo Radiorama; (XERTP, S.A. de C.V.)
- Operator: Cadena In
- Sister stations: XHEZAR-FM

History
- First air date: January 4, 1971 (concession)
- Call sign meaning: Radio Texmelucan Puebla

Technical information
- Class: AA
- ERP: 200 watts
- HAAT: 216 meters
- Transmitter coordinates: 19°19′38″N 98°26′31.14″W

Links
- Webcast: Listen live
- Website: cadenain.com

XHRTP-FM is a radio station on 90.7 FM in San Martín Texmelucan, Puebla. It is owned by Grupo Radiorama and operated by Cadena In, and carries a Regional Mexican format known as La Intensa.

== History ==
XERTP-AM 1600 received its concession on January 4, 1971, soon being moved to 1540. It was owned by Radio Texmelucan, S.A.

In January 2009, XERTP was moved to 880 kHz and cut its power from 2.5 kW to 1 kW during the day.

XERTP migrated to FM in 2010.

Between 2019 and January 2020, the station was operated by Grupo Siete Comunicación as Crystal FM. The operating contract ended in late January 2020 and Radiorama returned to operating XHRTP.

In April 2025, Grupo Radiorama leased XHRTP and its sister station XHEZAR-FM to Intolerancia Diario. On May 7, the "La Intensa" format was launched.
