= XHPUE-FM =

Radio station in Puebla, Puebla

- Puebla, Puebla; Mexico
- Frequency: 104.3 MHz (HD Radio)
- Branding: Pasión FM

Programming
- Format: Adult contemporary

Ownership
- Owner: Cinco Radio; (Operadora de Radio de Puebla, S.A. de C.V.)
- Sister stations: XEHR-AM, XEPOP-AM, XHNP-FM

History
- First air date: June 17, 1961 (concession)
- Former call signs: XEXD-AM
- Former frequencies: 1450 kHz (1961–1996); 1210 kHz (1996—2020); 92.1 MHz (2018–2020)
- Call sign meaning: Puebla

Technical information
- Class: A
- ERP: 1,000 watts
- HAAT: 30.6 meters
- Transmitter coordinates: 19°03′44″N 98°12′51″W

Links
- Webcast: Listen live
- Website: pasion.fm

XHPUE-FM is a radio station on 104.3 FM in Puebla, Puebla, in Mexico. It is owned by Cinco Radio and is known as Pasión FM.

== History ==
XEPUE's history begins with the award of XEXD-AM 1450 in Atlixco to Georgina Martínez Gardeazabal on June 17, 1961. XEXD broadcast to Atlixco with 500 watts during the day and 250 at night. By the 1980s, XEXD had become XEPUE-AM, but it remained in Atlixco.

After the station's 1996 sale to Operadora de Radio de Puebla, XEPUE moved to Puebla on 1210 kHz.

On April 11, 2018, the Federal Telecommunications Institute approved the migration of XEPUE to FM as XHPUE-FM 92.1. The frequency had previously been awarded to XEEG-AM 1280, but that station did not pay the fee to migrate. XHPUE signed on the air August 15, 2018, and the La Mexicana Regional Mexican format previously on 1210 was immediately replaced with the Pasión FM format previously on XHJE-FM 94.1. Within three months, Kick FM with an electronic music format would be added at night, airing between 8 p.m. and 6 a.m. The AM station was shut down on May 20, 2020.

The station moved to 104.3 MHz on October 1, 2020, at 1 p.m., as the result of an order by the IFT after XEEG successfully appealed the denial of the 92.1 frequency, which was determined to be due to an error by the IFT. The Kick electronic music block was dropped in November 2021.
