= XHJE-FM =

Radio station in Puebla, Puebla, Mexico

Puebla, Puebla; Mexico
- Broadcast area: Puebla, Puebla
- Frequency: 94.1 MHz
- Branding: Exa FM

Programming
- Format: Pop

Ownership
- Owner: MVS Radio; (Stereorey México, S.A.)

History
- First air date: 1971
- Call sign meaning: Original concessionaire Juan José Espejo Puente

Technical information
- Class: B1
- ERP: 20 kW
- Transmitter coordinates: 19°03′47.4″N 98°12′52.7″W

Links
- Website: exafm.com/puebla

XHJE-FM is a radio station on 94.1 FM in Puebla, Puebla, Mexico. The station is owned by MVS Radio and carries its Exa FM pop format.

== History ==
Logo as Más FM, used until 2016

XHJE began broadcasting in 1971 and received its first concession on December 15, 1972, becoming the first FM station in the state. It was owned by Juan José Espejo Puente and became a part of Grupo HR (now Cinco Radio); the original format was known as La Chica Musical. In the mid-1990s, XHJE converted to "Mix FM", an English adult contemporary brand from Grupo ACIR.

In 2002, the pop music format from XHNP-FM 89.3 moved to XHJE-FM and was rebranded "Más 94". On March 13, 2016, XHJE flipped to romantic music as Pasión FM; this format moved to new station XHPUE-FM 92.1 on August 15, 2018, leaving XHJE-FM without a format. The move came after Cinco Radio was reported to have sold or leased XHJE to MVS Radio, which would move the Exa FM format from 98.7 XHPBA-FM. Exa was formally announced for XHJE on September 24, 2018, a week after XHPBA relaunched as Puebla's Los 40 station, with a full launch slated for October 1.

On October 3, 2018, the IFT approved the transfer of shares in Súper Sonido en Frecuencia Modulada from Grupo Salas, S.A. de C.V., Carlos Manuel Flores Núñez, Juan José de Jesús Espejo Munguía and Martha Verónica Martínez Valdivia to a subsidiary of MVS Radio.
