= XHHIT-FM (Puebla) =

Radio station in Puebla, Puebla

- San Bernardino Tlaxcalancingo–Puebla, Puebla; Mexico
- Frequency: 105.5 MHz (HD Radio)
- Branding: La Comadre

Programming
- Format: Grupera

Ownership
- Owner: Grupo ACIR; (Radio Poblana, S.A. de C.V.)
- Sister stations: XHRS-FM, XHRC-FM, XHRH-FM

History
- First air date: September 3, 1968 (concession); November 15, 2018 (FM)
- Former call signs: XEHIT-AM
- Former frequencies: 1310 kHz (1968–2019); 95.5 MHz (2018–2020)
- Call sign meaning: "Hit"

Technical information
- Class: A
- ERP: 400 watts
- HAAT: 27.5 m
- Transmitter coordinates: 19°02′36.3″N 98°12′43.14″W

Links
- Website: lacomadre.mx

XHHIT-FM is a radio station on 105.5 FM in San Bernardino Tlaxcalancingo, Puebla, in Mexico. It carries Grupo ACIR's La Comadre grupera format.

== History ==
XEHIT-AM 1310 AM received its concession on September 3, 1968. It was later acquired by Grupo ACIR.

On April 11, 2018, the Federal Telecommunications Institute approved the migration of XEHIT to FM as XHHIT-FM 95.5. The frequency had previously been awarded to XEZT-AM 1250, but that station did not pay the fee to migrate. XHHIT signed on the air November 15, 2018.

After it emerged that the IFT had made an error that had led to the denial of XEZT's application and was ordered by a court to allow XEZT to migrate to 95.5 FM, the IFT approved the frequency change of XHHIT-FM to 105.5 MHz in September 2020, being carried out on October 6 and paired with a format flip from Spanish oldies as Radio Felicidad to La Comadre.

In November 2019, XEHIT-AM was taken off the air after a year of simulcasting.
