= XELFFS-AM =

Currently silent
- Izúcar de Matamoros, Puebla; Mexico
- Frequency: 980 AM

Ownership
- Owner: Luis Francisco Fierro Sosa

History
- First air date: 2019
- Call sign meaning: Luis Francisco Fierro Sosa

Technical information
- Class: B
- Power: 5 kW (day)
- Transmitter coordinates: 18°36′06.2″N 98°28′29″W

XELFFS-AM is a radio station on 980 AM in Izúcar de Matamoros, Puebla. currently silent.

== History ==
XELFFS was awarded in the IFT-4 radio auction of 2017 for a winning bid of 133,000 pesos. The station signed on in late 2019 and was originally known as Mi Gente.

On February 1, 2021, the station affiliated with Tribuna Comunicación and installed its "La Magnífica" Regional Mexican format, used at XHZT-FM in the city of Puebla.
