= XEUR-AM =

Radio station in Mexico City

Simulcast of XEVOZ-AM 1590
- Mexico City; Mexico
- Broadcast area: Greater Mexico City
- Frequency: 1530 AM
- Branding: Buenisiima

Programming
- Format: Tropical music

Ownership
- Owner: Grupo Audiorama Comunicaciones; (Radio Unión Texcoco, S.A.)
- Sister stations: XECO-AM, XEWF-AM, XEVOZ-AM

History
- First air date: 1964

Technical information
- Licensing authority: CRT
- Class: B
- Power: 50,000 watts (day); 1,000 watts (night)
- Transmitter coordinates: 19°23′45.6″N 99°07′15.6″W
- Repeater: XEVOZ-AM 1590 kHz (Mexico City)

Links
- Webcast: Listen live
- Website: audiorama.mx

XEUR-AM is a radio station licensed to and located in Mexico City. Broadcasting on 1530 AM is a United States clear-channel frequency. The station's transmitter is located in the borough of Iztacalco.

== History ==
Núcleo Radio Mil signed XEUR on in 1974, though the concession had been awarded a decade earlier. In 1986, it became known as Radio Onda, with a pioneering format of Latin music.

In 1995, NRM sold XEUR and XECO-AM to Radiorama, marking the latter's entry into the Mexico City radio market. For a brief time, the station was operated by Grupo Siete Comunicación, first with the Super Estelar grupera format and then talk radio-formatted Cambio 1530. Radiorama reacquired the station the next year, and for most of the next 15 years, 1530 AM underwent constant changes in format and name: La Poderosa 1530 (1996–98), instrumental Tu Música 1530 (1998–2000), La Mexicana (2000–01), Red W Interactiva (2001-2002 during its three-month on-air tenure), La Positiva 1530 (talk), Mariachi Estéreo, La Voz del Valle (yet again talk), Radio Mexicana (2005–07), kid-targeted Colorín ColoRadio from XEWF-AM 540 (May 15–November 20, 2007), grupera and pop-formatted Escaparate 1530 (2007–08), tropical Radio Fiesta (2008–January, 29, 2010), Rock al Extremo (for three days in January 2010), and grupera La Jefa under contract again to Grupo Siete Comunicación, combined with religious music known as Voz de Paz (February 13–May 1, 2010).

On June 1, 2010, 1530 returned to Radio Fiesta in its longest-running format since the 1990s, but in July 2014, change returned as the station became pop-formatted Juventud 1530 AM and then music in English from the 1970s, 80s and 90s, Éxtasis Digital, on April 1, 2015.

On December 10, 2020, Éxtasis Digital went off the air and was replaced by Radio Maria, marking the Catholic network's first station in Mexico City. On January 7, 2022, Radio María programming was replaced by a simulcast of XEVOZ-AM with a tropical music format Buenisiima.
