= XHIL-FM =

Radio station in Veracruz, Veracruz, Mexico

- Veracruz, Veracruz; Mexico
- Frequency: 88.5 MHz
- Branding: Máxima

Programming
- Format: Contemporary hit radio

Ownership
- Owner: Radio SA; (Radio XHIL, S. de R.L. de C.V.)
- Sister stations: XHCS-FM

History
- First air date: January 18, 1955 (concession)
- Former call signs: XEOD-AM, XEIL-AM
- Former frequencies: 1090 kHz

Technical information
- Licensing authority: CRT
- Class: B1
- ERP: 25 kW
- HAAT: 43.42 m
- Transmitter coordinates: 19°10′06″N 96°08′03″W

Links
- Webcast: Listen live
- Website: maxplay.com.mx

XHIL-FM is a radio station on 88.5 FM in Veracruz, Veracruz, Mexico. It is owned by Radio SA and is known as Máxima.

== History ==
XHIL as 88.5 Mix, used from 2017 to 2021

XEOD-AM 1090 received its concession on January 18, 1955. The Boca del Río-based station was owned by Radiofónica Veracruzana, S.A. and broadcast with 1,000 watts.

In 1986, XEOD was sold to a group headed by Angel López Corona and including nine other people. The station became known as XEIL-AM. It was sold to ACIR in 1994.

When XEIL was approved to migrate to FM in 2010, it became the second station ACIR owned to carry the XHIL-FM call sign. The first was XHIL-FM in Monterrey, which lost its call sign when it was sold by ACIR.

In November 2021, Grupo ACIR reached a deal to sell XHIL and XHCS-FM 103.7 to Radio S.A. November 23 was the last day for the ACIR Amor and Mix formats on these stations. XHIL flipped from English adult contemporary/classic hits as "Mix" to contemporary hit radio using Radio SA's Máxima brand on January 1, 2022.
