= XHSH-FM =

Radio station in Mexico City

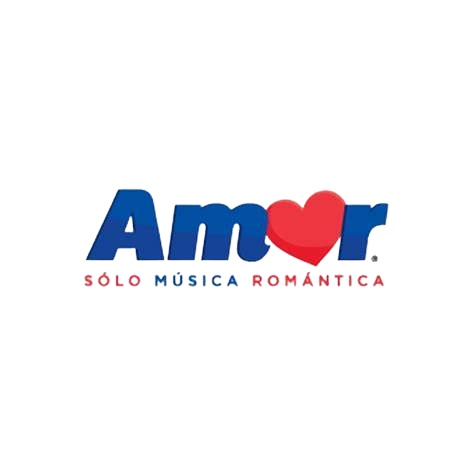
- Mexico City; Mexico
- Broadcast area: Greater Mexico City
- Frequency: 95.3 MHz
- Branding: Amor

Programming
- Format: Contemporary music in Spanish

Ownership
- Owner: Grupo ACIR; (Radio XHSH, S. de R. L. de C. V.)

History
- First air date: August 4, 1970
- Call sign meaning: Narciso Solís Huerta (original concessionaire)

Technical information
- Licensing authority: CRT
- Class: C1
- ERP: 100 kW
- HAAT: 115 meters (377 ft)
- Transmitter coordinates: 19°23′11.2″N 99°12′21.1″W

Links
- Webcast: XHSH-FM
- Website: http://www.amorfm.mx/

XHSH-FM is a radio station in Mexico City. Broadcasting on 95.3 FM, XHSH-FM carries contemporary music in Spanish from the 1990s until the present, with a focus on romantic songs under the name "Amor".

== History ==
XHSH-FM's history begins with a concession awarded on May 14, 1964 to Narciso Solis Huerta, who eventually sold it to FM Radio, S.A. on November 8, 1968. The station was launched by FM Radio on August 4, 1970 as "Radio Amistad", carrying a contemporary music format in English and Spanish.

In 1986, the station became "Stereo Nova", simulcasting XEL-AM 1260 and carrying youth music in Spanish. It returned to its old name as "Stereo Amistad" in the late 1988, with English-language contemporary music, jazz and New Age. The name was kept when the station changed to Spanish-language pop and romance music in 1993, but the station became "Mix 95.3", with English contemporary music, the following year.

In May 1995, Grupo ACIR, owner of FM Radio, S.A. de C.V., added 88.9, 99.3 and 106.5 FM to its stable; previously XHSH was its only Mexico City station. This resulted in the Panorama Informativo newscast moving to 88.9 and the Mix format to 106.5. XHSH became "OK" with tropical music, then became "La Comadre" with a grupera format on November 24, and from 1997 to 2001 contemporary music in Spanish as "Inolvidable". Its format was renamed "Amor" in September 2001, which remains to this day.
