= SICOM Radio =

State radio network of Puebla

Coordinates: 19°04′39″N 98°20′42″W

- Broadcast area: Puebla

Programming
- Format: Public radio

Ownership
- Owner: Government of the State of Puebla

Links
- Webcast: www.setpuebla.mx/radio/radioenvivo/
- Website: sicom.gob.mx/radio/

SICOM Radio is the state radio network of the Mexican state of Puebla. It broadcasts on 8 transmitters in the state with most content originating from the state capital in Puebla. It and SICOM Televisión form part of the Spanish: Sistema de Información y Comunicación (Information and Communication System, SICOM).

== History ==
XHCOM received its permit in 1997. The state received the original permits for the seven other stations in 2002. The repeaters branded as their locality name and FM (for instance, Puebla FM, Tehuacán FM, Acatlán FM) until the system was renamed Sistema Estatal de Telecomunicaciones (State Telecommunications System, SET). In 2023, the original SICOM name was restored after a state government study found that eight out of ten residents surveyed across 21 municipalities continued to call the state network SICOM.

== Transmitters ==
Callsign	Frequency	City	ERP
XHCOM-FM	105.9	Santa Isabel Cholula/Puebla	10 kW
XHEUH-FM	93.1	Tehuacán	15 kW
XHAOP-FM	95.3	Acatlán de Osorio	2 kW
XHCPCM-FM	98.9	Huauchinango	5.6 kW
XHCPCL-FM	107.5	Izúcar de Matamoros	2 kW
XHLIB-FM	95.9	Libres	15 kW
XHTEZ-FM	90.9	Teziutlán	2 kW
XHZTP-FM	105.3	Zacatlán	2 kW
