= XHTCP-FM =

Radio station in Tehuacán, Puebla

- Tehuacán, Puebla; Mexico
- Frequency: 90.7 FM
- Branding: Romántica

Programming
- Format: Romantic

Ownership
- Owner: Radiorama; (XETCP-AM, S.A. de C.V.)
- Operator: Grupo AS Comunicación
- Sister stations: XHTEU-FM

History
- First air date: September 25, 1996 (concession)
- Call sign meaning: From "Tehuacán Puebla"

Technical information
- ERP: 25 kW
- Transmitter coordinates: 18°27′42″N 97°23′36″W

Links
- Webcast: server3.sit-mexico.com:2199/..
- Website: radioramatehuacan.com

XHTCP-FM is a radio station on 90.7 FM in Tehuacán, Puebla. It is owned by Radiorama, It is operated by Grupo AS Comunicación and carries a romantic format known as Romántica.

== History ==
XETCP-AM 1600 received its concession on September 25, 1996, soon moving to 1230. It has always been owned by Radiorama.

XETCP was cleared to move to FM in 2011.
