= XHZT-FM =

Radio station in Puebla, Puebla, Mexico

- Puebla, Puebla; Mexico
- Frequency: 95.5 MHz (HD Radio)
- Branding: La Magnífica

Programming
- Format: Regional Mexican

Ownership
- Owner: Tribuna Comunicación; (Radio Principal, S.A. de C.V.)
- Sister stations: XHPBA-FM

History
- First air date: November 26, 1970; November 24, 2021 (FM)
- Former call signs: XEZT-AM
- Former frequencies: 1250 kHz (1970–2023)

Technical information
- Class: A
- ERP: 1,650 watts
- HAAT: 28.2 meters
- Transmitter coordinates: 19°03′24.4″N 98°13′46″W

Links
- Webcast: Listen live
- Website: lamagnificafm.com

XHZT-FM is a radio station on 95.5 FM in Puebla, Puebla. It is owned by Tribuna Comunicación and known as La Magnífica, carrying a Regional Mexican format.

== History ==
La Mejor logo used through 2018

XEZT-AM 1250 received its concession on November 26, 1970. It was owned by Juan Bautista Ponce de León Terán and sold to the current concessionaire in 1976.

On July 14, 2017, the Federal Telecommunications Institute (IFT) approved the migration of XEZT to FM as XHZT-FM on 95.5, but the station did not yet pay the fee to migrate to FM. The frequency was then awarded to XEHIT-AM to migrate as XHHIT-FM, which signed on in November 2018.

Until 2018, XEZT carried the La Mejor Regional Mexican format from MVS Radio. The station left the network in September 2018, but returned to Regional Mexican music under the "La Magnífica" name in October 2019.

It later emerged that an error by the IFT led to Tribuna Comunicación underpaying the required fee to migrate, an error also made with respect to the migration of XEEG-AM 1280. Tribuna sued the IFT in court and successfully won an order to have 95.5 made available for its use. In 2020, XHHIT-FM was moved to 105.5 MHz in compliance with the court order; on November 24, 2021, La Magnífica was then launched on FM.
