= XHOQ-FM =

Radio station in Oaxaca, Oaxaca

- Oaxaca, Oaxaca; Mexico
- Frequency: 100.1 FM
- Branding: La Poderosa

Programming
- Format: Grupera
- Affiliations: Grupo Radiorama

Ownership
- Owner: Organización Radiofónica Mexicana; (Radiodifusora XHOQ-FM, S.A. de C.V.)
- Operator: Grupo AS
- Sister stations: XHEOA-FM, XHYN-FM

History
- First air date: November 28, 1988 (concession)

Technical information
- Class: B1
- ERP: 9.55 kW
- HAAT: -55.1 meters
- Transmitter coordinates: 17°04′13″N 96°43′51″W

Links
- Webcast: Listen live
- Website: lapoderosalaquetegusta.com

XHOQ-FM is a radio station on 100.1 FM in Oaxaca, Oaxaca, Mexico. It is operated by Grupo AS and carries its La Poderosa grupera format.

== History ==
XHOQ received its concession on November 28, 1988. Until 2014, it was owned by Promociones Radiofónicas Culturales, S.A.
