= XHVAY-FM =

Radio station in Puerto Vallarta, Jalisco

XEVAY-AM/XHVAY-FM
- Puerto Vallarta, Jalisco; Mexico
- Broadcast area: Puerto Vallarta, Jalisco
- Frequencies: 740 kHz; 92.7 MHz
- Branding: Mix

Programming
- Format: Adult hits

Ownership
- Owner: Grupo ACIR; (Radio Vallarta, S.A. de C.V.)
- Sister stations: XHME-FM

History
- First air date: December 29, 1986 (concession); 1994 (FM)
- Call sign meaning: VALL (Y) arta

Technical information
- Licensing authority: CRT
- Class: B1 (FM); C (AM)
- Power: 1 kW
- ERP: 10 kW
- HAAT: −47.3 m (−155 ft)
- Transmitter coordinates: 20°36′34.2″N 105°13′37.7″W

Links
- Website: mixfm.mx

XHVAY-FM 92.7/XEVAY-AM 740 is a combo radio station in Puerto Vallarta, Jalisco. It is owned by Grupo ACIR and carries its 'Mix' English-language adult hits format.

== History ==
XEVAY received its first concession on December 29, 1986. It was owned by Nenette Semenow Canan.

In 1994, XEVAY became an AM-FM combo.
