= XHME-FM =

Radio station in Puerto Vallarta, Jalisco

- Puerto Vallarta, Jalisco; Mexico
- Frequency: 89.5 FM
- Branding: Match FM

Programming
- Format: Hot adult contemporary

Ownership
- Owner: Grupo ACIR; (Radio XHME Puerto Vallarta, S. de R.L. de C.V.)
- Sister stations: XEVAY/XHVAY

History
- First air date: March 1, 1978 (concession)
- Call sign meaning: Manuel Ayala Estrada (original concessionaire)

Technical information
- Licensing authority: CRT
- Class: B
- ERP: 50.58 kW
- HAAT: −52.3 m (−172 ft)
- Transmitter coordinates: 20°36′39″N 105°13′34″W

Links
- Website: matchmx.fm

XHME-FM is a radio station on 89.5 FM in Puerto Vallarta, Jalisco. The station is owned by Grupo ACIR and carries its Match hot adult contemporary format.

== History ==
XHME received its concession on March 1, 1978. It was owned by Manuel Ayala Estrada. By the 1990s, it was owned by ACIR.

=== Match ===
On December 25, 2019, Disney and ACIR announced they were mutually ending their relationship, which had covered twelve Mexican cities. Ten of the twelve Radio Disney stations, including XHME, were transitioned to ACIR's replacement pop format, Match.
