= XHCS-FM =

Radio station in Veracruz, Veracruz, Mexico

- Veracruz, Veracruz; Mexico
- Frequency: 103.7 MHz
- Branding: Love

Programming
- Format: Romantic music

Ownership
- Owner: Radio SA; (Radio Mil del Puerto, S. de R.L. de C.V.)
- Sister stations: XHIL-FM

History
- First air date: September 29, 1983 (concession)
- Call sign meaning: For original concessionaire Carmen Luz Salas Peyro

Technical information
- Licensing authority: CRT
- Class: B
- ERP: 30 kW
- HAAT: 53.80 m

Links
- Webcast: Listen live
- Website: maxplay.com.mx

XHCS-FM is a radio station on 103.7 FM in Veracruz, Veracruz, Mexico. It is owned by Radio SA and is known as Love.

== History ==
XHCS as Amor, used from 2017 to 2021

XHCS received its concession on September 29, 1983. It was owned by Carmen Luz Salas Peyro until the 1990s, when it was sold to Radio Mil del Puerto, an ACIR company.

In November 2021, Grupo ACIR reached a deal to sell XHCS and XHIL-FM 88.5 to Radio SA. November 23 was the last day for the ACIR Amor and Mix formats on these stations. XHCS retained the romantic music format under the name of "Música con Amor" (Music with Love). From Monday, April 11, 2022, the station standardizes its image with the rest of the romantic stations of the group Radio SA as Love.
