= XHNP-FM =

Radio station in Puebla, Puebla, Mexico

- Puebla, Puebla; Mexico
- Frequency: 89.3 MHz
- Branding: La Grupera

Programming
- Format: Regional Mexican

Ownership
- Owner: Cinco Radio; (Operadora de Radio de Puebla, S.A. de C.V.)
- Sister stations: XEHR-AM, XEPOP-AM, XHPUE-FM

History
- First air date: April 17, 1975 (concession)

Technical information
- ERP: 50 kW

Links
- Webcast: Listen live
- Website: lagrupera.mx

XHNP-FM is a radio station on 89.3 FM in Puebla, Puebla. The station is owned by Cinco Radio and carries a Regional Mexican format known as La Grupera.

== History ==
XHNP received its first concession on April 17, 1975. It was owned by Ramón Bojalil Bojalil and run by Organización Radio Oro (now Grupo Oro) and carried a pop format known as Estéreo Uno. The station later flipped to a tropical music format known as Estereo Tropicálida.

In the late 1980s, XHNP was sold to Cinco Radio, which relaunched it as Fantasía with a pop format, changed to Stereo 89.3 in the 1990s. In 2002, XHNP became La Grupera with a Regional Mexican format, and the pop music format was moved to XHJE-FM 94.1 (rechristened as Más 94).
