= XHVC-FM =

Radio station in Puebla, Puebla

- Puebla, Puebla; Mexico
- Frequency: 102.1 FM
- Branding: Tropical Caliente

Programming
- Format: Grupera

Ownership
- Owner: Grupo JV Comunicaciones (A Tiempo Noticias); (Radio XHVC-FM, S.A. de C.V.)

History
- First air date: April 1, 1981 (concession)
- Former frequencies: 90.9 MHz (1981–1989)
- Call sign meaning: Original concessionaire Vicente Capillo Rocha

Technical information
- ERP: 50 kW
- Transmitter coordinates: 19°03′24.4″N 98°13′46″W

Links
- Webcast: Listen live
- Website: atiemponoticias.mx

XHVC-FM is a radio station on 102.1 FM in Puebla, Puebla, Mexico. XHVC-FM is owned by Grupo JV Comunicaciones (A Tiempo Noticias) and carries a grupera format known as Tropical Caliente.

== History ==
Logo used as La Tropical Caliente 102.1 FM Radio until December 2021

XHVC received its first concession on December 21, 1978. It was owned by Vicente Capillo Rocha and originally broadcast on 90.9 MHz.

From 1986 to 2001, it was operated by Cinco Radio. It was also owned by Grupo ACIR at some point.
