= XHTEU-FM =

Radio station in Tehuacán, Puebla

- Tehuacán, Puebla; Mexico
- Frequency: 99.1 FM
- Branding: La Poderosa

Programming
- Format: Grupera

Ownership
- Owner: Radiorama; (Radio Oriental, S.A. de C.V.)
- Operator: Grupo AS
- Sister stations: XHTCP-FM

History
- First air date: November 12, 1992 (concession)
- Call sign meaning: From "Tehuacán"

Technical information
- Class: B1
- ERP: 14.57 kW

Links
- Webcast: XHTEU
- Website: www.radiorama-tehuacan.com/sitio/

XHTEU-FM is a radio station on 99.1 FM in Tehuacán, Puebla. It is owned by Radiorama and operated by Grupo AS Comunicación and carries its grupera format known as La Poderosa.

== History ==
XHTEU received its concession on November 12, 1992. It was owned by Carlos Caballero Ávila. In 1999, ownership was transferred to Radio Oriental.
