= XHEOA-FM =

Radio station in Oaxaca City, Oaxaca, Mexico

XHEOA-FM / XEOA-AM
- Oaxaca City, Oaxaca; Mexico
- Frequency: 94.9 FM / 570 AM
- Branding: La Mexicana

Programming
- Format: Regional Mexican
- Affiliations: Grupo Radiorama

Ownership
- Owner: Organización Radiofónica Mexicana; (Radiodifusora XEOA-AM, S.A. de C.V.)
- Operator: Grupo AS
- Sister stations: XHOQ-FM, XHYN-FM

History
- First air date: June 28, 1956 (concession)
- Call sign meaning: "Oaxaca"

Technical information
- Class: B1
- ERP: 25 kW
- HAAT: -55.1 m
- Transmitter coordinates: 17°04′13″N 96°43′51″W

Links
- Webcast: Listen live
- Website: grupoasradio.com

XHEOA-FM/XEOA-AM is a Mexico radio station on 94.9 FM and 570 AM in Oaxaca City, Oaxaca, Mexico. It is owned by Radiorama and known as La Mexicana with a regional Mexican format.

== History ==
XEOA-AM 570 received its concession on June 28, 1956. It broadcast with 5,000 watts day and 250 night. It was sold from Radio Oaxaca, S.A., to the current concessionaire in 2000.

XEOA received approval to migrate to FM in 2010, but it was required to maintain its AM station, as communities could lose radio service were the AM station to go off the air.
