= XHORO-FM =

Radio station in Puebla, Mexico

Puebla, Puebla; Mexico
- Broadcast area: Puebla, Puebla
- Frequency: 94.9 FM (HD Radio)
- Branding: Oro 94.9

Programming
- Format: English classic hits

Ownership
- Owner: Grupo Oro; (Corporación Radiofónica de Puebla, S.A.)
- Sister stations: XHECD-FM

History
- First air date: February 14, 1979
- Call sign meaning: "Oro" is Spanish for gold

Technical information
- ERP: 50 kW

Links
- Webcast: Listen live
- Website: www.orohits949.com

XHORO-FM is a radio station on 94.9 FM in Puebla, Puebla, Mexico. The station is owned by Grupo ORO and carries an English classic hits format known as Oro 94.9, Solo Hits.

== History ==
Logo used until December 2017

XHORO received its first concession on December 21, 1978 and signed on February 14, 1979. It was owned by Elba Yolanda Brust Carmona. It was named "El y Ella", its logo being a rose.

Later it became "Radio Oro 94.9" broadcasting ballads in Spanish. In 1998 it changed its programming to the contemporary format in English, as well as a pop and rock format.

In late 2017 XHORO rebranded "Oro 94.9 Solo Hits" broadcasts in English-language classic hits.
