= XEHR-AM =

Radio station in Puebla, Puebla, Mexico

- Puebla, Puebla; Mexico
- Frequency: 1090 kHz
- Branding: La HR

Programming
- Format: Talk

Ownership
- Owner: Cinco Radio; (Empresa Radiodifusora de Puebla XEHR, S.A. de C.V.)
- Sister stations: XEPOP-AM, XHNP-FM, XHPUE-FM

History
- First air date: November 30, 1939
- Former frequencies: 1230 kHz (1939–1942);

Technical information
- Power: 2,500 watts day 1,000 watts night
- Transmitter coordinates: 19°03′47.3″N 98°12′52.8″W

Links
- Webcast: Listen live
- Website: lahr.mx

XEHR-AM is a radio station on 1090 AM in Puebla, Puebla, Mexico. It is owned by Cinco Radio and carries a talk format known as La HR.

== History ==
Previously used logo

XEHR was the first radio station in Puebla. It received its concession on September 12, 1939, and was owned by Manuel R. Canales until 1965.
