= XEL-AM =

Radio station in Mexico City

- Los Reyes Acaquilpan, State of Mexico; Mexico
- Broadcast area: Greater Mexico City
- Frequency: 1260 kHz
- Branding: XEL 1260 AM

Programming
- Format: Contemporary pop in English and Spanish
- Affiliations: Radiópolis

Ownership
- Owner: Grupo ACIR (pending sale to Grupo Radio Cañón); (Radio XEL, S. de R. L. de C. V.)
- Operator: Grupo Radio Cañón
- Sister stations: XEABC-AM

History
- First air date: October 12, 1930
- Former call signs: XETA-AM

Technical information
- Licensing authority: CRT
- Class: B
- Power: 35 kW day; 5 kW night
- Transmitter coordinates: 19°21′38.4″N 98°59′33.7″W

Links
- Webcast: Listen live
- Website: grupo-rc.mx

XEL-AM is a radio station in Los Reyes Acaquilpan, State of Mexico, serving Mexico City. Broadcasting on 1260 kHz, XEL-AM is operated by Grupo Radio Cañón and carries its Pop format.

== History ==
The first concession for what would become XEL was actually for a station on 1140 kHz with the call sign XETA, made to Manuel Espinosa Tagle on October 12, 1930. The station spent the next 17 years under a revolving door of owners: Esperanza Romero González, Banco Capitalizador de Ahorros, Financiera de Inversiones, Ramón Ferreiro Rodriguez, Fidel Hernández Calderón, and finally stability under Radio Impulsora Hérdez, S.A. The station became XEL-AM in 1952 and moved to 1260 kHz in the early 1960s. The station for most of its life carried the name "Radio Capital".

In 1964, accountant Francisco Ibarra bought the station, making it Grupo ACIR's first station in Mexico City. The format was changed to rock in English with the slogan Una buena costumbre de la gente joven ("A good habit of young people"). In 1989, the station became the general format "Radio ACIR", a format moved from XEVOZ-AM 1590; that station picked up the rock music format and Radio Capital name.

On November 3, 2003, the station was relaunched as "La 12 60" with a focus on self-help, health and family affairs matters.

On July 1, 2015, as part of larger changes at Grupo ACIR, the self-help format was jettisoned to make XEL the flagship station of ACIR's La Comadre regional Mexican format, returning the format to Mexico City.

On July 31, 2021, XEL-AM changed its format to Radio La Guadalupana, affiliated with ESNE Radio and being its second station in Mexico, after XEBBB-AM in Guadalajara. It was also the second Catholic station to broadcast in the Mexico City area, after Radio María leased out XEUR-AM 1530 in December 2020. ACIR attempted to sell the station to an ESNE affiliate, an act blocked by the Federal Telecommunications Institute (IFT), which in its decision considered that the proposed controlling owner, ESNE Radio México, S.A. de C.V., acted like a religious organization and was thus barred from owning a broadcast station. After this event, ESNE Radio opted to stop operating the station on December 31, with ACIR resuming La Comadre programming on January 1, 2022.

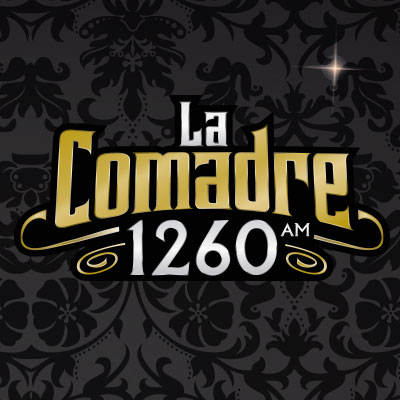
Previous La Comadre 1260 logo (from 2022 to 2026).

On May 15, 2026, XEL suddenly switched to an unbranded contemporary pop format operated by Grupo Radio Cañón, running similar programming to XEABC-AM including Radio Cañón's NTR newscasts.
