= XHPBA-FM =

Radio station in Puebla, Puebla, Mexico

Puebla, Puebla; Mexico
- Frequency: 98.7 FM
- Branding: Los 40

Programming
- Format: Pop
- Affiliations: Radiópolis

Ownership
- Owner: Tribuna Comunicación; (Radio Catedral, S.A. de C.V.)
- Sister stations: XHZT-FM

History
- First air date: September 3, 1991 (concession)
- Call sign meaning: "Puebla"

Technical information
- Class: B1
- ERP: 20 kW
- HAAT: 24.2 meters
- Transmitter coordinates: 19°03′24.4″N 98°13′46″W

Links
- Webcast: Listen live
- Website: los40puebla.com

XHPBA-FM is a radio station on 98.7 FM in Puebla, Puebla, Mexico. The station is owned by Tribuna Comunicación and carries the Los 40 national format from Radiópolis.

== History ==
XHPBA received its first concession on September 3, 1991. It was owned by María Cristina Toral García.

In September 2018, XHPBA transitioned from the Exa FM franchise, owned by MVS Radio, to Los 40, being known in the interim as "98.7 FM - Siente El Pop". The move came amid a reported family dispute threatening to tear Tribuna Comunicación apart as well as the decision by competitor Cinco Radio to sell MVS Radio a station, XHJE-FM 94.1, to which the Exa FM franchise would move as an owned-and-operated station.
