= XHYN-FM =

Radio station in Oaxaca, Oaxaca

- Oaxaca, Oaxaca; Mexico
- Frequency: 102.9 FM
- Branding: Oreja FM

Programming
- Format: Spanish adult hits

Ownership
- Owner: Grupo Radiorama; (Radiodifusora XEYN-AM, S.A. de C.V.)
- Operator: Grupo AS Comunicación
- Sister stations: XHEOA-FM, XHOQ-FM

History
- First air date: June 15, 1992 (concession)

Technical information
- ERP: 25 kW
- HAAT: -55.1 m
- Transmitter coordinates: 17°04′13″N 96°43′51″W

Links
- Webcast: Listen live
- Website: grupoasradio.com

XHYN-FM is a radio station on 102.9 FM in Oaxaca, Oaxaca, Mexico. The station is operated by Grupo AS Comunicación, a component of Grupo Radiorama, known as Oreja FM with a Spanish adult hits format.

== History ==
XEYN-AM 820 received its concession on June 15, 1992. It was cleared to move to FM in 2010.

On August 5, 2019, the station dropped the Los 40 franchise and became Estéreo Joven, retaining the pop format. On August 20, the station rebranded again as Retro 102.9.
