= XHEV-FM =

Radio station in Izúcar de Matamoros–Atlixco, Puebla, Mexico

- Izúcar, Puebla; Mexico
- Broadcast area: Atlixco, Puebla
- Frequency: 99.9 FM
- Branding: La Magnífica

Programming
- Format: Regional Mexican

Ownership
- Owner: Capital Media; (Radiodifusoras Capital, S.A. de C.V.)
- Operator: Tribuna Comunicación

History
- First air date: November 11, 1982 (concession)
- Former frequencies: 1330 kHz

Technical information
- ERP: 6 kW
- Transmitter coordinates: 18°36′45″N 98°27′46″W

Links
- Webcast: Listen live
- Website: lamagnificafm.com

XHEV-FM is a radio station on 99.9 FM in Izúcar, Puebla, licensed to Atlixco. It is owned by Capital Media and operated by Tribuna Comunicación, and carries a Regional Mexican format known as La Magnífica.

== History ==
"1330 AM Capital Máxima" logo used in the mid-2010s

XEEV-AM 1330 received its concession on November 11, 1982. It was owned by José Elías Choza Abad and broadcast with 500 watts as a daytimer. Choza Abad sold the station to Roberto Ávila Rodríguez in 1993, and in 2015, CapitalMedia bought the station.

It was authorized for its migration to FM in 2011, but promotions continued to list only 1330 AM for a number of years.

In 2017, Grupo ORO began operating the station on CapitalMedia's behalf and flipped it from Regional Mexican music to a Spanish-language adult hits format known as La Romántica, La Flor de Atlixco. With the transfer of operations, XHEV's programming began originating from studios in Atlixco.

On August 1, 2022, Grupo ORO ended operation and Capital Media resumed direct operation with Lokura FM. This, however, only lasted until March 2023, when Tribuna Comunicación, also from Puebla, assumed operational control and installed its La Magnífica brand with a Regional Mexican format.
