= XHEG-FM =

Radio station in Puebla, Puebla, Mexico

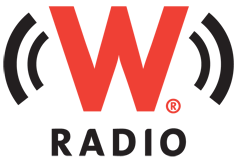
- Puebla, Puebla; Mexico
- Frequency: 92.1 MHz
- Branding: W Radio

Programming
- Format: News/talk
- Affiliations: Radiópolis

Ownership
- Owner: Grupo Radio Cañón; (Radio Cañón, S.A. de C.V.)

History
- First air date: September 21, 1970 (concession)
- Former call signs: XEEG-AM
- Former frequencies: 1280 kHz

Technical information
- ERP: 3 kW

Links
- Webcast: Listen live
- Website: grupo-rc.mx

XHEG-FM 92.1 is a radio station in Puebla, Puebla, Mexico. The station is owned by Grupo Radio Cañón and carries the W Radio news/talk format from Radiópolis.

== History ==
XEEG received its concession on November 26, 1970. It was located in Panzacola, Tlaxcala, and Ramón Bojalil y Bojalil was the concessionaire until 1980.

In the 1980s, XEEG moved to Puebla from Panzacola, which borders the Tlaxcala-Puebla state line.

On April 11, 2018, the Federal Telecommunications Institute approved the migration of XEEG to FM as XHEG-FM 92.1, but the station did not pay the migration fee. The frequency was instead awarded in April 2018 for XEPUE-AM to migrate as XHPUE-FM, which launched in August 2018. A legal dispute resulted in the IFT forcing XHPUE-FM to 104.3 MHz in 2021 to make 92.1 available for XEEG-AM to migrate; technical parameters for the FM were approved on February 4, 2022. The FM station did not begin full-time broadcasting until October 2023.

In April 2021, NTR acquired the ABC Radio network from OEM. In 2022, as with other ABC Radio stations, the station changed its name to Radio Cañón.

On April 24, 2023, as part of a national alliance between the company and Radiópolis and in preparation for its move to the FM band, XEEG-AM adopted the W Radio news/talk format.
