= XHDFM-FM =

Radio station in Mexico City

- Mexico City; Mexico
- Frequency: 106.5 MHz
- Branding: Mix

Programming
- Format: Adult hits in English

Ownership
- Owner: Grupo ACIR; (Fórmula Melódica, S. de R.L. de C.V.)

History
- First air date: 1964
- Former call signs: XHMR-FM, XHABC-FM
- Call sign meaning: DF (Distrito Federal, former administrative name of Mexico City)/ Fórmula Melódica

Technical information
- Licensing authority: CRT
- Class: C1
- ERP: 90 kW
- HAAT: −57.8 meters (−190 ft)
- Transmitter coordinates: 19°23′11.2″N 99°12′21.1″W

Links
- Webcast: XHDFM-FM
- Website: 106.5 MIX Mexico City Website

XHDFM-FM is a radio station in Mexico City. Broadcasting on 106.5 MHz, XHDFM-FM is owned by Grupo ACIR and broadcasts an adult hits format under the name 106.5 MIX. The transmitter is located atop a tower in the "Ciudad de la Radio" facility on Álvaro Obregón, west of Mexico City.

== History ==
The concession for 106.5 MHz in Mexico City was awarded in 1964 to México Radio, S.A., for XHMR-FM. Not long after, the station's callsign was changed to XHABC-FM, reflecting the station's then-common ownership with XEABC-AM 760. The station was sold to Fórmula Melódica in 1977 and the callsign changed to the current XHDFM-FM. Fórmula Melódica, owned by the Guadalajara-based Ondas de Alegría group, broadcast romantic and ranchera music in Spanish until 1981, when it became "La Nueva Onda" and changed its format to ballad music. The station moved studios in 1985 after its previous facilities were heavily damaged by the 1985 Mexico City earthquake.

In 1986, Ondas de Alegría was dissolved and Grupo ARTSA took over operation. The station's name was changed again, to "Stereo Amor", and then in 1992 to "Amor 106", both times with a romantic music format. In 1995, XHDFM and its sisters were sold to Grupo ACIR, who changed the station to its current name and format, which had been created a year earlier on XHSH-FM.
