= XEPOP-AM =

Radio station in Puebla, Puebla

- San Jose Xilotzingo, Puebla; Mexico
- Broadcast area: Puebla, Puebla
- Frequency: 1120 kHz
- Branding: Red Ciudadana

Programming
- Format: News

Ownership
- Owner: Cincoradio; (X.E.P.O.P., S.A. de C.V.)
- Sister stations: XEHR-AM, XHNP-FM XHPUE-FM

History
- First air date: April 4, 1974
- Former frequencies: 1490 kHz

Technical information
- Class: B
- Power: 5,000 watts daytime 100 watts nighttime
- Transmitter coordinates: 18°58′51.4″N 98°12′10.4″W

Links
- Webcast: Listen live
- Website: redciudadana.mx

XEPOP-AM is a radio station in Puebla, Puebla, in Mexico. It broadcasts Red Ciudadana on 1120 kHz and is owned by Cincoradio.

== History ==
Logo as Radio Fórmula, used until 2026

XEPOP received its concession on April 4, 1974. It was owned by Sergio Fajardo Ortiz and broadcast on 1490 kHz. XEPOP was sold to XEPOP, S.A., in 1988.

Joint ownership in the concessionaire is held by María Elvira del Coral Castillo Zepeda and Pablo Cañedo Castillo.
