= XHRH-FM =

Radio station in Puebla, Puebla

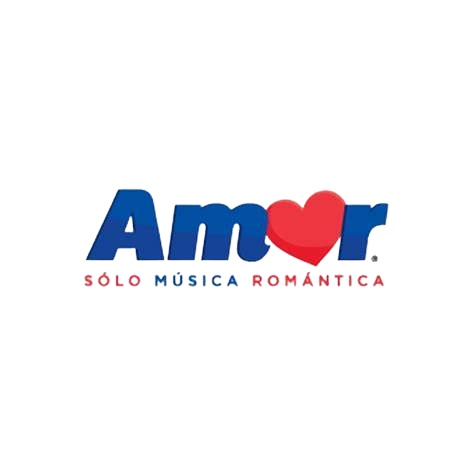
- Puebla, Puebla, Mexico; Mexico
- Broadcast area: Puebla, Puebla
- Frequency: 103.3 FM
- Branding: Amor

Programming
- Format: Romantic

Ownership
- Owner: Grupo ACIR; (Radio XHRH-FM, S.A. de C.V.)

History
- First air date: February 12, 1976 (concession)
- Call sign meaning: Roberto H. López Hernández

Technical information
- Class: B
- ERP: 50 kW
- HAAT: 63.52 meters (208.4 ft)
- Transmitter coordinates: 19°02′36.3″N 98°12′43.14″W

Links
- Webcast: XHRH-FM
- Website: www.iheart.com/live/amor-1033-6572/

XHRH-FM is a radio station on 103.3 FM in Puebla, Puebla in Mexico. The station is owned by Grupo ACIR and carries its Amor romantic music format.

== History ==
XHRH received its first concession on February 12, 1976. It was owned by Roberto H. López Hernández and originally operated on 93.3 MHz.
