= Radio Disney Latin America =

Radio network

Radio Disney
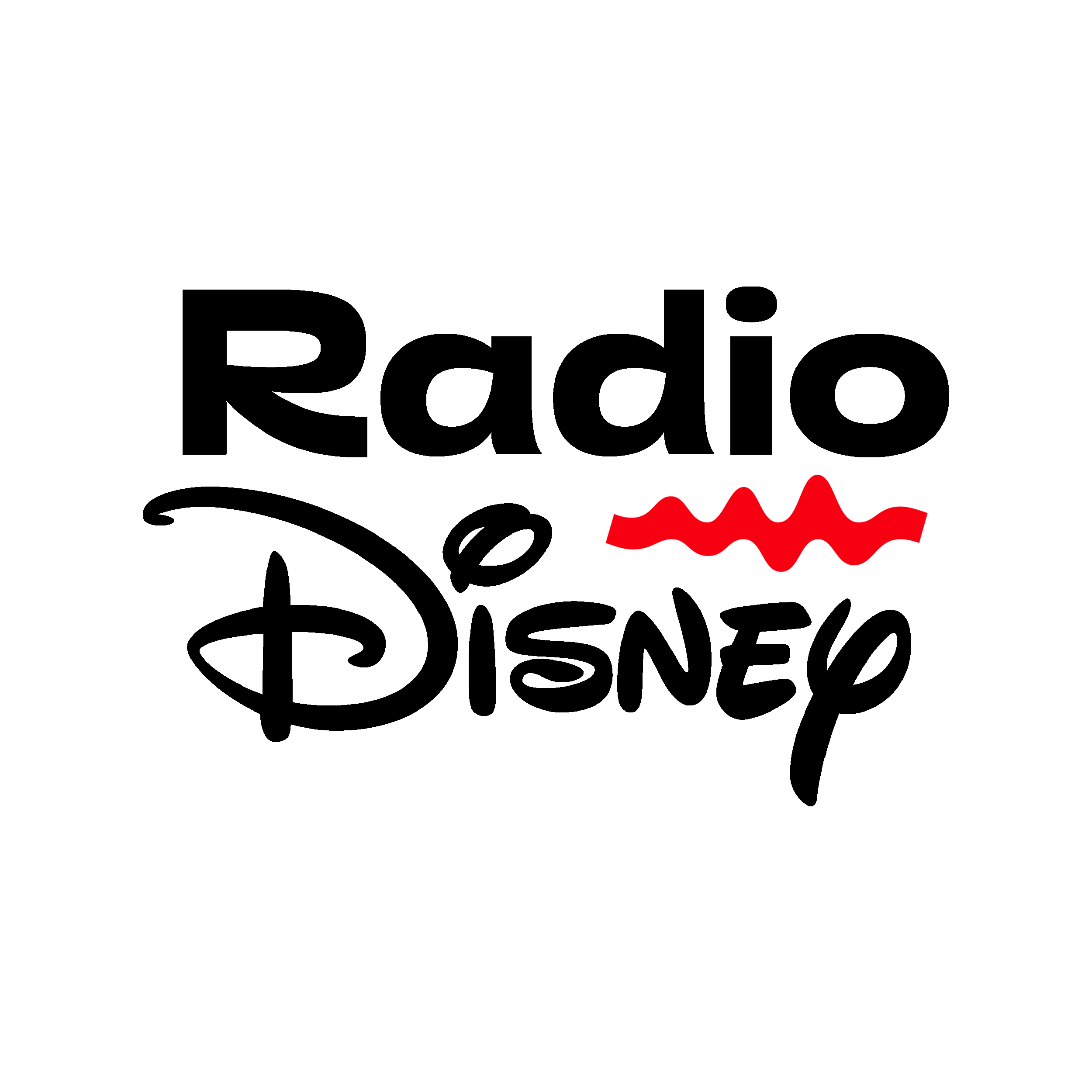
- Type: Radio network

Ownership
- Owner: The Walt Disney Company Latin America

History
- Launch date: 2001 (Radio Disney Argentina)

Coverage
- Availability: International (except Colombia, Cuba, El Salvador, & Venezuela)
- Affiliates: See list

Links
- Website: radiodisney.com

Radio Disney Latin America is a pop music and rock music network owned by The Walt Disney Company, which is broadcast in several countries in Latin America. The station is aimed primarily at youth and adolescents.

== Availability ==
Radio Disney is available in Argentina, Bolivia, Brazil, Chile, Costa Rica, Dominican Republic, Ecuador, Mexico, Panama, Paraguay, Peru and Uruguay.

=== 2019 Mexico breakup ===
On December 26, 2019, Disney and its Mexican partner, Grupo ACIR, announced they were mutually ending their relationship, which had covered twelve Mexican cities. Ten of the twelve Radio Disney stations were transitioned to ACIR's replacement pop format, Match.

However, Radio Disney stated in a press release that it would return on new stations in 2020. One article attributed the breakup to "three direct format competitors and an impressive surge in Spotify consumption in key market Mexico City.". Radio Disney returned to the country on February 1, 2020, exclusively on Mexico City station XHFO-FM.

== Stations ==
Frequency	country	Location	HD Radio
94.3	Argentina	Buenos Aires	✓
96.5	Paraguay	San Lorenzo	✓
97.3	Dominican Republic	Santo Domingo	✓
101.1	Costa Rica	San José	✓
93.7	Ecuador	Guayaquil	✓
93.7	Ecuador	Santa Elena	✓
98.3	Ecuador	Cuenca	✓
95.3	Chile	Santiago	✓
101.3	Panama	Panama City	✓
91.3	Brazil	São Paulo	✓
103.7	Uruguay	Montevideo,	✓
102.5	Bolivia	La Paz,	✓
98.7	Bolivia	Santa Cruz	✓
107.5	Bolivia	Cochabamba	✗
104.7	Peru	Lima	✓
92.1	Mexico	Mexico City	✓
102.1	Mexico	Toluca,	✗
95.7	Mexico	Pachuca	✗
92.9	Mexico	Puebla	✓
93.1	Mexico	Mazatlán	✗

== Slogans ==
- "Aquí está tu música" (former) ("Here is your music")
- "Escucha eso que quieres sentir" (2008–2023) ("Hear what you wanna feel")
- "A rádio que te Ouve" (Brazil) (2010–2023) ("The radio that listens to you")
- "La radio que te escucha" (Mexico) (2013–2019; 2020-2023) ("The radio that listens to you")
- "Te llega" (2023–present)
- "La música te llega" (2023–present)

== Notes ==
- Radio Disney Bolivia is a joint venture between The Walt Disney Company Latin America and Empresa de Comunicaciones del Oriente

== See also ==
- Disney Channel Latin America
- Radio Disney
