= List of radio stations in Yucatán =

This is a list of radio stations in the Mexican state of Yucatán, which can be sorted by their call signs, frequencies, location, ownership, names, and programming formats.

Radio stations in Yucatán
Call sign	Frequency	Location	Owner	Name	Format
XEUM-AM (Note: Linked to XHUM-FM, which must keep XEUM-AM on the air until there are no listeners in its service area unserved by other radio stations.)	610 AM	Valladolid	Medios Electrónicos de Valladolid, S.A. de C.V.	Candela	Regional Mexican
XEVG-AM (Note: Combo with XHVG-FM 94.5)	650 AM	Mérida	Transmisora Regional Radio Fórmula, S.A. de C.V.	Radio Fórmula	News/talk
XEPET-AM (Note: Linked to XHPET-FM, which must keep XEPET-AM on the air until there are no listeners in its service area unserved by other radio stations.)	730 AM	Peto	Instituto Nacional de los Pueblos Indígenas	La Voz de los Mayas	Indigenous
XHPTUN-FM	88.1 FM	Tunkás	Empresa Turquesa, S.A. de C.V.	Radio Turquesa	Regional Mexican
XHRRF-FM	88.5 FM	Conkal	Estudios Multimedia del Mayab Uno, S.A. de C.V.	Arya FM	English adult contemporary
XHCCCU-FM	88.9 FM	Mérida	Mediasur, S.A. de C.V.	Telesur Radio	
XHMIA-FM	89.3 FM	Mérida	Multimedia del Sureste, S.A. de C.V.	Radio Mundo	Adult contemporary
XHQW-FM	90.1 FM	Mérida	Stereorey México, S.A.	La Mejor	Regional Mexican
XHMQM-FM	90.9 FM	Mérida	Radio Mayab, S.A.	Ke Buena	Regional Mexican
XHCCCW-FM	91.1 FM	Valladolid	Corpulenta Operadora, S.A. de C.V.	Presumida	Contemporary hit radio
XHMET-FM	91.9 FM	Temozón	Radio Valladolid, S.A. de C.V.	La Reverenda del Oriente	Regional Mexican
XHMYL-FM	92.1 FM	Mérida	Radio Mil del Sur, S.A. de C.V.	MYL FM 92.1	Contemporary hit radio
XHCSIZ-FM	92.5 FM	Mérida	Instituto para la Protección del Medio Natural, A.C.	—N/a	—N/a
XHUM-FM	92.7 FM	Valladolid	Medios Electrónicos de Valladolid, S.A. de C.V.	Candela	Regional Mexican
XHYUC-FM	92.9 FM	Mérida	Instituto Mexicano de la Radio	Yucatán FM	Public radio
XHCCCS-FM	93.3 FM	Celestún	Tuukul Systems, S.A. de C.V.	Kuxtal FM	Full-service
XHMRI-FM	93.7 FM	Mérida	Super Estéreo Peninsular, S.A. de C.V.	La Reverenda	Regional Mexican
XHCCCT-FM	94.1 FM	Mérida	Imagen Radio Comercial, S.A. de C.V.	Imagen Radio	News/talk
XHVG-FM	94.5 FM	Mérida	Transmisora Regional Radio Fórmula, S.A. de C.V.	Radio Fórmula 1° Cadena	News/talk
XHMIN-FM	94.5 FM	Tizimín	Universidad Autónoma de Yucatán	Radio Universidad	University
XHPCEL-FM	94.9 FM	Celestún	Pantalla Líquida, S.A. de C.V.	—N/a	—N/a
XHMH-FM	95.3 FM	Mérida	Radio Mérida, S.A.	Candela	Regional Mexican
XHCSAL-FM	95.9 FM	Valladolid	Radio Tonatiuh, A.C.	—N/a	—N/a
XHUP-FM	96.3 FM	Tizimín	La Voz del Caribe, S.A.	Candela	Regional Mexican
XHUL-FM	96.9 FM	Mérida	Radio Progreso de Yucatán, S.A. de C.V.	Los 40	Contemporary hit radio
XHPETO-FM	97.3 FM	Peto	Pantalla Líquida, S.A. de C.V.	—N/a	—N/a
XHGL-FM	97.7 FM	Mérida	Stereo Maya, S.A. de C.V.	Kiss FM	Contemporary hit radio
XHCCCV-FM	97.9 FM	Tizimín	Mediasur, S.A. de C.V.	—N/a	—N/a
XHCSCN-FM	98.3 FM	Valladolid	Rode Abigail Poot Caballero	Sendero	Spanish classic hits
XHMT-FM	98.5 FM	Mérida	SIPSE, S.A. de C.V.	La Comadre	Regional Mexican
XHYW-FM	98.9 FM	San Pedro Nohpat, Mérida	Impulsora de Radio del Sureste, S.A.	Radio Mexicana	Regional Mexican
XHMRA-FM	99.3 FM	Mérida	Stereorey México, S.A.	Exa FM	Contemporary hit radio
XHPYUC-FM	99.7 FM	Peto	Centrado Corporativo, S.A. de C.V.	Arre en Acustik	Regional Mexican
XHYU-FM	100.1 FM	Mérida	SIPSE, S.A. de C.V.	Amor	Romantic
XHPMAX-FM	100.5 FM	Temax	Empresa Turquesa, S.A. de C.V.	Radio Turquesa	Regional Mexican
XHYK-FM	101.5 FM	Conkal	Estudios Multimedia del Mayab Uno, S.A. de C.V.	Xé'ek	Adult hits
XHCSAG-FM	101.9 FM	Mérida	La Visión de Dios, A.C.	Vida Nueva	Christian
XHPYM-FM	103.1 FM	Mérida	La Voz del Mayab, S.A.	Retro FM 103.1	Adult contemporary
XHRUY-FM	103.9 FM	Mérida	Universidad Autónoma de Yucatán	Radio Universidad	University
XHPTEM-FM	104.3 FM	Temax	Pantalla Líquida, S.A. de C.V.	Super Zona	Variety
XHZ-FM	105.1 FM	Mérida	Transmisora Regional Radio Fórmula, S.A. de C.V.	Radio Fórmula 2° Cadena	News/talk
XHPET-FM	105.5 FM	Peto	Instituto Nacional de los Pueblos Indígenas	La Voz de los Mayas	Indigenous
XHFCY-FM	105.9 FM	Mérida	La Voz en Yucatán del Radio, S.A.	Super Stereo	Adult contemporary
XHYRE-FM	107.9 FM	Mérida	Secretaría de Cultura	Radio Educación Señal Kukulkán	Cultural

== Defunct stations ==
- XHPKAS-FM 93.3 Tunkás
- XHIPM-FM 102.3 Mérida
