= XHY-TDT =

TV station in Mérida, Yucatán, Mexico

- Mérida, Yucatán; Mexico
- Channels: Digital: 25 (UHF); Virtual: 8/6
- Branding: SIPSE Televisión

Programming
- Subchannels: 8.1 SIPSE Televisión; 6.1 Multimedios Televisión

Ownership
- Owner: Grupo SIPSE; (Televisora de Yucatán, S.A. de C.V.)
- Sister stations: XHGL-FM, XHMT-FM, XHYU-FM; XHCCU-TDT

History
- Founded: January 31, 1963
- Last air date: December 31, 2021
- Former call signs: XHY-TV (1963–2016)
- Former channel numbers: 3 (until 1994); 2 (1994-2016); 9 (virtual, 2016–2021)
- Call sign meaning: Y for Yucatán

Technical information
- ERP: 122.64 kW
- Transmitter coordinates: 20°58′40″N 89°37′17″W

Links
- Website: SIPSE.com

XHY-TDT was a television station in Mérida, Yucatán, Mexico. The station was an independent known as SIPSE Televisión and owned by Grupo SIPSE.

== History ==
XHY received its concession on January 29, 1963, and came to air just two days later. Broadcasting on channel 3, XHY was southeastern Mexico's first television station, jointly owned by Emilio Azcárraga Vidaurreta of Telesistema Mexicano and Andrés García Lavín, the owner of SIPSE.

In 1994, XHY moved from channel 3 to channel 2 in order to allow Televisa to add a station in Mérida, XHMEN-TV with the Canal 5 network. It moved to virtual channel 9 as a result of the virtual channel standardization of 2016 and then to channel 8 in 2021, switching with the Nu9ve subchannel of XHMEN-TDT.

Between December 2013 and January 2017, XHY branded as Gala TV Mérida. It returned to branding as SIPSE Televisión at the start of February 2017.
