= 1120 AM =

AM radio frequency

The following radio stations broadcast on AM frequency 1120 kHz: 1120 AM is a United States clear-channel frequency. KMOX in St. Louis, Missouri, is the dominant station on 1120 AM.

== In Argentina ==
- LV5 Sarmiento in San Juan
- Sudamericana in San Andrés
- Tango in CABA

== In Mexico ==
- XEMX-AM in Mexicali, Baja California
- XEPOP-AM in San José Zilotzingo, Puebla
- XERUY-AM in Mérida, Yucatán
- XETQE-AM in Tenosique, Tabasco
- XEUNO-AM in Guadalajara, Jalisco

== In the United States ==
Stations in bold are clear-channel stations.

| Call sign | City of license | Facility ID | Class | Daytime power (kW) | Nighttime power (kW) | Critical hours power (kW) | Unlimited power (kW) | Transmitter coordinates |
|---|---|---|---|---|---|---|---|---|
| KANN | Roy, Utah | 20509 | B | 10 | 1.1 | | | 41.058611°N 112.069444°W |
| WPRX | Bristol, Connecticut | 13630 | B | 1 | 0.5 | | | |
| KCRN | Limon, Colorado | 25185 | D | 50 | | | | 39.274444°N 104.161667°W |
| KETU | Catoosa, Oklahoma | 3651 | D | 10 | | 7 | | 36.306944°N 95.972778°W |
| **KMOX** | St. Louis, Missouri | 9638 | A | 50 | 50 | | | 38.7225°N 90.055°W |
| KPNW | Eugene, Oregon | 40846 | B | | | | 50 | 43.956667°N 123.036111°W |
| KTXW | Manor, Texas | 160615 | B | 5.6 | 0.155 | | | 30.331111°N 97.506944°W |
| KZSJ | San Martin, California | 30906 | D | 5 | 0.15 | | | 36.963611°N 121.489444°W |
| WBBF | Buffalo, New York | 53967 | D | 1 | | | | 42.830556°N 78.800278°W |
| WBNW | Concord, Massachusetts | 3013 | B | 5 | 1 | | | 42.448333°N 71.4275°W |
| WHOG | Hobson City, Alabama | 27434 | D | 0.5 | | | | 33.613889°N 85.855278°W |
| WKAJ | Saint Johnsville, New York | 160470 | B | 10 | 0.4 | | | 42.999722°N 74.691667°W |
| WKQW | Oil City, Pennsylvania | 63290 | D | 1 | | | | 41.395833°N 79.664722°W |
| WMSW | Hatillo, Puerto Rico | 3257 | B | 2.6 | 0.4 | | | 18.470278°N 66.840556°W |
| WSME | Camp Lejeune, North Carolina | 73687 | D | 6 | | 4.2 | | 34.7175°N 77.2825°W |
| WTLT | Maryville, Tennessee | 17472 | D | 1 | | | | 35.842222°N 83.7725°W |
| WTWZ | Clinton, Mississippi | 73601 | D | 10 | | 2.5 | | 32.350833°N 90.339444°W |
| WUST | Washington, District of Columbia | 48686 | D | 50 | | 3 | | 38.869167°N 76.896389°W |
| WXJO | Douglasville, Georgia | 25386 | D | 1 | | | | 33.763333°N 84.741111°W |
