= WNIK =

WNIK can refer to:

- WNIK (AM), a radio station (1230 AM) licensed to Arecibo, Puerto Rico
- WNIK-FM, a radio station (106.5 FM) licensed to Arecibo, Puerto Rico
