= WHOG =

WHOG could refer to:

- WHOG (AM), a radio station (1120 AM) licensed to Hobson City, Alabama, United States
- WHOG-FM, a radio station (95.7 FM) licensed to Ormond-By-The-Sea, Florida, United States
