= XHPKAS-FM =

Radio station in Tunkás, Yucatán

Tunkás, Yucatán; Mexico
- Frequency: 93.3 FM (HD Radio)
- Branding: Ki'in Radio

Ownership
- Owner: Debate por Yucatán, S.A. de C.V.

History
- First air date: 2018
- Last air date: November 22, 2019 (concession surrender)
- Call sign meaning: TunKÁS

Technical information
- Class: A
- ERP: 3 kW
- HAAT: 26.9 m
- Transmitter coordinates: 20°54′14″N 88°44′44″W

Links
- Website: debateporyucatan.com

XHPKAS-FM was a radio station on 93.3 FM in Tunkás, Yucatán, in Mexico, which was known as Ki'in Radio.

== History ==
XHPKAS was awarded in the IFT-4 radio auction of 2017 to Debate por Yucatán, an independent news site, and was the cheapest station purchased at auction with a final bid of just 5,000 pesos. The station operated from 2018 to 2019. On November 22, 2019, Russell Arjona Tamayo, the owner of Debate por Yucatán, surrendered the concession, noting that he had developed glaucoma and his eyesight was severely impaired, requiring him to seek medical attention and preventing him from operating the station.
