= XHMRI-FM =

Radio station in Mérida, Yucatán, Mexico

- Mérida, Yucatán; Mexico
- Frequency: 93.7 MHz
- Branding: La Reverenda

Programming
- Format: Regional Mexican

Ownership
- Owner: Corporativo Rivas; (La Reverenda en Frecuencia Modulada, S. de R.L. de C.V.)
- Sister stations: XHMYL-FM, XHMET-FM (Valladolid)

History
- First air date: July 23, 1991 (concession)
- Call sign meaning: "Mérida"

Technical information
- ERP: 100 kW

Links
- Webcast: XHMRI-FM
- Website: www.lareverenda.mx

XHMRI-FM is a radio station in Mérida, Yucatán. Broadcasting on 93.7 FM, XHMRI is owned by Corporativo Rivas and carries a Regional Mexican format known as La Reverenda.

It is simulcast in eastern Yucatán on XHMET-FM 91.9 in Temozón as "La Nueva Reverenda".

== History ==
The station's concession was awarded in 1991. It has always been owned by the Rivas family. The station was originally known as Super Stereo 93.7. In 2005, the station adopted the Ke Buena national Regional Mexican format from Televisa Radio. In 2015, Televisa Radio started a new affiliation agreement with Cadena RASA, with Ke Buena being moved to XHMQM-FM 90.9; XHMRI was relaunched as "La Reverenda".
