= Ukit Kan Lek Tokʼ =

8th-century Mayan king

Ukit Kan Lek Tokʼ (or possibly Ukit Kanle'k Tok') was an ancient Maya ajaw or king of the city of Ek' Balam in the Yucatán Peninsula from May 26, 770 AD until some time after 797 AD.

== Titles ==
His name may mean "the father of the four hard flints." Ukit Kan Lek Tok' was the Holy Lord of Talol, a dynastic title associated with rulers of the region. He uses the phrase Kalo’mte’, a title associated with some of the highest-ranking royalty in the Maya world, especially Calakmul. He also uses the title Ch'ak Ohl Ba'te', "Warrior who cuts out hearts," and Pitziil, or "ballplayer."

== Reign ==
Ek' Balam seems to have flourished under his reign, and much of the visible architecture at the site today was built by him or in his honor, including the well-known Structure 1 which includes some of the best-preserved plaster sculptures in Yucatán.

Although by the late 700s, the political structure of the Classic Era of Maya culture had begun to collapse in places like Tikal and Calakmul, Ukit Kan Lek Tok' seems to have been one of a small number of Maya leaders who not only helped their cities survive but thrive during the collapse. His kingship was important enough to be memorialized on at least four occasions after his death, and every known king after him mentioned him.
