= XHUL-FM =

Radio station in Mérida, Yucatán, Mexico

Mérida, Yucatán; Mexico
- Frequency: 96.9 MHz
- Branding: Los 40

Programming
- Format: Contemporary hit radio
- Affiliations: Radiópolis

Ownership
- Owner: Cadena RASA; (Radio Progreso de Yucatán, S.A. de C.V.)
- Sister stations: XHMH-FM, XHMQM-FM, XHPYM-FM

History
- First air date: August 31, 1971 (concession)
- Former call signs: XEUL-AM
- Former frequencies: 1360 kHz, 930 kHz

Technical information
- ERP: 25 kW
- Transmitter coordinates: 20°58′30″N 89°37′20″W

Links
- Website: cadenarasa.com

XHUL-FM is a radio station on 96.9 FM in Mérida, Yucatan, Mexico. It is owned by Cadena RASA and carries the Los 40 format from Radiópolis.

== History ==
XEUL-AM 1360 received its concession on August 31, 1971. It broadcast with 500 watts from Progreso, Yucatán, and was owned by Ester Ávila Alonso. It moved to 930 in Mérida, with 2.5 kW day, in the 1990s and was sold to Radio Progreso de Yucatán in 1997. The station was known as "Radio Barracua" and became a grupera as La Picosita in early 2000s.

It migrated to FM after being authorized to move in 2010 and its call sign was changed to XHUL-FM. During the AM-FM migration it became "Átomo 96.9", which lasted until June 1, 2015, when it became the Los 40 station in Mérida; the format had broadcast on XHMYL-FM since 2005.

On January 1, 2023, Cadena RASA moved the Los 40 format and on-air staff from XHUL-FM 96.9 to XHPYM-FM 103.1 and leased XHUL-FM to El Heraldo Radio. The Heraldo programming was dropped on November 29, 2024 and the Los 40 returned to the 96.9 frequency on January 1, 2025.
