= XHCCU-TDT =

TV station in Cancún, Quintana Roo, Mexico

- Cancún, Quintana Roo; Mexico
- Channels: Digital: 36 (UHF); Virtual: 8
- Branding: SIPSE TVCUN

Ownership
- Owner: Grupo SIPSE; (Televisora de Cancún, S.A. de C.V.)
- Sister stations: XHY-TDT

History
- Founded: 1992
- Last air date: December 31, 2021
- Former channel number: Digital: 39 (UHF) (to October 2018)
- Call sign meaning: "Cancún"

Technical information
- Licensing authority: CRT
- ERP: 86.24 kW
- Transmitter coordinates: 21°09′13″N 86°49′41″W

Links
- Website: SIPSE TVCUN

XHCCU-TDT was a television station in Cancún, Quintana Roo. Broadcasting on virtual channel 8 from a studio and transmitter facility located in central Cancún, XHCCU is owned by Grupo SIPSE and is known as SIPSE TVCUN.

== History ==
The station's concession was awarded to SIPSE in 1991 and its concession took effect in July 1992.

Between December 2013 and January 2017, XHCCU branded as Gala TV Cancún. It returned to branding as SIPSE TVCUN at the start of February 2017.

In October 2018, XHCCU moved from channel 39 to 36 in order to facilitate the repacking of TV services out of the 600 MHz band (channels 38-51).

== Repeater ==
XHCCU has one repeater in digital, at Playa del Carmen, broadcasting at 20 kW.
