= Peto Municipality =

Municipality in the Mexican state of Yucatán

Peto Pet Uj (Yucatec Maya)
- Municipality
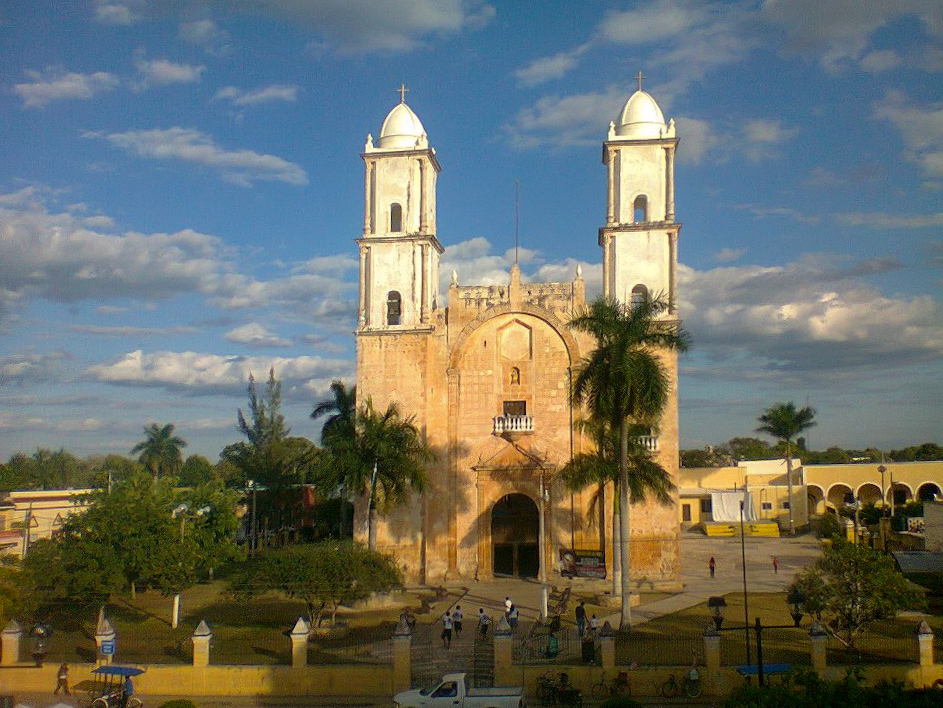

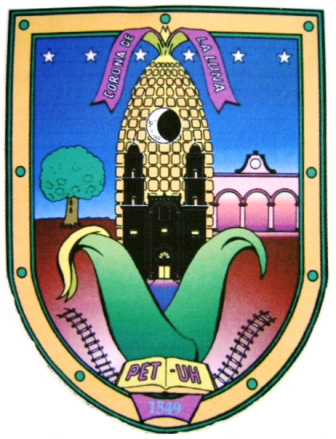
- Coat of arms

- Location of Peto in Yucatán

- Location within Mexico
- Coordinates: 20°07′N 89°55′W
- Country: Mexico
- State: Yucatán

Government
  - Type: Morena 2024-2027
  - Municipal President: Emerio Calderón Góngora

Area
  - Total: 3,136 km^{2} (1,211 sq mi)
- Elevation: 35 m (115 ft)

Population (2005)
  - Total: 22,386
- Time zone: UTC-6 (Central Standard Time)
- INEGI Code: 058
- Major Airport: Merida (Manuel Crescencio Rejón) International Airport
- IATA Code: MID
- ICAO Code: MMMD

Peto Municipality is a municipality in the Mexican state of Yucatán. It has a municipal seat of the same name and is located in the centre-south portion of the Yucatán, 135 km to the south-east of state capital Mérida.

== Communities ==
The municipality is made up of 74 communities, the most important include the following:

- Peto (Municipal Seat)
- Xoy
- Yaxcopil
- Tixhualatun
- Progresito

== Maya sites ==
Inside the municipality some ancient maya sites are located, including Witzinah, Tixualahtún and Xoy.

== Additional Data ==
City population (2005): 18,177
City Founded: 1549
Annual fairs: 29 April to 3 May; 26 December to 2 January
Media: XEPET-AM, a government-run indigenous community radio station.
