= WPRX =

- Bristol, Connecticut; United States
- Broadcast area: Greater Hartford
- Frequency: 1120 kHz
- Branding: Dinámica 1120 AM

Programming
- Language: Spanish
- Format: Tropical music

Ownership
- Owner: Nievezquez Productions, Inc.

History
- First air date: October 1948; 77 years ago
- Former call signs: WBIS (1948–1993)
- Call sign meaning: "Puerto Rican Extraordinaire"

Technical information
- Licensing authority: FCC
- Facility ID: 13630
- Class: B
- Power: 1,000 watts day; 500 watts night
- Transmitter coordinates: 41°39′29.35″N 72°56′49.37″W

Links
- Public license information: Public file; LMS
- Website: dinamicaam.com

WPRX (1120 AM) is a radio station licensed to serve Bristol, Connecticut. The station is owned by Nievezquez Productions, Inc. It airs a tropical music format.

By day, WPRX is powered by 1,000 watts. As 1120 AM is a clear channel frequency reserved for Class A station KMOX St. Louis. WPRX reduces power at night to 500 watts to avoid interference. It uses a directional antenna with a two-tower array. The transmitter is on off of Sherbrook St in Bristol Connecticut.

WPRX is the first wholly owned Puerto Rican station in the United States and airs music from the Caribbean, Central America, South America and Spain, as well as news direct from Puerto Rico. The station features nearly 100 percent local programming.

== History ==
In 1977, the station, then WBIS, was purchased by David Rodgers, who owned stations in Salinas, California. Rodgers purchased the station from Robert Baker who had previously been the general sales manager at KDKA-TV in Pittsburgh. Rogers hired John Hiatt, a broadcaster from El Paso, Texas, to run the radio station, and Rodgers owned the station for nearly a decade before selling the property. At that time, WBIS programmed a soft rock format and was located on 1440 kHz and was on the air only during the day.

In 1993 the station was assigned the call letters WPRX by the Federal Communications Commission (FCC). In September 2010, the FCC canceled WPRX's license because its license had expired without renewal on April 1, 2006; after filing a renewal application, the station was fined $7,000 in August 2011. WPRX's license was again canceled on June 7, 2017, for not paying debts it owed to the FCC, which prevented the renewal of the station's license; the license was reinstated on November 15, 2017. Its license was cancelled again on April 4, 2022, for failing to file a license renewal application; a month later, the WPRX license was restored after the application was filed.
