= XHMET-FM =

Radio station in Temozón, Yucatán, Mexico

Simulcast of XHMRI-FM on Mérida
- Temozón, Yucatán; Mexico
- Broadcast area: Valladolid, Yucatán
- Frequency: 91.9 MHz
- Branding: La Nueva Reverenda

Programming
- Format: Regional Mexican

Ownership
- Owner: Corporativo Rivas; (Radio Valladolid, S.A. de C.V.)
- Sister stations: XHMYL-FM (Mérida), XHMRI-FM (Mérida)

History
- First air date: December 30, 1972 (concession)
- Call sign meaning: Manuel; Escoffie; Temozón (fifth letter added during AM-FM migration)

Technical information
- ERP: 25 kW
- Transmitter coordinates: 20°47′03″N 88°12′15″W

Links
- Website: corporativorivas.com// corporativorivas.com/XHMET-FM www.lareverenda.mx/la-reverenda-oriente

XHMET-FM is a radio station in Temozón, Yucatán, licensed to Valladolid. Broadcasting on 91.9 FM, XHMET is owned by Corporativo Rivas and carries a Regional Mexican format known as La Nueva Reverenda.

== History ==
XHMET began as XEME-AM 1490, with a concession awarded in 1972 to Manuel Rodríguez Escoffie. The original concession specified Valladolid as the location of the new AM station. The station was later moved to 570 kHz as a daytimer, operating with 2.5 kilowatts of power.

In 2006, the station moved its transmitter to Temozón, nine miles (14 km) further down the Valladolid-Tizimín highway. In 2010, it received authorization to migrate to FM. As there was already an XHME-FM in Puerto Vallarta, Jalisco, the station became XHMET-FM 91.9. From 2012 to 2015, the station was a franchise of the La Mejor Regional Mexican format from MVS Radio.

In 2015, the station became known as La Reverenda del Oriente, a regional version of the format and name on XHMRI-FM 93.7 in Mérida. This ended on May 22, 2024, when Corporativo Rivas abruptly shut down the local operation and locked out all employees. The station changed programming that day and rebranded temporarily as "La 91.9 de Valladolid". Some time later, La Reverenda resumed its format.
