= XEUNO-AM =

Radio station in Guadalajara, Jalisco, Mexico

- Guadalajara, Jalisco; Mexico
- Frequency: 1120 AM
- Branding: Acustik Radio

Programming
- Format: Regional Mexican

Ownership
- Owner: Grupo Acustik; (Emisora 1150, S.A. de C.V.)

History
- First air date: February 11, 1963 (concession)
- Call sign meaning: "Uno", Spanish for "one"

Technical information
- Licensing authority: CRT
- Class: C
- Power: 500 watts
- Transmitter coordinates: 20°40′21.6″N 103°20′53.0″W

Links
- Website: acustik.mx

XEUNO-AM is a radio station on 1120 AM in Guadalajara, Jalisco. It is owned by Grupo Acustik and carries a Regional Mexican format known as Acustik Radio.

== History ==
XEVMC-AM received its concession on February 11, 1963. It was owned by and named for Víctor Manuel Chávez y Chávez. In 1967, Chávez y Chávez sold to Radio Difusora de Jalisco, S.A., and the station was rechristened XEUNO-AM.

In 1984, Difusora Central de México bought XEUNO. PRAM, initially a concessionaire for Radiorama, acquired the station in 1992. Around that time, the station aired an English-language classic hits format known as "Universal", then heard in Mexico City on XEQR-FM.

In 2015, Organización PRAM was replaced by Radio Emisora XHSP-FM as the concessionaire as part of a restructuring of the stations then owned by Grupo Radio México. GRM merged with corporate cousin Grupo Radio Centro in 2016.

On September 2, 2019, Radio 1 changed to Acustik Radio with a Regional Mexican format. That same day, Acustik began programming two other former Radio Centro AM stations, XEJP-AM in Mexico City and XEMN-AM in Monterrey, Nuevo León.
