= Witzinah =

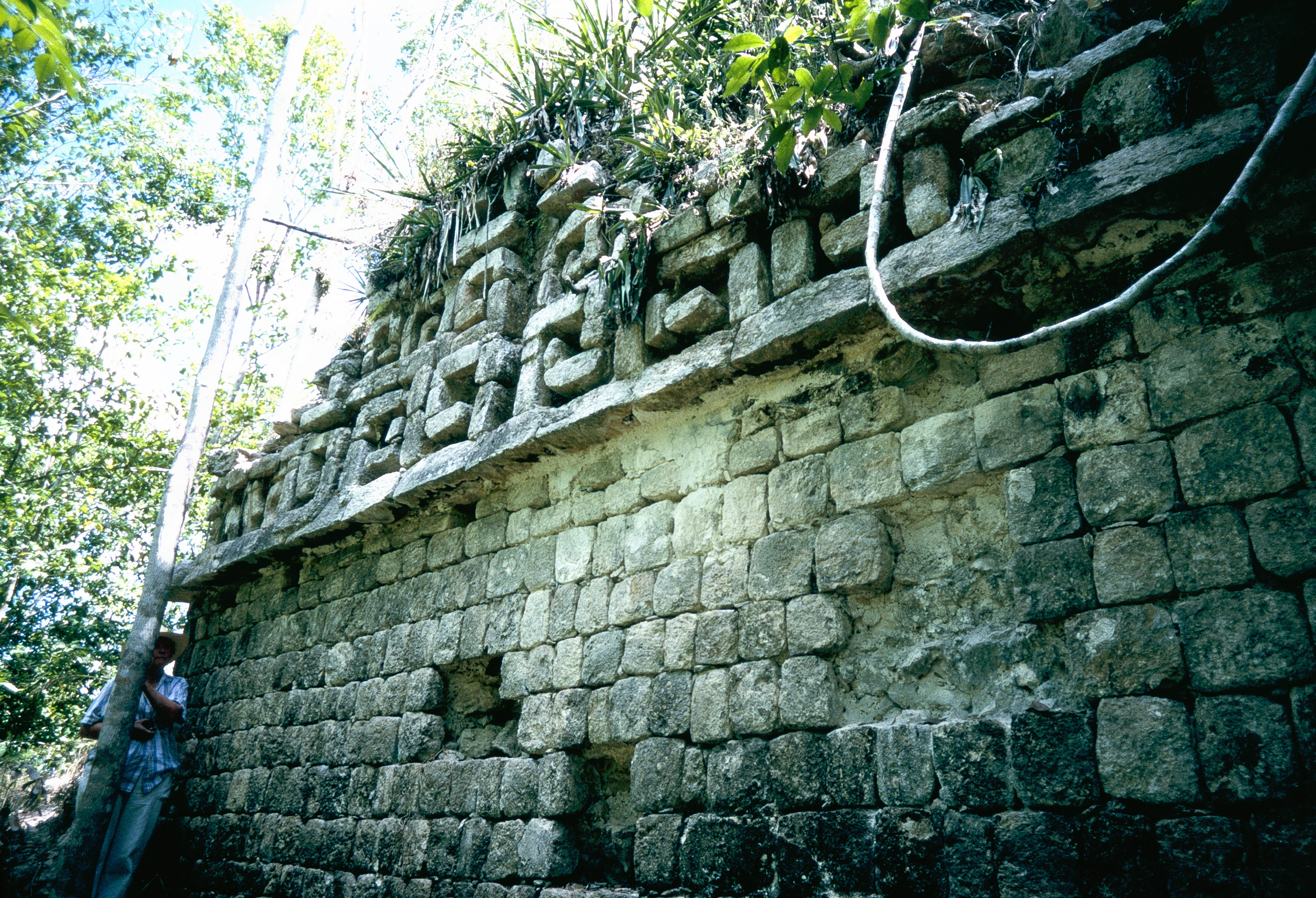

- Location within Mexico Location within Yucatán (state)
- Type: Ancient Maya city
- Periods: Classic
- Cultures: Maya civilization
- Location: Mexico
- Region: Chenes

Site notes
- Architectural style: Chenes

Witzinah (also known as Uitziná) is an ancient archaeological Maya site located in the municipality of Peto in the southern cone of Yucatán, Mexico. Witzinah belongs to the Chenes region, its main development began during the classic period of the Maya civilization and it had its peak during the late classic.

== Architecture ==
Witzinah contains more than 50 ceremonial and residential structures distributed around large plazas and patios. The architectural style of the buildings of Witzinah belongs to the architectural style of the Chenes region, although some elements of the Río Bec style have also been identified in the structures. In the core of the site is located the main building which is a large pyramid structure that reaches a height of 14 meters finely decorated with a Chenes style frieze representing geometrical patterns.

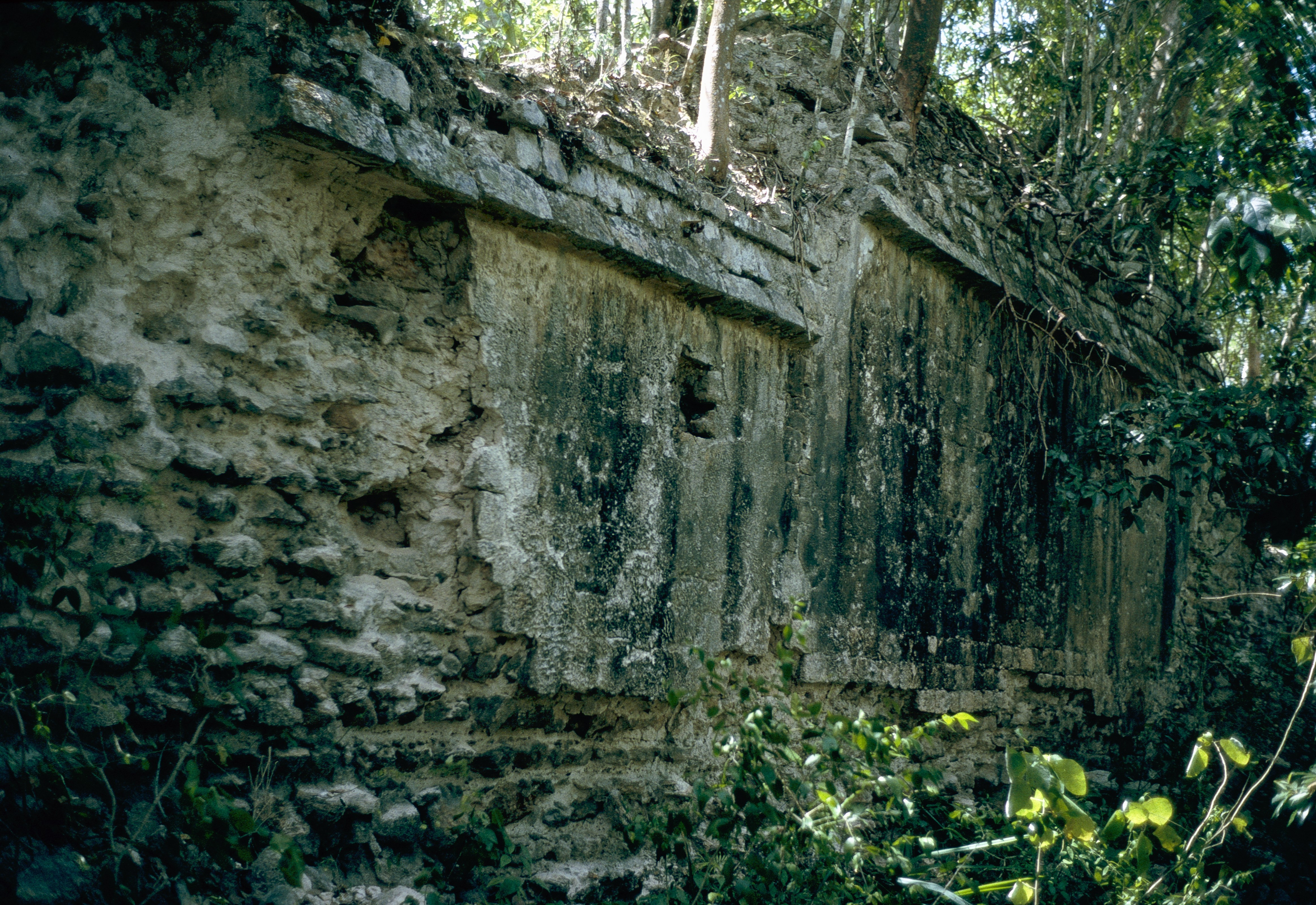
Structure at Witzinah

Archaeological studies made on the main pyramid of Witzinah have found that the stones with which the structures and buildings of the site were built using a mortar derived from natural rubber, resulting in an adhesive material that has provided great resistance to buildings of the site to this day. The source of rubber for the ancient Maya builders in Witzinah was the rubber tree (castilla elastica).
