= XHUM-FM =

Radio station in Valladolid, Yucatán

- Valladolid, Yucatán; Mexico
- Frequency: 92.7 FM
- Branding: Candela

Programming
- Format: Grupera and Tropical Music

Ownership
- Owner: Cadena RASA; (Medios Electrónicos de Valladolid, S.A. de C.V.)

History
- First air date: February 14, 1974 (concession)
- Former call signs: XEUM-AM
- Former frequencies: 990 kHz, 610 kHz

Technical information
- ERP: 25 kW
- Transmitter coordinates: 20°40′40″N 88°12′32″W

Links
- Website: cadenarasa.com

XHUM-FM is a radio station on 92.7 FM in Valladolid, Yucatán, Mexico. It is owned by Cadena RASA and known as Candela with a grupera and tropical music format.

== History ==
XEUM-AM 990, operating with 500 watts, received its concession on February 14, 1974. It was owned by Ricardo López Méndez. In the 1990s, XEUM increased power to 1,000 watts and was sold to Radiodifusora Comercial XEUM, S.A. de C.V., operating the station for Grupo ACIR. In 2005, ACIR was approved to move XEUM to 610 kHz with 10,000 watts. In 2006, Luis Aviña Ayala doing business as Medios Electrónicos de Valladolid bought the station.

XEUM moved to FM in 2010.
