= Temozón Municipality =

Municipality in the Mexican state of Yucatán

Temozón
- Municipality
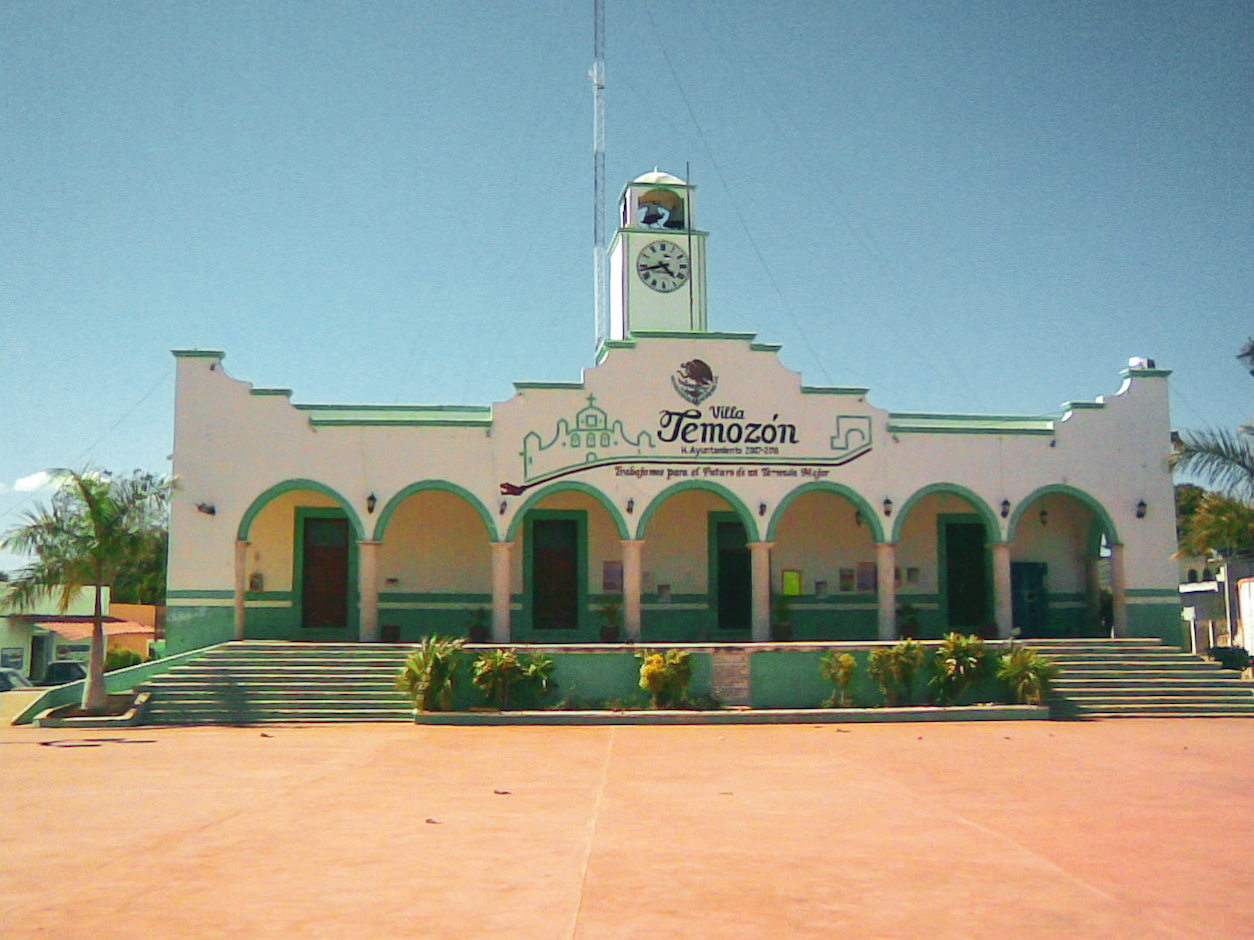

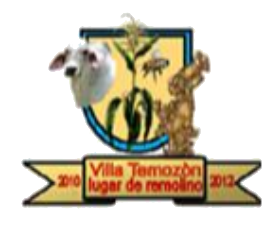
- Coat of arms

- Location of the Municipality in Mexico
- Coordinates: 20°55′N 87°55′W
- Country: Mexico
- State: Yucatán
- Mexico Ind.: 1821
- Yucatan Est.: 1824
- Municipality Est.: 1915
- Municipal seat: Temozón

Government
  - Type: PRI 2007-2010
  - Municipal President: Carlos Manuel Aguilar Loria

Area
  - Total: 1,087.06 km^{2} (419.72 sq mi)
- Elevation: 22 m (72 ft)

Population (2005)
  - Total: 14,008
  - Demonym: Temozonense
- Time zone: UTC-6 (Central Standard Time)
- INEGI Code: 085
- Major Airport: Merida (Manuel Crescencio Rejón) International Airport
- IATA Code: MID
- ICAO Code: MMMD

Temozón Municipality (in the Yucatec Maya language: "Place of the swirl") is a municipality in the Mexican state of Yucatán. Its municipal seat is located in the city of Temozón.

== Geography ==
This municipality is located in the eastern region of the state. It is between latitudes 20° 48 'and 20° 57' north and longitudes 87° 47' and 88 ° 16' west.

Its northern border is Calotmul - Tizimín, to the south is Valladolid, on the east Chemax and the west Espita and Uayma.

== Communities ==
The municipality is made up of 99 different communities, of which the most important are:

- Temozón (Municipal Center)
- Hunuku
- Nahbalam
- Yokdzonot Presentado
- Santa Rita

== Landmarks ==
=== Architectural ===
San Roman Church, built during the colonial period (probably in the eighteenth century). The church of San Antonio de Padua, and the municipal building.

=== Archeological ===
Ek' Balam
