= Radio Universidad (Yucatán) =

Radio service of the Universidad Autónoma de Yucatán

XERUY-AM / XHRUY-FM / XHMIN-FM
Mérida and Tizimín; Mexico
- Broadcast area: Yucatán
- Frequencies: 1120 kHz; 103.9 and 94.5 MHz
- Branding: Radio Universidad

Programming
- Format: College Radio

Ownership
- Owner: Universidad Autónoma de Yucatán

History
- First air date: April 6, 1966
- Call sign meaning: Radio Universidad Autónoma de Yucatán; XHMIN: TiziMÍN

Technical information
- Class: B
- Power: 2,000 watts daytime
- ERP: 14,850 watts (103.9 FM); 3,000 watts (94.5 FM)
- Transmitter coordinates: (XERUY-XHRUY) 21°01′26″N 89°33′14″W

Links
- Website: www.uady.mx/indexf.html

Radio Universidad in Mexico is the radio service of the Universidad Autónoma de Yucatán (UADY), broadcasting in Mérida and Tizimín.

UADY owns three radio stations, each broadcasting the same programming: XERUY-AM 1120 and XHRUY-FM 103.9 in Mérida, and XHMIN-FM 94.5 in Tizimín.

== History ==
The UADY's first radio station began transmissions on April 6, 1966, on 1400 kHz. The station was founded by Hernán Ramírez Coello, and the transmitter was built in Mérida by engineer Eduardo Maldonado.

In the 1970s, new university administration began to upgrade Radio Universidad considerably. The studios were renovated, professional audio equipment added, and a new, 1 kW transmitter donated by the president of Mexico. The station also eventually moved to its current 1120 kHz frequency. The 1980s saw further growth in the station's programming, broadcasting 10 hours a day, and in April 1998, the university received a permit for XHRUY-FM.

The permit for XHMIN in Tizimín was added in the 2000s; at the same time, the university also received a permit for a station to be located in Motul that was never built.
