= Tunkás =

Town in the Mexican state of Yucatán

- Municipal Seat
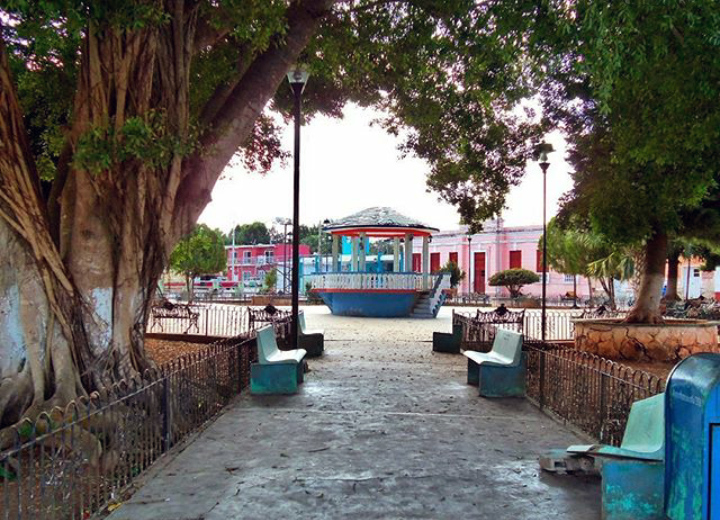

- Location within Yucatán (state)
- Coordinates: 20°54′09″N 88°45′05″W
- Country: Mexico
- State: Yucatán
- Municipality: Tunkás
- Elevation: 15 m (49 ft)

Population (2010)
  - Total: 2,828
- Time zone: UTC-6 (Central Standard Time)
- Postal code (of seat): 97650
- Area code: 991

Tunkás is a town and the municipal seat of the Tunkás Municipality, Yucatán in Mexico. As of 2010, the town has a population of 2,828.

== Geography ==
=== Climate ===
Tunkás

Climate chart (precipitation, max. and min. temperature)
J	F	M	A	M	J	J	A	S	O	N	D
77 25 16	30 26 19	35 30 20	99 32 20	172 33 22	232 28 21	259 26 21	256 27 21	325 26 21	220 24 20	81 24 18	43 24 17
- █ Average max. and min. temperatures in °C
- █ Precipitation totals in mm
Imperial conversion
J	F	M	A	M	J	J	A	S	O	N	D
3 77 61	1.2 79 66	1.4 86 68	3.9 90 68	6.8 91 72	9.1 82 70	10 79 70	10 81 70	13 79 70	8.7 75 68	3.2 75 64	1.7 75 63
- █ Average max. and min. temperatures in °F
- █ Precipitation totals in inches
