= Temozón =

Town in the Mexican state of Yucatán

- Municipal seat
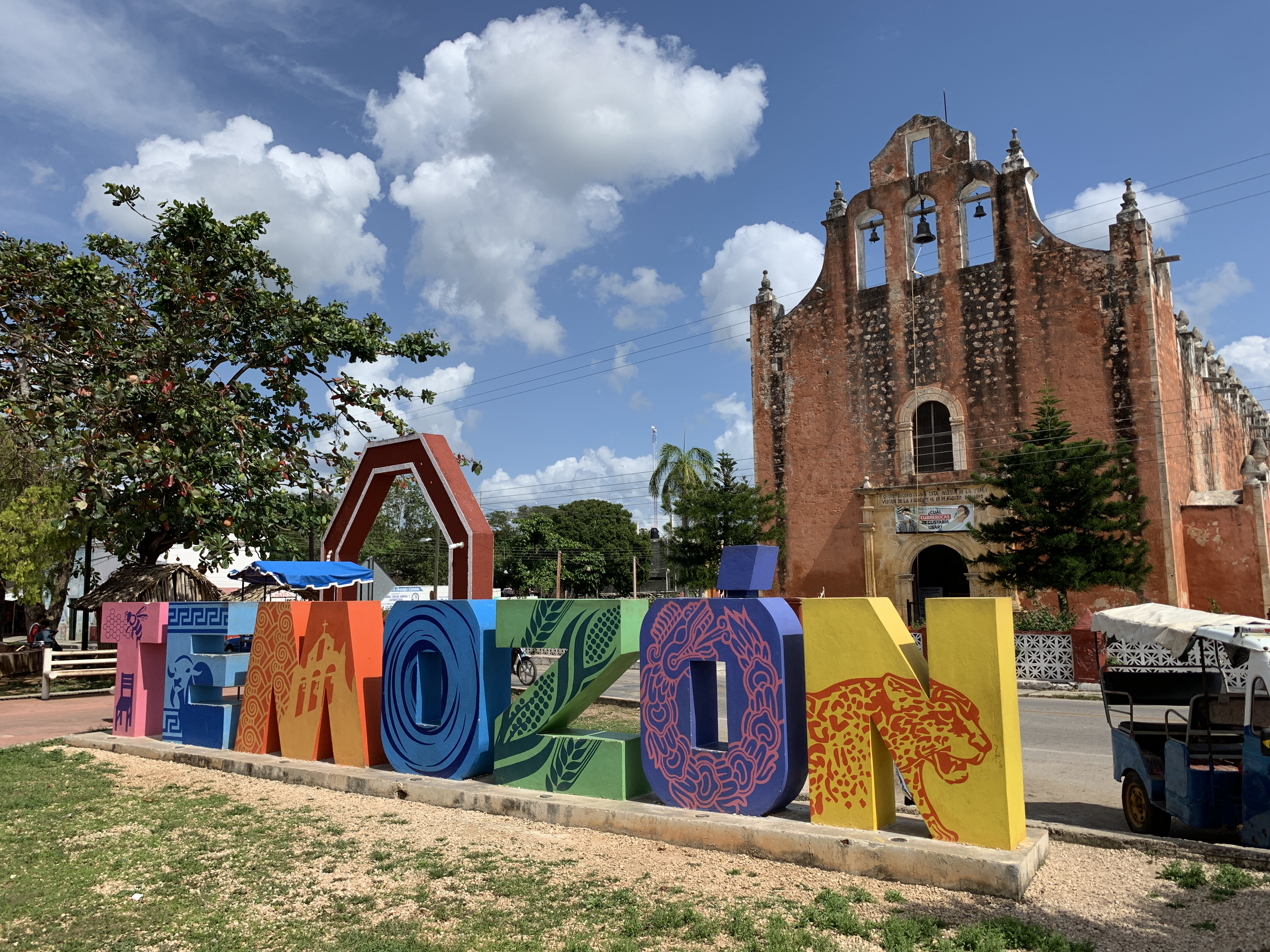
- Temozón sign

- Location within Yucatán (state)
- Coordinates: 20°48′15″N 88°12′10″W
- Country: Mexico
- State: Yucatán
- Municipality: Temozón

Area
  - Total: 2.79 km^{2} (1.08 sq mi)
- Elevation: 26 m (85 ft)

Population (2010)
  - Total: 6,553
  - Density: 2,350/km^{2} (6,080/sq mi)

Temozón is a town and the municipal seat of the Temozón Municipality, Yucatán in Mexico. It is the home of the Yucatec-Maya archaeological site Ekʼ Balam.
