= XHYW-FM =

Radio station in Mérida, Yucatán, Mexico

- San Pedro Nohpat-Mérida, Yucatán; Mexico
- Frequency: 98.9 MHz
- Branding: Radio Mexicana

Programming
- Format: Grupera

Ownership
- Owner: Valanci Media Group; (Impulsora de Radio del Sureste, S.A.)
- Sister stations: XHFCY-FM

History
- First air date: November 6, 1978 (concession)
- Former frequencies: 1270 kHz (1978–1983); 760 kHz (1983–2011); 106.7 MHz (2011–2018)

Technical information
- ERP: 25 kW
- Transmitter coordinates: 20°57′16″N 89°34′08″W

Links
- Website: radiomexicana.com.mx/merida/

XHYW-FM is a radio station on 98.9 FM in San Pedro Nohpat, Yucatán, Mexico, in the Mérida metropolitan area. It is owned by Valanci Media Group and carries a grupera format known as Radio Mexicana.

== History ==
Amira del Pilar Romero Iriondo obtained the concession for XEYW-AM 1270, located in Uman, Yucatán, on November 6, 1978. The 2.5 kW station was sold to Tropiradio in 1983. Tropiradio moved it to Mérida on 760 kHz. XEYW authorized to move to FM in 2011.

Until 2016, it carried the grupera format from Grupo Siete (La Jefa and later La Única). In early 2016, when this was renamed Bengala, XHYW broke off.

As part of its 2017 concession renewal, XHYW-FM was slated to move to 98.9 MHz, in order to clear 106-108 MHz as much as possible for community and indigenous radio stations. The frequency change took place in February 2018.

In 2021, Valanci Media Group (then known as Grupo Radio Digital, GRD) took over operation of XHYW and XHFCY from Rivas Radio, which was formed after an internal split within the Rivas cluster. The station's Mexicanísima format was renamed Radio Mexicana, in line with similarly programmed GRD stations, in July 2022. The concession transfer was approved by the Federal Telecommunications Institute (IFT) on October 26, 2022.
