= Tunkás Municipality =

Municipality in the Mexican state of Yucatán

Tunkás
- Municipality
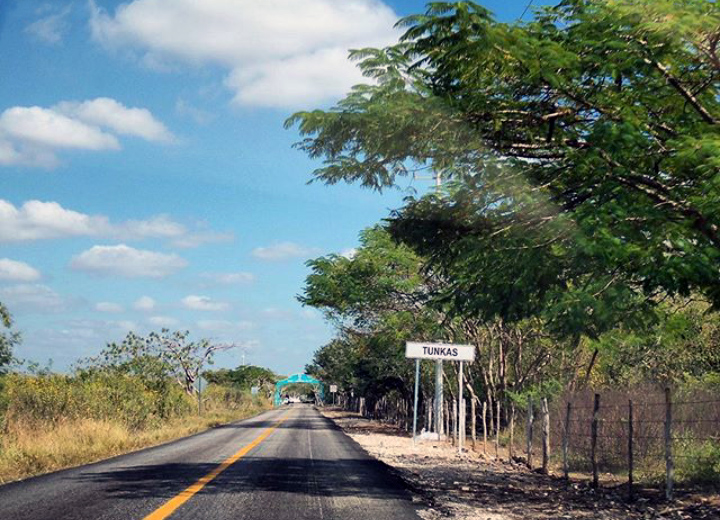

- Region 3 Centro #097

- Location within Mexico
- Coordinates: 20°54′04″N 88°45′05″W
- Country: Mexico
- State: Yucatán

Government
  - Type: 2012–2015
  - Municipal President: Maria Elena Dominguez Kuh

Area
  - Total: 514.79 km^{2} (198.76 sq mi)

Population (2010)
  - Total: 3,464
- Time zone: UTC-6 (Central Standard Time)
- INEGI Code: 097
- Major Airport: Merida (Manuel Crescencio Rejón) International Airport
- IATA Code: MID
- ICAO Code: MMMD

Tunkás Municipality (In the Yucatec Maya language: “bad or ugly stone”) is a municipality in the Mexican state of Yucatán containing 514.79 square kilometres (198.76 sq mi) of land and located roughly 98 kilometres (61 mi) east of the city of Mérida.

The municipality relies on farming for the majority of its economy, along with remittances from emigrants. Tunakseños migrate to the beach resorts of Quintana Roo, mostly Cancún and Playa del Carmen, as well as to the United States. Large concentrations of people from Tunkás can be found in Inglewood and Anaheim, both in California.

== History ==
In ancient history, the area belonged to the chieftainship of Cupul until the conquest. At colonization, Tunkás became part of the encomienda system and the encomenderos listed in 1735 were Diego Ramón del Castillo y Juan and Baltazar de la Cámara. In 1821, Yucatán was declared independent of the Spanish Crown. In 1825 the area was part of the Valladolid region.

== Governance ==
The municipal president is elected for a term of three years. The president appoints four Councilpersons to serve on the board for three year terms, as the Secretary and councilors of public services, public security, and ecology.

== Communities ==
The head of the municipality is Tunkás, Yucatán. There are 15 inhabited communities in the municipality: Canasultun, Ebulá, Franz, Kancabal, Kancabchen, Onichén, San Antonio Chuc, San Dimas, San José Pibtuch, San Román, Tabichén, Tunkás, Xcauil, Yaxhá, and Yohuas. The major population areas are shown below:

| Community | Population |
|---|---|
| Entire Municipality (2010) | 3,464 |
| San Antonio Chuc | 248 in 2005 |
| San José Pibtuch | 188 in 2005 |
| Tunkás | 2812 in 2005 |

== Local festivals ==
Every year from 20 to 24 December the area celebrates a festival for St. Thomas the Apostle, patron of the town. From 30 January to 2 February, an annual fair is held which attracts people from other areas of the region.

== Tourist attractions ==
- Templo de Tunkás, the colonial-era church
- Municipal Palace
- Cenote Chan
- Cenote Chan Lukun X’azul
- Cenote Mumundzonot
- Cenote X’tekdzonot
