= KTXW =

Radio station in Texas, United States

- Manor, Texas; United States
- Broadcast area: Austin-Central Texas metropolitan area
- Frequency: 1120 kHz
- Branding: The Bridge

Programming
- Format: Christian radio
- Affiliations: Salem Radio Network

Ownership
- Owner: GLG Media, LLC

History
- First air date: 2014
- Former call signs: KIXL, KLGO

Technical information
- Licensing authority: FCC
- Facility ID: 160615
- Class: B
- Power: 5,600 watts (day); 155 watts (night)
- Transmitter coordinates: 30°19′52.7″N 97°30′26.0″W
- Translator: 101.1 K266CI (Austin)

Links
- Public license information: Public file; LMS
- Webcast: Listen live
- Website: thebridgeaustin.com

KTXW (1120 AM) is a commercial radio station licensed to Manor, Texas, United States, serving Greater Austin. The station broadcasts a Christian format. It is owned by GLG Media, Inc.

KTXW is also heard on FM translator station K266CI at 101.1 MHz in Austin.

== History ==
The station first signed on the air in 2010 as KIXL. Originally the 1120 kHz frequency was assigned to Cleburne, Texas, near Dallas. KCLE had been on the air from 1947 to 2008, when it moved to AM 1140, getting a boost in power and better coverage of the Dallas-Fort Worth Metroplex. It now has the callsign KCPP.

KCLE's move to another frequency created the opportunity for AM 1120 to go on the air in the Austin radio market.

== Programming ==
KTXW airs both national and local religious shows, using a brokered programming arrangement. Hosts pay for their time on the air and may seek donations to support their ministry.

== Translators ==
Call sign	Frequency	City of license	FID	ERP (W)	HAAT	Class	FCC info
K266CI	101.1 FM	Austin, Texas	144896	85	304 m (997 ft)	D	LMS
