= XHPYM-FM =

Radio station in Mérida, Yucatán, Mexico

- Mérida, Yucatán; Mexico
- Frequency: 103.1 MHz
- Branding: Retro 103.1

Programming
- Format: English and Spanish adult contemporary

Ownership
- Owner: Cadena RASA; (La Voz del Mayab, S.A.)
- Sister stations: XHMQM-FM, XHMH-FM, XHUL-FM

History
- First air date: July 27, 1961 (concession)
- Former call signs: XEPY-AM
- Former frequencies: 1450 kHz, 680 kHz
- Call sign meaning: Station was formerly XEPY-AM, with an added M for Mérida at migration

Technical information
- ERP: 25 kW
- Transmitter coordinates: 21°00′54″N 89°33′41″W

Links
- Website: cadenarasa.com/yucatan/merida/retro

XHPYM-FM is a radio station on 103.1 FM in Mérida, Yucatán, Mexico. It is owned by Cadena RASA and is known as Retro 103.1 with an English and spanish adult contemporary format.

== History ==
XEPY-AM 1450 received its concession on July 27, 1961. It was a 250-watt station, raising power to 1,000 watts in the 1980s and later moving to 680 kHz with 2,500 watts day.

It migrated to FM after being authorized in 2010. Its call sign was changed to XHPYM-FM with an added M for Mérida.

On January 1, 2023, Cadena RASA moved the Los 40 format and on-air staff from XHUL-FM 96.9 to XHPYM-FM, displacing its existing "Retro FM" classic hits format.

The station rejoined "Retro FM" on January 1, 2025, having become part of Cadena RASA.
