= Peto, Yucatán =

Town in the Mexican state of Yucatán

Peto
- Municipal Seat
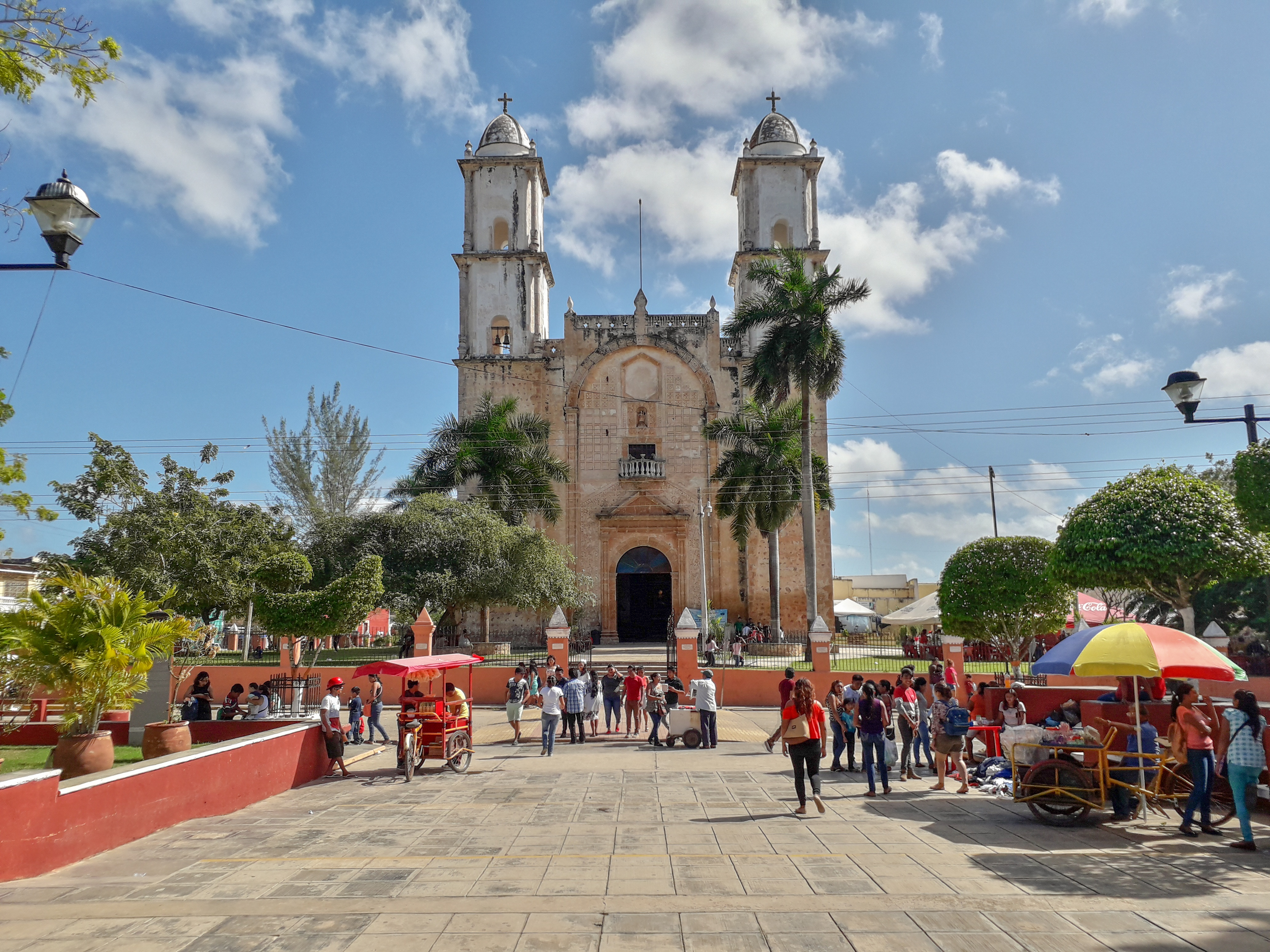
- Church in Peto

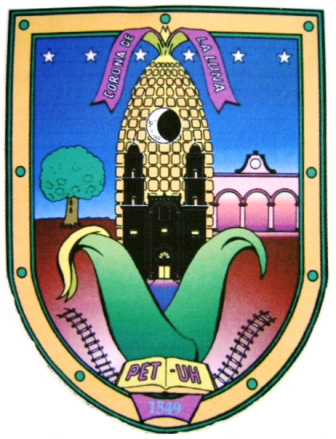
- Coat of arms

- Location within Yucatán (state)
- Coordinates: 20°07′32″N 88°55′17″W
- Country: Mexico
- State: Yucatán
- Municipality: Peto
- Founded: 1549
- Elevation: 40 m (130 ft)

Population (2010)
  - Total: 19,821
- Time zone: UTC-6 (Central Standard Time)
- Postal code: 97930
- Area code: 997
- Demonym: petuleño, petuleña

Peto is a town and the municipal seat of the Peto Municipality, located in the state of Yucatán, Mexico. With a population of approximately 21,456 according to the 2020 census, Peto serves as a cultural and historical center in southeastern Yucatán. The name “Peto” derives from the Mayan words pet (crown) and uj (moon), meaning “crown of the moon.”

Peto was founded in 1549 by the Spanish conquistador, Francisco de Berreo.

== Etymology ==
From the Maya pet crown and uj moon thus meaning crowned moon, in reference to a lunar halo.

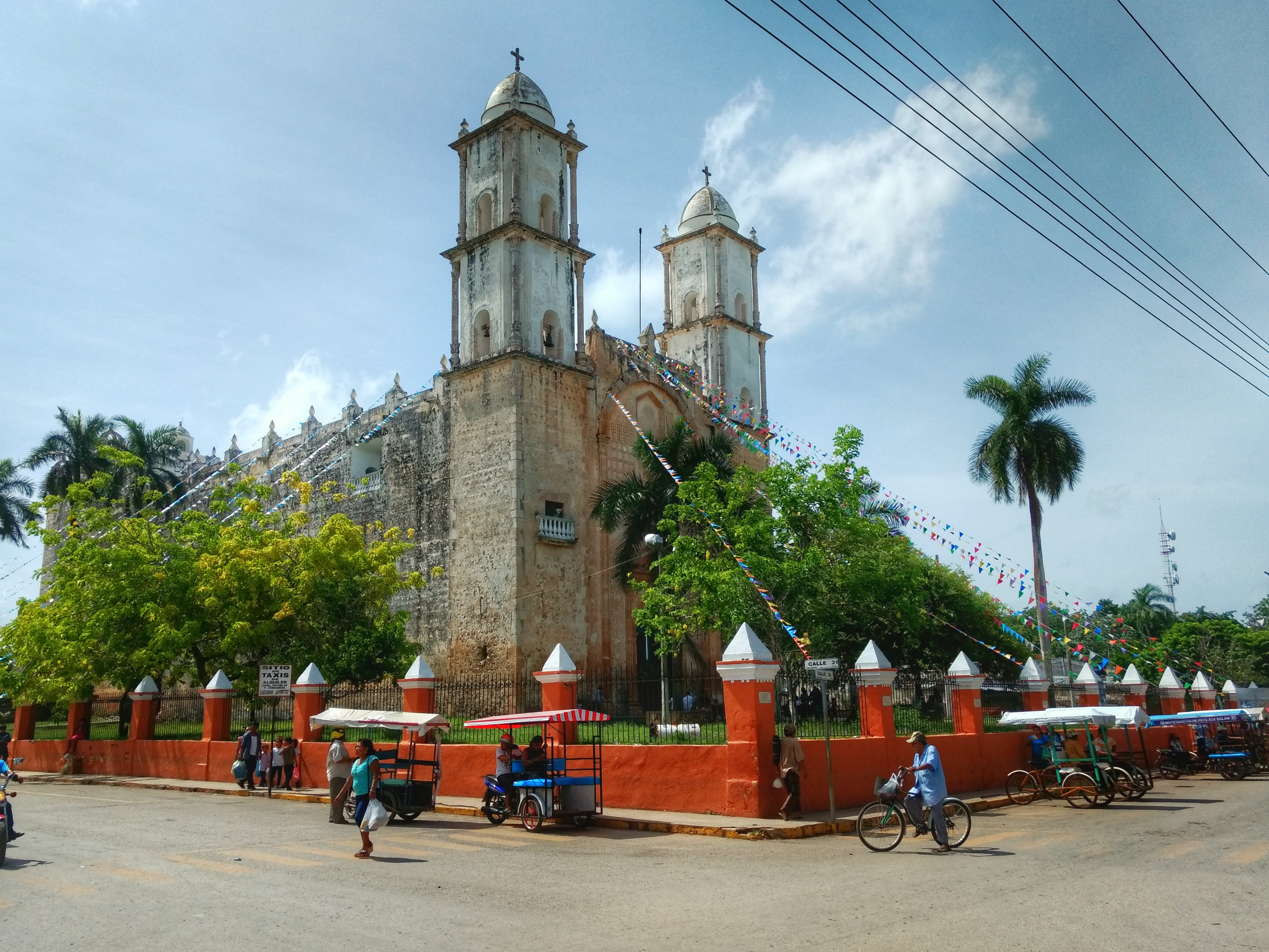

== Demographics ==
View chart definition.

== Geography ==
=== Climate ===
Peto

Climate chart (precipitation, max. and min. temperature)
J	F	M	A	M	J	J	A	S	O	N	D
81 24 16	31 26 18	29 29 20	94 30 21	181 31 22	212 28 22	232 27 20	257 28 21	290 26 21	243 24 20	90 24 17	53 24 17
- █ Average max. and min. temperatures in °C
- █ Precipitation totals in mm
Imperial conversion
J	F	M	A	M	J	J	A	S	O	N	D
3.2 75 61	1.2 79 64	1.1 84 68	3.7 86 70	7.1 88 72	8.3 82 72	9.1 81 68	10 82 70	11 79 70	9.6 75 68	3.5 75 63	2.1 75 63
- █ Average max. and min. temperatures in °F
- █ Precipitation totals in inches

== List of mayors ==
- Gerónimo Sánchez (1941-1942)
- Wilfrido Alonso (1943-1944)
- Pedro Muñoz Sánchez (1945-1946)
- Francisco Trejo (1947-1949)
- Rosendo Arrollo (1950-1952)
- Guillermo Baduy Ayala (1953-1955)
- José I. Hernández (1956-1958)
- Nicolás Sogbi Canto (1959-1961)
- Casildo Arroyo (1962-1963)
- Juan Escamilla Sosa (1963)
- Sergio Salazar López (1963-1967)
- Zenón Muñoz Martínez (1968-1970)
- César A. Ruiz V. (1971-1973)
- Mario Arturo Pérez (1974-1975)
- Sergio Salazar López (1976-1978)
- Roger Calero Muñoz (1979-1981)
- Felipe Sosa Buenfil (1982-1984)
- Gilberto Góngora Sánchez (1985-1987)
- Héctor Sosa Duarte (1988-1990)
- José Vicente Domínguez Canto (1991-1993)
- Castulo Ake Can (1994-1995)
- Samuel Castillo Yah (1996-1998)
- Ruperto Sánchez Uluhac -(1999-2001)
- Jorge Román Avilez y Manzanilla (2001-2004)
- Gilberto Alonso Navarrete Vázquez (2004-2007)
- José Vicente Domínguez Canto (2007-2010)
- Martha Raquel González Cámara (2010-2012)
- Higinio Chan Acosta (2012-2015)
- Jaime Ariel Hernández Santos (2015-2018)
- Edgar Román Calderón Sosa (2018-2021)
