= WMSW =

Hatillo, Puerto Rico; Puerto Rico
- Frequency: 1120 kHz
- Branding: Radio Once

Programming
- Format: News/Talk
- Affiliations: Radio Isla

Ownership
- Owner: Aurora Broadcasting Corporation
- Sister stations: WNIK, WNIK-FM

History
- First air date: December 24, 1980; 45 years ago

Technical information
- Licensing authority: FCC
- Facility ID: 3257
- Class: B
- Power: 5,000 watts
- Transmitter coordinates: 18°28′15″N 66°50′24″W

Links
- Public license information: Public file; LMS
- Website: radioonce.com

WMSW (1120 AM, "Radio Once") is a radio station licensed to serve Hatillo, Puerto Rico. The station is owned by Aurora Broadcasting Corporation. It airs a News/Talk format.

The station was assigned the WMSW call letters by the Federal Communications Commission on December 31, 1979.
