= XHFCY-FM =

Radio station in Mérida, Yucatán

- Mérida, Yucatán; Mexico
- Frequency: 105.9 MHz
- Branding: Super Stereo

Programming
- Format: Contemporary music in Spanish

Ownership
- Owner: Valanci Media Group; (Radio Espectáculo, S.A.)
- Sister stations: XHYW-FM

History
- First air date: July 26, 1930, 2010 (on FM)
- Former call signs: XEFC-AM
- Former frequencies: 1090 AM; 1330 AM; 1050 AM
- Call sign meaning: Felipe Carrillo/Yucatán; (Y added in AM-FM migration)

Technical information
- Class: B1
- ERP: 25 kW
- HAAT: 74.75 m
- Transmitter coordinates: 20°58′55.6″N 89°41′07.8″W

Links
- Website: superstereomerida.com

XHFCY-FM is a radio station in Mérida, Yucatán, in Mexico, with transmitter at San Pedro Nohpat. Broadcasting on 105.9 FM, XHFCY is owned by Valanci Media Group and carries a contemporary music format known as Super Stereo.

== History ==
Rafael Rivas Franco and Julio Molina Font put XEFC-AM 1050 on air July 26, 1930. Rivas gave XEFC its call sign in honor of Felipe Carrillo Puerto, a former governor of the state who had been executed in 1924. Font sold his stake in the station, and the concession, to Rivas in 1944. XEFC was the first station in what came to be known as Organización Radio Peninsular, which later expanded to include additional Mérida and Yucatán radio stations and is now known as Grupo Rivas. XEFC later moved to 1330 AM in the 1950s and slid to 1090 kHz in the early 2000s.

On July 1, 2010, XHFCY-FM 105.9 signed on as part of the national plan to move most AM radio stations to FM. The added Y in the callsign allowed the avoidance of a callsign conflict with then-XHFC-FM, a community station in Michoacán.

In 2021, Grupo Radio Digital took over operation of XHYW and XHFCY from Rivas Radio, which was formed after an internal split within the Rivas cluster. The concession transfer was approved by the Federal Telecommunications Institute (IFT) on October 26, 2022.
