= WNIK-FM =

Radio station serving northern Puerto Rico

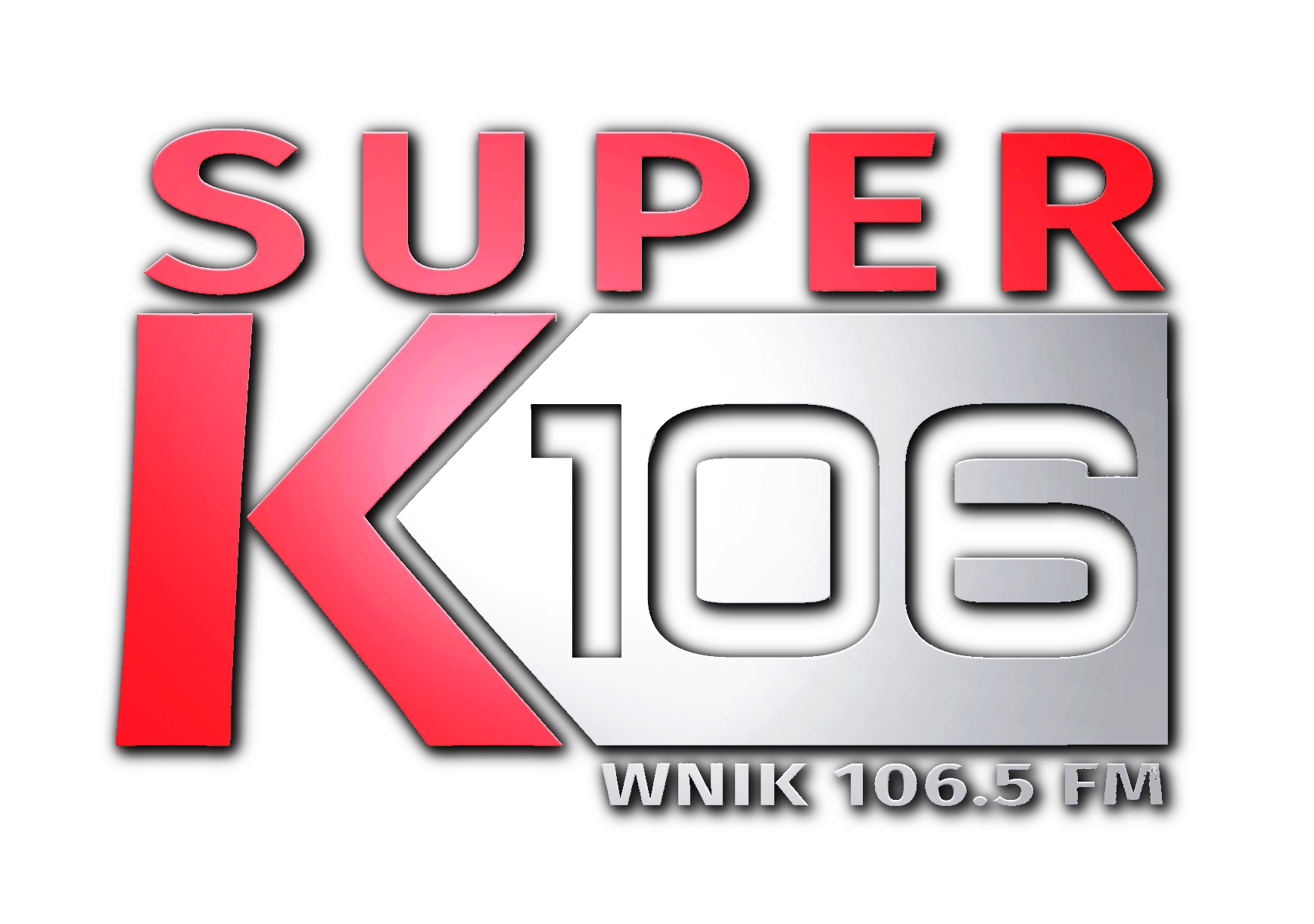
- Arecibo, Puerto Rico; Puerto Rico
- Broadcast area: Puerto Rico
- Frequency: 106.5 MHz
- Branding: Super K 106

Programming
- Format: Top 40/CHR

Ownership
- Owner: Kelly Broadcasting System Corp.
- Sister stations: WMSW, WNIK

History
- First air date: 1965; 61 years ago

Technical information
- Licensing authority: FCC
- Facility ID: 33877
- Class: B
- ERP: 31,000 watts
- HAAT: 852.0 meters (2,795.3 ft)
- Transmitter coordinates: 18°27′20″N 66°44′24″W

Links
- Public license information: Public file; LMS
- Website: www.superk106.com

WNIK-FM (106.5 FM) branded on-air as Super K 106, is a radio station broadcasting a Top 40/CHR format. Licensed to Arecibo, Puerto Rico, it serves the northern Puerto Rico area. The station is currently owned by Kelly Broadcasting System Corporation.
