= XHMH-FM =

Radio station in Mérida, Yucatán, Mexico

- Mérida, Yucatán; Mexico
- Frequency: 95.3 FM
- Branding: Candela

Programming
- Format: Tropical music Grupera

Ownership
- Owner: Cadena RASA; (Radio Mérida, S.A.)
- Sister stations: XHMQM-FM, XHUL-FM, XHPYM-FM

History
- First air date: April 16, 1941; 1994 (FM)
- Former call signs: XEMH-AM (1941–2018)
- Former frequencies: 1400 kHz (1941–1960s); 970 kHz (1960s–2018)

Technical information
- Class: B1
- ERP: 25 kW
- HAAT: 1.6 m
- Transmitter coordinates: 20°58′44.4″N 89°37′9.2″W

Links
- Webcast: Listen live
- Website: cadenarasa.com

XHMH-FM 95.3 is a radio station in Mérida, Yucatán, Mexico. It is known as Candela and carries a tropical/grupera format.

== History ==
XHMH, originally XEMH-AM, is among the oldest radio stations in southeastern Mexico. It began on 1400 kHz, with a concession awarded to Álvaro Barquet Y. in 1941. The station, then known as "La Voz del Trópico", came on the air in September of that year. The station was sold to Manuel Araujo Echeverría, its founder, in 1951, and then to Radio Mérida, S.A., and by the 1960s had moved to its final dial position of 970; it broadcast with 5,000 watts day and 500 night.

It was authorized to become an AM-FM combo in 1994. On January 30, 2018, Cadena RASA informed the Federal Telecommunications Institute that it was opting to surrender its AM frequency.
