= WNIK (AM) =

Radio station in Arecibo, Puerto Rico

Arecibo, Puerto Rico; Puerto Rico
- Frequency: 1230 kHz
- Branding: Unica Radio

Programming
- Format: News/Talk
- Affiliations: WKAQ 580

Ownership
- Owner: Unik Broadcasting System Corporation
- Sister stations: WMSW, WNIK-FM

History
- First air date: June 1959; 66 years ago

Technical information
- Licensing authority: FCC
- Facility ID: 33876
- Class: B
- Power: 10,000 watts
- Transmitter coordinates: 18°27′20″N 66°44′24″W

Links
- Public license information: Public file; LMS
- Website: unicaradioam.com

WNIK (1230 AM, "Unica Radio") is a radio station licensed to serve Arecibo, Puerto Rico. The station is owned by Unik Broadcasting System Corporation. It airs a News/Talk format.

The station was assigned the WNIK call letters by the Federal Communications Commission.
