= XHMQM-FM =

Radio station in Mérida, Yucatán, Mexico

- Mérida, Yucatán, Mexico; Mexico
- Frequency: 90.9 MHz
- Branding: La Ke Buena

Programming
- Format: Regional Mexican
- Affiliations: Radiópolis

Ownership
- Owner: Cadena RASA; (Radio Mayab, S.A.)
- Sister stations: XHMH-FM, XHUL-FM, XHPYM-FM

History
- First air date: December 18, 1941 (concession)
- Former call signs: XEMQ-AM
- Former frequencies: 1240 kHz (1941–1990s); 810 kHz (1990s–2010)

Technical information
- ERP: 25 kW
- Transmitter coordinates: 21°02′55″N 89°37′58″W

Links
- Webcast: Listen live
- Website: cadenarasa.com

XHMQM-FM is a radio station on 90.9 FM in Mérida, Yucatán, Mexico. It is owned by Cadena RASA and carries the La Ke Buena Regional Mexican format from Radiópolis.

== History ==
Logo as La Ke Buena used to 2021

XEMQ-AM 1240 received its concession on December 18, 1941. It was owned by Lázaro Achurra Suárez and sold to Radio Mayab in 1970. XEMQ moved to 810 kHz in the 1990s. The name of the format was known as "Tus Panteras Juveniles" broadcasting pop and rock music. The plural panthers in the branding referred to XEMQ broadcasting on shortwave under the call sign XEQM. In 2005, XEMQ began broadcasting Mayan-language programming under the name Yóol lik'. In 2010, the station returned to a Spanish-language format as Átomo 810.

It migrated to FM after being authorized in 2010, and its call sign changed to XHMQM-FM, with an added M for Mérida. Upon migration, it began airing W Radio news/talk programs. In 2015, the Ke Buena grupera format that had previously used on XHMRI-FM 93.7 moved to XHMQM.
