= WHOG (AM) =

Radio station in Hobson City–Anniston, Alabama

- Hobson City, Alabama; United States
- Broadcast area: Anniston, Alabama
- Frequency: 1120 kHz
- Branding: 93.5 The Hog

Programming
- Format: Soul/R&B

Ownership
- Owner: Hobson City Broadcasting Company

History
- First air date: April 15, 1991
- Former call signs: WHOX (1987–1988, CP); WJOK (1988–1990, CP)
- Call sign meaning: Hog

Technical information
- Licensing authority: FCC
- Facility ID: 27434
- Class: D
- Power: 500 watts (day)
- Transmitter coordinates: 33°36′50″N 85°51′19″W
- Translator: 93.5 W228EK (Anniston)

Links
- Public license information: Public file; LMS
- Website: www.935whog.com

WHOG (1120 AM) is a radio station licensed to serve Hobson City, Alabama, United States. The station is owned by Hobson City Broadcasting Company.

1120 AM is United States clear-channel frequency.

WHOG airs a "Smooth Soul and R&B" format to the Anniston, Alabama, area.

== History ==
This station received its original construction permit from the Federal Communications Commission on May 1, 1987. The new station was assigned the call letters WHOX by the FCC on June 9, 1987. The station, while under construction, changed its call letters to WJOK on November 1, 1988, and again to the current WHOG call letters on December 28, 1990. After several extensions to its construction permit, WHOG received its license to cover from the FCC on April 29, 1991.
