= WTWZ =

- Clinton, Mississippi; United States
- Broadcast area: Jackson, Mississippi
- Frequency: 1120 kHz
- Branding: 102.5 The Concert Hall

Programming
- Format: Oldies religious programming (mornings) vintage radio shows (overnight)
- Affiliations: USA Radio Network

Ownership
- Owner: Wood Broadcasting (headed by Terry Wood)

Technical information
- Licensing authority: FCC
- Facility ID: 73601
- Class: D
- Power: 10,000 watts day 2,500 watts critical hours
- Transmitter coordinates: 32°21′03″N 90°20′22″W
- Translator: 102.5 W273CY (Jackson)

Links
- Public license information: Public file; LMS
- Webcast: Listen live
- Website: wtwzradio.com

WTWZ (1120 AM) is a radio station licensed to serve Clinton, Mississippi, United States. The station is owned by Wood Broadcasting. Its format is Oldies, with religious programming every morning.

The station has been assigned these call letters by the Federal Communications Commission since April 19, 1982.

WTWZ had originally broadcast on 1150 kHz with 500 watts.

To give the station nighttime coverage, WTWZ can also be heard via translator station W273CY 102.5 FM.

WTWZ airs vintage radio shows overnight.

In May, 2022, WTWZ made the switch to oldies. However, it still has religious programming every morning.
