= XHMT-FM =

Radio station in Mérida, Yucatán

- Mérida, Yucatán; Mexico
- Frequency: 98.5 MHz
- Branding: La Comadre

Programming
- Format: Grupera

Ownership
- Owner: Grupo SIPSE; (SIPSE, S.A. de C.V.)
- Sister stations: XHYU-FM, XHGL-FM

History
- First air date: January 16, 1980 (concession)

Technical information
- ERP: 7.5 kW
- HAAT: 90.6 meters
- Transmitter coordinates: 20°58′40″N 89°37′17″W

Links
- Website: www.lacomadremerida.com

XHMT-FM is a radio station on 98.5 FM in Mérida, Yucatán, Mexico. It is owned by Grupo SIPSE and is known as La Comadre with a Grupera format.

== History ==
XHMT received its concession on January 16, 1980. It was owned by Ricardo López Méndez until its sale to Grupo ACIR in the 1990s. In 2006, control passed to Grupo SIPSE along with XHYU-FM, with a concession transfer was approved in 2013, which continued to operate them with similar formats with identical names.
