= XHYU-FM =

Radio station in Mérida, Yucatán, Mexico

- Mérida, Yucatán; Mexico
- Frequency: 100.1 MHz
- Branding: Amor

Programming
- Format: Romantic

Ownership
- Owner: Grupo SIPSE Radio; (SIPSE, S.A. de C.V.)
- Sister stations: XHMT-FM, XHGL-FM

History
- First air date: February 19, 1993 (concession)
- Call sign meaning: "Yu"catán

Technical information
- Class: B1
- ERP: 7.5 kW
- HAAT: 90.6 meters
- Transmitter coordinates: 20°58′40″N 89°37′17″W

Links
- Webcast: Listen live
- Website: sipseplay.com

XHYU-FM is a radio station on 100.1 FM in Mérida, Yucatán, Mexico. It is owned by Grupo SIPSE Radio and is known as Amor with a romantic format.

== History ==
XHYU received its concession on February 19, 1993. It was owned by Mensaje Radiofónico, S.A., a subsidiary of Radiorama, and slated to broadcast on 100.9 MHz, but soon moved. Within five years, Radiorama had sold XHYU to Grupo ACIR. In 2006, ACIR would sell ownership of its Mérida stations to SIPSE along with XHMT-FM 98.5, with a concession transfer was approved in 2012, which continues to program with similar formats with identical names.
