= XHMYL-FM =

Radio station in Mérida, Yucatán

- Mérida, Yucatán; Mexico
- Frequency: 92.1 MHz
- Branding: MYL FM 92.1

Programming
- Format: Pop

Ownership
- Owner: Corporativo Rivas; (Radio Mil del Sur, S.A. de C.V.)
- Sister stations: XHMRI-FM, XHMET-FM (Valladolid)

History
- First air date: July 18, 1984; 1994 (FM)
- Former call signs: XEMYL-AM (1984–2023)
- Former frequencies: 1000 kHz (1984–2023)
- Call sign meaning: A variation on "mil" (1000), or for Mérida, Yucatán

Technical information
- ERP: 2.85 kW

Links
- Webcast: XHMYL-FM
- Website: corporativorivas.com//

XHMYL-FM 92.1 is a radio station in Mérida, Yucatán. Branded as MYL FM 92.1, it broadcasts a pop music format.

== History ==
The concession for XEMYL-AM 1000 was awarded in 1984 to Radio Mil del Sur, S.A. de C.V. The FM station was added in 1994 as part of the award of combo frequencies to 83 FM stations nationally.

Until May 31, 2015, the station carried the Los 40 Principales national format from Televisa Radio. Between 2015 and November 2020, the station broadcast an alternative music format known as So Good.

On November 16, 2020, So Good and Grupo Rivas parted ways, and Rivas relaunched the station as "MYL FM".

The AM frequency was relinquished on February 28, 2023.
