= XHGL-FM =

Radio station in Mérida, Yucatán

- Mérida, Yucatán; Mexico
- Frequency: 97.7 MHz
- Branding: Kiss 977

Programming
- Format: Adult contemporary

Ownership
- Owner: Grupo SIPSE; (Stereo Maya, S.A. de C.V.)
- Sister stations: XHYU-FM, XHMT-FM

History
- First air date: January 23, 1969 (concession)
- Call sign meaning: Original concessionaire Andrés García Lavín

Technical information
- ERP: 80 kW

Links
- Website: sipse.com/97.7/

XHGL-FM is a radio station on 97.7 FM in Mérida, Yucatán, Mexico. It is owned by Grupo SIPSE and is known as Kiss FM with an adult contemporary format.

== History ==
XHGL received its concession on January 23, 1969. It was owned by Andrés García Lavin, founder of Grupo SIPSE, and was the first FM station in Yucatán, broadcasting with an ERP of 8.925 kW. Power has steadily risen, to 14 kW in the 1980s, 45 kW in the 1990s, and currently 80 kW.
