= List of radio stations in Nuevo León =

This is a list of CRT-licensed radio stations in the Mexican state of Nuevo León, which can be sorted by their call signs, frequencies, location, ownership, names, and programming formats.

Radio stations in Nuevo León
Call sign	Frequency	Location	Owner	Name	Format
XEBJB-AM	570 AM	Apodaca	Notigramex, S.A. de C.V.	BJB Regional Mexicana	Regional Mexican
XEFB-AM	630 AM	Monterrey	Emisora 1150, S.A. de C.V.	Arre en Acustik	Regional Mexican
XEFZ-AM	660 AM	Monterrey	Notigramex, S.A. de C.V.	ABC Deportes	Sports talk
XERG-AM	690 AM	Guadalupe	La Voz de Linares, S.A.	RG La Deportiva	Sports talk
XEACH-AM	770 AM	Guadalupe	Transmisora Regional Radio Fórmula, S.A. de C.V.	Radio Fórmula	News/talk
XEERG-AM	800 AM	Ojo de Agua	Radio Triunfos, S.A. de C.V.	RG La Deportiva	Sports talk
XELN-AM (Note: Linked to XHR-FM, which must keep XELN-AM on the air until there are no listeners in its service area unserved by other radio stations. XHR-FM was formerly XHLN-FM.)	830 AM	Linares	La Voz de Linares, S.A.	La Caliente	Regional Mexican
XENL-AM	860 AM	Monterrey	La Voz de Linares, S.A.	Radio Recuerdo	Spanish oldies
XET-AM	990 AM	San Nicolás de los Garza	Radio Triunfos, S.A. de C.V.	La T Grande	News, soap opera's, Regional Mexican
XEG-AM	1050 AM	Monterrey	La Voz de Norteamérica, S.A. de C.V.	La Ranchera de Monterrey	Regional Mexican
XEAU-AM	1090 AM	Guadalupe	Radio Centinela, S.A. de C.V.	Milenio Radio	News/talk
XEMR-AM	1140 AM	Apodaca	Notigramex, S.A. de C.V.	Radio Esperanza	Christian
XECT-AM	1190 AM	Guadalupe	Canal 1190, S.A. de C.V.	La Voz	Christian
XEIZ-AM	1230 AM	Monterrey	Transmisora Regional Radio Fórmula, S.A. de C.V.	Radio Fórmula	News/talk
XEAW-AM	1280 AM	Guadalupe	Multimedios, S.A. de C.V.	La Gran AW	Spanish oldies
XEVB-AM	1310 AM	San Nicolás de los Garza	Grupo Radio Alegría, S.A. de C.V.	ABC Noticias	News/talk
XENV-AM	1340 AM	Monterrey	Profesionales de la Radio, S.A. de C.V.	Radio 13, + Vallenata	Vallenata
XESH-AM (Note: Linked to XHESH-FM, which must keep XESH-AM on the air until there are no listeners in its service area unserved by other radio stations.)	1400 AM	Sabinas Hidalgo	Radiodifusoras Independientes, S.A. de C.V.	Radio Sabinas	Regional Mexican
XETKR-AM	1480 AM	Guadalupe	Multimedios, S.A. de C.V.	Radio Vida	Christian
XESTN-AM	1540 AM	Monterrey	Radio Red, S.A. de C.V.	Universal	English classic hits
XECSGH-AM	1570 AM	Monterrey	Edeysi Yolisea González Roblero	—N/a	—N/a
XHJM-FM	88.1 FM	Guadalupe	Radio Contenidos, S.A. de C.V.	Globo	Romantic
XHWAG-FM	88.5 FM	Monterrey	Cadena Radiodifusora Mexicana, S.A. de C.V.	Los 40	Contemporary hit radio
XHMON-FM	89.3 FM	Guadalupe	Transmisora Regional Radio Fórmula, S.A. de C.V.	Radio Fórmula	News/talk
XHCPFQ-FM	89.5 FM	Sabinas Hidalgo	Gobierno del Estado de Nuevo León	Vive FM	Public radio
XHUNL-FM	89.7 FM	San Nicolás de los Garza	Universidad Autónoma de Nuevo León	Radio Uni	University radio
XHCHL-FM	90.1 FM	Los Ramones	Frecuencia Modulada Monterrey, S.A. de C.V.	La Ranchera de Monterrey	Regional Mexican
XHUDEM-FM	90.5 FM	San Pedro Garza García	Universidad de Monterrey	Radio UDEM	University radio
XHOK-FM	90.9 FM	Guadalupe	Radio XEOK, S. de R.L. de C.V.	W Radio	News/talk and English oldies
XHMTM-FM	91.3 FM	Montemorelos	José Armando de la Cruz Rodríguez	Pa' La Raza 91.3	Christian
XHXL-FM	91.7 FM	Monterrey	Profesionales de la Radio, S.A. de C.V.	91.7 Premier	Spanish classic hits
XHGBO-FM	92.1 FM	General Bravo	Notigramex, S.A. de C.V.	ABC Deportes	Sports talk
XHSRO-FM	92.5 FM	Monterrey	Stereorey México, S.A.	La Mejor FM	Regional Mexican
XHERG-FM	92.9 FM	Ojo de Agua	Radio Triunfos, S.A. de C.V.	RG La Deportiva	Sports talk
XHCPCK-FM	93.1 FM	Mier y Noriega	Gobierno del Estado de Nuevo León	—N/a	—N/a
XHCPCJ-FM	93.3 FM	General Zaragoza	Gobierno del Estado de Nuevo León	—N/a	—N/a
XHQQ-FM	93.3 FM	Monterrey	Radio Emisora XHSP-FM, S.A. de C.V.	Banda 93.3	Regional Mexican
XHCPFR-FM	93.7 FM	Galeana	Gobierno del Estado de Nuevo León	Vive FM	Public radio
XET-FM	94.1 FM	Monterrey	Radio Triunfos, S.A. de C.V.	La Caliente	Regional Mexican
XHTEC-FM	94.9 FM	Monterrey	Instituto Tecnológico y de Estudios Superiores de Monterrey	Tec Sounds Radio	University radio
XHLPZ-FM	95.3 FM	Lampazos	Organización Radiofónica del Norte, S.A. de C.V.	La Traviesa de Anáhuac	Regional Mexican
XHLRS-FM	95.3 FM	Linares	Radio Informativa, S.A. de C.V.	La Lupe	Spanisha dult hits
XHRK-FM	95.7 FM	Monterrey	Notigramex, S.A. de C.V.	La Sabrosita	Regional Mexican
XHMSN-FM	96.5 FM	Cadereyta	Dominio Radio, S.A. de C.V.	Dominio FM	News/talk
XHARR-FM	96.5 FM	Dr. Arroyo	Gobierno del Estado de Nuevo León	Vive FM	Public radio
XHPEDX-FM	96.9 FM	Linares	Delia Rodriguez Arreola	Radio La Siembra	Christian
XHSR-FM	97.3 FM	Monterrey	Stereorey México, S.A.	Exa FM	Contemporary hit radio
XHCPFS-FM	97.7 FM	Montemorelos	Gobierno del Estado de Nuevo León	Vive FM	Public radio
XHESH-FM	97.7 FM	Sabinas Hidalgo	Radiodifusoras Independientes, S.A. de C.V.	Radio Sabinas	Regional Mexican
XHRL-FM	98.1 FM	Monterrey	Radio Laredo, S.A. de C.V.	Génesis 98.1	Pop
XHTYL-FM	98.5 FM	Monterrey	Por la Igualdad Social, A.C.	Radio Tierra y Libertad	Community radio
XHJD-FM	98.9 FM	Monterrey	Radio Informativa, S.A. de C.V.	D99	English contemporary hit radio
XHSP-FM	99.7 FM	Monterrey	GA Radiocomunicaciones, S.A. de C.V.	Heraldo Radio	News/talk
XHPEFB-FM	100.1 FM	Los Ramones	Valores y Tradiciones de Mi Tierra, A.C.		
XHCPFP-FM	100.7 FM	Cerralvo	Gobierno del Estado de Nuevo León	La Nueva Radio 28	Public radio
XHERN-FM	100.9 FM	Montemorelos	Radio Televisora del Valle, S.A.	Radio Naranjera	Regional Mexican
XHSBH-FM	100.9 FM	Sabinas Hidalgo	Profesionales de la Radio, S.A. de C.V.	La Sabrosita	Regional Mexican
XHCPCI-FM	101.3 FM	Aramberri	Gobierno del Estado de Nuevo León	—N/a	—N/a
XHAW-FM	101.3 FM	Monterrey	Radio Informativa, S.A. de C.V.	La Gran AW	Spanish oldies and news/talk
XHQI-FM	102.1 FM	Monterrey	Gobierno del Estado de Nuevo León	Opus 102	Classical music
XHMG-FM	102.9 FM	Monterrey	Notigramex, S.A. de C.V.	Digital 102.9	Contemporary hit radio
XHCPFO-FM	103.3 FM	Anáhuac	Gobierno del Estado de Nuevo León	Vive FM	Public radio
XHNAR-FM	103.3 FM	Linares	Gobierno del Estado de Nuevo León	Vive FM	Public radio
XHTKR-FM	103.7 FM	Monterrey	La Voz de Linares, S.A.	La Ke Buena	Regional Mexican
XHCSDO-FM	104.1 FM	Linares	RYTSM, A.C.	—N/a	—N/a
XHMF-FM	104.5 FM	Monterrey	XHMF-FM, S.A. de C.V.	KY 104.5	Pop
XHLN-FM	104.9 FM	Linares	Radio Centinela, S.A. de C.V.	La Lupe	Spanish adult hits
XHLUPE-FM	105.3 FM	Monterrey	Radio Informativa, S.A. de C.V.	La Lupe	Spanish adult hits
XHR-FM	105.7 FM	Linares	La Voz de Linares, S.A.	La Caliente	Regional Mexican
XHITS-FM	106.1 FM	Monterrey	Radio Informativa, S.A. de C.V.	Hits FM	Contemporary hit radio
XHPJ-FM	106.9 FM	Monterrey	Radio Triunfos, S.A. de C.V.	Classic	English classic hits
XHMN-FM	107.7 FM	Monterrey	GIM Televisión Nacional, S.A. de C.V.	Imagen Radio	News/talk

== Defunct stations ==
- XEMN-AM 600, Monterrey
- XECSAG-AM 1390, San Nicolás de los Garza
- XEH-AM 1420, Monterrey
- XEQI-AM 1510, Monterrey
