= XET =

XET may refer to:

- XET-AM 990 in Monterrey, Nuevo León, now owned by Grupo Multimedios Estrella de Oro and known as "La T Grande"
- XET-FM 94.1 in Monterrey, Nuevo León
- XET-TDT (channel 31, virtual 6) in Monterrey, Nuevo León, now owned by Televisa
- Xyloglucan endo-transglycosylase, an enzyme involved in plant cell wall structure
