= XHFW =

XHFW may refer to:

- XHFW-FM, a radio station (88.5 FM) in Tampico, Tamaulipas, Mexico
- XHFW-TDT, a television station (channel 26, virtual 10) in Tampico, Tamaulipas, Mexico
