= XETAM =

XETAM may refer to:

- 640 XETAM-AM Ciudad Victoria, Tamaulipas, known as "La Poderosa"
- 990 XET-AM San Nicolás de los Garza, Nuevo León, near Monterrey, and known as "La T Grande"
