= XHAHC-FM =

Radio station in Chihuahua City, Chihuahua, Mexico

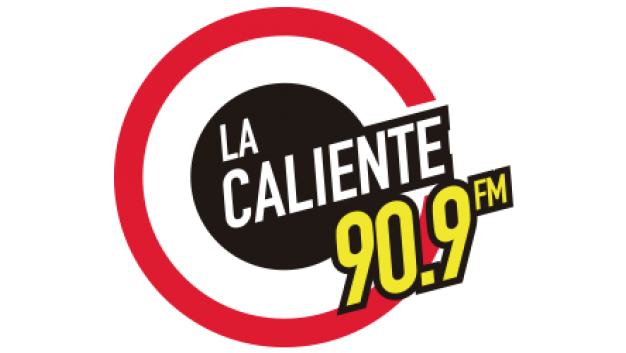
- Chihuahua City, Chihuahua; Mexico
- Frequency: 90.9 FM
- Branding: La Caliente

Programming
- Format: Grupera

Ownership
- Owner: Multimedios Radio; (La Voz de Linares, S.A. de C.V.)
- Sister stations: XHCHH-FM, XHHEM-FM, XHCHA-FM

History
- First air date: 1988 (concession)
- Call sign meaning: Chihuahua, Chihuahua

Technical information
- Licensing authority: CRT
- Class: C
- ERP: 50,000 watts
- HAAT: 661.7 m (2,171 ft)

Links
- Webcast: Listen live
- Website: mmradio.com

XHAHC-FM is a radio station in Chihuahua City, Chihuahua, Mexico. Broadcasting on 90.9 FM, XHAHC is owned by Multimedios Radio and carries a grupera format known as La Caliente.

== History ==
XHAHC received its concession on December 26, 1988. The original concessionaire was Enrigue Regules Uriegas, a Monterrey businessman connected to Grupo Multimedios. XHAHC was Multimedios's first radio station in Chihuahua.
