= XHTAM =

XHTAM may refer to:

- XHTAM-FM 96.1 Ciudad Victoria, Tamaulipas, a simulcast of XETAM-AM 640
- XHTAM-TDT 17 Reynosa-Matamoros, Tamaulipas, an affiliate of Canal de las Estrellas network
