= XEMN-AM =

Radio station in Monterrey, Nuevo León, Mexico

Defunct
- San Nicolás de los Garza-Monterrey, Nuevo León; Mexico
- Frequency: 600 AM

Ownership
- Owner: Grupo Radio Centro; (Radio Emisora XHSP-FM, S.A. de C.V.)
- Operator: Grupo Acustik
- Sister stations: XESTN-AM, XEH-AM, XHQQ-FM

History
- First air date: March 4, 1955 (concession)
- Call sign meaning: Monterrey, Nuevo León

Technical information
- Class: C
- Power: 1,000 watts day, 500 watts night

XEMN-AM was a radio station on 600 AM in Monterrey, Nuevo León, Mexico. It was last owned by Grupo Radio Centro and programmed by Grupo Acustik.

== History ==
XEMN received its concession on March 4, 1955. It was owned by Mario Quintanilla García until 1973.

In 2015, Emisoras Incorporadas de Monterrey was replaced by Radio Emisora XHSP-FM as the concessionaire as part of a restructuring of the stations then owned by Grupo Radio México. GRM merged with corporate cousin Grupo Radio Centro in 2016.

On September 2, 2019, La Regiomontana left the air after 52 years; it changed to Acustik Radio with a regional Mexican format. That same day, Acustik began programming two other former Radio Centro AM stations, XEUNO-AM in Guadalajara and XEJP-AM in Mexico City.

The concession of XEMN-AM expired without renewal, and the station ceased broadcasting. Acustik later moved its programs to XEFB-AM 630, which Acustik then purchased from Grupo Radio Centro.
