= XHRCA-FM =

Radio station in Torreón, Coahuila and Gómez Palacio, Durango, Mexico

- Torreón, Coahuila/Gómez Palacio, Durango; Mexico
- Broadcast area: Comarca Lagunera
- Frequency: 102.7 MHz
- Branding: Ke Buena

Programming
- Format: Regional Mexican
- Affiliations: Radiópolis

Ownership
- Owner: Multimedios Radio; (Radio Informativa, S.A. de C.V.)
- Sister stations: XHTRR-FM, XHCTO-FM, XHWN-FM, XHETOR-FM

History
- First air date: April 2, 1952 (concession); 1994 (FM)
- Former call signs: XEOB-AM (1952–1965); XETAA-AM (1965–1998); XHTAA-FM (1994–1998); XERCA-AM (1998–2020)
- Former frequencies: 1490 kHz (1952–1966); 920 kHz (1966–2020)

Technical information
- Licensing authority: CRT
- Class: A
- ERP: 600 watts
- HAAT: 241.6 m (793 ft)
- Transmitter coordinates: 25°31′25.8″N 103°27′18.0″W (FM); 25°34′52.9″N 103°28′48.1″W (AM)

Links
- Webcast: Listen live
- Website: mmradio.com

XHRCA-FM is a radio station serving the Comarca Lagunera of Torreón, Coahuila and Gómez Palacio, Durango. Broadcasting on 102.7 FM, XHRCA is owned by Multimedios Radio and carries the Ke Buena national Regional Mexican format from Radiópolis.

== History ==
Logo as Planeta, used until 2019

Logo used until May 2022

Logo used until September 2023

The concession for XERCA-AM was awarded in April 1952 to Radio Torreón, S.A. The station was known as XEOB-AM—the second station to use the call letters in the Comarca Lagunera, after a previous station in Gómez Palacio—and operated on 1490 kHz. The original concessionaire was Clemente Serna Martínez, founder of Radio Programas de México. The station changed its call letters to XETAA-AM in 1965, complementing its sister stations XETB and XETC, and was moved down the dial to 920 kHz in 1966.

In 1992, XETAA was transferred to Promotora Radiofónica de la Laguna. Two years later, it became an AM-FM combo, one of 80 authorized at the time, with the sign-on of XHTAA-FM on 102.7. In 1998, the callsigns were changed to XERCA-AM and XHRCA-FM (the latter previously used by Mexico City station XHFAJ-FM). In 2015, XHRCA and 24 other radio stations were folded into Grupo Radio Centro, a business owned by the same family as Grupo Radio México.

On October 29, 2019, Multimedios Radio assumed operational control of XHRCA and relaunched it as FM Tú with an urban format, similar to XHFMTU-FM in Monterrey, Nuevo León. On January 8, 2020, the station presented the Federal Telecommunications Institute with the surrender of its 5,000-watt AM facility in Gómez Palacio, remaining on FM only. The station was relaunched with the Ke Buena Regional Mexican music franchise format on September 17, 2023, at the same time as XHFMTU.
