= XHFW-TDT =

TV station in Tampico, Tamaulipas, Mexico

- Tampico, Tamaulipas; Mexico
- Channels: Digital: 26 (UHF); Virtual: 10
- Branding: Canal 10.1, La Imagen del Puerto

Ownership
- Owner: Grupo Flores; (Flores y Flores, S. en N.C. de C.V.)

History
- First air date: March 8, 1971
- Former channel numbers: 9 (analog VHF and digital virtual, 1971–2016)
- Call sign meaning: Derived from former sister XEFW-AM (now XHFW-FM)

Technical information
- Licensing authority: CRT
- ERP: 50 kW
- Transmitter coordinates: 22°15′03″N 97°51′43″W

Links
- Webcast: Live Channel
- Website: www.diezpuntounotam.com

XHFW-TDT is an independent television station in Tampico, Tamaulipas, Mexico. It is owned by Grupo Flores. Broadcasts start at 6:30 am and continue to 11:00 pm daily.

== History ==
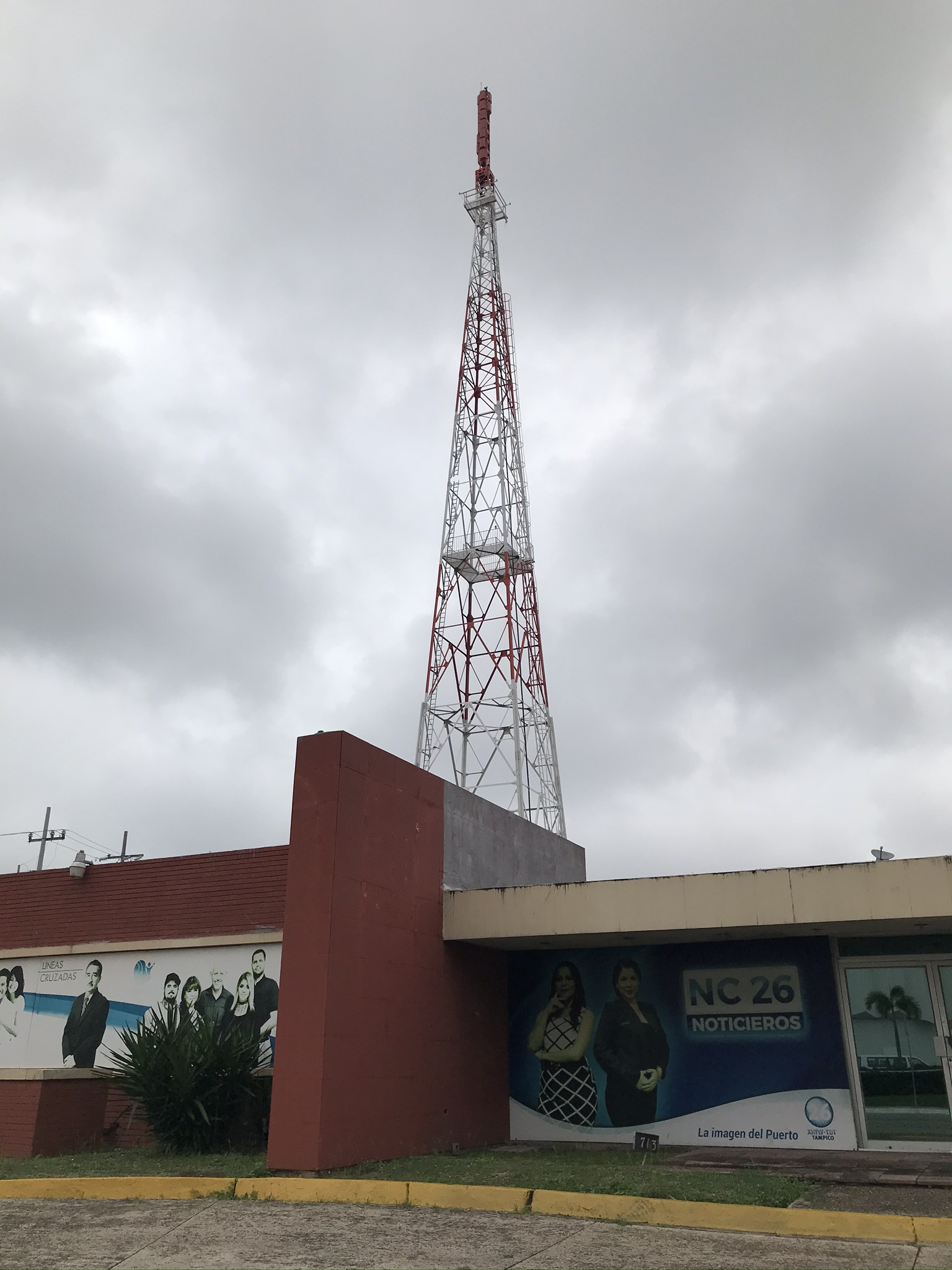
The XHFW-TDT tower on Av. Ejército Mexicano in Tampico

XHFW came to air on analog channel 9 on March 8, 1971; the inaugural program on that first day featured the Fight of the Century boxing match. The station was owned by the Flores family alongside two AM radio stations, XEFW-AM 810 and XETW-AM 860; the company started a third station, XHON-FM, in 1980. The station aired programming from Mexico City stations, first from Televisión Independiente de México and then from Televisa's Canal 5 after TIM merged with Telesistema Mexicano.

It signed on in digital in 2015. After shutting off its analog transmitter on December 31 of that year, the station began branding as channel 26, its physical channel number, but the next year, it was assigned virtual channel 10 and began using it, though the station continued to brand as channel 26 under the Flores family until 2021.

XHFW formerly broadcast Nu9ve programming until December 31, 2019; on January 1, 2020, Nu9ve moved to a subchannel of Televisa-owned XHTPZ-TDT, using virtual channel 9.

=== 2021 relaunches ===
On January 11, 2021, operation of XHFW was transferred to a new group headed by Martín Flores Echavarría (no relation), most programs canceled, and the station relaunched as "Canal 10.1, El Poder de tu Imagen". The new station will be affiliated with Heraldo TV, airing several national programs, along with a new lineup of locally produced shows. The move came two months after the IFT authorized on November 18 the inclusion of a second subchannel on the station, which is to be known as City Channel and programmed by VOIP Comunicación Digital, S.A. de C.V.

However, the ten-year deal lasted just ten months before being broken in a dispute over renewal fees. The Flores family resumed control, airing La Octava for two months until resuming local programming from its own facilities in December. The previous "10.1 Tampico" also continues on social media.

== Subchannels ==
XHFW currently is authorized to carry two subchannels:

Channel	Video	Aspect	Short name	Programming
10.1	1080i	16:9	XHFW	Main XHFW programming
10.2	480i	16:9	XHFW	Main XHFW programming
