= XHR =

XHR may refer to:

- Hernican language
- Xenia Hotels & Resorts
- XHR-FM, a radio station in Linares, Nuevo León, Mexico
- XMLHttpRequest, a JavaScript class for Ajax programming
