= XHCHH-FM (Chihuahua) =

Radio station in Chihuahua, Chihuahua, Mexico

D95 XHCHH-FM
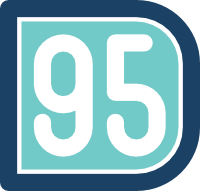
- Chihuahua City, Chihuahua; Mexico
- Frequency: 94.9 MHz
- Branding: D95

Programming
- Format: Top 40 (CHR)

Ownership
- Owner: Multimedios Radio; (Radio Informativa, S.A. de C.V.)
- Sister stations: XHAHC-FM, XHHEM-FM, XHCHA-FM

History
- First air date: November 22, 1994
- Call sign meaning: Chihuahua

Technical information
- Licensing authority: CRT
- Class: B
- ERP: 25,000 watts
- HAAT: 242.1 m (794 ft)

Links
- Website: www.mmradio.com/estaciones/d95-949-fm-chihuahua

XHCHH-FM is a radio station in Chihuahua, Chihuahua, Mexico. Broadcasting on 94.9 FM, XHCHH is owned by Multimedios Radio and carries a Top 40 (CHR) format known as D95.

== History ==
On June 5, 1992, the Secretariat of Communications and Transportation (SCT) published a series of declarations of availability of new FM radio stations in various Mexican cities, including 94.9 MHz in Chihuahua, a 50,000-watt station with call sign XHCHH-FM. On March 9, 1994, the SCT selected Comunicaciones Alco, S.A. de C.V., as the winning concessionaire from among 38 bidders. The station began broadcasting November 22 of that year under Multimedios Radio operation, with the concession being transferred to a subsidiary in 1998.

From 1996 to 2001, actor and comedian Omar Chaparro was one of the station's presenters, marking his first big break.
