= XHTPO-FM =

Radio station in Tampico, Tamaulipas

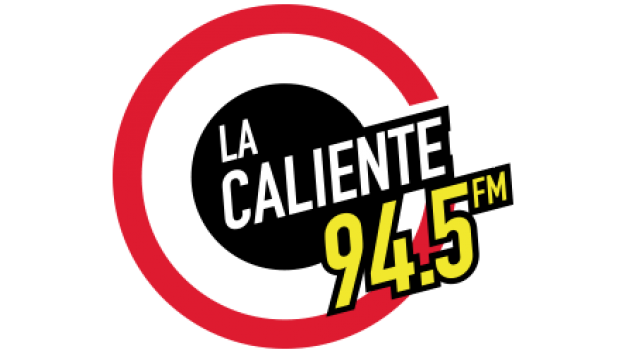
- Tampico, Tamaulipas; Mexico
- Frequency: 94.5 FM
- RDS: ESCUCHAS LA CALIENTE 94.5 FM ARTIST NAME SONG NAME
- Branding: La Caliente

Programming
- Format: Regional Mexican

Ownership
- Owner: Multimedios Radio; (Multimedios Radio, S.A. de C.V.)
- Sister stations: Radio: XHFW-FM; XHTW-FM; XHON-FM; TV: XHTAO-TDT;

History
- First air date: October 15, 1990 (concession)
- Call sign meaning: "Tampico"

Technical information
- Licensing authority: CRT
- Class: B
- ERP: 50 kW
- HAAT: 69.52 m (228.1 ft)

Links
- Webcast: listen live
- Website: Website official of Multimedios Radio

XHTPO-FM (branded as La Caliente) is a Mexican Spanish-language FM radio station that serves the Tampico, Tamaulipas, Mexico, market area.

== History ==
XHTPO received its concession on October 15, 1990. It was originally owned by Multimedios subsidiary Radio Diversión, S.A. de C.V.
