= XHWN-FM =

Radio station in Torreón, Coahuila, Mexico

- Gómez Palacio, Durango/Torreón, Coahuila; Mexico
- Broadcast area: Comarca Lagunera
- Frequency: 93.9 MHz
- Branding: Classic

Programming
- Format: English classic music

Ownership
- Owner: Multimedios Radio; (Radio Triunfos, S.A. de C.V.)
- Sister stations: XHTRR-FM, XHCTO-FM, XHETOR-FM, XHRCA-FM

History
- First air date: November 9, 1964 (concession)

Technical information
- Licensing authority: CRT
- Class: B1
- ERP: 600 watts
- HAAT: 246.6 m (809 ft)
- Transmitter coordinates: 25°31′29.26″N 103°27′19.76″W

Links
- Website: www.multimedios.com/radio/programas/radio-recuerdo-939-fm-torreon

XHWN-FM is a radio station on 93.9 FM in Torreón, Coahuila, Mexico. The station is owned by Multimedios Radio with the latter's the Telediario Radio news format. The transmitter is located atop Cerro de las Noas.

== History ==
Logo used until October 2, 2022.

XEWN-AM 1270 received its concession on November 9, 1964. The station was owned by Alejandro O. Stevenson and broadcast from Gómez Palacio, Durango.

The station was sold to Promotora Radiofónica de la Laguna in 2000 and migrated to FM in 2011.

In 2019, Multimedios Radio took control of the entire Radio Centro Torreón cluster; Radio Recuerdo, which had been on XHBP-FM 90.3, began simulcasting on the 93.9 frequency.

Logo used until January 1, 2026.

On October 3, 2022, XHWN switched to a news format as "Telediario Radio" based on the television newscast of XHOAH-TDT. On January 1, 2026, it switched to English music as Classic.
