= XHQC-FM =

Radio station in Saltillo, Coahuila, Mexico

- Saltillo, Coahuila; Mexico
- Frequency: 93.5 FM
- Branding: Stereo Saltillo

Programming
- Format: Pop

Ownership
- Owner: Multimedios Radio; (Radio Triunfos, S.A. de C.V.)
- Sister stations: XHDE-FM

History
- First air date: July 15, 1985 (concession)

Technical information
- Licensing authority: CRT
- Class: B1
- ERP: 15 kW
- HAAT: −67.5 m (−221 ft)

Links
- Webcast: Listen live
- Website: mmradio.com

XHQC-FM is a radio station on 93.5 FM in Saltillo, Coahuila, Mexico. The station is owned by Multimedios Radio and carries a pop format under the Stereo Saltillo name. It is similar to the Hits FM stations operated by the same group.

== History ==
XHQC received its first concession on July 15, 1985, making it Saltillo's second station on FM and first new FM station since 1968. The concession was held by Jorge Campo Rodríguez until 2000, but in actuality, it was the first station in Saltillo to be operated by Multimedios Radio.
