= XHGBO-FM =

Radio station in General Bravo, Nuevo León

Simulcast with XEFZ-AM 660 Monterrey
- General Bravo, Nuevo León; Mexico
- Broadcast area: General Bravo-Monterrey
- Frequency: 92.1 FM
- Branding: ABC Deportes

Programming
- Format: Sports talk

Ownership
- Owner: Grupo Radio Alegría; (Gramex Regiomontana, S.A. de C.V.)
- Sister stations: XHRK-FM, XHMG-FM, XHXL-FM, XEBJB-AM, XEFZ-AM, XEMR-AM, XEVB-AM, XENV-AM

History
- First air date: November 23, 1994 (concession)
- Call sign meaning: General BravO

Technical information
- Licensing authority: CRT
- Class: B
- ERP: 50 kW
- HAAT: 124.6 meters (409 ft)
- Transmitter coordinates: 25°48′17.7″N 99°09′09.8″W

Links
- Website: abcdeportes.mx

XHGBO-FM is a radio station on 92.1 FM in General Bravo, Nuevo León. Mexico. The station is owned by Grupo Radio Alegría and is known as ABC Deportes, simulcasting XEFZ-AM 660 in Monterrey. The transmitter is located in Conferín Arizpe at the outskirts of Monterrey.

== History ==
XHGBO received its concession on November 23, 1994. For most of its first 25 years, it broadcast as a local station aimed at General Bravo, with the La Sabrosita format also on XHRK-FM 95.7 Monterrey and XHSBH-FM 100.9 in Sabinas Hidalgo.

In 2017, GRA conducted a power increase that made the station a rimshot into Monterrey proper. At the same time, GRA closed local operations in General Bravo and made XHGBO a simulcast of its AM station XEBJB-AM 570. On January 4, 2021, coinciding with the launch of sports talk station ABC Deportes on XEFZ-AM 660, XHGBO switched simulcast partners.
