= XEIZ-AM =

Radio station in Monterrey

- Monterrey, Nuevo León; Mexico
- Frequency: 1230 kHz
- Branding: Radio Fórmula (Segunda Cadena)

Programming
- Format: News/talk

Ownership
- Owner: Radio Fórmula; (Transmisora Regional Radio Fórmula, S.A. de C.V.)
- Sister stations: XEACH-AM, XHMON-FM

History
- First air date: November 10, 1967 (concession)
- Former frequencies: 1240 kHz (to 2002)

Technical information
- Licensing authority: CRT
- Class: B
- Power: 10 kW day 1 kW night
- Transmitter coordinates: 25°40′15.3″N 100°11′07.1″W

Links
- Website: radioformulamonterrey.com

XEIZ-AM is a radio station on 1230 AM in Monterrey, Nuevo León. Mexico. It carries Radio Fórmula programming.

== History ==
XEIZ received its concession on November 10, 1967. Originally owned by Jesús Dionisio González González and Francisco Antonio González Sánchez of Multimedios Radio, XEIZ broadcast on 1310, then 1240 kHz with 1,000 watts during the day and 250 at night.

In 2000, González Sánchez became the sole concessionaire after Jesús died in 1997. XEIZ was then sold to Radio Fórmula. In 2002, Radio Fórmula was approved to move XEIZ from downtown Monterrey to the Guadalupe transmitter site already used by its other AM stations, XEACH-AM 770 and XEMON-AM 1370, and to shift its frequency to 1230 kHz.
