= XHDE-FM =

Radio station in Arteaga–Saltillo, Coahuila

- Arteaga, Coahuila, Mexico; Mexico
- Broadcast area: Saltillo
- Frequency: 105.7 FM
- Branding: La Lupe

Programming
- Format: Variety hits

Ownership
- Owner: Multimedios Radio; (Multimedios, S.A. de C.V.)
- Sister stations: XHQC-FM

History
- First air date: April 4, 1942 (concession)

Technical information
- Licensing authority: CRT
- Class: B1
- ERP: 25 kW
- HAAT: −87.7 m (−288 ft)
- Transmitter coordinates: 25°26′20″N 100°53′15″W

XHDE-FM is a radio station on 105.7 FM in Arteaga, Coahuila, Mexico. It is owned by Multimedios Radio, which known as La Lupe with a Variety hits format.

== History ==
XEDE-AM, originally on 1400 kHz, received its concession on April 4, 1942. It was Saltillo's second radio station, founded by Manuel Tamargo, Blas Narro and Ignacio Rodríguez and affiliated to Radio Programas de México. Initially known as La Voz de Coahuila (The Voice of Coahuila), the station was sold to businessman Enrique Martínez y Martínez. Eventually, it was sold to Alberto Jaubert, who would assemble a station cluster consisting of three radio stations and a TV station in Saltillo; by the 1970s, the concession was held by Radio Futurama, S.A. It later moved to 720 kHz and began broadcasting with 8 kW day and 250 watts night. Imagen acquired it in 2006.

In December 2011, XEDE was approved to migrate to FM as XHDE-FM 105.7.

On April 1, 2023, Multimedios Radio began operating the station and immediately installed its La Lupe format. That same day, Grupo Imagen began operating Multimedios-owned XHCCCT-FM 94.1 in Mérida, Yucatán, with its talk radio format.
