= XHAW-TDT =

Television station in Monterrey–Saltillo

- Monterrey, Nuevo León; Saltillo, Coahuila; Mexico
- Channels: Digital: 25 (UHF); Virtual: 6
- Branding: Multimedios Television; Canal Seis

Programming
- Subchannels: 6.1: Canal 6; for others, see § Subchannels

Ownership
- Owner: Grupo Firmas Globales; (Televisión Digital, S.A. de C.V.)
- Sister stations: Radio: XERG-AM; XENL-AM; XET-AM; XEAU-AM; XEAW-AM; XETKR-AM; XHERG-FM; XET-FM; XHJD-FM; XHAW-FM; XHTKR-FM; XHLUPE-FM; XHITS-FM; XHPJ-FM;

History
- First air date: February 24, 1968
- Former call signs: XHAW-TV (1968-2015)
- Former channel numbers: Analog: 12 (VHF; 1968–2015); Digital: 50 (UHF; to 2011); Virtual: 12 (2011–2018)
- Call sign meaning: Taken from XHAW-FM radio

Technical information
- Licensing authority: CRT
- ERP: 120 kW
- HAAT: 134.8 m (442 ft)
- Transmitter coordinates: 25°37′32.92″N 100°19′6.93″W
- Translator(s): RF 25 Saltillo, Coahuila.

Links
- Website: www.multimedios.tv

XHAW-TDT (channel 6) is a television station licensed to both Monterrey, Nuevo León and Saltillo, Coahuila, Mexico, as a flagship station of the Multimedios television network. The station is owned by Grupo Firmas Globales.

== Technical information ==
=== Subchannels ===
The station's digital signal is multiplexed:

Channel	Res.	Short name	Programming
6.1	1080i	XHAW	Canal 6
6.2	480i	XHAW	Milenio Televisión
6.3	480i	XHAW	RG La Deportiva TV
6.4	480i	XHAW	Popcorn Central

XHAW and sister station XHSAW broadcast in HDTV; XHSAW formerly shared virtual channel 12. XHSAW broadcasts on channels 12.1 through 12.4; XHAW broadcasts channels 6.1 and 6.2. 6.1 and 6.2 are the only channels available in Saltillo and Guadalupe/Juárez/Cadereyta, as there is no shadow XHSAW there. Even though XHAW broadcast on analog channel 11 in Saltillo, it used virtual channel 12 there even prior to 2016. On February 24, 2018 (the station's 50th anniversary date), the station began to use the channel 6 virtual channel along with most other Multimedios stations as part of the network's national expansion.

XHAW Saltillo broadcast on physical channel 51 because channel 25 was in use by analog XHSTC-TV there. It was relocated to channel 25 after the digital television transition.

=== Analog-to-digital conversion ===
On September 24, 2015, XHAW shut off its analog signals, both in Monterrey and Saltillo; its digital signals remained.
