= XELOVE-AM =

Radio station in Ciudad Juárez, Chihuahua, Mexico

XELOVE-AM, XHLOVE-FM
- Ciudad Juárez (AM) and El Porvenir, Chihuahua (FM); Mexico
- Frequencies: 640 AM, 104.7 FM
- Branding: La Lupe

Programming
- Format: Variety Hits

Ownership
- Owner: Multimedios Radio; (Radio Informativa, S.A. de C.V.)

History
- First air date: June 22, 1992 (AM); September 28, 2024 (FM)
- Former call signs: XEJUA-AM (1992–2023)
- Call sign meaning: "Love"

Technical information
- Licensing authority: CRT
- Class: B (AM); B1 (FM)
- Power: (AM) 5,000 watts days only
- ERP: (FM) 25,000 watts
- HAAT: (FM) 145 metres (476 ft)
- Transmitter coordinates: 31°23′54.35″N 106°06′56.46″W

Links
- Webcast: Listen live
- Website: mmradio.com

XELOVE-AM (640 AM) is a radio station in Ciudad Juárez, Chihuahua, Mexico. It is owned by Multimedios Radio and carries its La Lupe variety hits format. The programming on XELOVE-AM is also simulcast on Ciudad Juárez–market FM radio station XHLOVE-FM 104.7, authorized to serve the community of El Porvenir.

By day, XELOVE is powered at 5,000 watts using a directional antenna. Because AM 640 is an American clear-channel frequency reserved for 50,000-watt, Class A KFI in Los Angeles, XELOVE is a daytimer; it must leave the air between sunset and sunrise to avoid interfering with KFI. XHLOVE-FM is a rimshot broadcasting to Ciudad Juárez from a transmitter site 51 kilometers (32 mi) from the city center.

== History ==
Logo with BM Radio

XEJUA-AM received its concession on June 22, 1992. It was owned by Multimedios executive Francisco Antonio González Sánchez and was known as Súper Estelar, Estéreo Recuerdo, and Milenio Radio.

For a time in the mid-2010s, XEJUA was operated by Chihuahua broadcaster Grupo BM Radio with an all-news radio format as BM Noticias and later BM Radio 640. Multimedios began operating the station again in 2017 and first broadcast its La Caliente Regional Mexican format before flipping the station to La Lupe in 2020.

XEJUA-AM changed call signs to XELOVE-AM on May 31, 2023. 20 days earlier, the IFT had previously authorized the Multimedios-owned station XHCCAL-FM at El Porvenir, obtained in the IFT-8 station auction, to change its call sign to XHLOVE-FM, as well as its technical parameters. It began broadcasting on September 28, 2024, as a simulcast of XELOVE-AM.

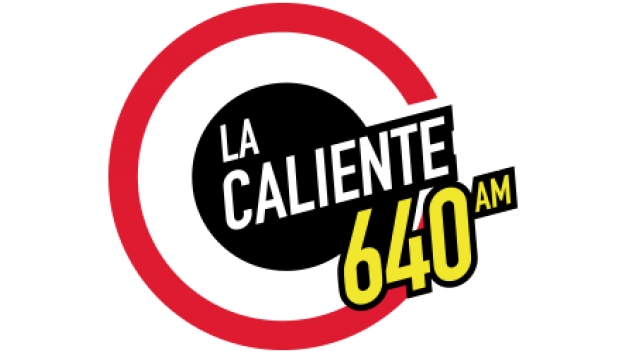
Logo as La Caliente
