= WCRV =

- Collierville, Tennessee; United States
- Broadcast area: Memphis metropolitan area
- Frequency: 640 kHz
- Branding: Bott Radio Network

Programming
- Format: Christian talk and teaching
- Network: Bott Radio Network

Ownership
- Owner: Bott Broadcasting Company/Tennessee

History
- First air date: October 1, 1966
- Former call signs: WPIP (1966–1971); WMSO (1971–1986)
- Former frequencies: 1590 kHz (1966–1981)
- Call sign meaning: Collierville

Technical information
- Licensing authority: FCC
- Facility ID: 6486
- Class: B
- Power: 50,000 watts (day); 480 watts (night)
- Transmitter coordinates: 34°59′35″N 89°53′58″W
- Translator: 93.7 W229CT (Memphis); 100.7 W264CO (Marion)

Links
- Public license information: Public file; LMS
- Webcast: Listen live
- Website: bottradionetwork.com/station/640-am-memphis-tn/

WCRV (640 AM) is a broadcast radio station in the United States. Licensed to Collierville, Tennessee, the station broadcasts a Christian talk and teaching format to the Memphis metropolitan area with programming from the Bott Radio Network.

Founded as WPIP, the station first broadcast in 1966; its call sign changed to WMSO in 1971. Throughout the early 1970s, WPIP and WMSO had a country music format, before WMSO changed to gospel music in 1976. Bott Broadcasting purchased WMSO in 1986, then changed its call sign to the current WCRV.

== History ==
=== As WPIP and WMSO (1966–1986) ===
Founded by the Piper Broadcasting Company, the station debuted on October 1, 1966, on the 1590 kHz frequency with call sign WPIP. Having granted a construction permit in 1963, the Federal Communications Commission officially licensed WPIP on December 12, 1966. Broadcasting with 500 watts of power, WPIP was licensed to broadcast only during daytime hours. WPIP was the first radio station licensed to Collierville.

WPIP was purchased by Albert L. Crain for $55,000 in 1970. The FCC approved the broadcast license transfer on August 11. Under Crain, WPIP initially had a country music format.

In February 1971, WPIP became an affiliate of ABC's American Entertainment Network. Crain then changed the call sign from WPIP to WMSO effective October 26, 1971. Crain said WMSO was a reference to the Mid-South or "Memphis Sound". Memphis Press-Scimitar entertainment columnist Mary Ann Lee observed that WMSO's music playlist focused on "upper country music", such as Johnny Cash and Lynn Anderson.

By 1975, WMSO's format expanded to include R&B and gospel music. Crain changed the format to gospel music full time in January 1976, with an "All Christian Radio" brand.

Beginning May 6, 1981, WMSO moved from 1590 kHz to 640 kHz and increased broadcasting power to 1 kW.

=== As WCRV (1986–present) ===
After 15 years, Crain sold WMSO in 1986. Bott Broadcasting bought WMSO from Crain's company Victory Broadcasting for $600,000. Bott changed the call sign to the present WCRV on December 15, 1986. Following the call sign change was a power upgrade, 10 kW daytime and nighttime broadcasting for the first time, at 250 watts.

By 1995, WCRV upgraded its daytime broadcasting power to 50 kW and was described by The Commercial Appeal as "not only the most powerful AM station in Memphis but the most powerful Christian talk radio station in the nation."

In the summer 2002 Arbitron survey, WCRV ranked 20th out of 25 Memphis stations, with a 1.5 percent share.

== Technical information ==
With a transmitter at Pleasant Hill and State Line roads in Olive Branch, Mississippi, less than a mile from the Tennessee border, WCRV broadcasts with 50 kilowatts during daytime hours and 480 watts at night. As AM 640 is a clear-channel frequency, non-class A AM stations on that frequency must reduce power at night. WCRV has two FM translators, 93.7 W229CT in Memphis, Tennessee, and 100.7 W264CO in Marion, Arkansas.
