= XHSBH-FM =

Radio station in Sabinas Hidalgo, Nuevo León

Simulcast of XHMG-FM 102.9 Monterrey
- Sabinas Hidalgo, Nuevo León; Mexico
- Frequency: 100.9 FM
- Branding: Digital 102.9

Programming
- Format: Pop

Ownership
- Owner: Grupo Radio Alegría; (Profesionales de la Radio, S.A. de C.V.)
- Sister stations: XHESH-FM

History
- First air date: November 30, 1994 (concession)
- Call sign meaning: "Sabinas Hidalgo"

Technical information
- Licensing authority: CRT
- Class: A
- ERP: 2.6 kW
- HAAT: 100 m (330 ft)

Links
- Website: www.gruporadioalegria.mx

XHSBH-FM is a radio station on 100.9 FM in Sabinas Hidalgo, Nuevo León. Mexico. The station is owned by Grupo Radio Alegría and is known as Digital 102.9, simulcasting sister station XHMG-FM in Monterrey.

== History ==
XHSBH received its concession on November 30, 1994. The original concessionaire was Gonzalo Estrada Cruz, who founded GRA and its associated ABC newspaper.

Long known as La Sabrosita, in line with GRA's XHRK-FM 95.7 in Monterrey, the station began simulcasting pop outlet XHMG-FM 102.9 in 2020.
