= XHCTC-FM =

Radio station in Ciudad Cuauhtémoc, Chihuahua, Mexico

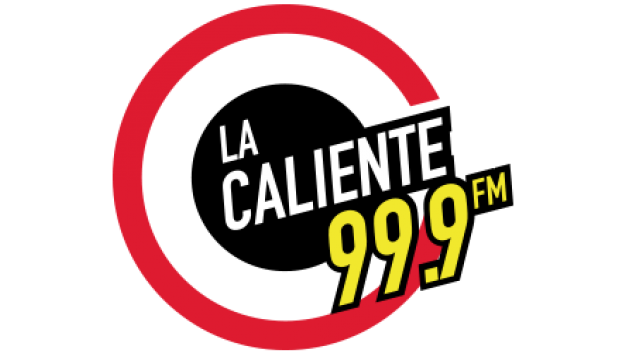
- Ciudad Cuauhtémoc, Chihuahua; Mexico
- Frequency: 99.9 FM
- Branding: La Caliente

Programming
- Format: Regional Mexican

Ownership
- Owner: Multimedios Radio; (La Voz de Linares, S.A.)
- Sister stations: XHPCCC-FM

History
- First air date: June 7, 1990 (concession)
- Call sign meaning: "Cuauhtémoc"

Technical information
- Licensing authority: CRT
- Class: B
- ERP: 30 kW
- HAAT: 128.2 m (421 ft)
- Transmitter coordinates: 28°24′07.97″N 106°51′22.15″W

Links
- Webcast: Listen live
- Website: mmradio.com

XHCTC-FM is a radio station on 99.9 FM in Ciudad Cuauhtémoc, Chihuahua, Mexico. The station is owned by Multimedios Radio and known as La Caliente with a regional Mexican format.

== History ==
XHCTC received its concession on June 7, 1990. It was originally owned by Enrique Regules Uriegas.

In 2019, the station was approved to reduce its effective radiated power to 30 kW.
