= XHTAO-TDT =

Television station in Tampico

- Tampico, Tamaulipas; Mexico
- Channels: Digital: 14 (UHF); Virtual: 6
- Branding: Multimedios

Programming
- Affiliations: Multimedios Television

Ownership
- Owner: Grupo Multimedios; (Multimedios Televisión, S.A. de C.V.)
- Sister stations: Radio: XHFW-FM; XHTPO-FM; XHTW-FM; XHON-FM;

History
- Founded: August 10, 1990 (concession); August 23, 1993 (transmissions)
- Former channel numbers: Analog: 6 (VHF, 1990–2015); Digital: 47 (UHF, 2012–2018); Virtual: 6 (2012–2016, 2018–present); 12 (2016–2018)
- Call sign meaning: "Tampico"

Technical information
- Licensing authority: CRT
- ERP: 50 kW
- Transmitter coordinates: 22°19′38″N 97°51′54″W

Links
- Website: Multimedios TV

XHTAO-TDT (channel 6) is a Multimedios Television affiliate in Tampico, Tamaulipas, Mexico.

Before the analog shutdown, XHTAO's audio signal could be heard at 87.7 MHz on FM radios, though at a slightly lower volume than other FM stations, due to technical reasons. After the analog shutdown, this couldn't be possible due to the nature of digital TV.

== Programming ==
XHTAO broadcasts a large amount of local programming, including local editions of Multimedios's flagship news program Telediario.

The digital station began operations on August 1, 2012.

XHTAO has one digital repeater, in Gustavo Garmendia, San Luis Potosí.

In March 2018, in order to facilitate the repacking of TV services out of the 600 MHz band (channels 38-51), XHTAO was assigned channel 14 for continued digital operations. The change was carried out in September 2018.

== Subchannels ==
The station's digital signal is multiplexed:

Channel	Res.	Short name	Programming
6.1	720p	XHTAO 1	Main XHTAO programming
6.2	480i	XHTAO 2	Milenio Televisión
6.3	480i	XHTAO 3	City Channel
6.4	480i	XHTAO 4	Popcorn Central
