= XHPENS-FM =

Radio station in Ensenada, Baja California, Mexico

- Ensenada, Baja California; Mexico
- Frequency: 94.7 MHz (HD Radio)
- Branding: La Lupe

Programming
- Format: Spanish adult hits

Ownership
- Owner: Multimedios Radio; (Radio Informativa, S.A. de C.V.)
- Sister stations: XHHC-FM

History
- First air date: May 3, 2018
- Call sign meaning: Ensenada

Technical information
- Licensing authority: CRT
- Class: A
- ERP: 3 kW
- HAAT: 72.3 m (237 ft)

Links
- Webcast: Listen live
- Website: mmradio.com

XHPENS-FM is a radio station on 94.7 FM in Ensenada, Baja California, Mexico. It is owned by Multimedios Radio and carries its La Lupe Spanish adult hits format.

== History ==
XHPENS was awarded in the IFT-4 radio auction of 2017 and came to air May 4, 2018, taking over the La Caliente grupera format from XHHC-FM 92.1. The original plan was to have the station carry the Classic format, but that changed prior to signing on.

The station switched formats with XHHC and became La Lupe on November 4, 2020.
