= XHPMAZ-FM =

Radio station in Mazatlán, Sinaloa, Mexico

- Mazatlán, Sinaloa; Mexico
- Frequency: 92.1 MHz (HD Radio)
- Branding: La Lupe

Programming
- Format: Variety hits

Ownership
- Owner: Multimedios Radio; (Radio Informativa, S.A. de C.V.)

History
- First air date: 2017
- Call sign meaning: Mazatlán

Technical information
- Licensing authority: CRT
- Class: B1
- ERP: 25 kW
- HAAT: 76.4 m (251 ft)
- Transmitter coordinates: 23°12′05.75″N 106°25′35.04″W

Links
- Webcast: Listen live
- Website: mmradio.com

XHPMAZ-FM is a radio station on 92.1 FM in Mazatlán, Sinaloa, Mexico. It is owned by Multimedios Radio and carries its La Lupe Spanish variety hits format.

== History ==
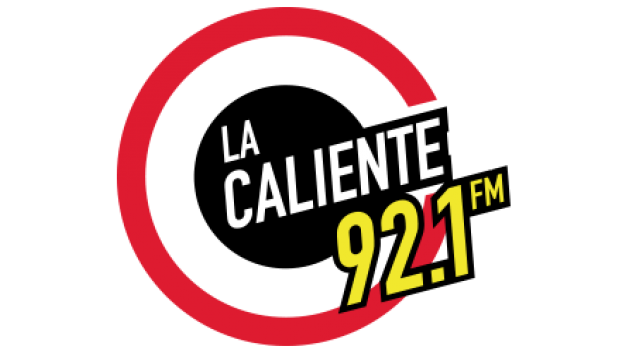
Logo as La Caliente 92.1 from 2017-2020

XHPMAZ was awarded in the IFT-4 radio auction of 2017 and came to air that fall airing its La Caliente grupera format. At 55.5 million pesos, it was the second-most expensive station awarded in the IFT-4 radio station auction; only Cancún's XHPBCQ-FM went for more money.

On June 1, 2020, Multimedios flipped the formats of XHPMAZ and XHLRS-FM in Ciudad Victoria to Spanish adult hits in its La Lupe format.
