= XHCTO-FM =

Radio station in Torreón, Coahuila

- Torreón, Coahuila; Mexico
- Broadcast area: Comarca Lagunera
- Frequency: 93.1 MHz
- Branding: Hits FM

Programming
- Format: Pop

Ownership
- Owner: Multimedios Radio; (Multimedios Radio, S.A. de C.V.)
- Sister stations: XHTRR-FM, XHWN-FM, XHETOR-FM, XHRCA-FM

History
- First air date: April 21, 1961 (concession)
- Call sign meaning: Coahuila Torreón

Technical information
- Licensing authority: CRT
- Class: B1
- ERP: 25 kW
- HAAT: 29.43 m (96.6 ft)

Links
- Website: www.mmradio.com/hitsfm931/

XHCTO-FM is a radio station on 93.1 FM in Torreón, Coahuila. The station is owned by Multimedios Radio and carries a pop format known as Hits FM.

== History ==
XHCTO received its concession on May 19, 1992. It was owned by Sintonía Fina, S.A. de C.V., and licensed across the state line to Gómez Palacio, Durango. In 2001, the concession was transferred to Multimedios Radio.
