= XHETOR-FM =

Radio station in Torreón, Coahuila, Mexico

- Matamoros-Torreón, Coahuila; Mexico
- Broadcast area: Comarca Lagunera
- Frequency: 99.9 FM
- Branding: La Lupe

Programming
- Format: Variety hits

Ownership
- Owner: Multimedios Radio; (Radio Informativa, S.A. de C.V.)
- Sister stations: XHTRR-FM, XHCTO-FM, XHWN-FM, XHRCA-FM

History
- First air date: May 14, 1966 (concession)
- Former frequencies: 670 kHz, 107.5 MHz (2011–2019)
- Call sign meaning: TORreón (E added during AM-FM migration)

Technical information
- Licensing authority: CRT
- Class: B1
- ERP: 600 watts
- HAAT: 244.1 meters (801 ft)
- Transmitter coordinates: 25°31′29.26″N 103°27′19.76″W

Links
- Webcast: Listen live
- Website: mmradio.com

XHETOR-FM is a radio station on 99.9 FM in Torreón, Coahuila, Mexico. The station is owned by Multimedios Radio with the latter's La Lupe variety hits format.

== History ==
XETOR-AM 670 received its concession on May 14, 1966, broadcasting from Matamoros, Coahuila. It was owned by La Voz de Coahuila, S.A. and broadcast as a 1 kW daytimer.

In 1997, it was sold to Publicidad Radiofónica de la Laguna, which began operating the station at night.

In 2011, it migrated to FM on 107.5 MHz. As part of its 2017 concession renewal, XHETOR-FM moved to 99.9 MHz on October 3, 2019, in order to clear 106-108 MHz as much as possible for community and indigenous radio stations.

On January 15, 2018, XHETOR-FM was approved to relocate its transmitter from Matamoros to atop Cerro de las Noas in Torreón, requiring an equivalent power reduction to 600 watts ERP.

In 2019, Multimedios Radio took control of the entire Radio Centro Torreón cluster; La Lupe, which had been on XHGZ-FM 99.5, moved to the 99.9 frequency.
