= XHHEM-FM =

Radio station in Chihuahua, Chihuahua, Mexico

- Chihuahua, Chihuahua; Mexico
- Broadcast area: Chihuahua, Chihuahua
- Frequency: 103.7 MHz
- Branding: La Mejor FM

Programming
- Format: Regional Mexican
- Affiliations: MVS Radio

Ownership
- Owner: GRD Multimedia; (Radio Chihuahua, S.A.)
- Sister stations: XHLO-FM

History
- First air date: 1939; 2011 (on FM)
- Call sign meaning: Derived from XEM-AM

Technical information
- Licensing authority: CRT
- Class: B1
- ERP: 25,000 watts
- HAAT: 36.2 m (119 ft)
- Transmitter coordinates: 28°37′56″N 106°3′42″W

XHHEM-FM is a radio station in Chihuahua, Chihuahua, Mexico. Broadcasting on 103.7 FM, XHHEM is owned by GRD Multimedia and carries the La Mejor FM national format from MVS Radio.

== History ==
XHHEM began in 1939 as XEM-AM, owned by Pedro Meneses, Jr. The station originally broadcast at 1390 kHz. It was then sold to Mexican Broadcasting Co., S.A. and moved to 850; in 1972, the concession was transferred to Radio Chihuahua, S.A. Until the 1990s, it was a daytimer.

In the 1980s the station was Radio Éxitos; in the 1990s and early 2000s it was known as Radio Renacimiento with Christian music. In 2010, XEM was leased to Multimedios Radio to become an outlet for Milenio Radio.

In 2011, XEM received approval to migrate to FM. Its call sign was heavily modified, as there are already stations XHM-FM, XHEM-FM and XHEEM-FM. 850 AM shut off in 2012.

In August 2014, the Milenio Radio format was dropped for the Classic FM format, similar to XHPJ-FM in Monterrey.

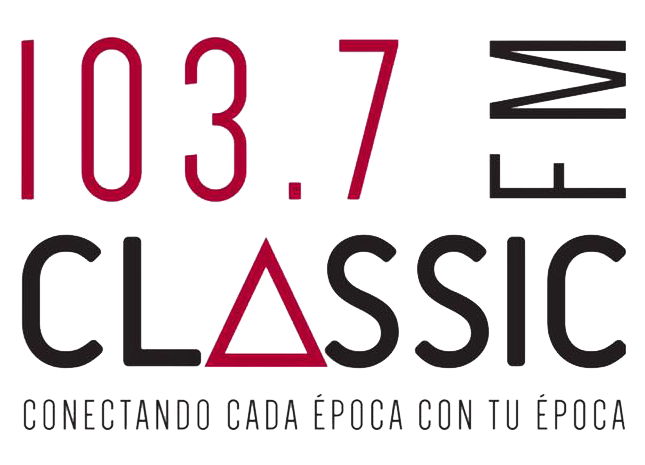
Classic FM logo (until 2020).

On January 17, 2020, Multimedios Radio flipped XHCHA-FM to its La Lupe variety hits format, and Hits FM moved to XHHEM-FM, leading to the end of Classic.

In March 2026, Multimedios ended operation of station, and the station became the Regional Mexican format known La Mejor from MVS Radio.
