= XHCHA-FM =

Radio station in Chihuahua City, Chihuahua, Mexico

- Chihuahua City, Chihuahua; Mexico
- Frequency: 104.5 MHz
- Branding: La Lupe

Programming
- Format: Variety hits

Ownership
- Owner: Multimedios Radio; (Multimedios Radio, S.A. de C.V.)
- Sister stations: XHAHC-FM, XHCHH-FM, XHHEM-FM

History
- First air date: 1993 (concession)
- Call sign meaning: "Chihuahua"

Technical information
- Licensing authority: CRT
- Class: B
- ERP: 25,000 watts
- HAAT: 232.1 m (761 ft)

Links
- Webcast: Listen live
- Website: mmradio.com

XHCHA-FM is a radio station in Chihuahua City, Chihuahua, Mexico. Broadcasting on 104.5 FM, XHCHA is owned by Multimedios Radio and carries its La Lupe Spanish variety hits format.

== History ==
XHCHA was made available for commercial use on December 5, 1989, with a maximum ERP of 50 kilowatts. Bidders for the station included Joaquín Vargas Gómez of MVS Radio and Francisco Aguirre Gómez of Grupo Radio México. In 1990, the government declared Radio Espectacular the winner of the station; the concession was awarded in 1993.

The station has been owned by Multimedios for its entire history. Previous formats on XHCHA include Radio Recuerdo and Stereo Hits (which became Hits FM).

On January 17, 2020, Multimedios Radio flipped XHCHA to its La Lupe variety hits format, and Hits FM moved to XHHEM-FM, leading to the end of Classic.
