= 640 AM =

AM radio frequency

640 AM - The following radio stations broadcast on AM frequency 640 kHz: 640 AM is a North American clear-channel frequency. KFI in Los Angeles, California, KYUK in Bethel, Alaska, and CBN in St. John's, Newfoundland and Labrador, share Class A status of 640 AM.

== In Argentina ==
- LRA24 in Río Grande, Tierra del Fuego
- LU18 in General Roca, Río Negro
- LV15 in Villa Mercedes, San Luis

== In Bolivia ==
- CP 157 in Milluni

== In Brazil ==
- ZYH458 in Itabuna
- ZYH-757 in Goiânia
- ZYI-240 in Vitória·
- ZYI-418 in Alta Floresta
- ZYJ262 in Londrina
- ZYJ-489 in Resende
- ZYJ590 in Natal, Rio Grande do Norte
- ZYK-277 in Porto Alegre
- ZYK-547 in Araraquara
- ZYL-308 in Para de Minas

== In Canada ==
Stations in bold are clear-channel stations.

Call sign	City of license	Daytime power (kW)	Nighttime power (kW)	Transmitter coordinates
CBIA	Gjoa Haven, Nunavut	0.04	0.04	68.6267°N 95.8725°W
**CBN**	St. John's, Newfoundland and Labrador	10	10	47.568889°N 52.8125°W
CFIQ	Richmond Hill, Ontario	50	50	43.179167°N 79.433056°W

== In Chile ==
- CA-064 in Curico
- CD-064 in Temuco

== In Costa Rica ==
- TIQQ in San José

== In Colombia ==
- HJBJ in Santa Marta
- HJR32 in Bucaramanga

== In Cuba ==
- CMLA in Victoria de Las Tunas

== In Ecuador ==
- HCXY1 in Quito

== In France ==
=== In Guadeloupe ===
- FFQ in Point-à-Pitre

== In Guatemala ==
- TGW in Guatemala City

== In Honduras ==
- HRNN4 in Tegucigalpa

== In Mexico ==
- XELOVE-AM in Cd. Juárez, Chihuahua
- XENQ-AM in Tulancingo, Hidalgo
- XETAM-AM in Santa Elena, Tamaulipas

== In Panama ==
- HOK 22 in Colón

== In Paraguay ==
- ZP 19 in Coronel Oviedo

== In Peru ==
- OAZ4K in Lima

== In the United States ==
Stations in bold are clear-channel stations.

Call sign	City of license	Facility ID	Class	Daytime power (kW)	Nighttime power (kW)	Unlimited power (kW)	Transmitter coordinates
**KFI**	Los Angeles, California	34425	A	50	50		33.879722°N 118.013056°W
KTIB	Thibodaux, Louisiana	36183	B	5	1		29.851389°N 90.913333°W
KWPN	Moore, Oklahoma	22190	B	5	1		35.289167°N 97.502222°W
**KYUK**	Bethel, Alaska	4963	A			10	60.7825°N 161.883333°W
WBIN	Atlanta, Georgia	29730	B	50	1		33.761944°N 84.458056°W
WCRV	Collierville, Tennessee	6486	B	50	0.48		34.993056°N 89.899444°W
WFNC	Fayetteville, North Carolina	8583	B	10	1		35.079444°N 78.932778°W
WHLO	Akron, Ohio	43858	B	5	0.5		41.079722°N 81.645833°W
WMEN	Royal Palm Beach, Florida	61080	B	7.5	0.46		26.755°N 80.366667°W
WMFN	Peotone, Illinois	55089	B	4.4	1.6		41.301111°N 87.835278°W
WNNZ	Westfield, Massachusetts	9736	B	50	1		42.179444°N 72.751389°W
WOI	Ames, Iowa	29119	B	5	1		41.992778°N 93.690833°W
WVLG	Wildwood, Florida	70724	B	0.93	0.86		28.904444°N 81.96°W
WWJZ	Mount Holly, New Jersey	43904	B	50	0.95		39.996944°N 74.719722°W
WXSM	Blountville, Tennessee	29513	B	10	0.81		36.521944°N 82.423611°W

Between 1951 and 1963, the frequency was also one of two used for the United States' CONELRAD emergency broadcasting system, the other frequency being 1240 AM.

== In Venezuela ==
- YVSI in Maracaibo
- YVQO in Puerto La Cruz
