= XHHC-FM =

Radio station in Ensenada, Baja California, Mexico

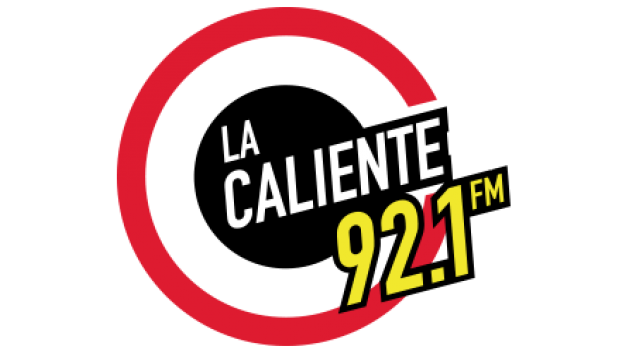
- Ensenada, Baja California; Mexico
- Frequency: 92.1 MHz
- Branding: La Caliente

Programming
- Format: Regional Mexican

Ownership
- Owner: Multimedios Radio; (Radio Informativa, S.A. de C.V.)
- Sister stations: XHPENS-FM

History
- First air date: 22 November 1958; 5 January 2013 (FM)
- Former call signs: XEHC-AM
- Former frequencies: 1590 kHz (1958–2014)

Technical information
- Licensing authority: CRT
- Class: AA
- ERP: 12,500 watts
- HAAT: 61.2 m (201 ft)
- Transmitter coordinates: 31°53′18.20″N 116°37′55.60″W

Links
- Webcast: Listen live
- Website: mmradio.com

XHHC-FM is a radio station on 92.1 FM in Ensenada, Baja California, Mexico, carrying the La Caliente regional Mexican format from Multimedios Radio.

== History ==
XEHC-AM received its concession on 22 November 1958. It was owned by José de Jesús Partida Villanueva and broadcast on 920 kHz with 2,500 watts. By the end of the 1960s, it was owned by Gloria Herminia Enciso Power and had increased its power to 10,000 watts day and 1,500 night on 1590 kHz. For most of its history, it was known as Radio Bahía (Radio Bay).

XHHC-FM came to air on 5 January 2013, with the AM transmitter being shut off the next year; the station changed formats twice in that year, becoming La Bestia Grupera in 2014. The 92.1 frequency in Ensenada had previously been occupied by XHBCE-FM, which in the mid-2000s conducted a series of moves and a frequency change in order to move from Ensenada to Tecate. XHHC during this time was the Ensenada affiliate for Spanish-language radio broadcasts of the San Diego Chargers. In 2015, XHHC and XHEPF-FM 89.1 swapped formats, this station becoming adult contemporary "Vida 92.1".

In 2017, Grupo Audiorama and XHHC went their separate ways, with XHHC changing names to Radio Alegría before coming under Multimedios Radio management and picking up its La Caliente Regional Mexican format. On 7 April 2018, Multimedios signed on XHPENS-FM 94.7 and moved La Caliente there, leaving XHHC to take on the Hits FM format.

In February 2018, XHHC-FM was approved for a power increase from 6 to 12.5 kW. XHHC switched to La Lupe on 4 June 2019, and returned to La Caliente in November 2020 when La Lupe moved to XHPENS.

Members of the Enciso family sold XHHC-FM to Grupo Multimedios directly in a transaction approved by the Federal Telecommunications Institute on 14 September 2022.
