= XHPCCC-FM =

Radio station in Ciudad Cuauhtémoc, Chihuahua, Mexico

- Ciudad Cuauhtémoc, Chihuahua; Mexico
- Frequency: 103.3 MHz
- Branding: La Lupe

Programming
- Format: Variety hits

Ownership
- Owner: Multimedios Radio; (Multimedios Radio, S.A. de C.V.)
- Sister stations: XHCTC-FM

History
- First air date: October 25, 2017
- Call sign meaning: "Ciudad Cuauhtémoc, Chihuahua"

Technical information
- Licensing authority: CRT
- Class: B1
- ERP: 25 kW
- HAAT: 127 m (417 ft)
- Transmitter coordinates: 28°24′07.97″N 106°51′22.15″W

Links
- Webcast: Listen live
- Website: mmradio.com

XHPCCC-FM is a radio station on 103.3 FM in Ciudad Cuauhtémoc, Chihuahua, Mexico. It is owned by Multimedios Radio and carries its La Lupe variety hits format.

== History ==
XHPCCC was awarded in the IFT-4 radio auction of 2017 and came to air on October 25 of that year, initially with the Hits FM pop format. Hits FM had previously been heard in Cuauhtémoc on XHDT-FM 98.3 as part of an affiliation agreement with that station's owner, GRD Multimedia. In August 2018, XHPCCC flipped to La Lupe, Multimedios's Spanish adult hits format.

On June 1, 2022, XHPCCC was leased out to Voz y Visión Radio, which runs a mix of pirates and leased stations in Chihuahua. Previously, in 2021, it had leased Grupo BM Radio stations XHRCH-FM and XHSBT-FM elsewhere in the state. In late 2022, Voz y Visión Radio ceased operating in Ciudad Cuauhtémoc, and Multimedios restored the La Lupe format.
