= XENL-AM =

Radio station in Monterrey, Nuevo León, Mexico

- Monterrey, Nuevo León; Mexico
- Frequency: 860 kHz
- Branding: Radio Recuerdo

Programming
- Format: Romantic/oldies

Ownership
- Owner: Multimedios Radio; (La Voz de Linares, S.A.)
- Sister stations: Radio: XERG-AM, XET-AM, XEAU-AM, XEAW-AM, XETKR-AM, XHERG-FM, XET-FM, XHJD-FM, XHAW-FM, XHTKR-FM, XHLUPE-FM, XHITS-FM, XHPJ-FM; TV: XHAW-TDT;

History
- First air date: 15 October 1958 (concession)
- Call sign meaning: Nuevo León

Technical information
- Licensing authority: CRT
- Class: B
- Power: 5,000 watts day 1,500 watts night
- Transmitter coordinates: 25°41′57.2″N 100°12′27.1″W

Links
- Webcast: XENL-AM

XENL-AM is a radio station on 860 AM in Monterrey, Nuevo León, Mexico. It is owned by Multimedios Radio and carries a romantic/oldies format known as Radio Recuerdo.

== History ==
XENL received its concession on 15 October 1958. It broadcast with 5,000 watts during the day and 2,000 watts at night under three owners in ten years: Cadena Radiotelevisora del Norte, S.A. (owned by the Serna family); Propulsora del Radio, S.A.; and Canal 86, S.A., upon the Serna family selling it to Multimedios (known then as Organización Estrellas de Oro).
