= XHAW-FM =

Radio station in Monterrey, Nuevo León

Simulcast of XEAW-AM 1280
- Monterrey, Nuevo León; Mexico
- Frequency: 101.3 MHz
- Branding: La Gran AW

Programming
- Format: Romantic

Ownership
- Owner: Multimedios Radio; (Radio Informativa, S.A. de C.V.)
- Sister stations: Radio: XERG-AM, XENL-AM, XET-AM, XEAU-AM, XEAW-AM, XETKR-AM, XHERG-FM, XET-FM, XHJD-FM, XHTKR-FM, XHLUPE-FM, XHITS-FM, XHPJ-FM; TV: XHAW-TDT;

History
- First air date: October 20, 1983 (concession)
- Former call signs: XHIL-FM (1983–1993)
- Call sign meaning: Derived from XEAW-AM and XHAW-TV

Technical information
- Licensing authority: CRT
- Class: B
- ERP: 25 kW
- HAAT: 142.2 meters (467 ft)
- Transmitter coordinates: 25°37′35.1″N 100°19′11.2″W (main) 25°38′48.8″N 100°18′46.7″W (aux)
- Repeater: 103.7 XHTKR-HD2 (Monterrey)

Links
- Webcast: Listen live
- Website: www.mmradio.com/radio/programas/aw-1013-fm-monterrey

XHAW-FM is a radio station on 101.3 FM in Monterrey, Nuevo León, Mexico. The station is owned by Multimedios Radio and carries a romantic format known as La Gran AW; since 2012, it has been simulcast on XEAW-AM 1280. The station also transmits the Telediario newscasts from co-owned Multimedios Televisión. The transmitter is located atop Cerro del Mirador.

== History ==
On October 20, 1983, a concession was issued to Francisco Ibarra López, the president of Grupo ACIR, for a new radio station on 101.3 MHz in Monterrey, named XHIL-FM using his initials.

Effective July 16, 1993, ACIR sold XHIL-FM to Multimedios, in the person of Francisco Antonio González Sánchez. The station was simultaneously renamed XHAW-FM. (Grupo ACIR now owns another XHIL-FM, in the state of Veracruz.)
