= XHITS-FM =

Radio station in Monterrey, Nuevo León, Mexico

- Monterrey, Nuevo León; Mexico
- Frequency: 106.1 MHz
- Branding: Hits FM

Programming
- Language: Spanish
- Format: Spanish Pop music

Ownership
- Owner: Multimedios Radio; (Radio Informativa, S.A. de C.V.)
- Sister stations: Radio: XERG-AM; XENL-AM; XET-AM; XEAU-AM; XEAW-AM; XETKR-AM; XHERG-FM; XET-FM; XHJD-FM; XHAW-FM; XHTKR-FM; XHLUPE-FM; XHPJ-FM; TV XHAW-TDT;

History
- First air date: February 19, 1992 (concession)
- Former call signs: XHMNR-FM
- Call sign meaning: "Hits"

Technical information
- Licensing authority: CRT
- Class: C1
- ERP: 100 kW
- HAAT: 142.2 meters (467 ft)
- Transmitter coordinates: 25°37′35.1″N 100°19′11.2″W (main) 25°38′48.8″N 100°18′46.7″W (aux)

Links
- Website: www.mmradio.com/estaciones/hits-1061-fm-monterrey

XHITS-FM is a radio station in Monterrey, Nuevo León, Mexico. Broadcasting on 106.1 FM, XHITS is owned by Multimedios Radio and carries a Spanish Pop format known as Hits FM. The transmitter is located atop Cerro del Mirador.

== History ==
The concession history for XHITS begins as XHMNR-FM, awarded to Roberto Torres García in 1992.

In 1999, Multimedios Radio bought XHMNR and immediately moved the XHITS callsign and format from 103.7 FM to this station.
