= XHERG-FM =

Sports radio station in Guadalupe, Nuevo León, Mexico

XEERG-AM / XHERG-FM
Simulcast of XERG-AM 690
- Guadalupe, Nuevo León; Mexico
- Frequencies: 800 kHz; 92.9 MHz
- Branding: RG La Deportiva

Programming
- Format: Sports talk (XERG-AM)

Ownership
- Owner: Multimedios Radio; (Audio Publicidad, S.A. de C.V.)
- Sister stations: Radio: XERG-AM, XENL-AM, XET-AM, XEAU-AM, XEAW-AM, XETKR-AM, XET-FM, XHJD-FM, XHAW-FM, XHTKR-FM, XHLUPE-FM, XHITS-FM, XHPJ-FM; TV: XHAW-TDT;

History
- First air date: September 12, 1969
- Former call signs: XEDD-AM (1960–2018), XHDD-FM (2010–2018)
- Former frequencies: 1560 AM
- Call sign meaning: Disambiguation of XERG-AM

Technical information
- Licensing authority: CRT
- Class: C1 (FM); B (AM)
- Power: 10,000 watts daytime 2,500 watts nighttime (AM)
- ERP: 100,000 watts (FM)
- HAAT: 120.3 m (395 ft)
- Transmitter coordinates: 25°14′14.6″N 99°50′11.7″W (AM) 25°40′14.5″N 100°03′50.7″W (FM primary) 25°14′14.6″N 99°50′11.7″W (FM complimentary)
- Repeaters: XHERG-FM Ojo de Agua (Montemorelos), NL (250 watts)

Links
- Webcast: www.mmradio.com/radio-envivo/29511 streaming.multimedios.com/station4
- Website: www.multimedios.com/radio/programas/rg-la-deportiva-929-fm-monterrey

XEERG-AM/XHERG-FM is a radio station serving Guadalupe and Montemorelos, Nuevo León, Mexico.

== History ==
The final logo used in Montemorelos

XEDD-AM was founded in Montemorelos, Nuevo León by Adalberto Javier Pezino González on September 12, 1969, on 1560 kHz. In 2000, the station moved to 800 and gained its FM counterpart, XHDD-FM, in 2010 (though it had to remain on AM).

In 2017, now under Multimedios control, XHDD-FM was approved for a major technical increase. The existing Montemorelos facility was repurposed as a booster at 250 watts, while a new, 100,000-watt transmission facility was constructed at La Peña in Guadalupe, Nuevo León, which will provide service in the Monterrey area and make up for coverage lost during the AM-FM migration; the station is also continuity-obligated to serve 388 people in four localities that have no other broadcasting service.

On April 4, 2018, the new facilities were officially turned on, and XHDD became a Monterrey station with a full simulcast of Multimedios's sports talk XERG-AM 690 "RG La Deportiva". The callsign of the stations was also changed from XEDD-AM and XHDD-FM to XEERG-AM and XHERG-FM, effective April 18, 2018. In September 2018, Multimedios was approved to begin HD Radio broadcasts on XHERG-FM.
