= XHON-FM =

Radio station in Tampico, Tamaulipas

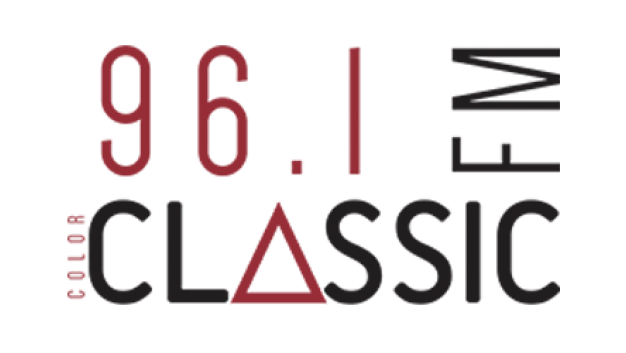
- Tampico, Tamaulipas; Mexico
- Frequency: 96.1 FM
- RDS: XHON CLASSIC 96.1 FM ARTIST NAME SONG NAME
- Branding: Classic 96.1

Programming
- Format: English classic hits into 70s, 80s, 90s and 2000s

Ownership
- Owner: Multimedios Radio; (Multimedios Radio, S.A. de C.V.)
- Sister stations: Radio: XHFW-FM; XHTPO-FM; XHTW-FM; TV: XHTAO-TDT;

History
- First air date: July 11, 1980 (concession)

Technical information
- Licensing authority: CRT
- Class: A
- ERP: 1 kW
- HAAT: 63.2 m (207 ft)
- Transmitter coordinates: 22°14′32.2″N 97°52′17.2″W

Links
- Webcast: listen live
- Website: Multimedios Radio official website

XHON-FM (branded as Classic 96.1) is a radio station in Tampico, Tamaulipas, Mexico. It broadcasts mainly English classic hits.

== History ==
XHON received its concession on July 11, 1980, It created the four station FM in Tampico. It was owned by Víctor Flores Meza. In 2016 the Flores family transferred operation of its stations to Multimedios Radio, who converted them to its own formats. XHON was given the Classic format (though with a slight change in name). Multimedios bought XHON outright, with the concession itself transferred from Formula Flores, S.A. de C.V., to Multimedios Radio, S.A. de C.V. in 2017. At the same time, the station started broadcasting 24 hours a day. In April 2018, XHON's transmitter was moved to the Multimedios FM and TV tower in Tampico.
