= XEACH-AM =

Radio station in Monterrey

- Guadalupe-Monterrey, Nuevo León; Mexico
- Frequency: 770 kHz
- Branding: Radio Fórmula (Primera Cadena)

Programming
- Format: News/talk

Ownership
- Owner: Grupo Fórmula; (Transmisora Regional Radio Fórmula, S.A. de C.V.)
- Sister stations: XHMON-FM, XEIZ-AM

History
- First air date: January 18, 1974 (concession)
- Former frequencies: 1590 kHz

Technical information
- Licensing authority: CRT
- Class: B
- Power: 25 kW day 1 kW night
- Transmitter coordinates: 25°40′15.3″N 100°11′07.1″W

Links
- Website: radioformulamonterrey.com

XEACH-AM is a radio station on 770 AM in Monterrey, Nuevo León. Mexico. It is an owned and operated station of Radio Fórmula.

== History ==
XEACH received its concession on January 18, 1974. It broadcast on 1590 kHz with 5,000 watts and was owned by the estate of Daniel Morales Blumenkron. In 1980, the station was sold to Radio 1590, S.A., which in the 1990s moved XEACH to 770 kHz before selling the station to Radio Fórmula in 2000. Fórmula quintupled the station's power from 5,000 watts day/200 night to 25,000 watts day/1,000 night.
