= XHLRS-FM =

Radio station in Villagrán–Ciudad Victoria, Tamaulipas, Mexico

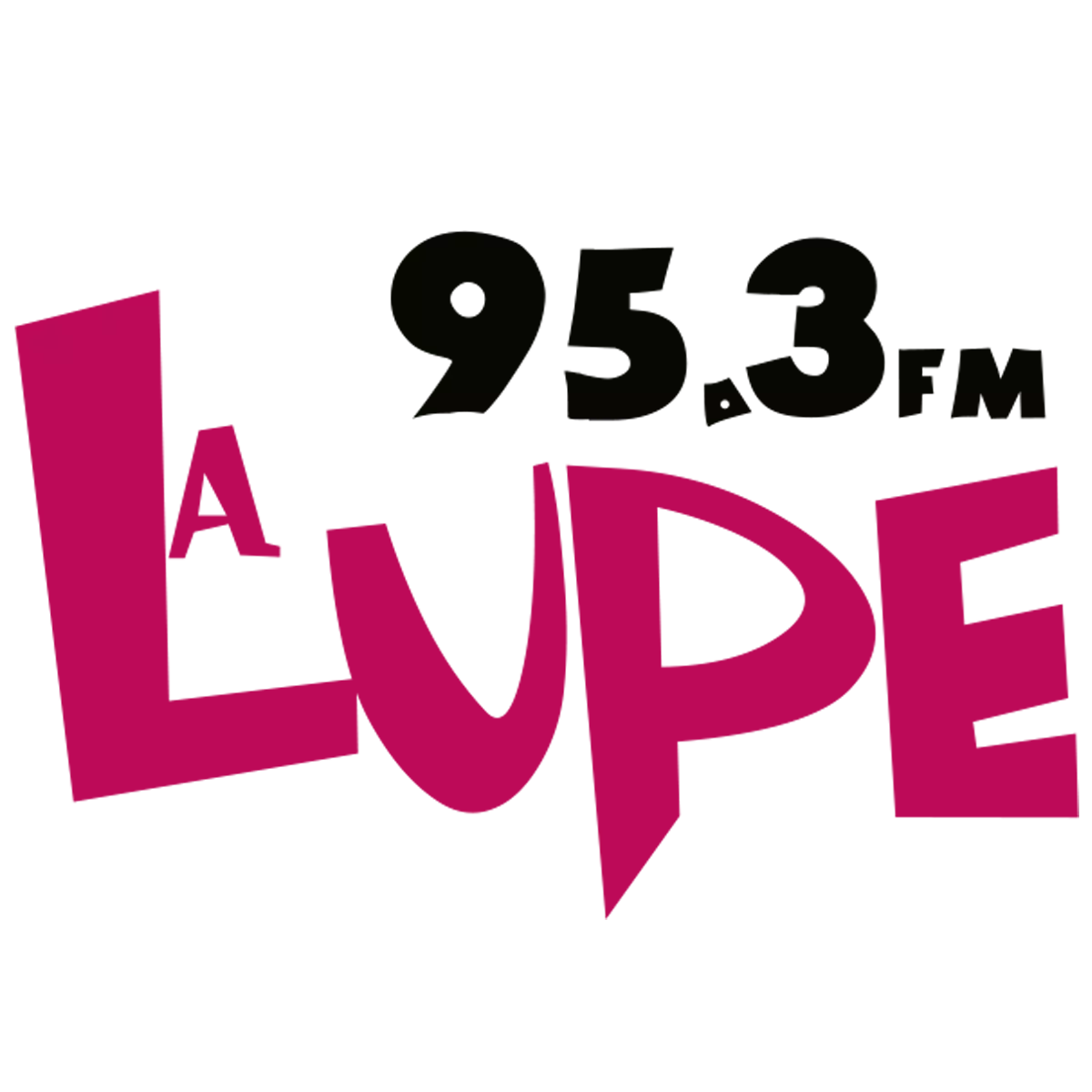
- Linares, Nuevo León/Villagrán, Tamaulipas; Mexico
- Broadcast area: Ciudad Victoria, Tamaulipas
- Frequency: 95.3 FM
- Branding: La Lupe

Programming
- Format: Variety hits

Ownership
- Owner: Multimedios Radio; (Radio Informativa, S.A. de C.V.)
- Sister stations: TV: XHVTU-TDT

History
- First air date: October 28, 1994 (concession)
- Call sign meaning: Nominal location of station, "Linares"

Technical information
- Licensing authority: CRT
- Class: C1
- ERP: 100 kW
- HAAT: 251.1 m (824 ft)
- Transmitter coordinates: 24°29′26″N 99°29′47″W (Villagrán); 23°43′09.72″N 99°08′46.23″W (Ciudad Victoria)
- Repeaters: 95.3 FM Ciudad Victoria (2.421 kW ERP, -125.5 m HAAT)

Links
- Webcast: Listen live
- Website: mmradio.com

XHLRS-FM is a radio station licensed to Linares, Nuevo León, Mexico, serving Villagrán and Ciudad Victoria, Tamaulipas. It broadcasts on 95.3 FM and carries the company's La Lupe Spanish variety hits brand. The main transmitter is in Villagrán with a booster in Ciudad Victoria.

== History ==
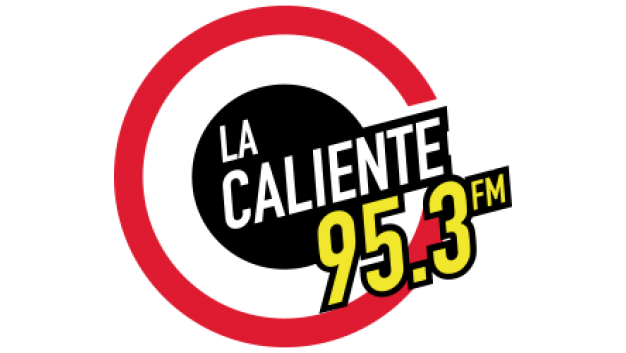
Logo as La Caliente 95.3, used until 2020

XHLRS received its concession in October 1994 and has been owned by Multimedios throughout its history.

On June 1, 2020, Multimedios flipped the formats of XHLRS and XHPMAZ-FM in Mazatlán from the grupera La Caliente brand to Spanish variety hits as La Lupe.
