= XEBJB-AM =

Radio station in Apodaca-Monterrey, Nuevo León, Mexico

- Apodaca-Monterrey, Nuevo León; Mexico
- Broadcast area: Monterrey metropolitan area
- Frequency: 570 AM
- Branding: BJB Regional Mexicana

Programming
- Format: Regional Mexican

Ownership
- Owner: Grupo Radio Alegría; (Notigramex, S.A. de C.V.)
- Sister stations: XHRK-FM, XHMG-FM, XHXL-FM, XHGBO-FM, XEFZ-AM, XEMR-AM, XEVB-AM, XENV-AM

History
- First air date: January 3, 1948 (concession)

Technical information
- Licensing authority: CRT
- Class: B
- Power: 5,000 watts day 500 watts night
- Transmitter coordinates: 25°37′50.2″N 100°02′24.0″W

Links
- Webcast: Listen live
- Website: gruporadioalegria.mx

XEBJB-AM is a radio station on 570 AM in Monterrey, Nuevo León, also serving Apodaca. It is owned by Grupo Radio Alegría and is known as BJB Regional Mexicana, carrying a Regional Mexican format.

== History ==
XEBJB received its concession on January 3, 1948. In the 1960s, it spawned a sister FM station, XEBJB-FM 96.5 (now XHRK-FM 95.7). In 2018, XEBJB—then a Regional Mexican station known as "BJB Regional Mexicana" began broadcasting on XHGBO-FM 92.1, a GRA-owned station in General Bravo that raised its power substantially and became a rimshot of Monterrey; this ended on January 4, 2021 after it was sold to Grupo ABC.

On November 24, 2024, XEBJB-AM stopped broadcasting Christian programming and the BJB Regional Mexicana format returned after it resumed its original operation under Grupo Radio Alegría's ownership.
