= XHFW-FM =

Radio station in Tampico, Tamaulipas

XHFW-FM/XEFW-AM
- Tampico, Tamaulipas; Mexico
- Frequency: 88.5 FM / 810 AM
- Branding: Hits FM

Programming
- Format: Latin pop

Ownership
- Owner: Multimedios Radio; (Radio Centinela, S.A. de C.V.)
- Sister stations: Radio: XHTPO-FM; XHTW-FM; XHON-FM; TV: XHTAO-TDT;

History
- First air date: 1932 (AM); 2012 (FM)
- Former frequencies: 1240 AM (1932–1950); 810 AM (1950-2011); 106.3 FM (2012–2018)

Technical information
- Licensing authority: CRT
- Class: B1 (FM)
- Power: 50 kW
- ERP: 25 kW
- HAAT: 58.9 m (193 ft)
- Transmitter coordinates: 22°10′30.0″N 97°50′01.3″W (AM); 22°13′12.4″N 97°51′47.7″W (FM)

Links
- Webcast: Listen live
- Website: www.mmradio.com

XHFW-FM/XEFW-AM (branded as Hits FM) is a radio station in Tampico, Tamaulipas, Mexico, broadcasting on 88.5 FM. It is owned and operated by Multimedios Radio. 810 AM is a United States clear-channel frequency; KSFO and WGY share Class A status on this frequency.

== History ==
XEFW-AM 1240 received its concession in 1932. The 70-watt station owned by José Expedito Martínez until 1937, when the Flores family entered broadcasting by way of a joint partnership with Martínez. XEFW was later moved to 810 kHz and ramped up its power to 50,000 watts both day and night, earning it the distinction of being a border blaster in the eyes of some.

In the 1980s, XEFW cut its power back to 10,000 watts during the day and a mere 250 watts at night, later boosted back to 50,000/1,000. The station was now exclusively owned by the Flores family, which had built a local cluster featuring XEFW, AM sister XETW-AM 860, XHON-FM 96.1, and XHFW-TV channel 9.

In 2011, the Flores family took advantage of the government's program to migrate AM stations to FM and converted XEFW into XHFW-FM broadcasting on 106.3 MHz. XHFW was known as La Estrella.

In 2016, the Flores family ceded operation of its radio stations to Multimedios Radio, which converted them to their own formats. XHFW was given the Hits FM Spanish pop format. On April 26, 2018, XHFW-FM was moved to 88.5 MHz in order to clear 106-108 MHz for community and indigenous stations, as a condition of the renewal of its concession in 2017.

On April 25, 2018, the Federal Telecommunications Institute approved the transfer of XHFW-FM to Radio Centinela, S.A. de C.V., a direct subsidiary of Multimedios Radio.

== See also ==
- Border blaster
