= XERG-AM =

Sports radio station in Guadalupe-Monterrey, Nuevo León, Mexico

Simulcast of XHERG-FM 92.9
- Guadalupe-Monterrey, Nuevo León; Mexico
- Frequency: 690 kHz
- Branding: RG La Deportiva

Programming
- Format: Sports

Ownership
- Owner: Multimedios Radio; (La Voz de Linares, S.A.)
- Sister stations: Radio: XENL-AM, XET-AM, XEAU-AM, XEAW-AM, XETKR-AM, XHERG-FM, XET-FM, XHJD-FM, XHAW-FM, XHTKR-FM, XHLUPE-FM, XHITS-FM, XHPJ-FM; TV: XHAW-TDT;

History
- First air date: April 3, 1959 (concession)
- Former call signs: XEEO-AM
- Call sign meaning: Radiodifusoras González (original concessionaire of station)

Technical information
- Licensing authority: CRT
- Class: B
- Power: 10,000 watts day 1,000 watts night
- Transmitter coordinates: 25°39′20.9″N 100°15′18.9″W

Links
- Webcast: XERG-AM

XERG-AM is a sports radio station on 690 AM in Monterrey, Nuevo León, Mexico. It is owned by Multimedios Radio and carries a sports format known as RG La Deportiva.

== History ==
Previously used logo

XEEO-AM received its concession on April 3, 1959, owned by Multimedios founder Jesús Dionisio González González. In the 1960s, it became XERG-AM, and not long after, it was transferred to concessionaire Radiodifusoras González, S.A. It originally broadcast with 500 watts during the day and 250 at night. In the 1980s, power was increased to 2,500 watts day and 500 night. A further power hike came in the 2000s.

In December 2017, after a major facility upgrade, RG La Deportiva began to be simulcast on XEDD-AM/XHDD-FM, which in 2018 changed its call letters to XHERG-FM/XEERG-AM.
