= XETKR-AM =

Radio station in Monterrey, Nuevo León, Mexico

- Guadalupe, Nuevo León; Mexico
- Frequency: 1480 AM
- Branding: Radio Vida

Programming
- Format: Christian

Ownership
- Owner: Multimedios Radio; (Multimedios, S.A. de C.V.)
- Sister stations: Radio: XERG-AM, XENL-AM, XET-AM, XEAU-AM, XEAW-AM, XHERG-FM, XET-FM, XHJD-FM, XHAW-FM, XHTKR-FM, XHLUPE-FM, XHITS-FM, XHPJ-FM; TV: XHAW-TDT;

History
- First air date: March 21, 1961 (concession)
- Former call signs: XENJ-AM

Technical information
- Licensing authority: CRT
- Class: B
- Power: 10,000 watts day 1,000 watts night
- Transmitter coordinates: 25°41′57.2″N 100°12′27.1″W

Links
- Webcast: Listen live
- Website: mmradio.com

XETKR-AM is a radio station on 1480 AM in Guadalupe, Nuevo León, Mexico which serves the greater Monterrey area. It is owned by Multimedios Radio and is known as Radio Vida.

== History ==
Previously used logo

XENJ-AM received its concession on March 21, 1961. It operated from Guadalupe and was owned by Remigio González González. Radio Triunfos, S.A. became the concessionaire in July 1964, with the callsign changing to the current XETKR. Daytime power was raised from 1,000 to 5,000 watts by the 1980s and then to 10,000 in the 1990s. Since its launch, the station carried a Regional Mexican/ranchera format, which lasted for 65 years, until on September 21, 2026, it switched to a Christian radio format known as "Radio Vida", rebroadcasting programming originating from Houston station KLVL. The ranchera music format continues as a commercial-free online stream on Multimedios Radio's website.
