= XHTRR-FM =

Radio station in Torreón, Coahuila

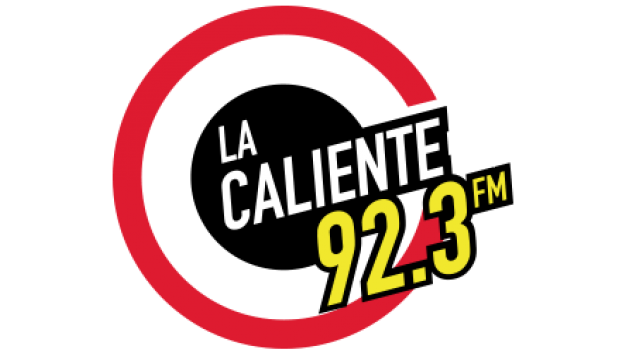
- Torreón, Coahuila; Mexico
- Broadcast area: Comarca Lagunera
- Frequency: 92.3 FM
- Branding: La Caliente

Programming
- Format: Regional Mexican

Ownership
- Owner: Grupo Multimedios; (Multimedios Radio, S.A. de C.V.)
- Sister stations: XHCTO-FM, XHWN-FM, XHETOR-FM, XHRCA-FM

History
- First air date: 1993
- Call sign meaning: "Torreón"

Technical information
- Licensing authority: CRT
- Class: B
- ERP: 15,000 watts
- HAAT: 421.2 m (1,382 ft)

Links
- Website: www.mmradio.com/lacaliente923/index.php

XHTRR-FM is a commercial radio station located in Torreón, Coahuila, broadcasting to the Comarca Lagunera area on 92.3 FM. XHTRR airs a Regional Mexican format branded as "La Caliente".

== History ==
XHTRR received its concession on November 30, 1990, and signed on in 1993. It was originally owned by Radio Fama, S.A. de C.V.
