= XENV-AM =

Radio station in Monterrey, Nuevo León, Mexico

- Monterrey, Nuevo León; Mexico
- Frequency: 1340 kHz
- Branding: Radio 13 + Vallenata

Programming
- Format: Cumbia and vallenato music

Ownership
- Owner: Grupo ABC; (Profesionales de la Radio, S.A. de C.V.)
- Sister stations: XEFZ-AM, XEBJB-AM, XEMR-AM, XEVB-AM, XHXL-FM, XHRK-FM, XHMG-FM, XHGBO-FM

History
- First air date: December 15, 1959 (concession)

Technical information
- Licensing authority: CRT
- Class: C
- Power: 1 kW
- Transmitter coordinates: 25°39′22.7″N 100°19′54.5″W

Links
- Website: gruporadioalegria.mx

XENV-AM is a radio station on 1340 AM in Monterrey, Nuevo León. Mexico. It is known as Radio 13 + Vallenata and carries a format of cumbia and vallenato music.

== History ==
XENV received its concession on December 15, 1959. It was owned by Gonzalo Estrada Cruz until 2004, when it was transferred to members of the Estrada family.
