= XHMON-FM =

Radio Fórmula station in Guadalupe-Monterrey, Nuevo León, Mexico

- Guadalupe-Monterrey, Nuevo León; Mexico
- Frequency: 89.3 MHz (HD Radio)
- Branding: Radio Fórmula

Programming
- Format: News/talk

Ownership
- Owner: Grupo Fórmula; (Transmisora Regional Radio Fórmula, S.A. de C.V.)
- Sister stations: XEACH-AM, XEIZ-AM

History
- First air date: November 29, 1988 (concession); April 2018 (FM)
- Former call signs: XEMON-AM
- Former frequencies: 1370 kHz (1988–2020)
- Call sign meaning: MONterrey

Technical information
- Licensing authority: CRT
- Class: A
- ERP: 3 kW
- HAAT: −39.3 m (−129 ft)
- Transmitter coordinates: 25°38′48.8″N 100°18′46.7″W

Links
- Website: radioformulamonterrey.com

XHMON-FM is a radio station on 89.3 FM in Monterrey, Nuevo León, Mexico. It carries Radio Fórmula programming. Its transmitter is located atop Cerro Loma Larga.

== History ==
XEMON-AM received its concession on November 29, 1988. It was owned by Radio Color, S.A., a subsidiary of Radiorama, and was sold to Radio Fórmula in the person of Rogerio Mariano Azcárraga Madero in 1997.

In April 2018, XEMON-AM conducted its second-wave migration to FM as XHMON-FM 89.3. The station broadcasts in HD Radio and originally offered four subchannels, including feeds of XEACH-AM and XEIZ-AM and the Trión musical format.
