= XHJD-FM =

Radio station in Monterrey, Nuevo León, Mexico

- Monterrey, Nuevo León; Mexico
- Frequency: 98.9 MHz
- Branding: D99

Programming
- Format: Top 40 (CHR)

Ownership
- Owner: Multimedios Radio; (Radio Informativa, S.A. de C.V.)
- Sister stations: Radio: XERG-AM; XENL-AM; XET-AM; XEAU-AM; XEAW-AM; XETKR-AM; XHERG-FM; XET-FM; XHAW-FM; XHTKR-FM; XHLUPE-FM; XHITS-FM; XHPJ-FM; TV: XHAW-TDT;

History
- First air date: September 20, 1974 (concession)
- Call sign meaning: Jesús D. González González (founder of Multimedios)

Technical information
- Licensing authority: CRT
- Class: B
- ERP: 25 kW
- HAAT: 286.6 meters (940 ft)
- Transmitter coordinates: 25°37′35.1″N 100°19′11.2″W (main) 25°38′48.8″N 100°18′46.7″W (aux)

Links
- Webcast: www.mmradio.com/radio-envivo/2923
- Website: www.mmradio.com/radio/programas/d99-989-fm-monterrey

XHJD-FM 98.9 MHz (known as D99) is a CHR radio station in Monterrey, Nuevo León. Mexico. The station plays songs and some promotions in English with commercials in Spanish. It is also available through the second audio program of Multimedios Televisión over its Mexican/American cable feed, and locally on XHAW-TDT (though its American-acquired syndicated programming is excluded). The transmitter is located atop Cerro del Mirador.

== History ==
XHJD has always been part of Multimedios, receiving its concession in 1974 and named for Jesús D. González, founder of Multimedios. The station was originally known as Stereo 99, changing its name to "Energy 99" in the late 1980s and adopting its current D99 moniker in the early 1990s.
