= XEAW-AM =

Radio station in Monterrey, Nuevo León, Mexico

Simulcast of XHAW-FM 101.3
- Guadalupe-Monterrey, Nuevo León; Mexico
- Frequency: 1280 kHz
- Branding: La Gran AW

Programming
- Format: Romantic

Ownership
- Owner: Multimedios Radio; (Multimedios, S.A. de C.V.)
- Sister stations: Radio: XERG-AM, XENL-AM, XET-AM, XEAU-AM, XETKR-AM, XHERG-FM, XET-FM, XHJD-FM, XHAW-FM, XHTKR-FM, XHLUPE-FM, XHITS-FM, XHPJ-FM; TV: XHAW-TDT;

History
- First air date: 1934
- Former call signs: XEX-AM
- Call sign meaning: Derived from XHAW-FM and XHAW-TV

Technical information
- Licensing authority: CRT
- Class: B
- Power: 10,000 watts daytime 1,000 watts nighttime (AM)
- Transmitter coordinates: 25°41′57.2″N 100°12′27.1″W
- Repeater: 103.7 XHTKR-HD2 (Monterrey)

Links
- Webcast: Listen live
- Website: mmradio.com

XEAW-AM is a radio station located in Monterrey, Nuevo León, Mexico, owned and operated by Multimedios Radio and currently simulcasts XHAW-FM's La Gran AW romantic format. The station also transmits the Telediario newscasts from co-owned Multimedios Televisión. XEAW-AM broadcasts on a frequency of 1280 kHz.

== Prior use of call sign ==
The XEAW-AM callsign first appeared on a border-blaster radio station located in Reynosa, Tamaulipas, across the Rio Grande (Río Bravo) from McAllen, Texas, USA. In the 1930s the station came under the control of Dr. John R. Brinkley who became famous for both his controversial treatments of sexual dysfunction and his operations of XER and XERA at Villa Acuña (modern-day Ciudad Acuña, Coahuila), opposite Del Rio, Texas.

In 1939, XEAW was purchased from Brinkley by Carr Collins, Sr., in a deal that was quietly assisted by then–Texas governor W. Lee "Pappy" O'Daniel. The station was used by Carr's brother Hal to sell his company's "Crazy Water Crystals," a product that was deemed fraudulent by the FTC in 1940. In 1943, Mexican authorities backed by soldiers seized the station and shut it down. In exchange for safe passage of his radio equipment out of the country, Carr Collins gifted a Mexican general with a transformer he needed for his factory.

== History ==
Meanwhile, in Monterrey, XEX-AM on 1310 kHz started up in 1934; in 1937, Jesús Dionisio González (El Heraldo del Comercio, S.A.) bought the station from Don Federico Zertuche. The first transmission over XEX was a baseball game from Mexico City. In the early 1950s, the government requested the XEX callsign to build a national network, and in turn the station received the new callsign XEAW; at the same time, the station moved to 1280 kHz. In 1968, the Estrellas de Oro group expanded to a television station, XHAW-TV channel 12.

== See also ==
- Border blaster – a list of super-power radio stations located on the international border of Mexico facing the United States.
- Dr. John R. Brinkley – brief biography and history of XER and XERA.
