= XHESH-FM =

Radio station in Sabinas Hidalgo, Nuevo León, Mexico

XHESH-FM / XESH-AM
- Sabinas Hidalgo, Nuevo León; Mexico
- Frequencies: 97.7 MHz; 1400 kHz
- Branding: Radio Sabinas

Programming
- Format: Regional Mexican

Ownership
- Owner: Grupo Radio Alegría; (Radiodifusoras Independientes, S.A. de C.V.)
- Sister stations: XHSBH-FM

History
- First air date: October 30, 1967 (concession)
- Call sign meaning: "Sabinas, Hidalgo"

Technical information
- Licensing authority: CRT
- Class: A (FM); C (AM)
- Power: 1 kW
- ERP: 3 kW
- HAAT: −61.43 m (−201.5 ft)
- Transmitter coordinates: 26°29′23″N 100°10′54″W

Links
- Webcast: Listen live
- Website: radiosabinas.com

XHESH-FM/XESH-AM is a combo radio station on 97.7 FM and 1400 AM in Sabinas Hidalgo, Nuevo León. The station is owned by Grupo Radio Alegría and carries a Regional Mexican format known as Radio Sabinas.

== History ==
XESH-AM received its concession on October 30, 1967. It was owned by Tomás García Jiménez and broadcast on 1400 kHz with 250 watts. It was sold to the current concessionaire in 1977 and soon after raised its power to 1,000 watts.

In January 2012, XESH was authorized to migrate to FM. However, it was required to maintain its AM frequency in operation.
