= Xyloglucan endo-transglycosylase =

Xyloglucan endo-transglycosylase C terminal domain
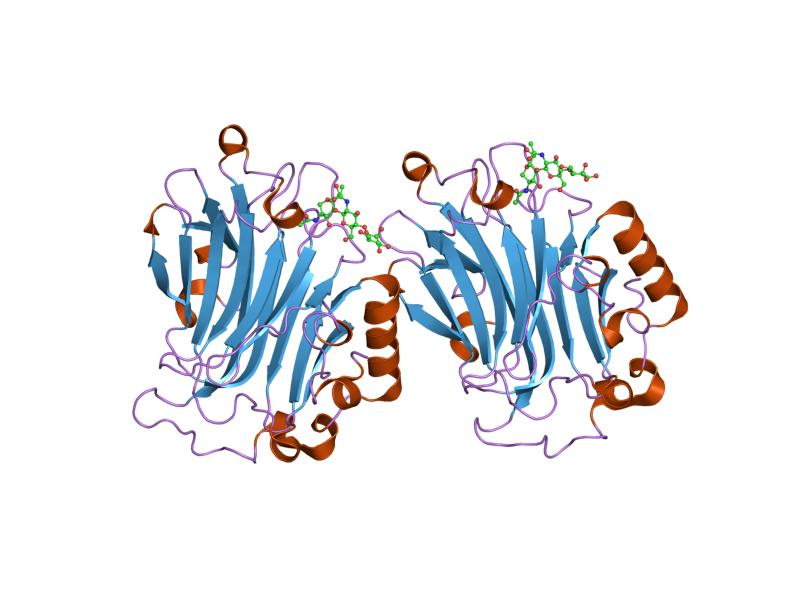
- xyloglucan endotransglycosylase native structure.

Identifiers
- Symbol: XET_C
- Pfam: PF06955
- InterPro: IPR010713
- SCOP2: 1un1 / SCOPe / SUPFAM
Available protein structures:
- PDB: IPR010713 PF06955 (ECOD; PDBsum)
- AlphaFold: IPR010713; PF06955

In molecular biology, the xyloglucan endo-transglycosylase (XET) is an enzyme that is involved in the metabolism of xyloglucan, which is a component of plant cell walls. This enzyme is part of glycoside hydrolase family 16.

== Function ==
Xyloglucan endo-transglycosylase (XET) is thought to be highly important during seed germination, fruit ripening, and rapid wall expansion.

Xyloglucan is the predominant hemicellulose in the primary cell walls of most dicotyledons. With cellulose, it forms a network that strengthens the cell wall. XET catalyses the splitting of xyloglucan chains and the linking of the newly generated reducing end to the non-reducing end of another xyloglucan chain, thereby loosening the cell wall.
