= XEMR-AM =

Radio station in Monterrey, Nuevo León, Mexico

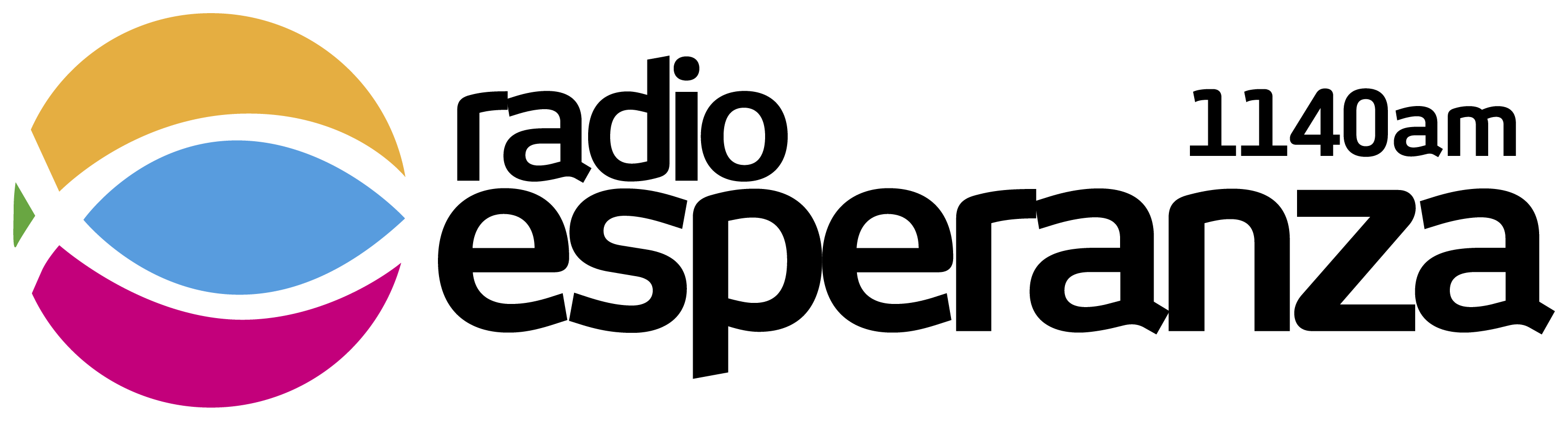
- Apodaca, Nuevo León; Mexico
- Broadcast area: Monterrey Metropolitan area
- Frequency: 1140 kHz
- Branding: Radio Esperanza

Programming
- Format: Christian

Ownership
- Owner: Grupo ABC; (Notigramex, S.A. de C.V.)
- Sister stations: XEBJB-AM, XEFZ-AM, XENV-AM, XEVB-AM, XHMG-FM, XHRK-FM, XHXL-FM, XHGBO-FM

History
- First air date: December 31, 1940; 85 years ago

Technical information
- Licensing authority: CRT
- Facility ID: 102481
- Class: A (clear-channel)
- Power: 50,000 watts
- Transmitter coordinates: 25°45′15.1″N 100°18′50.7″W

Links
- Webcast: XEMR Listen Online
- Website: XEMR Radio Esperanza website

XEMR-AM (1140 kHz) is a Mexican clear-channel station. It is licensed to Apodaca, Nuevo León, Mexico, part of the Monterrey Metropolitan area. Organizacion Mexicana de Radio, S.A. de C.V., holds the concession. XEMR is operated by Grupo Radio Alegría.

XEMR radiates 50,000 watts, sharing Class A status with WRVA Richmond, Virginia, on 1140 AM. It uses a directional antenna at all times. The transmitter is east of Monterrey, near the town of Cadereyta, Nuevo León.

== History ==
XEMR received its first concession on December 31, 1940. It was owned by Enrique Serna Martínez and broadcast on 1400 kHz. It was sold to Propulsora del Radio in 1962, and to its current concessionaire in 1967.
