= Multimedios Radio =

Mexican radio broadcaster

Multimedios Radio is a Mexican radio broadcaster and the current radio division of Grupo Firmas Globales, operating 61 radio stations in Mexico. Multimedios traces its history to the founding of XEAW-AM in the late 1930s.

== Stations ==
=== Monterrey, Nuevo León ===
Multimedios owns 14 stations in its home city of Monterrey:

- XENL-AM 860 "Radio Recuerdo" (romantic)
- XET-AM 990 "La T Grande de Monterrey" (talk)
- XEAU-AM 1090 "Milenio Radio" (Milenio Televisión audio)
- XETKR-AM 1480 "TKR 1480" (ranchera)
- XHERG-FM 92.9 / XERG-AM 690 "La Deportiva" (sports)
- XET-FM 94.1 "La Caliente" (Regional Mexican)
- XHJD-FM 98.9 "D99" (CHR)
- XHAW-FM 101.3 / XEAW-AM 1280 "La Gran AW" (oldies)
- XHTKR-FM 103.7 "La Ke Buena" (Regional Mexican)
- XHLUPE-FM 105.3 "La Lupe" (Spanish adult hits)
- XHITS-FM 106.1 "Hits FM" (Latin pop)
- XHPJ-FM 106.9 "Classic 106.9" (album-oriented rock)

== Outside of Monterrey ==
=== Baja California ===
- XHHC-FM 92.1 Ensenada, Baja California
- XHPENS-FM 94.7 Ensenada, Baja California
- XHHIT-FM 95.3 Tijuana, Baja California

=== Chiapas ===
- XHTUG-FM 103.5 Tuxtla Gutiérrez, Chiapas

=== Chihuahua ===
- XHCTC-FM 99.9 Ciudad Cuauhtémoc, Chihuahua
- XHPCCC-FM 103.3 Ciudad Cuauhtémoc, Chihuahua
- XHLOVE-FM 104.7 / XELOVE-AM 640 Ciudad Juárez, Chihuahua
- XHAHC-FM 90.9 Chihuahua, Chihuahua
- XHCHH-FM 94.9 Chihuahua
- XHCHA-FM 104.5 Chihuahua, Chihuahua
- XHHPR-FM 101.7 Hidalgo del Parral, Chihuahua

=== Coahuila ===
- XHTRR-FM 92.3 Torreón, Coahuila
- XHCTO-FM 93.1 Torreón, Coahuila
- XHWN-FM 93.9 Torreón, Coahuila
- XHETOR-FM 99.9 Torreón, Coahuila
- XHRCA-FM 102.7 Torreón, Coahuila
- XHQC-FM 93.5 Saltillo, Coahuila
- XHDE-FM 105.7 Saltillo, Coahuila
- XHCLO-FM 107.1 Monclova, Coahuila

=== Durango ===
- XHRPU-FM 102.9 Durango, Durango

=== Guanajuato ===
- XHPEBJ-FM 96.7 León, Guanajuato

=== Jalisco ===
- XHKB-FM 99.9 Guadalajara, Jalisco

=== Nayarit ===
- XHETD-FM 92.5 & XETD-AM 570 Tecuala, Nayarit
- XHPCTN-FM 88.3 Tepic, Nayarit
- XHXT-FM 105.7 Tepic, Nayarit

=== Nuevo León ===
- XHLN-FM 104.9 Linares, Nuevo León
- XHR-FM 105.7 Linares, Nuevo León

=== Oaxaca ===
- XHAXA-FM 88.9 Oaxaca, Oaxaca
- XHKZ-FM 98.1 Salina Cruz, Oaxaca

=== Quintana Roo ===
- XHROO-FM 95.3 Chetumal, Quintana Roo

=== San Luis Potosí ===
- XHSNP-FM 97.7 San Luis Potosí, San Luis Potosí
- XHCZ-FM 104.9 San Luis Potosí, San Luis Potosí

=== Sinaloa ===
- XHCCCC-FM 90.7 Culiacán, Sinaloa
- XHPMAZ-FM 92.1 Mazatlán, Sinaloa

=== Tamaulipas ===
- XHLRS-FM 95.3 Ciudad Victoria, Tamaulipas/Linares, Nuevo León
- XHVTH-FM 107.1 Matamoros, Tamaulipas
- XHGNK-FM 96.7 Nuevo Laredo, Tamaulipas
- XHNLO-FM 97.1 Nuevo Laredo, Tamaulipas
- XHAAA-FM 93.1 Reynosa, Tamaulipas
- XHFW-FM 88.5 / XEFW-AM 810 Tampico, Tamaulipas
- XHTPO-FM 94.5 Tampico, Tamaulipas
- XHTW-FM 94.9 Tampico, Tamaulipas
- XHON-FM 96.1 Tampico, Tamaulipas

=== Veracruz ===
- XHFTI-FM 89.5 Fortín de las Flores, Veracruz
- XHPUGC-FM 105.7 Úrsulo Galván-Cardel, Veracruz
- XHPALV-FM 100.9 Alto Lucero-Xalapa, Veracruz

== International ==
Multimedios owns one station outside of Mexico, Top Radio 97.2 in Madrid, Spain.

== See also ==
- Grupo Multimedios
