= XHERN-FM =

Radio station in Montemorelos, Nuevo León

- Montemorelos, Nuevo León; Mexico
- Frequency: 100.9 FM
- Branding: Radio Naranjera

Programming
- Format: Regional Mexican

Ownership
- Owner: Grupo Mass Comunicaciones; (Radio Televisora del Valle, S.A. de C.V.)

History
- First air date: July 21, 1967 (concession)
- Call sign meaning: Radio Naranjera

Technical information
- Licensing authority: CRT
- Class: AA
- ERP: 6 kW
- HAAT: 62.3 m (204 ft)
- Transmitter coordinates: 25°11′27″N 99°52′05″W

Links
- Website: radionaranjera.com.mx

XHERN-FM is a radio station on 100.9 FM in Montemorelos, Nuevo León. The station is owned by Grupo Mass Comunicaciones and is known as Radio Naranjera, which offers a Regional Mexican format.

== History ==
XERN-AM received its concession on July 21, 1967. It broadcast as a daytimer on 950 kHz with 1 kW. In the 1990s, it increased its power to 5 kW and began broadcasting with 1 kW at night.

In the 1990s and early 2010s, XERN had a sister station on FM also in Montemorelos, XHMSN-FM on 100.1. That station was moved to Monterrey and now broadcasts on 96.5 MHz in that city since 2012.

In October 2011, XERN was authorized to migrate to FM as XHERN-FM on 100.9.

Former logo
