= XHLUPE-FM =

Radio station in Monterrey, Nuevo León, Mexico

- Monterrey, Nuevo León; Mexico
- Frequency: 105.3 MHz
- RDS: ESCUCHAS LA LUPE ARTIST AND SONG NAME
- Branding: La Lupe

Programming
- Format: Variety hits

Ownership
- Owner: Multimedios Radio; (Radio Informativa, S.A. de C.V.)
- Sister stations: Radio: XERG-AM; XENL-AM; XET-AM; XEAU-AM; XEAW-AM; XETKR-AM; XHERG-FM; XET-FM; XHJD-FM; XHAW-FM; XHTKR-FM; XHITS-FM; XHPJ-FM; TV: XHAW-TDT;

History
- First air date: September 29, 1991 (concession)
- Former call signs: XHPAG-FM (1991–2020)
- Call sign meaning: La Lupe

Technical information
- Licensing authority: CRT
- Class: C
- ERP: 30 kW
- HAAT: 1,113.21 meters (3,652.3 ft)
- Transmitter coordinates: 25°37′58.0″N 100°14′05.2″W (main) 25°38′48.8″N 100°18′46.7″W (aux)

Links
- Webcast: Listen live
- Website: www.lamusica.com/en/stations/xhlupe

°

XHLUPE-FM is a radio station on 105.3 FM in Monterrey, Nuevo León, Mexico, owned by Multimedios Radio and carrying its "La Lupe" Variety hits format. The transmitter is located atop Cerro de la Silla.

It received its concession as XHPAG-FM on September 29, 1991, then known as "Papagayos FM", based in Los Ramones and transmitting from the Sierra Papagayos range northeast of town. It was later billed as "Ke Buena" (1998–2001), "La Más Buena" (2002–2012) and "105.3, La Que Te Complace" (2012–2017) before taking the La Lupe moniker since 2017. The call sign was adopted in 2020.
