= XHTW-FM =

Radio station in Tampico, Tamaulipas, Mexico

- Tampico, Tamaulipas; Mexico
- Frequency: 94.9 FM
- RDS: LA LUPE
- Branding: La Lupe

Programming
- Format: Variety hits

Ownership
- Owner: Multimedios Radio; (Multimedios Radio, S.A. de C.V.)
- Sister stations: Radio: XHFW-FM; XHTPO-FM; XHON-FM; TV: XHTAO-TDT;

History
- First air date: January 21, 1961 (concession)
- Former call signs: XETW-AM
- Former frequencies: 860 AM (1961–2014); 107.1 FM (2012–2018)

Technical information
- Licensing authority: CRT
- Class: B1
- ERP: 12.5 kW
- HAAT: 60.2 m (198 ft)
- Transmitter coordinates: 22°13′12.97″N 97°51′47.64″W

Links
- Webcast: listen live
- Website: Multimedios Radio official website

XHTW-FM is a radio station on 94.9 FM serving Tampico, Tamaulipas, Mexico. It is owned by Multimedios Radio and carries its La Lupe variety hits format.

== History ==
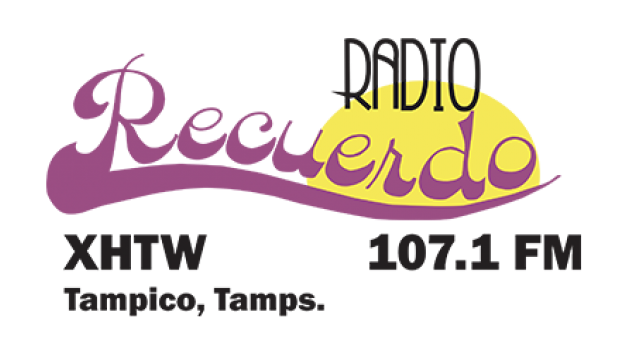
Final logo on 107.1, used from September 2016 to April 2018

José Expedito Martínez was cleared to begin broadcasts of XETW-AM on January 21, 1961. The station was sold to the Flores family in 1963, and until the 1990s it broadcast with 500 watts.

XHTW was cleared to migrate to FM in 2011, originally broadcasting on 107.1 MHz from 6 am to 12 am each day.

In September 2016, Grupo Flores ceded operation of its radio stations to Multimedios Radio, transferring XHON-FM's concession to Multimedios along with operation of XHFW and XHTW. At the time, XHTW took on a Spanish romantic format known as Radio Recuerdo. On April 25, 2018, the Federal Telecommunications Institute approved the transfer of XHTW-FM to Multimedios Radio, S.A. de C.V., a direct subsidiary of Multimedios Radio.

As part of the 2017 renewal of XHTW's concession, the station moved to 94.9 MHz on April 26, 2018, in order to clear 106-108 MHz as much as possible for community and indigenous radio stations.

On June 21, 2018, Multimedios Radio replaced Radio Recuerdo with La Lupe, a new variety classic hits format introduced in several other Multimedios markets.
