= XEVB-AM =

Radio station in Monterrey, Nuevo León, Mexico

- San Nicolás de los Garza, Nuevo León; Mexico
- Frequency: 1310 kHz
- Branding: ABC Noticias

Programming
- Format: News/talk, Spanish classic hits

Ownership
- Owner: Grupo ABC; (Grupo Radio Alegría, S.A. de C.V.)
- Sister stations: XEFZ-AM, XEBJB-AM, XEMR-AM, XENV-AM, XHXL-FM, XHRK-FM, XHMG-FM, XHGBO-FM

History
- First air date: August 31, 1977 (concession)

Technical information
- Licensing authority: CRT
- Class: B
- Power: 5,000 watts (daytimer)
- Transmitter coordinates: 25°45′15.2″N 100°18′50.6″W

XEVB-AM is a radio station on 1310 AM in Monterrey, Nuevo León. Mexico. It is owned by Grupo Radio Alegría and is known as ABC Noticias, carrying a Spanish-language classic hits and news/talk format.

== History ==
XEVB received its concession on August 31, 1977.
