= XEFZ-AM =

Radio station in Monterrey, Nuevo León, Mexico

Simulcast with XHGBO-FM 92.1
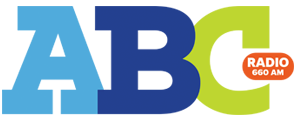
- San Nicolás de los Garza-Monterrey, Nuevo León; Mexico
- Frequency: 660 kHz
- Branding: ABC Deportes

Programming
- Format: Sports talk

Ownership
- Owner: Grupo ABC; (Notigramex, S.A. de C.V.)
- Sister stations: XHRK-FM, XHMG-FM, XHGBO-FM, XHXL-FM, XEBJB-AM, XEMR-AM, XEVB-AM, XENV-AM

History
- First air date: March 29, 1971 (concession)

Technical information
- Licensing authority: CRT
- Class: B
- Power: 10,000 watts day 1,000 watts night
- Transmitter coordinates: 25°45′15.1″N 100°18′50.7″W

Links
- Website: abcdeportes.mx

XEFZ-AM is a radio station on 660 AM in San Nicolás de los Garza, Nuevo León. Mexico. It is owned by Grupo Radio Alegría and carries a sports talk format known as ABC Deportes.

== History ==
XEFZ received its concession on March 29, 1971. It operated on 1110 kHz as a 250-watt daytimer. Not long after, XEFZ moved to 660 and ramped up its power to 10,000 watts.

On January 4, 2021, XEFZ switched from news/talk "ABC Noticias" to sports talk "ABC Deportes". At the same time, XHGBO-FM 92.1 was switched to simulcasting the new sports talk format from carrying sister station XEBJB-AM 570.
