= XHRK-FM =

Radio station in Monterrey, Nuevo León

- Monterrey, Nuevo León; Mexico
- Frequency: 95.7 MHz
- Branding: La Sabrosita

Programming
- Format: Grupera

Ownership
- Owner: Grupo ABC; (Notigramex, S.A. de C.V.)
- Sister stations: XHGBO-FM, XHXL-FM, XHMG-FM, XEBJB-AM, XEFZ-AM, XEMR-AM, XEVB-AM, XENV-AM

History
- First air date: March 18, 1964 (concession)
- Former call signs: XEBJB-FM
- Call sign meaning: Rock (from its former name Stereo Rock)

Technical information
- Licensing authority: CRT
- Class: C1
- ERP: 100 kW
- HAAT: −204.4 meters (−671 ft)
- Transmitter coordinates: 25°39′22.7″N 100°19′54.5″W

Links
- Website: lasabrosita.fm

XHRK-FM is a radio station in Monterrey, Nuevo León. Mexico. Broadcasting on 95.7 FM, XHRK is owned by Grupo Radio Alegría and carries a grupera format known as La Sabrosita.

== History ==
XHRK began life as XEBJB-FM, authorized for 96.5 MHz and awarded on March 18, 1964. The station remained authorized as such through the 1960s. By the 1980s, XEBJB-FM had become XHRK-FM on its current frequency of 95.7 (a move-in, XHMSN-FM, would take the 96.5 frequency in 2012).
