= XHLN-FM =

Radio station in Linares, Nuevo León, Mexico

- Linares, Nuevo León; Mexico
- Frequency: 104.9 MHz
- Branding: La Ke Buena

Programming
- Format: Regional Mexican
- Affiliations: Radiópolis

Ownership
- Owner: Multimedios Radio; (Radio Centinela, S.A. de C.V.)
- Sister stations: XHR-FM

History
- First air date: August 23, 1943 (concession)
- Former call signs: XER-AM (1943–2011), XHR-FM (2011–2018)
- Former frequencies: 1260 kHz
- Call sign meaning: Linares

Technical information
- Licensing authority: CRT
- Class: AA
- ERP: 6 kW
- HAAT: 45.64 m (149.7 ft)
- Transmitter coordinates: 24°52′19.76″N 99°34′22.5″W

Links
- Webcast: Listen live

XHLN-FM is a radio station on 104.9 FM in Linares, Nuevo León, Mexico. It is owned by Multimedios Radio and carries the Ke Buena regional Mexican format from Radiópolis.

== History ==
XER-AM received its concession on August 23, 1943, restoring the call sign to use for the first time since the closure of John R. Brinkley's XER in Villa Acuña a decade earlier.

XER was owned by XER Radio Linares, S.A., and broadcast on 1260 kHz with 1,000 watts. The station eventually was bought by Multimedios. Its transmitter facility is located with co-owned XHR-FM 104.9; the two have shared facilities since their AM days.

On July 9, 2018, Multimedios switched the callsigns of its two Linares stations, resulting in XHLN-FM being assigned to 104.9 and XHR-FM to 105.7. The content of the two frequencies remained unchanged.
