= XHXL-FM =

Radio station in Monterrey, Nuevo León

- Monterrey, Nuevo León; Mexico
- Frequency: 91.7 MHz
- Branding: 91.7 Premier

Programming
- Format: Spanish & English classic hits

Ownership
- Owner: Grupo ABC; (Profesionales de la Radio, S.A. de C.V.)
- Sister stations: XHGBO-FM, XHRK-FM, XHMG-FM, XEBJB-AM, XEFZ-AM, XEMR-AM, XEVB-AM, XENV-AM

History
- First air date: December 15, 1959 (concession)

Technical information
- Licensing authority: CRT
- Class: C1
- ERP: 100 kW
- HAAT: −206.7 meters (−678 ft)
- Transmitter coordinates: 25°39′22.7″N 100°19′54.5″W

Links
- Website: premier917.fm

XHXL-FM is a radio station in Monterrey, Nuevo León. Mexico. Broadcasting on 91.7 FM, XHXL is owned by Grupo Radio Alegría and is known as 91.7 Premier.

== History ==
The concession for XHXL was obtained on December 15, 1959 by Gonzalo Estrada Cruz.

On February 22, 2020, XHXL began stunting with a loop of "This Love" by Maroon 5. Two days later, the station flipped from its previous Rock FM identity to adult contemporary as Nova 91.7. The format lasted less than a year and was replaced with "Premier 91.7" on January 4, 2021; the Premier moniker had previously been used at the company's XHMG-FM 102.9.
