= XEAU-AM =

Radio station in Monterrey, Nuevo León, Mexico

- Guadalupe-Monterrey, Nuevo León, Mexico; Mexico
- Frequency: 1090 kHz
- Branding: Milenio Radio

Programming
- Format: News/talk

Ownership
- Owner: Multimedios Radio; (Radio Centinela, S.A. de C.V.)
- Sister stations: Radio: XERG-AM, XENL-AM, XET-AM, XEAW-AM, XETKR-AM, XHERG-FM, XET-FM, XHJD-FM, XHAW-FM, XHTKR-FM, XHLUPE-FM, XHITS-FM, XHPJ-FM; TV: XHAW-TDT;

History
- First air date: February 21, 1969 (concession)

Technical information
- Licensing authority: CRT
- Class: B
- Power: 5,000 watts day 1,500 watts night
- Transmitter coordinates: 25°39′20.9″N 100°15′18.8″W
- Repeater: 103.7 XHTKR-HD3 (Monterrey)

Links
- Webcast: Listen live
- Website: mmradio.com

XEAU-AM is a radio station on 1090 AM in Monterrey, Nuevo León, Mexico. It is owned by Multimedios Radio and carries Milenio Radio along with sister station XHTKR-FM 103.7 HD3.

== History ==
XEAU received its concession on February 21, 1969. It was jointly owned by Jesús Dionisio and Francisco Antonio González, founders of Multimedios, and operated as a 500-watt daytimer on 1080 kHz, though in the 1980s it moved to 1090, enabling the first of two power increases. Operations were consolidated under Francisco Antonio González Sánchez in 2000, three years after Jesús's death.
