= XHMSN-FM =

Radio station in Cadereyta-Monterrey, Nuevo León, Mexico

- Cadereyta-Monterrey, Nuevo León; Mexico
- Frequency: 96.5 MHz
- Branding: Dominio FM

Programming
- Format: News/talk

Ownership
- Owner: Grupo Mass Comunicaciones; (Dominio Radio, S.A. de C.V.)
- Sister stations: XHERN-FM

History
- First air date: November 23, 1994 (concession)
- Former frequencies: 100.1 MHz (1994–2012)
- Call sign meaning: Montemorelos, Nuevo León, the original station location

Technical information
- Licensing authority: CRT
- Class: C1
- ERP: 100 kW
- HAAT: 90.75 meters (297.7 ft)
- Transmitter coordinates: 25°36′33.5″N 100°00′22.2″W

Links
- Website: dominiomedios.com

XHMSN-FM is a radio station in Cadereyta, Nuevo León, Mexico, serving Monterrey. Broadcasting on 96.5 FM, XHMSN is owned by Grupo Mass Comunicaciones and carries a news/talk format known as Dominio FM.

== History ==
The concession history for XHMSN begins in Montemorelos, where the Gámez family founded XERN-AM Radio Naranjera in 1964. Thirty years later, Jorge Álvaro Gámez González received a concession for a second station there. In 2000, the station broadcast franchised Regional Mexican formats La Mejor and later Ke Buena beginning in 2005.

On January 16, 2012, the station moved from Montemorelos on 100.1 MHz to Cadereyta on 96.5 MHz, with a power increase to 100 kW. This made it a move-in into the Monterrey area. That April, the station adopted its present news/talk format.

Previous logo
