= XHTAM-FM =

Radio station in Ciudad Victoria, Tamaulipas, Mexico

XETAM-AM/XHTAM-FM
- Santa Elena, Tamaulipas; Mexico
- Broadcast area: Ciudad Victoria
- Frequencies: 640 kHz; 96.1 MHz
- Branding: Romántica

Programming
- Language: Spanish
- Format: Romantic
- Affiliations: Grupo Radiorama

Ownership
- Owner: Grupo AS; (XETAM-AM, S.A. de C.V.)

History
- First air date: May 4, 1989 (concession)
- Call sign meaning: Tamaulipas

Technical information
- Licensing authority: CRT
- Class: B (AM); B1 (FM)
- Power: (AM) 5,000 watts day 1,000 watts night
- ERP: (FM) 10,000 watts
- HAAT: 1.7 m (5 ft 7 in)
- Transmitter coordinates: 23°42′10.6″N 99°6′38.8″W

Links
- Website: grupoasradio.com/victoria/

XETAM-AM/XHTAM-FM is a combo AM/FM radio station in Ciudad Victoria, Tamaulipas. It broadcasts on 640 AM and 96.1 FM and is known as Romántica with a romantic format.

== History ==
XETAM received its first concession on May 4, 1989. The original concessionaire was Promociones Radiofónicas Culturales, S.A. The station initially broadcast with 1,000 watts day and 250 watts night.

On November 4, 1994, XETAM was one of 83 stations that received a combo FM frequency.

On June 3, 2019, XETAM/XHTAM flipped from Ke Buena to romantic music as Romántica. It also began airing the syndicated Central FM morning newscast with Pedro Ferriz de Con.
