= XET-FM =

Radio station in Monterrey, Nuevo León, Mexico

- Monterrey, Nuevo León; Mexico
- Frequency: 94.1 MHz
- Branding: La Caliente

Programming
- Language: Spanish
- Format: Grupera

Ownership
- Owner: Multimedios Radio; (Radio Triunfos, S.A. de C.V.)
- Sister stations: Radio: XERG-AM; XENL-AM; XET-AM; XEAU-AM; XEAW-AM; XETKR-AM; XHERG-FM; XHJD-FM; XHAW-FM; XHTKR-FM; XHLUPE-FM; XHITS-FM; XHPJ-FM; TV: XHAW-TDT;

History
- First air date: September 13, 1957 (concession issued)

Technical information
- Licensing authority: CRT
- Class: B
- ERP: 25 kW
- HAAT: 142.2 meters (467 ft)
- Transmitter coordinates: 25°37′35.1″N 100°19′11.2″W (main); 25°38′48.8″N 100°18′46.7″W (aux)

Links
- Webcast: Listen live
- Website: www.lamusica.com/en/stations/xetfm

XET-FM is a radio station on 94.1 FM in Monterrey, Nuevo León, Mexico. It carries the La Caliente grupera format of its owner, Multimedios Radio. The transmitter is located atop Cerro del Mirador.

== History ==
XET-FM is the first FM station in Monterrey, with its concession issued on September 13, 1957.

XET logo used until the network adopted a new brand identity in 2017
