= XHMG-FM =

Radio station in Monterrey, Nuevo León

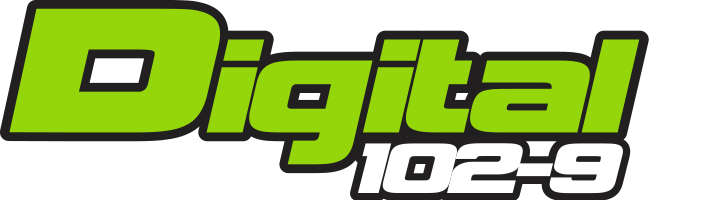
- Monterrey-Guadalupe, Nuevo León; Mexico
- Frequency: 102.9 MHz
- Branding: Digital 102-9

Programming
- Format: Pop

Ownership
- Owner: Grupo ABC; (Notigramex, S.A. de C.V.)
- Sister stations: XHGBO-FM, XHXL-FM, XHRK-FM, XEBJB-AM, XEFZ-AM, XEMR-AM, XEVB-AM, XENV-AM

History
- First air date: August 19, 1969 (concession)
- Former frequencies: 100.5 MHz (1969–1989)

Technical information
- Licensing authority: CRT
- Class: C1
- ERP: 100 kW
- HAAT: −37.25 meters (−122.2 ft)
- Transmitter coordinates: 25°39′22.7″N 100°19′54.5″W

Links
- Website: www.digital1029.fm www.gruporadioalegria.mx

XHMG-FM is a radio station in Monterrey, Nuevo León. Mexico. Broadcasting on 102.9 FM, XHMG is owned by Grupo Radio Alegría and carries a pop format known as Digital 102-9.

== History ==
Fernando Gracia López obtained the concession for XHMG, then broadcasting at 100.5 FM, on August 19, 1969. The station was sold in 1985 and had moved to 102.9 by 1989.
