= XHR-FM =

Radio station in Linares, Nuevo León, Mexico

XHR-FM and XELN-AM
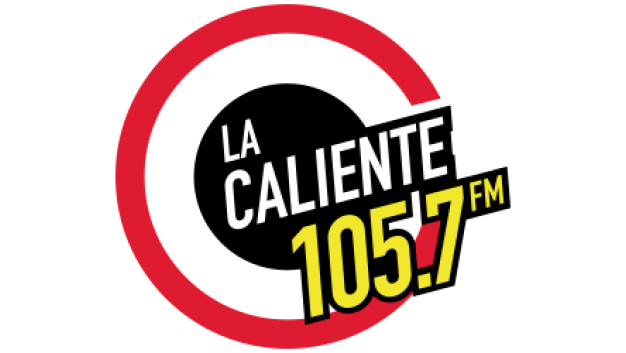

Linares, Nuevo León; Mexico
- Broadcast area: Linares, Nuevo León
- Frequencies: XHR-FM: 105.7 MHz; XELN-AM: 830 kHz
- Branding: La Caliente

Programming
- Format: Regional Mexican

Ownership
- Owner: Multimedios Radio; (La Voz de Linares, S.A.)
- Sister stations: XHLN-FM

History
- First air date: XELN-AM: April 1, 1969 (concession)
- Former call signs: XHR-FM: XHLN-FM (2011–2018)
- Former frequencies: XELN-AM: 790 kHz

Technical information
- Licensing authority: CRT
- Class: XHR-FM: AA; XELN-AM: B
- Power: XELN-AM: 5,000 Watts
- ERP: XHR-FM: 6 kW
- HAAT: XHR-FM: 45.64 m (149.7 ft)
- Transmitter coordinates: XHR-FM: 24°52′19.76″N 99°34′22.5″W

Links
- Webcast: Listen live
- Website: mmradiocom

XHR-FM is a radio station on 105.7 FM in Linares, Nuevo León. It carries the La Caliente Regional Mexican format from its owner, Multimedios Radio.

== History ==
XELN-AM received its concession on April 1, 1969. Owned since day one by La Voz de Linares, S.A. (now the concessionaire for six Multimedios Radio stations including XHLN), it broadcast with 1,000 watts on 790 kHz. In the early 2000s, XELN was moved to 830 in order to increase daytime power to 3,000 watts.

The station was eventually acquired by Multimedios Radio. Its transmitter facility is located with co-owned XHLN-FM 104.9; the two have shared facilities since their AM days.

XELN was approved to migrate to FM in October 2011, but is unable to shut off its AM because it serves 4,011 people without any other radio service, according to a 2018 IFT study.

On July 9, 2018, Multimedios switched the callsigns of its two Linares stations, resulting in XHLN-FM being assigned to 104.9 and XHR-FM to 105.7. The content of the two frequencies remained unchanged. However, the associated AM to the 105.7 FM facility remains XELN-AM.
