= XHPJ-FM =

Radio station in Monterrey, Nuevo León, Mexico

- Monterrey, Nuevo León; Mexico
- Frequency: 106.9 FM
- Branding: Classic 106.9

Programming
- Format: Classic rock in English

Ownership
- Owner: Multimedios Radio; (Radio Triunfos, S.A. de C.V.)
- Sister stations: Radio: XERG-AM; XENL-AM; XET-AM; XEAU-AM; XEAW-AM; XETKR-AM; XHERG-FM; XET-FM; XHJD-FM; XHAW-FM; XHTKR-FM; XHLUPE-FM; XHITS-FM; TV: XHAW-TDT;

History
- First air date: November 24, 1976 (concession)
- Former frequencies: 96.5 MHz
- Call sign meaning: Juan B. Peimbert Jiménez Castro (original concessionaire)

Technical information
- Licensing authority: CRT
- Class: C1
- ERP: 25 kW
- HAAT: 286.6 meters (940 ft)
- Transmitter coordinates: 25°37′35.1″N 100°19′11.2″W (main) 25°38′48.8″N 100°18′46.7″W (aux)

Links
- Webcast: Listen live
- Website: www.lamusica.com/en/stations/xhpj

XHPJ-FM (106.9 FM, "Classic 106.9") is a Classic rock radio station in Monterrey, Nuevo León. Mexico. The station broadcasts announcements and commercials in Spanish, though the music played is in English. The transmitter is located atop Cerro del Mirador.

== History ==
XHPJ received its concession on November 24, 1976. It was owned by Juan B. Peimbert Jiménez Castro and sold almost immediately to Multimedios.
