= XHQQ-FM =

Radio station in Monterrey, Nuevo León

- Monterrey, Nuevo León; Mexico
- Frequency: 93.3 MHz
- Branding: Banda 93.3

Programming
- Format: Regional Mexican

Ownership
- Owner: Grupo Radio Centro; (Radio Emisora XHSP-FM, S.A. de C.V.)
- Sister stations: XEH-AM, XESTN-AM

History
- First air date: December 21, 1963 (concession)
- Former call signs: XEH-FM

Technical information
- ERP: 50 kW
- Transmitter coordinates: 25°39′27.0″N 100°20′04.1″W

Links
- Website: banda933.com.mx

XHQQ-FM is a radio station in Monterrey, Nuevo León. Broadcasting on 93.3 FM, XHQQ is owned by Grupo Radio Centro, and is promoted as "Banda 93.3".

== History ==
XHQQ began life as XEH-FM, authorized for the even-decimal FM frequency of 93.2 MHz on a concession awarded on December 21, 1963. At the time, Mexico had authorized about 20 FMs on even-decimal frequencies, primarily as studio-transmitter links, though a special few were authorized as main stations; XEWV-FM 89.6 in Mexicali, Baja California, XEH-FM 93.2, and XHM-FM 88.8 in Mexico City were among this group. XEH changed calls to XHQQ in the late 1960s, and it remained the last even-frequency FM standing as of 1970. In the early 1970s, XHQQ came in line with most other radio stations in the Americas by moving to an odd-decimal frequency, in this case 93.3.

The station came under the ownership of Grupo Radio México, whose largest station cluster is in Monterrey. In 2015, ownership was transferred to Grupo Radio Centro as part of GRC's absorption of the concessionaires of 30 GRM radio stations; the two companies share family ownership.

In October 2015, Emisoras Incorporadas de Monterrey, S.A. de C.V. was replaced by Radio Emisora XHSP-FM as the concessionaire as part of a restructuring of several GRM stations.
