= XET-AM =

Radio station in Monterrey, Nuevo León, Mexico

- Monterrey, Nuevo León; Mexico
- Frequency: 990 AM
- Branding: La T Grande

Programming
- Language: Spanish
- Format: News, soap operas, Regional Mexican

Ownership
- Owner: Multimedios Radio; (Radio Triunfos, S.A. de C.V.)
- Sister stations: Radio: XERG-AM; XENL-AM; XEAU-AM; XEAW-AM; XETKR-AM; XHERG-FM; XET-FM; XHJD-FM; XHAW-FM; XHTKR-FM; XHLUPE-FM; XHITS-FM; XHPJ-FM; TV: XHAW-TDT;

History
- First air date: March 19, 1930

Technical information
- Licensing authority: CRT
- Class: B
- Power: 20,000 watts
- Transmitter coordinates: 25°38′48.8″N 100°18′46.7″W

Links
- Webcast: Listen live
- Website: www.mmradio.com/estaciones/la-t-grande-xet-990-am-monterrey

XET-AM, nicknamed La T Grande, is a commercial AM radio station on 990 kHz at Monterrey, Nuevo León, Mexico. It is part of Multimedios Radio's Monterrey station cluster. The transmitter is located in San Nicolás de los Garza, near Monterrey.

== History ==
XET went on the air in March 1930 as Monterrey's second radio station after XEH. It was founded by Emilio Azcárraga Vidaurreta. and eventually became a border blaster targeting the United States in English with a 50,000 watt signal. Studios were located at Galeana and Hidalgo streets. In the 2000s, it reduced its power to 20,000 watts. Azcárraga later sold the station to Cervecería Cuauhtémoc.

The Carter Family worked at the station in its early years, performing their country music and bluegrass music. As the station could be heard at night in the parts of the United States, XET helped the Carter Family's music became well known. In February 1939, over the air live, Sara Carter dedicated the song I'm Thinking Tonight of My Blue Eyes to her long-lost boyfriend Coy Bayes. On February 20, 1939, Sara Carter and Coy Bayes married at Brackettville, Texas.

In the 1970s, Grupo Estrellas de Oro, the predecessor to Multimedios Radio, acquired XET.
