= XHTKR-FM =

Radio station in Monterrey, Nuevo León, Mexico

- Monterrey, Nuevo León; Mexico
- Frequency: 103.7 MHz (HD Radio)
- Branding: La Ke Buena

Programming
- Format: Regional Mexican
- Subchannels: HD2: XEAW-AM/XHAW-FM simulcast; HD3: XEAU-AM simulcast
- Affiliations: Radiópolis

Ownership
- Owner: Multimedios Radio; (La Voz de Linares, S.A.)
- Sister stations: Radio: XERG-AM; XENL-AM; XET-AM; XEAU-AM; XEAW-AM; XETKR-AM; XHERG-FM; XET-FM; XHJD-FM; XHAW-FM; XHLUPE-FM; XHITS-FM; XHPJ-FM; TV: XHAW-TDT;

History
- First air date: August 23, 1979 (concession)
- Former call signs: XHNL-FM (1979–1988); XHITS-FM (1988–1999); XHFMTU-FM (1999–2024)
- Call sign meaning: Shared with XETKR-AM 1480

Technical information
- Licensing authority: CRT
- Class: C1
- ERP: 85 kW
- HAAT: 286.6 meters (940 ft)
- Transmitter coordinates: 25°37′35.1″N 100°19′11.2″W (main) 25°38′48.8″N 100°18′46.7″W (aux)

Links
- Webcast: Listen live
- Website: 103.7 FM & HD-1

XHTKR-FM is a radio station in Monterrey, Nuevo León, Mexico. Broadcasting on 103.7 FM, XHTKR is owned by Multimedios Radio and carries the La Ke Buena Regional Mexican format from Radiópolis. The transmitter is located atop Cerro del Mirador.

XHTKR-FM broadcasts in HD and is authorized to carry three subchannels:

- HD1 is a simulcast of the analog (traditional) signal.
- HD2 is a simulcast of XEAW-AM/XHAW-FM 1280/101.3.
- HD3 is a simulcast of XEAU-AM 1090.

== History ==
Logo as Milenio Radio used from 2012 to 2018

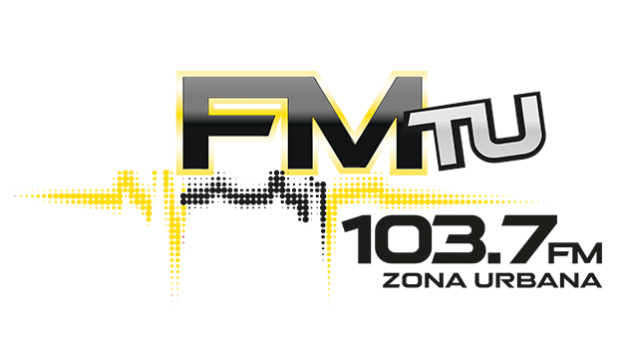
Logo used from April 2018 to May 2022.

Logo used from May 2022 to September 2023.

The concession history for XHTKR begins with the award of XHNL-FM to Alfonso Flores López on August 23, 1979. At that time, the station broadcast on 94.9 MHz, but soon after moved to the current frequency. In 1988, XHNL became XHITS-FM (the current call sign of 106.1), and in 1999 There was a format swap with XHMNR-FM and XHITS-FM along with the callsign change.

When the Milenio Radio format of news programs with English classic hits music was brought to Monterrey on XHFMTU in 2012, the FM Tú format went online-only. Milenio Radio itself was nearly completely wound down in early 2018, with XHFMTU being the last station to exit the format by way of the relaunch of FM Tú as an urban station on April 1, 2018. Milenio Radio was transitioned to the HD3 subchannel. XERG-AM 690 was on the HD3 subchannel until Multimedios was authorized to replace it with XENL-AM 860 on August 21, 2019; by that time, XHERG-FM 92.9 was operating.

On September 17, 2023, XHFMTU dropped FM Tú a second time and became a franchise of the Ke Buena regional format from Radiópolis. Ke Buena had previously been broadcast on XHCHL-FM as part of a lease deal with Heraldo Media Group, which ended on December 1, 2022. The call sign was changed to XHTKR-FM in 2024.
