= XEH-AM =

Radio station in Monterrey, Nuevo León

- San Nicolás de los Garza-Monterrey, Nuevo León; Mexico
- Frequency: 1420 AM
- Branding: XEH Antología Vallenata

Programming
- Format: Cumbia; Vallenato music

Ownership
- Owner: Grupo Radio Centro; (Radio Emisora XHSP-FM, S.A. de C.V.)
- Sister stations: XHQQ-FM, XESTN-AM

History
- First air date: 1921; 105 years ago

Technical information
- Licensing authority: CRT
- Class: B
- Power: 5,000 watts day 400 watts night

Links
- Webcast: Listen live
- Website: radiocentro.com

XEH-AM is a radio station on 1420 AM in Monterrey, Nuevo León, Mexico. It is owned by Grupo Radio Centro and carries a radio format of Cumbia and Vallenato music. Its transmitter is in San Nicolás de los Garza, just outside Monterrey.

XEH is considered one of the earliest radio stations in Mexico, hence its three-letter call sign; its history stretches back to 1921.

== History ==
XEH is among Mexico's pioneering radio stations, tracing its roots to Constantino de Tárnava's 1921 experimental transmissions of TND ("Tárnava Notre Dame"), the first radio station in Latin America, named for the University of Notre Dame in the United States where he studied electrical engineering. The station went through several call signs as Mexican call letter allotments changed, finally settling on XEH around the time of its first formal concession in 1932. At this point, XEH began branding itself as "The Voice of Monterrey Since 1921".

In 1962, de Tárnava sold XEH to Mario Quintanilla, owner of XEFB radio and television. The next year, XEH-FM on 93.2 MHz, an FM counterpart to XEH-AM, was authorized, though it would change its call letters to XHQQ-FM by the end of the decade. The XEFB-XEH radio cluster was ultimately sold off to what is now Grupo Radio Centro.

In 2015, Emisoras Incorporadas de Monterrey was replaced by Radio Emisora XHSP-FM as the concessionaire as part of a restructuring of the stations then owned by Grupo Radio México. GRM merged with corporate cousin Grupo Radio Centro in 2016.
