= 98.5 FM =

FM radio frequency

The following radio stations broadcast on FM frequency 98.5 MHz:

== Argentina ==
- 985 radio in Punta Alta, Buenos Aires
- Cielo in San Bernardo, Buenos Aires
- Meridiano in Coronel Charlone, Córdoba
- Momentos in Grutly, Santa Fe
- Orfeo in Córdoba
- Plus in Corrientes
- Popular in San Luis
- RD1 in Zárate, Buenos Aires

== Australia ==
- 2OOO in Sydney, New South Wales
- 4YOU in Rockhampton, Queensland
- ABC Classic in Bundaberg, Queensland
- Huon FM in Huon Valley, Tasmania
- 98.5 Apple (FM) in Melbourne, Victoria
- 3ONE in Shepparton, Victoria
- Radio National in Portland, Victoria
- Sonshine FM in Perth, Western Australia

== Canada (Channel 253) ==
- CBCW-FM in Whitney, Ontario
- CBH-FM-3 in Yarmouth, Nova Scotia
- CBKM-FM in Meadow Lake, Saskatchewan
- CBOF-FM-4 in Rolphton, Ontario
- CFCD-FM in Dryden, Ontario
- CFCE-FM in Guyer, Quebec
- CFTH-FM-2 in Baie-des-Moutons, Quebec
- CFWE-FM-4 in Spruce Grove, Alberta
- CHMP-FM in Longueuil / Montreal, Quebec
- CHOR-FM in Summerland, British Columbia
- CHRX-FM in Fort St. John, British Columbia
- CIAM-FM-11 in Vanderhoof, British Columbia
- CIBK-FM in Calgary, Alberta
- CIOA-FM in Orillia, Ontario
- CIOC-FM in Victoria, British Columbia
- CIOC-FM-1 in Saltspring Island, British Columbia
- CIOS-FM in Stephenville, Newfoundland and Labrador
- CJRG-FM-5 in Grande Vallee, Quebec
- CJWL-FM in Ottawa, Ontario
- CKRH-FM in Halifax, Nova Scotia
- CKWR-FM in Kitchener/Waterloo, Ontario
- VF2403 in Kilometre 38, Quebec
- VF2593 in Notre-Dame-du-Mont-Carmel, Quebec

== China ==
- Foshan Music Radio in Foshan

== Colombia ==
- Radio UNAL in Bogotá, Colombia

== Germany ==
- AFN Europe in Grafenwoehr, Bavaria
- Bayern 3 in Munich, Bavaria

== Guatemala (Channel 27) ==
- TGVB-FM in Guatemala City

== Israel ==
- Kan Kol Hamusica in Beersheba, Eilat, Haifa

== Marshall Islands ==
- BBC World Service at Majuro

== Malaysia ==
- TraXX FM in Central Kelantan
- Melody FM (Malaysia) in Ipoh, Perak

== Mexico ==
- XHBH-FM in Hermosillo, Sonora
- XHCLI-FM in Culiacán, Sinaloa
- XHCQ-FM in Tuxtla Gutiérrez, Chiapas
- XHDL-FM in Mexico City
- XHEB-FM in Ciudad Obregón, Sonora
- XHEOM-FM in Coatzacoalcos, Veracruz
- XHEPIC-FM in Tepic, Nayarit
- XHETO-FM in Tampico, Tamaulipas
- XHJS-FM in Hidalgo del Parral, Chihuahua
- XHMAR-FM in Acapulco, Guerrero
- XHMT-FM in Mérida, Yucatán
- XHNR-FM in Oaxaca, Oaxaca
- XHPCTQ-FM in Chetumal, Quintana Roo
- XHPVTS-FM in Villa Tututepec-Santiago Jocotepec, Oaxaca
- XHQK-FM in San Luis Potosí, San Luis Potosí
- XHSAP-FM in Agua Prieta, Sonora
- XHTYL-FM in Monterrey, Nuevo León
- XHWA-FM in Xalapa, Veracruz
- XHYQ-FM in Fresnillo, Zacatecas
- XHZHO-FM in Zihuatanejo, Guerrero
- XHZI-FM in Zacapu, Michoacán

== Philippines ==
- DZLC in Lipa City
- DWKD in Cauayan City
- DWJL in Daet, Carmarines Norte
- DYYM in Kalibo, Aklan
- DXBB in Butuan City
- DXFA in Liloy, Zamboanga del Norte
- DXPC in Cagwait, Surigao del Sur

== United Kingdom ==
- CNR1 in London

== United States (Channel 253) ==
- KAAI in Palisade, Colorado
- KABG in Los Alamos, New Mexico
- KACO in Apache, Oklahoma
- KBBT in Schertz, Texas
- KBBZ in Kalispell, Montana
- KDES-FM in Cathedral City, California
- KDFO in Delano, California
- KDNN in Honolulu, Hawaii
- KEWF in Billings, Montana
- KGBT-FM in McAllen, Texas
- KHAQ in Maxwell, Nebraska
- KHDY-FM in Clarksville, Texas
- KHGC in Montana City, Montana
- KHIC in Keno, Oregon
- KIFX in Naples, Utah
- KKFL-LP in Fowler, Colorado
- KKHQ-FM in Cedar Falls, Iowa
- KLGW in Grand Coulee, Washington
- KLKX-LP in Alexandria, Minnesota
- KLLP in Blackfoot, Idaho
- KLUC in Las Vegas, Nevada
- KNBQ in Central Park, Washington
- KOLS-LP in Oakhurst, California
- KOYC-LP in Pueblo, Colorado
- KPSA-FM in Lordsburg, New Mexico
- KQKQ in Council Bluffs, Iowa
- KQOV-LP in Butte, Montana
- KQYZ in Emerado, North Dakota
- KRAJ in Johannesburg, California
- KRFM in Show Low, Arizona
- KRGL in Ringgold, Louisiana
- KRGN-LP in Killeen, Texas
- KRXQ in Sacramento, California
- KRXT in Rockdale, Texas
- KRYZ-LP in Mariposa, California
- KSAJ-FM in Burlingame, Kansas
- KTIS in Minneapolis, Minnesota
- KTJJ in Farmington, Missouri
- KTJM in Port Arthur, Texas
- KUFX in San Jose, California
- KURB in Little Rock, Arkansas
- KVOO in Tulsa, Oklahoma
- KVTT in Palisade, Colorado
- KWBY-FM in Ranger, Texas
- KWEB-LP in Webb City, Missouri
- KWKJ in Windsor, Missouri
- KWYG-LP in Cheyenne, Wyoming
- KXGC-LP in Flagstaff, Arizona
- KXGV-LP in Garden Valley, Idaho
- KXWI in Williston, North Dakota
- KYGO in Denver, Colorado
- KZID in Orofino, Idaho
- WACL in Elkton, Virginia
- WBBO in Ocean Acres, New Jersey
- WBON in Westhampton, New York
- WBZ in Boston, Massachusetts
- WBZF in Hartsville, South Carolina
- WCKM in Lake George, New York
- WCMO in Marietta, Ohio
- WCTW in Catskill, New York
- WDAI in Pawleys Island, South Carolina
- WDWG in Rocky Mount, North Carolina
- WEBB in Waterville, Maine
- WFFY in San Carlos Park, Florida
- WFSY in Panama City, Florida
- WGYI in Oil City, Pennsylvania
- WHPB-LP in Orlando, Florida
- WHUM-LP in Columbus, Indiana
- WINF-LP in Delaware, Ohio
- WINL in Linden, Alabama
- WJHI-LP in Jeffersonville, Indiana
- WJTE-LP in East Berstadt, Kentucky
- WJYN-LP in North Philadelphia, Pennsylvania
- WKEM-LP in Montgomery, Alabama
- WKRZ in Freeland, Pennsylvania
- WKSE in Niagara Falls, New York
- WKSW in Cookeville, Tennessee
- WKTK in Crystal River, Florida
- WLPF in Ocilla, Georgia
- WLSB in Augusta, Illinois
- WMYK in Peru, Indiana
- WNCX in Cleveland, Ohio
- WNUW-LP in Aston, Pennsylvania
- WNWN in Coldwater, Michigan
- WNYR in Waterloo, New York
- WOMG in Lexington, South Carolina
- WPIA in Eureka, Illinois
- WQAZ-LP in Edmond, West Virginia
- WQEW-LP in Philadelphia, Pennsylvania
- WQKZ in Ferdinand, Indiana
- WQLH in Green Bay, Wisconsin
- WRPE-LP in Jacksonville, Florida
- WRRM in Cincinnati, Ohio
- WSAX-LP in Columbus, Ohio
- WSB in Atlanta, Georgia
- WSBH in Satellite Beach, Florida
- WSHI-LP in Shelbyville, Indiana
- WTFM in Kingsport, Tennessee
- WUPS in Houghton Lake, Michigan
- WUSX in Seaford, Delaware
- WVHV-LP in Harrisville, West Virginia
- WWVR in Paris, Illinois
- WXPM-LP in Phoenixville, Pennsylvania
- WXXQ in Freeport, Illinois
- WYCR in York-Hanover, Pennsylvania
- WYLD in New Orleans, Louisiana
- WYRA in Confluence, Pennsylvania
- WYTX-LP in Rock Hill, South Carolina
- WZDK-LP in Decatur, Alabama
- WZLQ in Tupelo, Mississippi

== Venezuela ==
- RadioTrafico, 24-hour Spanish radio station delivering traffic information for Valencia.

== Vietnam ==
- Da Nang radio and VOH 99.9 in Da Nang city
