= WNUW =

WNUW may refer to:

- WNUW-LP, a low-power radio station (98.5 FM) licensed to serve Aston, Pennsylvania, United States
- WPEN (FM), a radio station (97.5 FM) licensed to serve Burlington, New Jersey, United States, which held the call sign WNUW from 2008 to 2009
- WMYX-FM, a radio station (99.1 FM) licensed to serve Milwaukee, Wisconsin, United States, which held the call sign WNUW from 1970 to 1981
