= KOLS =

KOLS may refer to:

- Nogales International Airport (United States) (ICAO code KOLS)
- KOLS-LP, a low-power radio station (98.5 FM) licensed to serve Oakhurst, California, United States
