= WINF (disambiguation) =

WINF-LP is a radio station (98.5 FM) licensed to Delaware, Ohio, United States. It may also refer to the following broadcasting stations in the United States:

- WNEZ, a radio station (1230 AM) licensed to Manchester, Connecticut, which held the call sign WINF from 1958 to 1984
- WQBQ, a radio station (1410 AM) licensed to Leesburg, Florida, which held the call sign WINF from 1985 to 1986
- WKDW (AM), a radio station (900 AM) licensed to Staunton, Virginia, which held the call sign WINF from 1994 to 1996
- WKCI (AM), a radio station (970 AM) licensed to Conway, South Carolina, which held the call sign WINF from 1996 to 2001
