= Kalibo Bridge III =

Two-lane highway bridge in Philippines

- Coordinates: 11°40′41″N 122°20′39″E
- Carries: Lezo-Kalibo Road
- Crosses: Aklan River
- Locale: Kalibo—Lezo, Aklan
- Other name(s): Lezo-Tigayon Bridge
- Maintained by: DPWH REGION VI

Characteristics
- Material: Concrete
- Total length: 770 m (2,530 ft)

History
- Construction start: 2013
- Construction end: January 2020
- Opened: January 16, 2020

The Kalibo Bridge III, also known as simply the Kalibo Bridge is a 770 m (2,530 ft) two-lane highway bridge which spans the Aklan River and connects the municipalities of Kalibo and Lezo in Aklan, Philippines. It is part of the Kalibo Circumferential Road and was inaugurated on January 16, 2020.
