= K-Hits =

Many radio stations currently use the brand K-Hits:

- WBMX, Chicago, Illinois, USA
- KHTT, Tulsa, Oklahoma, USA
- KADD, Logandale, Nevada, USA
- KTHI, Caldwell, Idaho, USA
- KHYT, Tucson, Arizona, USA
- KPKL, Deer Park, Washington, USA
- KZID, Culdesac, Idaho, USA
- KHTE-FM, Little Rock, Arkansas, USA
- KCCL, Woodland, California, United States

Stations that used to use this branding:

- KHIT-FM, Madera, California, USA
- KHTZ, Los Angeles, California, USA
- KGLK, Lake Jackson, Texas, USA
- KHHT, Denver, Colorado, USA
- KIHT, St. Louis, Missouri, USA
- KLTH, Portland, Oregon, USA
- KMJE (FM), Placerville, California, USA
- KMXP, Phoenix, Arizona, USA
- KLYY, Riverside, California, USA
