= Bakhawan Eco-Park =

Mangrove forest located in Kalibo, Aklan, Philippines

Coordinates: 11.7181°N 122.3856°E

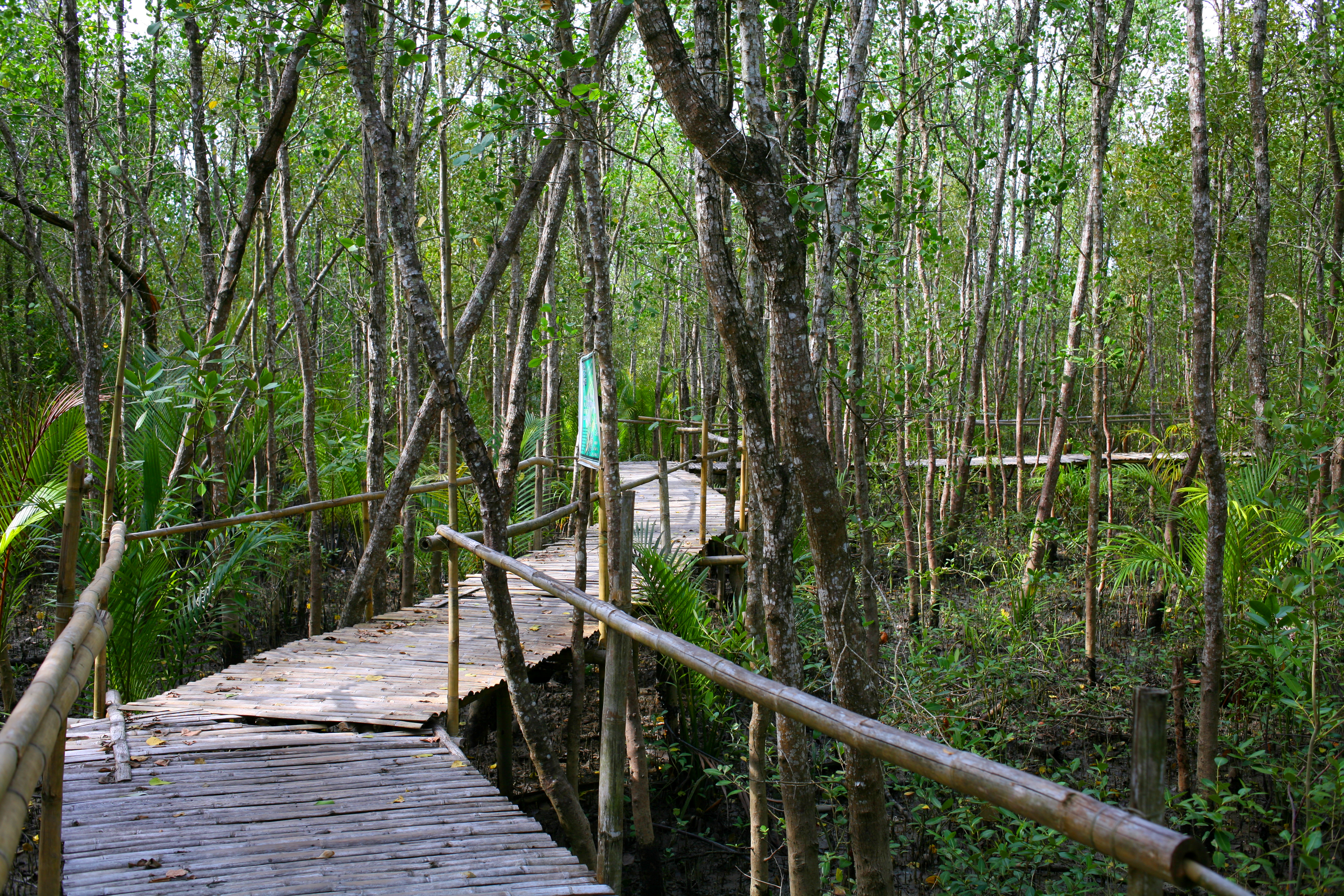
The 1.3-kilometer long bamboo bridge of the Bakhawan Eco-Park

The Bakhawan Eco-Park is a 220 hectares (540 acres) mangrove forest located in Kalibo, Aklan, Philippines. The mangrove reforestation project started in 1990 when the local government and several non-government organizations transformed the muddy shoreline of Barangay New Buswang into a mangrove reforestation site to prevent flood and storm surges in the community. The park is dubbed as the Philippines' most successful mangrove reforestation project. The Eco-park is operated by the Kalibo Save the Mangroves Association (KASAMA). The word "bakhawan", in the local dialect, means "mangrove".

== History ==
The Bakhawan Eco-Park was created on 1990, the purpose of the reforestation project was to prevent floods and storm surges during bad weather in the local community. The reforestation project started with 50 hectares (120 acres) of reclaimed land in Barangay New Buswang created by the Kalibo Save The Mangroves Association (KASAMA), a non-government organization, with the help of the local government of Kalibo, Aklan and the Department of Environment and Natural Resources (DENR). The mangrove reforestation project did not only address the community’s flood problems but it also gave a means of livelihood for the local people in the area. The project was hailed as one of the exemplary forests managed in the whole of Asia and the Pacific by the United Nations Food and Agriculture Organization.

On January 22, 2014, the Provincial Capitol of Aklan, headed by the Economic Enterprise Development Department, planted 8,000 new mangrove propagules on a 2 hectares (4.9 acres) area of the Eco-park. The mangrove-planting activity was aimed to minimize climate change and to replace the mangrove trees that were destroyed due to Typhoon Haiyan (Yolanda).

== Features ==
Today, the Bakhawan Eco-Park is considered as one of the most popular tourist attractions in Kalibo. The centerpiece of the Eco-Park is a 1.3 kilometres (0.81 mi) bamboo trail that takes visitors deep into the mangrove forest. The park is an ideal destination for ecotourism, it is home to different species of mangrove trees and it serves as a sanctuary for various types of birds and marine species. Other features in the park includes a watchtower, souvenir shop, canteen, massage area, charcoal briquetting, picnic huts and a Center for International Mangrove Studies.

== Gallery ==
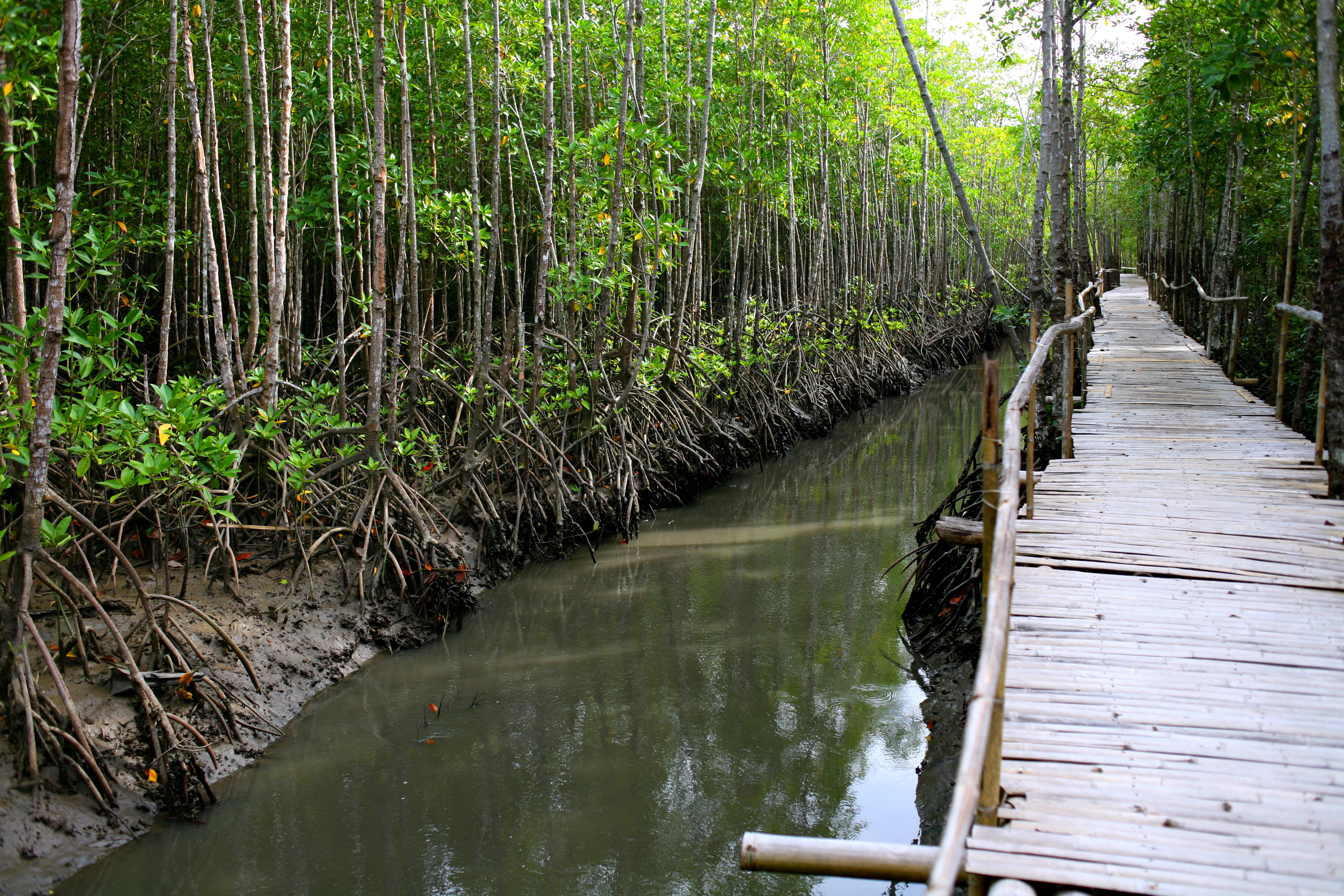
Mangroves near a channel

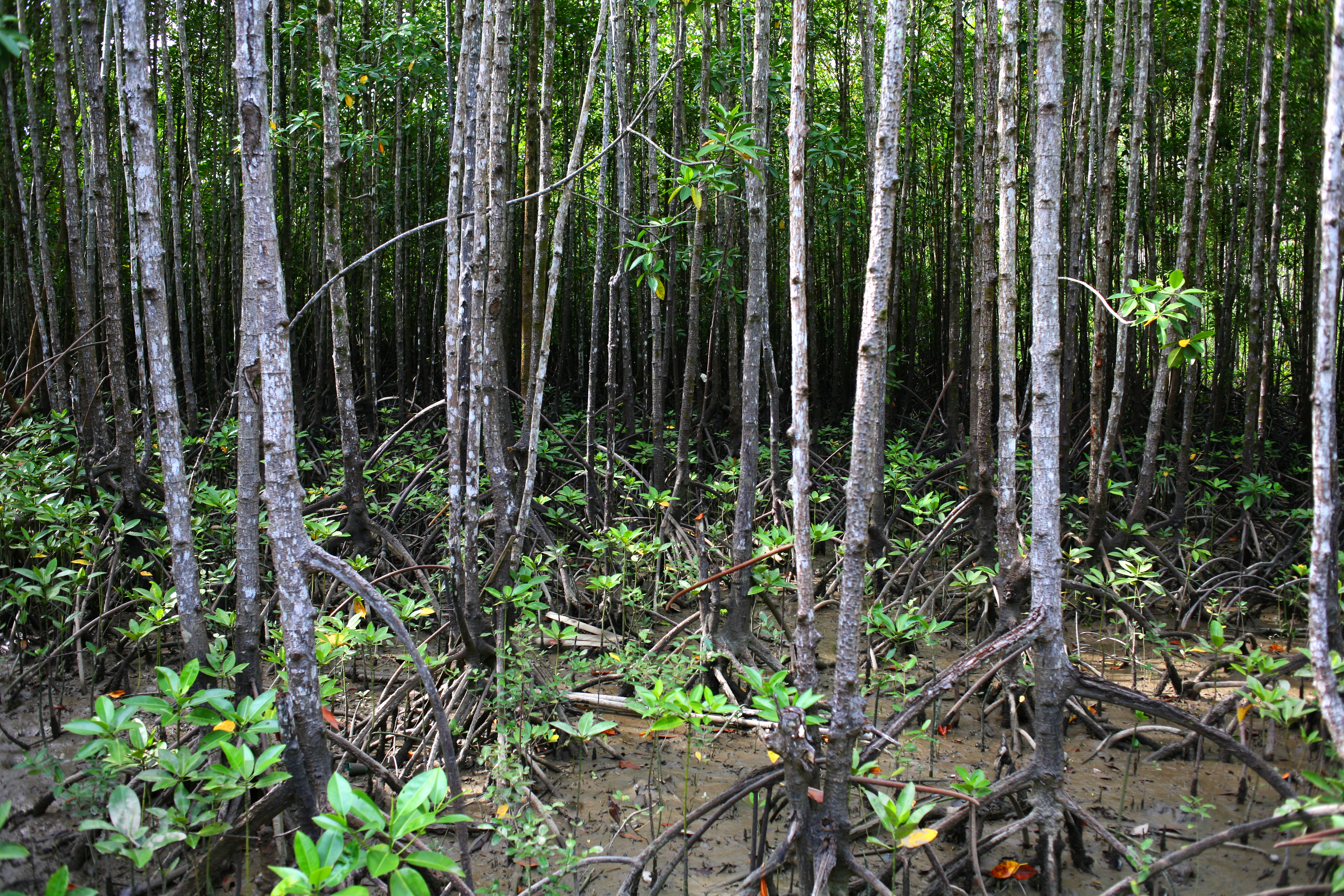
View of the mangroves at the Bakhawan Eco-Park
