= Lezo, Aklan =

Municipality in Aklan, Philippines

Lezo Tierra Alta
- Municipality
- Municipality of Lezo
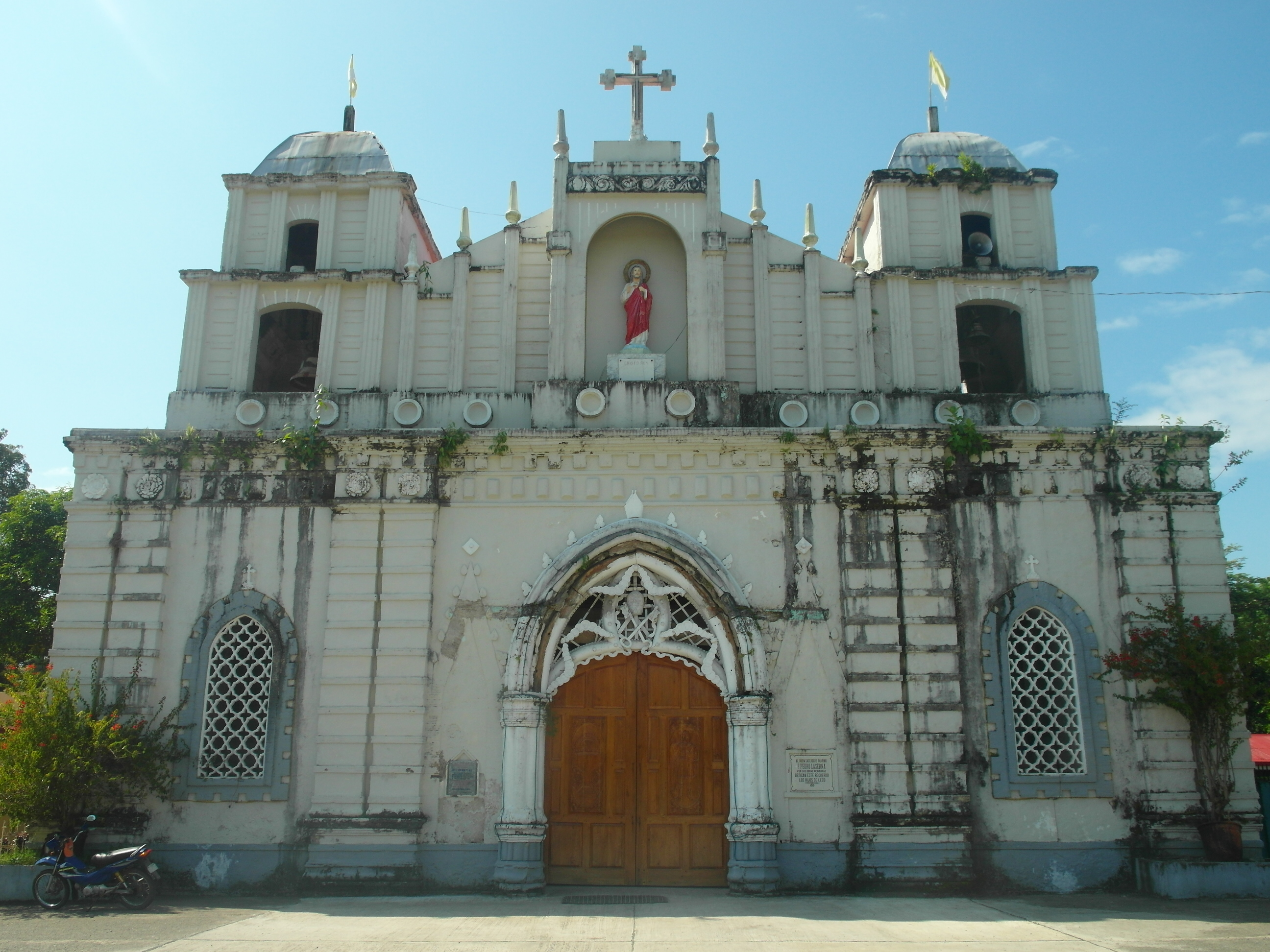
- Church of Lezo

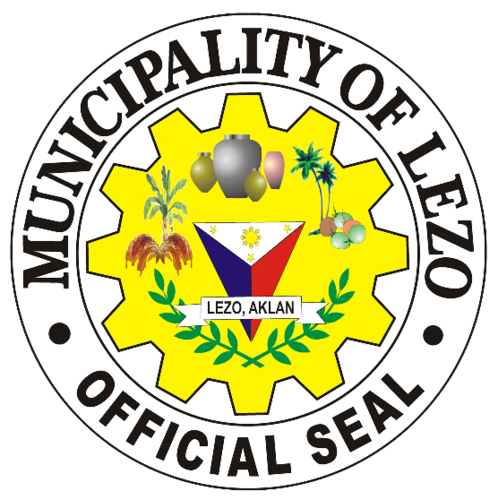
- Seal

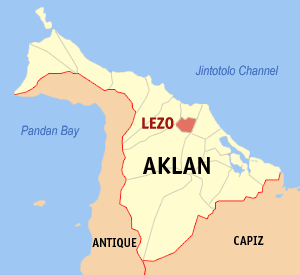
- Map of Aklan with Lezo highlighted
- Interactive map of Lezo
- Location within the Philippines
- Coordinates: 11°40′11″N 122°19′37″E
- Country: Philippines
- Region: Western Visayas
- Province: Aklan
- District: 2nd district
- Barangays: 12 (see Barangays)

Government
  - Type: Sangguniang Bayan
  - Mayor: Meekia F. Icasas
  - Vice Mayor: Mary Lenette R. Fernandez
  - Representative: Florencio T. Miraflores
  - Municipal Council: Members: Mary Lucy R. Dela Cruz; George R. Villarubia; Peter Cyril F. Besana; Ulysses R. Irabon; Rafael M. Silverio; Josephine C. Buenaflor; Rodulfo M. Taran; Ermeda L. Morales=
  - Electorate: 10,187 voters (2025)

Area
  - Total: 23.40 km^{2} (9.03 sq mi)
- Elevation: 22 m (72 ft)
- Highest elevation: 189 m (620 ft)
- Lowest elevation: 2 m (6.6 ft)

Population (2024 census)
  - Total: 16,200
  - Density: 692/km^{2} (1,790/sq mi)
  - Households: 3,916

Economy
  - Income class: 4th municipal income class
  - Poverty incidence: 5.59% (2023)
  - Revenue: ₱ 95.92 million (2024)
  - Assets: ₱ 249.8 million (2024)
  - Expenditure: ₱ 96.57 million (2024)
  - Liabilities: ₱ 61.82 million (2024)

Service provider
  - Electricity: Aklan Electric Cooperative (AKELCO)
  - Water: Numancia Water District, Malinao Water District
  - Telecommunications: Panay Telephone Corporation (Pantelco), Smart, TNT, Globe, TM, Dito, PLDT, Converge
  - Cable TV: Kalibo Cable TV Network, Aklan Cable TV Network
- Time zone: UTC+8 (PST)
- ZIP code: 5605
- PSGC: 060408000
- IDD : area code: +63 (0)36
- Native languages: Aklanon; Hiligaynon; Tagalog
- Website: lezo.gov.ph

Lezo, officially the Municipality of Lezo (Aklanon: Banwa it Lezo; Hiligaynon: Banwa sang Lezo; Tagalog: Bayan ng Lezo), is a municipality in the province of Aklan, Philippines. It is the smallest municipality in the province both by population and by land area, and even by revenue. According to the 2024 census, it has a population of 16,200 people.

The town is called the Pottery Capital of Aklan, for its long practice of clay making. The word bayangan refers to the potter's wheel used to form clay into different pottery items made in the town. For residents, bayangan also reflects the shaping of local values, customs, and heritage.

== History ==
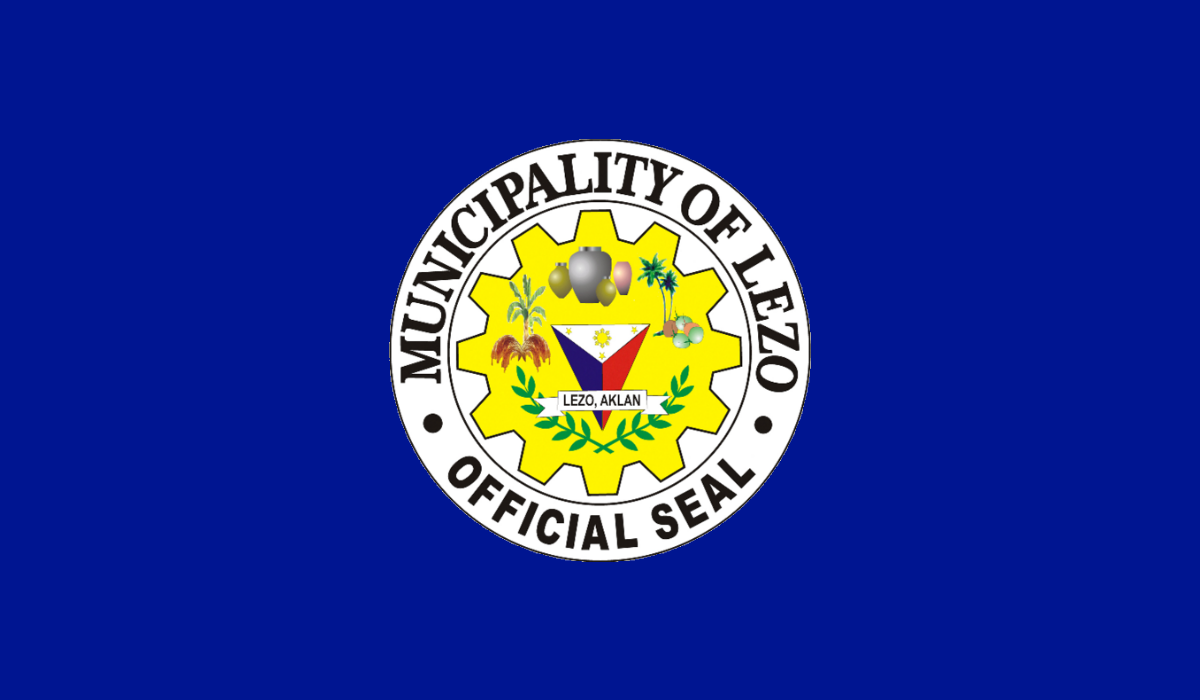
Variant flag of Lezo

Before its creation into an independent municipality, Lezo was a barrio in Kalibo called Guicod derived from the word "Guicab" which means "a cavern in a creek where eels were in abundance", and was also known as Tierra Alta meaning a "high land" because the town center was not inundated during the great flood of the early 19th century.

When the Americans came in 1899, the military government appointed Felix Kimpo as head of the Calivo (covering the present territory of Kalibo, Numancia and Lezo). During the election in 1901 he was elected as the president from 1901 to 1903. At that time there were 34 towns in the province of Capiz, but these were reduced to 24 towns by a law passed by the civil Commission when it was found out that some towns were incapable of meeting their financial obligations and maintenance. So on April 4, 1903, through Act No. 720 of the Philippine Commission, Lezo, along with Numancia, and Banga was annexed to Kalibo for decreased of revenue collections.

On July 31, 1909, the civil commission issued Executive Order No. 58 separating Lezo (that includes Numancia) from Kalibo and making Lezo as the seat of government. Numancia then, became a barrio of Lezo. On December 31, 1916, through Act No. 2657, Lezo was part of the second district of the province of Capiz. On March 10, 1917, through Act No. 2711 Lezo was part of the third district of Capiz. In 1920 the situation was reversed with regards to the status of Lezo and Numancia. By Executive Order No. 17, series of 1920, the seat of government was transferred to Numancia and Lezo became a barrio of Numancia.

With several petitions by the residents over the years to separate from Numancia, President Manuel Quezon signed Executive Order No. 364 dated August 28, 1941 converting Lezo into an independent municipality. The inauguration of Lezo as a separate municipality was scheduled in 1942, but due to the outbreak of World War II it was deferred to January 1, 1945.

== Geography ==
Lezo is located at 11°40′11″N 122°19′37″E. It is 11 kilometres (6.8 mi) from the provincial capital Kalibo.

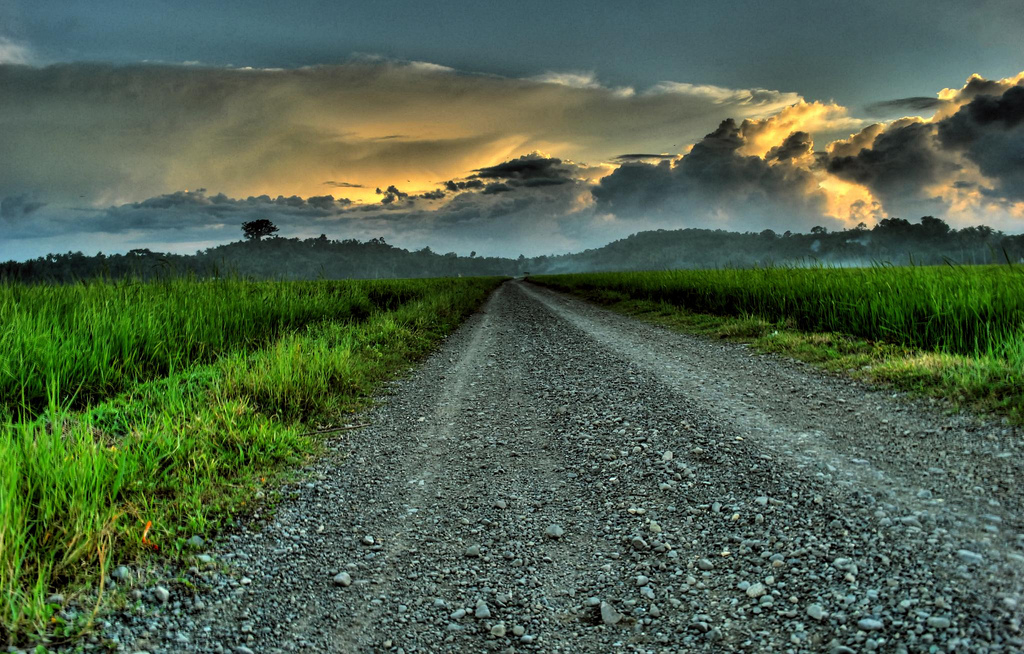
Lezo, Aklan

According to the Philippine Statistics Authority, the municipality has a land area of 23.40 square kilometres (9.03 sq mi) constituting 1.28% of the 1,821.42-square-kilometre- (703.25 sq mi) total area of Aklan.

=== Climate ===
Climate data for Lezo, Aklan
Month	Jan	Feb	Mar	Apr	May	Jun	Jul	Aug	Sep	Oct	Nov	Dec	Year
Mean daily maximum °C (°F)	28 (82)	29 (84)	30 (86)	32 (90)	32 (90)	30 (86)	29 (84)	29 (84)	29 (84)	29 (84)	29 (84)	28 (82)	30 (85)
Mean daily minimum °C (°F)	23 (73)	22 (72)	23 (73)	23 (73)	25 (77)	25 (77)	25 (77)	24 (75)	24 (75)	24 (75)	24 (75)	23 (73)	24 (75)
Average precipitation mm (inches)	47 (1.9)	33 (1.3)	39 (1.5)	48 (1.9)	98 (3.9)	150 (5.9)	169 (6.7)	147 (5.8)	163 (6.4)	172 (6.8)	118 (4.6)	80 (3.1)	1,264 (49.8)
Average rainy days	11.4	8.2	9.3	9.7	19.1	25.6	27.4	25.5	25.5	25.2	18.5	14.5	219.9
Source: Meteoblue

=== Barangays ===
Lezo is politically subdivided into 12 barangays. Each barangay consists of puroks and some have sitios.

PSGC	Barangay	Population			±% p.a.	
		2024		2010		
060408001	Agcawilan	9.7%	1,565	1,351	▴	1.03%
060408002	Bagto	6.2%	997	1,027	▾	−0.21%
060408003	Bugasongan	7.6%	1,231	1,183	▴	0.28%
060408004	Carugdog	8.8%	1,428	1,369	▴	0.29%
060408005	Cogon	6.0%	970	893	▴	0.58%
060408006	Ibao	8.7%	1,413	1,317	▴	0.49%
060408007	Mina	7.1%	1,158	1,052	▴	0.67%
060408008	Poblacion	12.2%	1,975	2,113	▾	−0.47%
060408009	Santa Cruz	7.6%	1,238	1,132	▴	0.62%
060408010	Santa Cruz Bigaa	6.7%	1,086	1,038	▴	0.31%
060408011	Silakat-Nonok	5.7%	919	856	▴	0.49%
060408012	Tayhawan	7.7%	1,244	1,187	▴	0.33%
	Total		16,200	14,518	▴	0.76%

== Demographics ==
Population census of Lezo
Year	Pop.	±% p.a.
1903	3,612	—
1918	11,503	+8.03%
1948	6,008	−2.14%
1960	5,942	−0.09%
1970	6,890	+1.49%
1975	8,224	+3.61%
1980	9,625	+3.19%
1990	10,343	+0.72%
1995	11,536	+2.07%
2000	12,393	+1.55%
2007	13,077	+0.74%
2010	14,518	+3.88%
2015	15,224	+0.91%
2020	15,639	+0.57%
2024	16,200	+0.85%
Source: Philippine Statistics Authority

In the 2024 census, Lezo had a population of 16,200. The population density was 690 inhabitants per square kilometre (1,800/sq mi).

== Economy ==
Poverty incidence of Lezo (%)

Source: Philippine Statistics Authority

== Education ==
The Lezo Schools District Office governs all educational institutions within the municipality. It oversees the management and operations of all private and public, from primary to secondary schools.

=== Primary and elementary schools ===
- Agcawilan Silakat Nonok Elementary School
- Bugasongan Elementary School
- Ibao Elementary School
- Mga Apo ni San Isidro Catholic School
- Prudencio T. Yerro Elementary School
- Sta. Cruz Bigaa Elementary School
- Tayhawan Elementary School
- Uldario P. Custodio Elementary School

=== Secondary schools ===
- Catalino M. Prado National High School
- Lezo Integrated School
- Lezo Technical College

== Gallery ==
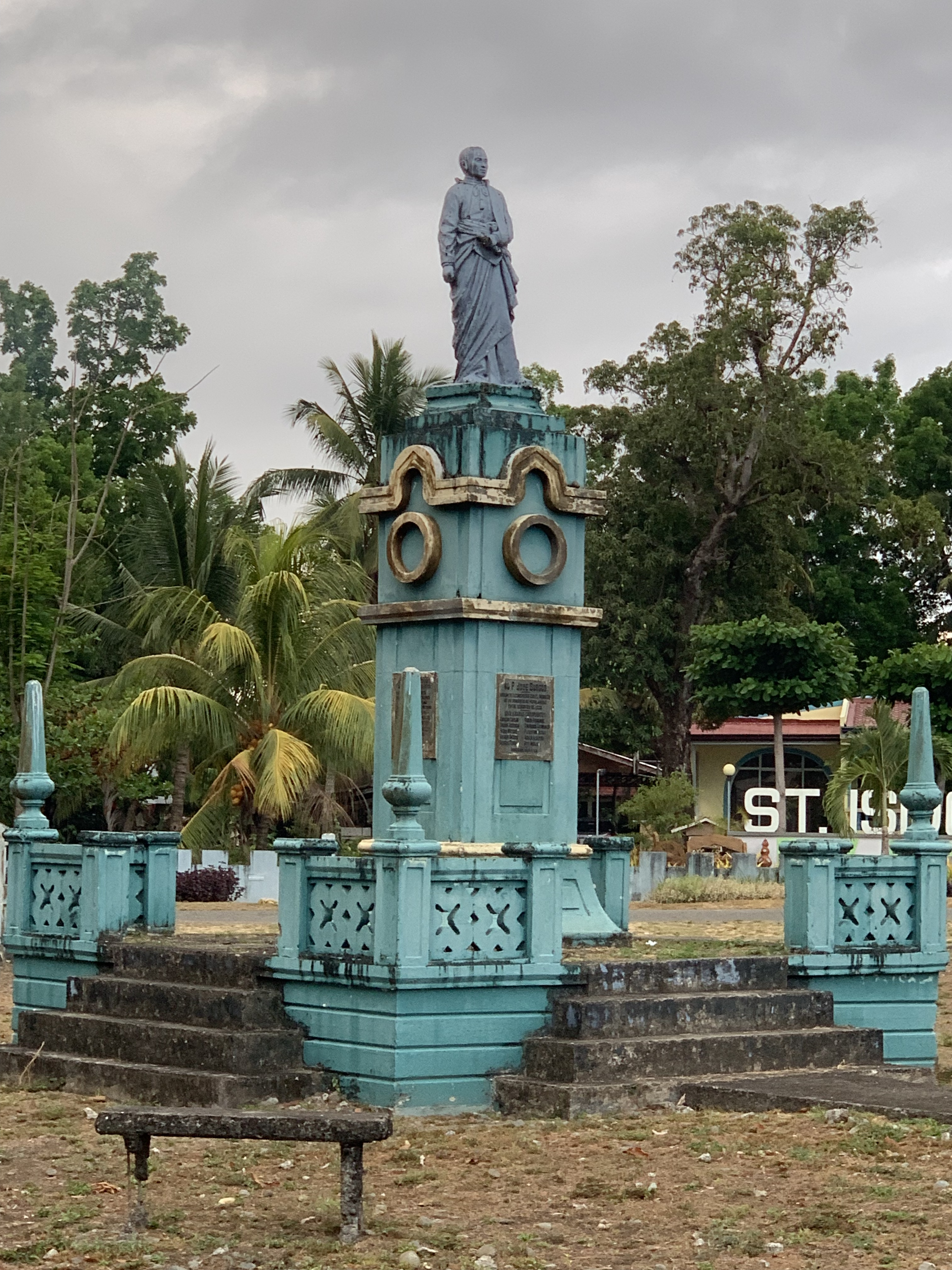
Town plaza in front of the Church

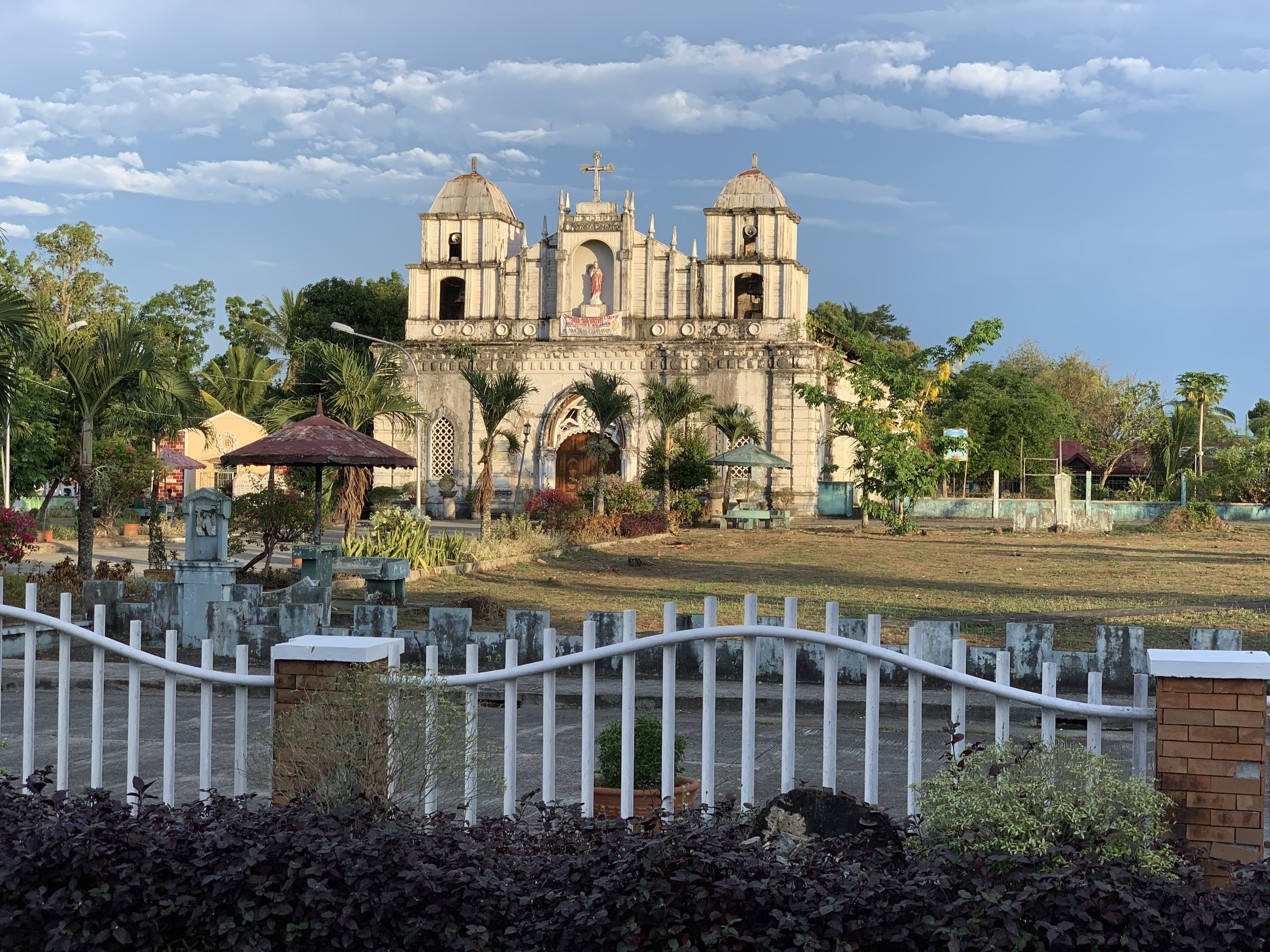
Church in Lezo
