= XHJS-FM =

Radio station in Hidalgo del Parral, Chihuahua, Mexico

- Hidalgo del Parral, Chihuahua; Mexico
- Frequency: 98.5 FM
- Branding: Euforia

Programming
- Format: Pop

Ownership
- Owner: VMedia Comunicaciones; (Eber Joel Beltrán Zamarrón)

History
- First air date: August 19, 1952

Technical information
- Licensing authority: CRT
- Class: B1
- ERP: 25 kW
- HAAT: 152.17 m (499.2 ft)
- Transmitter coordinates: 26°56′10″N 105°38′00″W

Links
- Webcast: Listen live
- Website: vmediacomunicaciones.com

XHJS-FM is a radio station on 98.5 FM in Hidalgo del Parral, Chihuahua, Mexico. It is owned by VMedia Comunicaciones and carries a pop format known as Euforia.

== History ==
XEJS-AM 1150 received its concession on June 5, 1949. It was owned until 2015 by Cadena Radiodifusora de Chihuahua, S.A., in its later years a subsidiary of Radiorama. In 2015, the concession was transferred to Israel Beltrán Montes of Grupo BM Radio.

In the late 2000s, XEJS was operated by Otto Valles Baca. Under his ownership, XEJS was combined with the local television station, XHJMA-TV channel 3. As XHJMA did not have a concession, the combined station was raided in 2008 by federal agents.

XEJS received approval to migrate to FM in 2011.
