= XHZI-FM =

Radio station in Zacapu, Michoacán

- Zacapu, Michoacán; Mexico
- Frequency: 98.5 FM
- Branding: La Z

Programming
- Format: Regional Mexican
- Affiliations: Grupo Radio Centro

Ownership
- Owner: Grupo TRENU; (Organización Apric, S.A. de C.V.)

History
- First air date: January 24, 1964 (concession)

Technical information
- Class: B1
- ERP: 25 kW
- HAAT: -184 meters
- Transmitter coordinates: 19°48′58″N 101°47′14″W

XHZI-FM is a radio station on 98.5 FM in Zacapu, Michoacán. It is owned by Grupo TRENU and affiliated with Grupo Radio Centro, and carries a Regional Mexican format known as La Z.

== History ==
Logo as Maxistar used until 2018

XEZI-AM received its concession on January 24, 1964. It broadcast with 1,000 watts on 1200 kHz and was owned by Guillermo Calzada Cervantes. Organización Apric acquired the station in 1987.

In the 1990s, XEZI was moved to 850 kHz.

XEZI received its approval to migrate to FM in 2013 as XHZI-FM on 98.5.
