= WQAZ-LP =

- Edmond, West Virginia; United States
- Broadcast area: Central Fayette County, West Virginia
- Frequency: 98.5 MHz

Programming
- Format: Variety

Ownership
- Owner: The Syner Foundation

History
- First air date: March 15, 2005
- Former call signs: WWAR-LP (2003, CP)

Technical information
- Licensing authority: FCC
- Facility ID: 134635
- Class: L1
- ERP: 5 watts
- HAAT: 126 meters (413 ft)
- Transmitter coordinates: 38°3′37.0″N 80°59′34.0″W

Links
- Public license information: LMS

WQAZ-LP is a Variety formatted broadcast radio station licensed to Edmond, West Virginia and serving Central Fayette County, West Virginia. WQAZ-LP is owned and operated by The Syner Foundation.

== Fined ==
On February 26, 2015, The Syner Foundation, owner of WQAZ-LP, was fined $16,000 by the Federal Communications Commission (FCC) for "broadcast[ing] announcements that promoted the products, services or businesses of its financial contributors."
