= XHYQ-FM =

Radio station in Fresnillo, Zacatecas, Mexico

- Fresnillo, Zacatecas; Mexico
- Frequency: 98.5 FM
- Branding: La Rancherita

Programming
- Format: Regional Mexican

Ownership
- Owner: Grupo Radiofónico ZER; (Ralla Zacatecana, S.A. de C.V.)

History
- First air date: September 28, 1978 (concession)

Technical information
- Licensing authority: CRT
- Class: B1
- ERP: 3 kW
- HAAT: −9.4 m (−31 ft)
- Transmitter coordinates: 23°10′29″N 102°52′12″W

Links
- Webcast: XHYQ-FM
- Website: grupozer.mx

XHYQ-FM is a radio station on 98.5 FM in Fresnillo, Zacatecas. It is owned by Grupo Radiofónico Zer and carries a Regional Mexican format known as La Rancherita.

== History ==
XEYQ-AM 1500 received its concession on September 28, 1978. It was owned by Edmundo Llamas Félix and broadcast with 5,000 watts during the day and 150 watts at night. XEYQ was sold to Radio Comunicación de Zacatecas in 1997, which moved it to 640 kHz and upgraded nighttime power to 1,000 watts. Ralla Zacatecana became the concessionaire in the early 2000s.

XEYQ was cleared to migrate to FM in November 2010 as XHYQ-FM on 98.5.
