= DYYM =

Radio station in the Philippines

Radyo Natin Kalibo (DYYM)
Kalibo; Philippines
- Broadcast area: Northern Aklan
- Frequency: 98.5 MHz
- Branding: 98.5 Radyo Natin

Programming
- Languages: Akeanon, Filipino
- Format: Community radio
- Network: Radyo Natin Network

Ownership
- Owner: MBC Media Group
- Operator: Kalibo Municipal Government

History
- First air date: 2002
- Former names: Hot FM (2002–2016)

Technical information
- Licensing authority: NTC
- Power: 1,000 watts
- ERP: 5,000 watts

DYYM (98.5 FM), broadcasting as 98.5 Radyo Natin, is a radio station owned by MBC Media Group and operated by the Municipal Government of Kalibo. Its studios are located along United Veterans Ave., Brgy. Poblacion, Kalibo.
