= WJTE-LP =

- East Bernstadt, Kentucky; United States
- Broadcast area: London, Kentucky
- Frequency: 98.5 MHz
- Branding: The Light Of London

Programming
- Format: Southern gospel

Ownership
- Owner: The Light of London

History
- First air date: August 3, 2017 (as WJTE-LP), 2003 (as WJJA-LP)
- Former call signs: WJJA-LP (2003–2017)

Technical information
- Licensing authority: FCC
- Facility ID: 133924
- Class: L1
- Power: 9 watts
- HAAT: 94.9 meters
- Transmitter coordinates: 37°12′32.00″N 84°9′0.00″W

Links
- Public license information: LMS
- Webcast: Listen Live
- Website: Official Website

WJTE-LP (98.5 FM) is a radio station licensed to East Bernstadt, Kentucky, United States, broadcasting a Southern gospel format. The station is currently owned by The Light of London.

== Current Programming ==
WJTE airs a mix of current and classic southern gospel and Christian country music, along with some lighter Contemporary Christian music. In 2018, the station launched a miniseries called "Spotlight On Laurel: Her History And Her People", an oral history collection featuring interviews with prominent residents who have made an impact on the community.
