= Edmond, West Virginia =

Unincorporated community in West Virginia, US

Coordinates: 38°03′44″N 81°01′38″W

Edmond is an unincorporated community in Fayette County, in the U.S. state of West Virginia.

== History ==
The community derives its name from Eddie Ryan, an early postmaster's son.
