= Radio UNAL =

Radio station of the National University of Colombia in Bogotá and Medellín

Coordinates: 4.639476°N 74.090343°W

Colombia
- Broadcast area: Bogotá; Medellín; Manizales (part-time, 2015-2019); Worldwide (online)
- Frequencies: 98.5 MHz (Bogotá); 100.4 MHz (Medellín)
- Branding: UN Radio (1991–2021); Call signs: HJUN (Bogotá); HJG51 (Medellín)

Programming
- Format: University radio, culture
- Affiliations: University Radio Network of Colombia

Ownership
- Owner: National University of Colombia

History
- First air date: 1991 (Bogotá); 2002 (Medellín)
- Former call signs: HJYV
- Former frequencies: 97.4 MHz (Bogotá, 1991-1994)

Links
- Website: http://www.unradio.unal.edu.co/

Radio UNAL (until February 2021 branded UN Radio) is the radio station of the National University of Colombia in Bogotá (since 22 September 1991) and Medellín (since 30 July 2002). It broadcasts academic programming, news analysis, music, and cultural events related to the university. Radio UNAL syndicates some programmes from Radio France Internationale and DW Radio.

Its morning drive flagship news programme is Análisis UNAL (until February 2021 UN Análisis), broadcast on weekdays in two segments: international news (from 06:00 to 07:30) and an analytic segment (from 08:00 to 09:00) with scholars and experts; each day a different subject is dealt with (Mondays: politics; Tuesdays: social issues; Wednesdays: science and technology; Thursdays: economy; Fridays: culture).

Between 2015 and 2019, selected programming is broadcast on Caldas FM, a public station in Manizales owned by the Governor's Office of Caldas.

Radio UNAL Web (until February 2021 UN Radio Web), Radio UNAL's online only station, is devoted to broadcasting recorded academic lectures.

== Stations ==
=== Owned and operated ===
==== Over the air ====
- Radio UNAL Bogotá: HJUN 98.5 MHz
- Radio UNAL Medellín: HJG51 100.4 MHz

==== Online ====
- Radio UNAL Web

=== Affiliates ===
- Manizales: HJI42 96.3 MHz (Caldas FM, selected programming, 2015-2019)
