= KWKJ =

Radio station in Windsor, Missouri

- Windsor, Missouri; United States
- Broadcast area: Sedalia, Missouri; Clinton, Missouri; Warrensburg, Missouri
- Frequency: 98.5 MHz
- Branding: 98.5 The Bar

Programming
- Format: Country music

Ownership
- Owner: D & H Media, LLC

History
- First air date: 2002

Technical information
- Licensing authority: FCC
- Facility ID: 39629
- Class: C2
- ERP: 44,000 watts
- HAAT: 163 meters (535 ft)
- Transmitter coordinates: 38°35′38″N 93°31′29″W

Links
- Public license information: Public file; LMS
- Webcast: Listen live
- Website: warrensburgradio.com

KWKJ is a radio station airing a country music format licensed to Windsor, Missouri, broadcasting on 98.5 FM. The station is owned by D & H Media, LLC.
