= WYTX-LP =

- Rock Hill, South Carolina; United States
- Broadcast area: Metro Rock Hill
- Frequency: 98.5 MHz
- Branding: "98-5 YTX"

Programming
- Format: Variety

Ownership
- Owner: York Technical College

History
- First air date: July 9, 2015
- Former call signs: WYTX-LP (2014–Present)
- Call sign meaning: W York Technical (College) X

Technical information
- Licensing authority: FCC
- Facility ID: 196642
- Class: L1
- Power: 88.4 watts
- HAAT: 31.7 meters (104 ft)
- Transmitter coordinates: 34°56′9.0″N 80°59′37.0″W

Links
- Public license information: LMS
- Webcast: Listen Live
- Website: WYTX-LP Online

WYTX-LP (98.5 FM) is an Adult Album Alternative formatted broadcast radio station licensed to and serving Rock Hill, South Carolina. WYTX-LP is owned and operated by York Technical College.

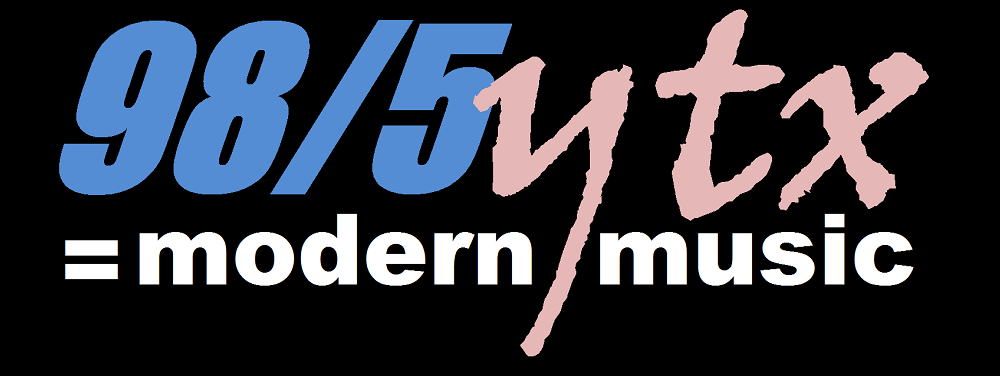
Former logo
