= WVHV-LP =

- Harrisville, West Virginia; United States
- Broadcast area: Metro Harrisville
- Frequency: 98.5 MHz

Programming
- Format: Variety

Ownership
- Owner: Ritchie Progress Alliance, Inc.

History
- First air date: October 3, 2014
- Call sign meaning: West Virginia Harrisville

Technical information
- Licensing authority: FCC
- Facility ID: 192313
- Class: L1
- ERP: 11 watts
- HAAT: 87.9 meters (288 ft)
- Transmitter coordinates: 39°12′18.0″N 81°2′29.0″W

Links
- Public license information: LMS

WVHV-LP is a Variety formatted broadcast radio station licensed to and serving Harrisville, West Virginia. WVHV-LP is owned and operated by Ritchie Progress Alliance, Inc.
