= KRFM =

Coordinates: 34.206°N 109.941°W

- Show Low, Arizona; United States
- Broadcast area: White Mountains (Arizona)
- Frequency: 98.5 MHz
- Branding: Mix 98.5

Programming
- Format: Adult contemporary

Ownership
- Owner: Petracom of Holbrook, LLC

History
- First air date: 1983 (at 96.5)
- Former frequencies: 96.5 MHz (1983–2017)

Technical information
- Licensing authority: FCC
- Facility ID: 33692
- Class: C0
- ERP: 100,000 watts
- HAAT: 303 meters (994 ft)

Links
- Public license information: Public file; LMS
- Webcast: Listen Live
- Website: 985krfm.com

KRFM is a commercial adult contemporary music radio station in Show Low, Arizona, broadcasting on 98.5 FM. It is owned by Petracom of Holbrook, LLC. Unlike many commercial stations in the area, the station features no satellite-syndicated content, and instead all programming is generated locally.

== History ==
The call letters KRFM were originally assigned to an Easy Listening station in Phoenix, Arizona (now KYOT). When the station changed its call letters in the mid-1980s, an Easy Listening station was launched in Show Low with the KRFM call letters. As of 2013, the station features a morning show called "Tommy Boy in The Morning".

On August 10, 2017, at 2 pm KRFM moved from 96.5 FM to 98.5 FM. The station was licensed to operate at 98.5 FM on August 18, 2017.
