= KRXT =

Radio station in Rockdale, Texas

Coordinates: 30.642°N 97.037°W

- Taylor, Texas; United States
- Frequency: 98.5 MHz
- Branding: 98.5 KRXT. Rockdale Taylor Cameron

Programming
- Format: Classic Country-Polka-News-Weather-Sports

Ownership
- Owner: Cowboy Broadcast Network

History
- First air date: 1989
- Call sign meaning: Rockdale; XT=jumbled TX ("Texas")

Technical information
- Licensing authority: FCC
- Facility ID: 35572
- Class: A
- ERP: 6,000 watts
- HAAT: 100 m (328 ft)

Links
- Public license information: Public file; LMS
- Website: krxt985.com

KRXT is a Taylor, Texas, based radio station. It airs on 98.5 MHz and is under ownership of The Cowboy Broadcasting Network. This station airs a country music format.

The station was created and first aired in Rockdale, Texas, in 1989 by Charles "Charlie" McGregor. In September 2024 Charlie retired and sold the station to the Cowboy Broadcasting Network who moved the studios to Taylor, Texas. The stations tower remains at the original location in Rockdale, Texas.

Current shows found on KRXT include:

Monday-Friday

- 5:00 am – 6:30 am - Talking Texas Agriculture
- 7:00 am – 9:30 am - Local News and Sports with Jay Davis
- 7:00 am – 9:00 am - Rise & Shine Morning Show with Kenny Schneebeli
- 9:00 am – 11:00 am - Hometown Highlights
- 11:00 am – 1:00 pm - KRXT Polka Show
- 3:00 pm – 11:00 pm - Country Music
- 7:00 pm – 10:00 pm - Overnight Jukebox

Saturday

- 8:00 am – 9:00 am - On the Dock Fishing Report
- 7:45 am – 8:00 am - Grow With Frank
- 4:00 pm – 6:00 pm - Texas Troubadours with Montana Lane
- 6:00 pm – 10:00 pm - Ritmo Tejano with Roney Castor
- 10:00 pm – midnight - Tejano Gold Countdown

Sunday

- 6:00 am – 7:00 am - Sunday Morning Gospel
- 7:00 am – 1:30 am - Church Programming
- 2:00 pm – 5:00 pm - KRXT Sunday Polka Show
- 5:00 pm – 6:00 pm - The Dale Watson Show
- 6:00 pm – midnight - Country Music
