= XHTYL-FM =

Community radio station in Monterrey, Nuevo León

- Monterrey, Nuevo León; Mexico
- Frequency: 98.5 MHz
- Branding: Radio Tierra y Libertad

Programming
- Format: Community radio

Ownership
- Owner: Por la Igualdad Social, A.C.

History
- First air date: Summer 2001; June 6, 2010 (permit)
- Call sign meaning: Tierra Y Libertad

Technical information
- Licensing authority: CRT
- Class: A
- ERP: .600 kW
- HAAT: −32.4 meters (−106 ft)
- Transmitter coordinates: 25°44′26.0″N 100°20′19.5″W

Links
- Website: radiolameramera.blogspot.com

XHTYL-FM is a community radio station serving Monterrey, Nuevo León. Mexico. It broadcasts with 600 watts of power on 98.5 MHz and is known as Radio Tierra y Libertad. XHTYL is a member of AMARC México.

== History ==
The 1999 UNAM strike sowed the seeds for a number of community radio stations across Mexico, including XHTYL, XHECA-FM in Amecameca, and XHCD-FM in Hermosillo. During the strike, students operated a radio station known as "La Ke Huelga".

The Asociación Civil Tierra y Libertad, a civil association founded in 1973 in response to illegal land seizures, began operating its community radio station in the summer of 2001.

On June 6, 2008, the station was seized and taken off air by 150 members of the Mexican Federal Police, as it did not hold a permit to broadcast. The station began formulating an application for an official permit with Cofetel, which was granted in February 2010 along with several other applications from community radio groups across Mexico. On June 6, 2010, two years after being taken off air, the now-official XHTYL-FM came to air as a 20-watt Class D station.

In 2018, the Federal Telecommunications Institute approved a class increase for XHTYL that expanded the station's broadcast area and increased its effective radiated power to 600 watts.
