= WSBH =

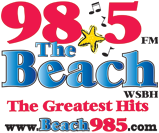
- Satellite Beach, Florida; United States
- Broadcast area: Melbourne, Florida
- Frequency: 98.5 MHz
- Branding: 98.5 The Beach

Programming
- Language: English
- Format: Classic hits

Ownership
- Owner: Roger Holler, III; (MARC Radio Orlando, LLC)

History
- First air date: 2006
- Call sign meaning: Satellite BeacH

Technical information
- Licensing authority: FCC
- Facility ID: 166009
- Class: A
- ERP: 6,000 watts
- HAAT: 100 meters (328 ft)
- Transmitter coordinates: 28°8′11.00″N 80°42′12.00″W

Links
- Public license information: Public file; LMS
- Webcast: Listen Live
- Website: beach985.com

WSBH (98.5 MHz) is a commercial FM radio station licensed to Satellite Beach, Florida and serving the Space Coast including Melbourne and Brevard County. The station is owned by Roger Holler, III, through licensee MARC Radio Orlando, LLC. It broadcasts a classic hits radio format.

WSBH has an effective radiated power (ERP) of 6,000 watts. It has a construction permit from the Federal Communications Commission to increase its power to 25,000 watts.
