= KQOV-LP =

Radio station in Butte, Montana, United States

Butte, Montana; United States
- Frequency: 98.5 MHz

Programming
- Format: Religious broadcasting

Ownership
- Owner: Queen of Victory (Brandon DeShaw, operator) Educational Radio Association

History
- First air date: 2005

Technical information
- Licensing authority: FCC
- Facility ID: 133299
- Class: L1
- ERP: 100 watts
- HAAT: 26.0 meters (85.3 ft)
- Transmitter coordinates: 46°1′41.00″N 112°32′4.00″W

Links
- Public license information: LMS

KQOV-LP (98.5 FM) is a radio station broadcasting a religious broadcasting format. Licensed to Butte, Montana, United States, the station serves the Butte area. The station is currently owned by Queen of Victory Educational Radio Association.
