= 4YOU =

Australian community radio station

Coordinates: 23.3749°S 150.5001°E

4YOU is an Australian community radio station located in Rockhampton, Queensland.

The station broadcasts to within a 100 km radius surrounding the Central Queensland city of Rockhampton on 98.5 FM. The station also streams internationally on their website.

4YOU is managed by Capricorn Community Radio Inc (originally known as the Capricorn Community Christian Broadcasting Society) and has been providing the community with a diverse range of local programs hosted by a team of volunteer announcers since the station's first broadcast in 1989.

The station received three nominations for awards at the 2016 CBAA Community Radio Awards, held in Melbourne on 12 November 2016.
