= One FM (Shepparton) =

One FM (3ONE)

Shepparton, Victoria; Australia
- Frequency: 98.5 MHz

Programming
- Format: Community radio

Ownership
- Owner: Goulburn Valley Community Radio Inc

History
- First air date: 1989

Technical information
- Licensing authority: ACMA
- ERP: 10,000 watts
- Transmitter coordinates: 36.362°S 145.698°E

Links
- Public licence information: Profile
- Website: www.fm985.com.au

One FM (call sign 3ONE) is a community radio station in Shepparton, Victoria, Australia. The radio station was established in 1980 and licensed for permanent full-time operation in 1989.

== On air identification ==
Based in Shepparton, ONE FM 98.5 is considered to be one of the largest community radio stations in regional Australia. The radio station produces predominantly live local content for listeners in the Shepparton region.

The station has resumed the on-air use of its registered callsign, now identifying as "ONE FM 98.5". The change was made following local surveys (within Shepparton and surrounding areas) indicating the community generally referred to the radio station as "ONE FM" as opposed to the previously used frequency only identifier. The management opted to return the ONE FM brand to the station logos and promotional material and on-air.

== Community radio ==
ONE FM is a community broadcast station and is predominantly operated and managed by volunteers. Programs include regular music and spoken word programs and live-to-air Goulburn Valley Football League matches, results and more.

ONE FM’s broadcast coverage area extends to approximately 30 km from Mt Major, reaching Euroa, Nagambie, Benalla and other smaller regional towns surrounding Shepparton.

== Affiliations ==
ONE FM is a member of the Community Broadcasting Association of Australia, and broadcasts according to the Community Radio Codes of Practice (Issued by the ACMA in association with the CBAA)

The radio station was originally identified on-air as "ONE FM", however for a three-year period was identified simply by its frequency. In late 2009, the ONE FM identifier returned to the station’s broadcasts and to its printed promotional material.

== Images ==
ONE FM 98.5 Building

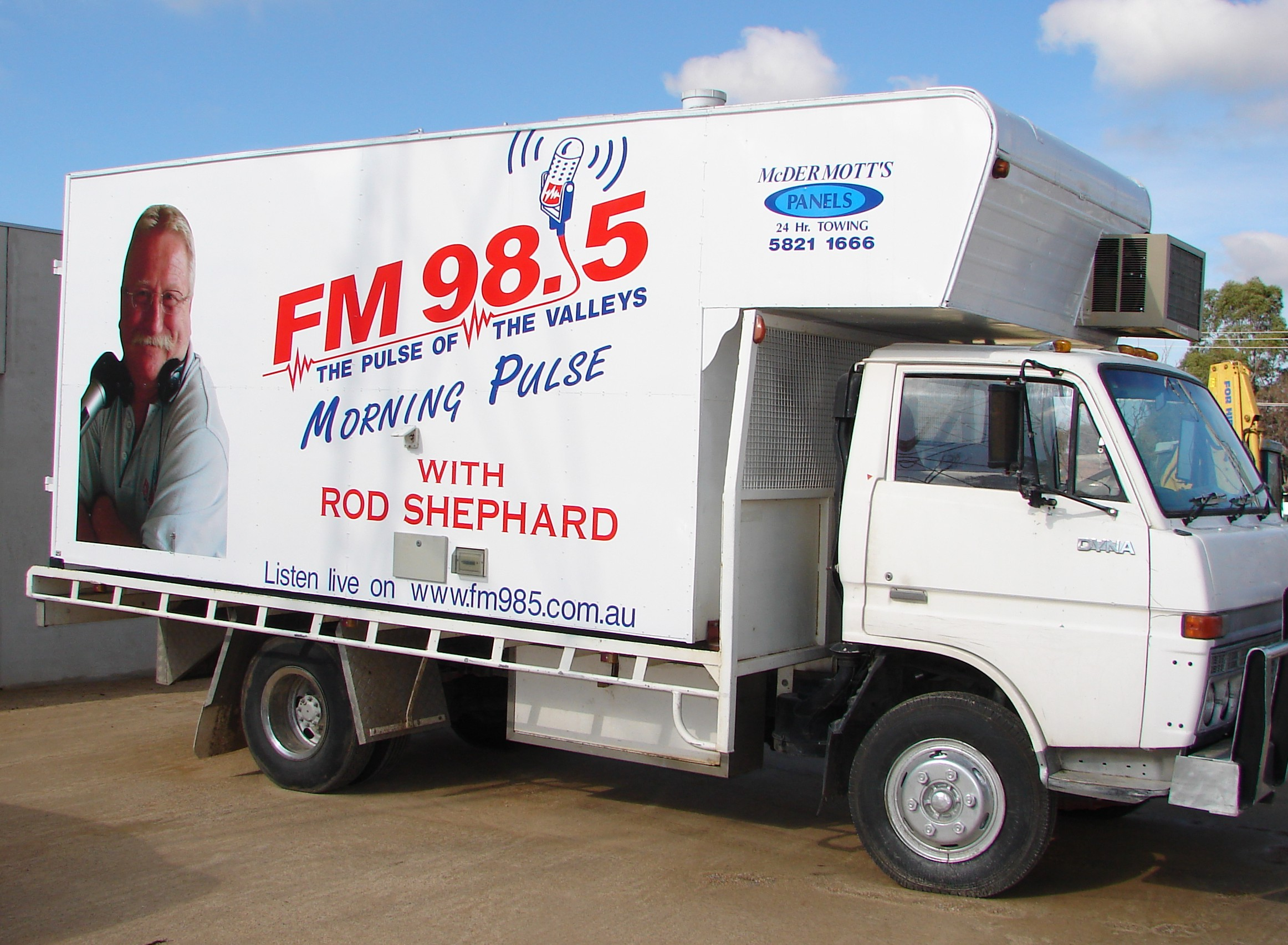
ONE FM 98.5 Outside Broadcast Truck
