= KZID =

- Culdesac, Idaho; United States
- Broadcast area: Lewiston, Idaho
- Frequency: 98.5 MHz
- Branding: 98.5 KHITS-FM

Programming
- Format: Classic hits

Ownership
- Owner: James and Darcy Nelly; (Nelly Broadcasting LLC)

History
- First air date: 2010

Technical information
- Licensing authority: FCC
- Facility ID: 88203
- Class: C3
- ERP: 16,000 watts
- HAAT: 128 meters (420 ft)
- Transmitter coordinates: 46°28′9″N 116°16′40″W

Links
- Public license information: Public file; LMS
- Webcast: Listen Live
- Website: 985khitsfm.com

KZID (98.5 FM) is a radio station. It is licensed to Culdesac, Idaho. The station serves the Lewiston-Clarkston and Moscow-Pullman areas. The station is currently owned by James and Darcy Nelly, through licensee Nelly Broadcasting LLC.

Branded as KHITS-FM, the station serves the Lewiston, Clarkston, Asotin, Orofino, Moscow-Pullman and surrounding areas and plays hits from the 1970s, 1980s and 1990s. It is the home of Clarkston Bantam Sports Radio Network and covers Clarkston High School Football and Boys and Girls Basketball. KHITS-FM focuses on local events marketing and community involvement.
