= Kalibo =

Capital of Aklan, Philippines

- Municipality
- Municipality of Kalibo
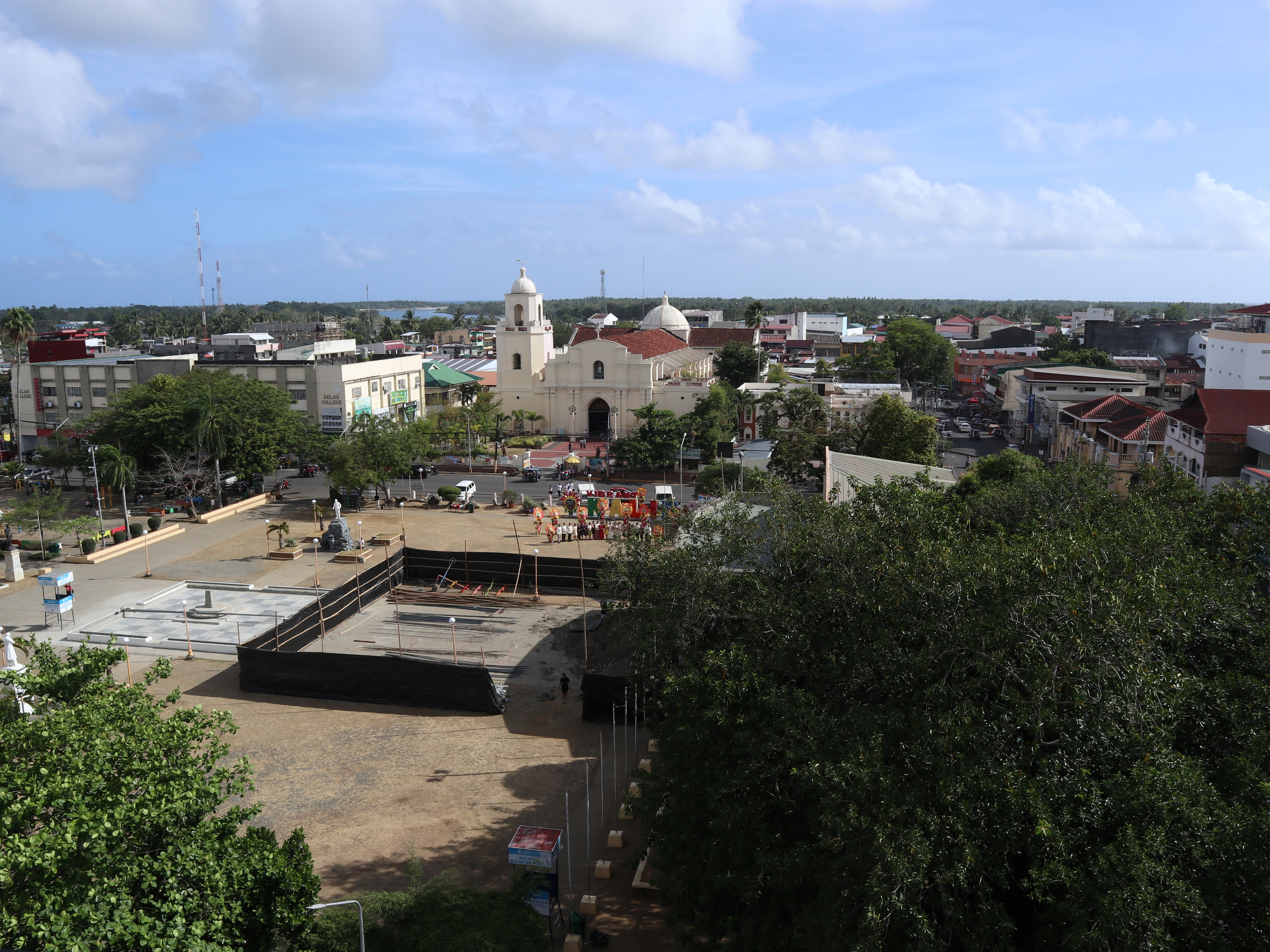
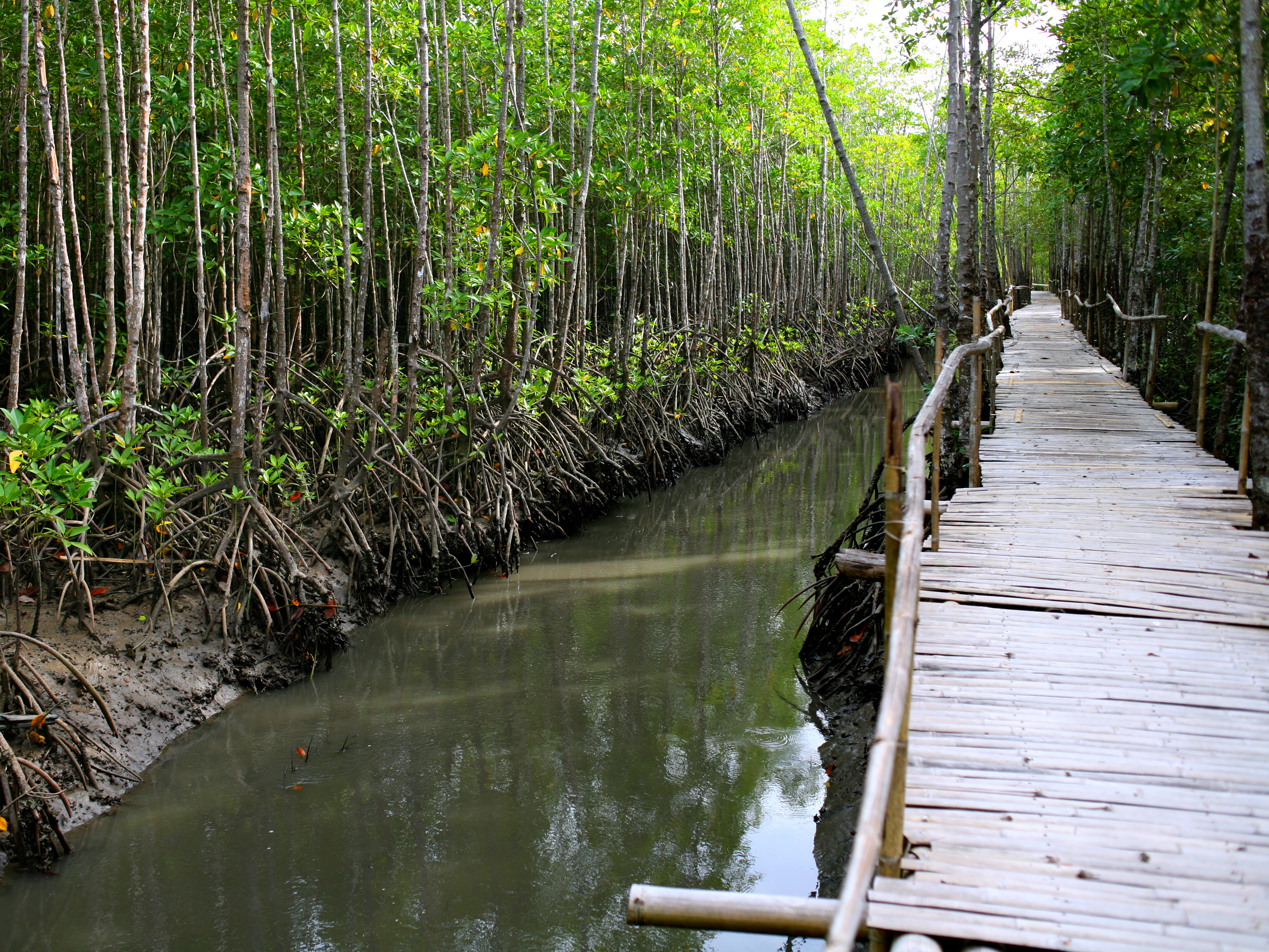
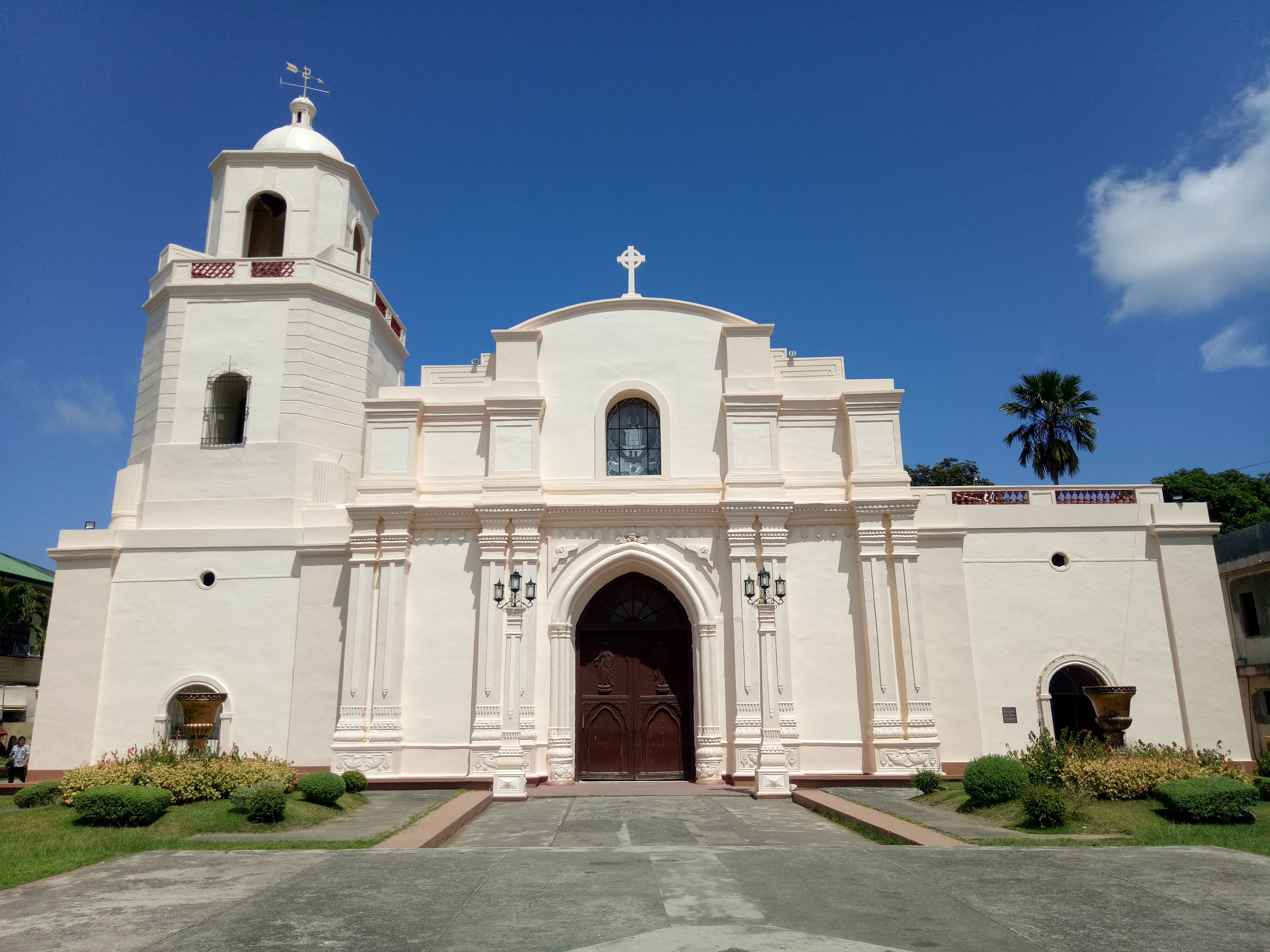
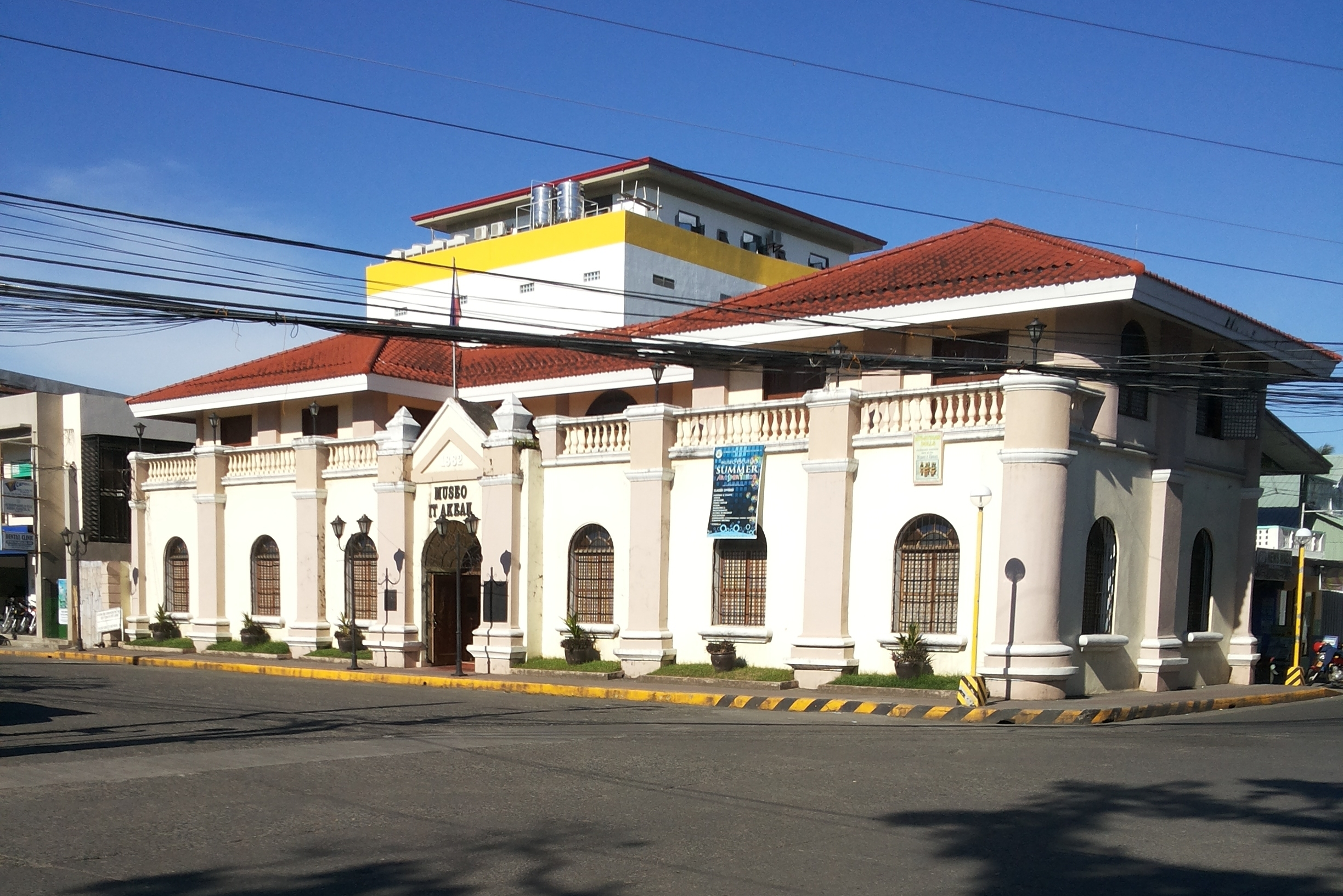
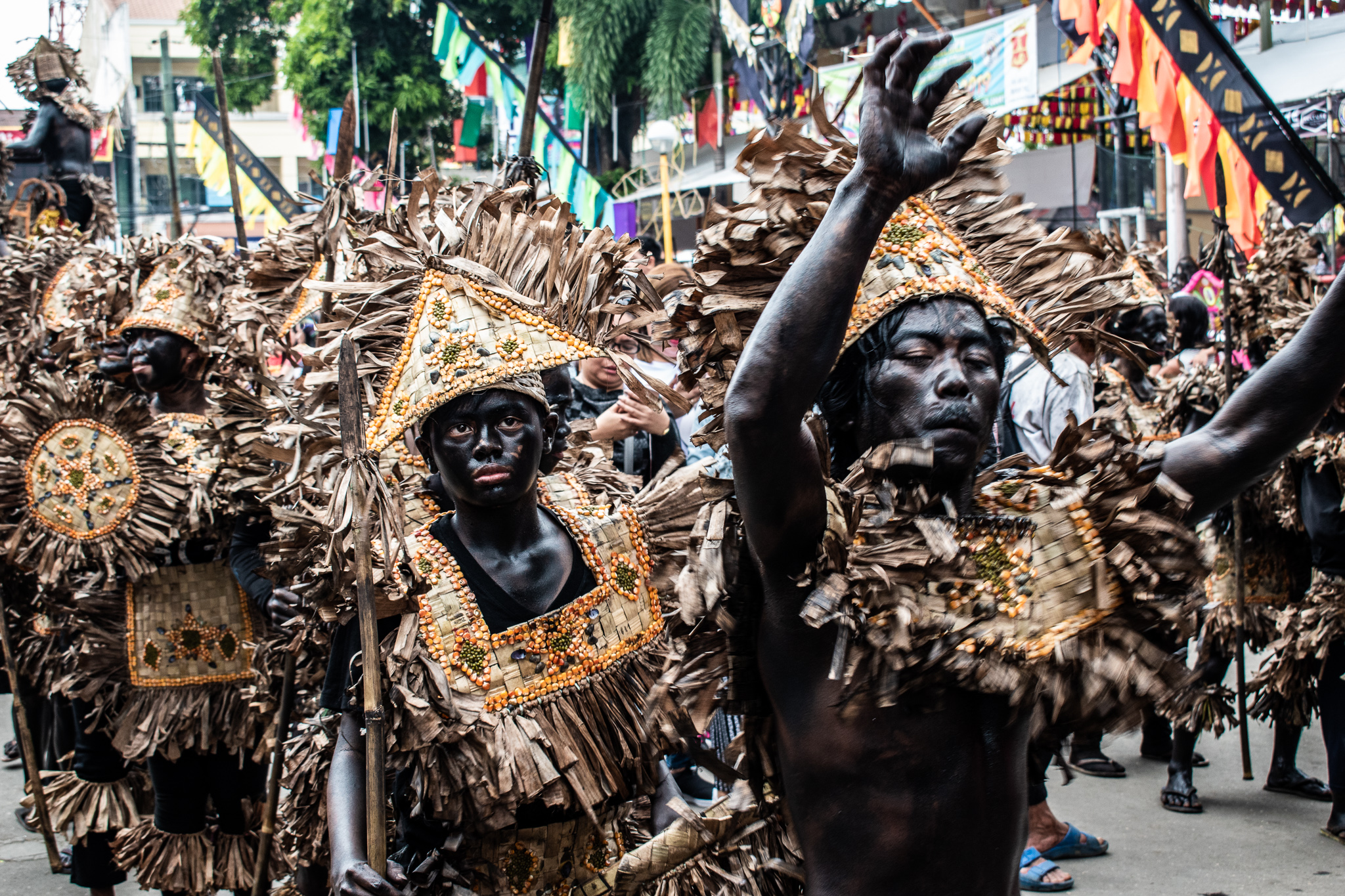
- From top, left to right: Pastrana Park, Bakhawan Eco-Park, Kalibo Cathedral, Museo It Akean, and Ati-Atihan Festival

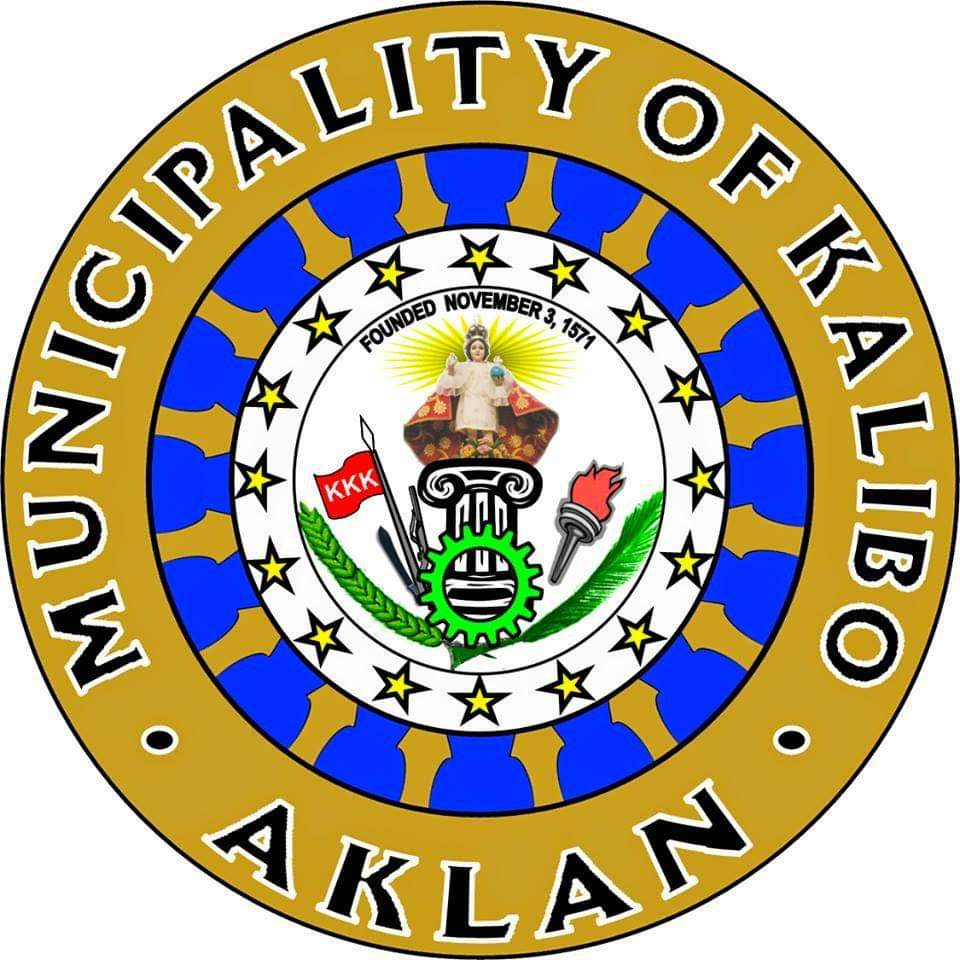
- Flag Seal
- Etymology: Calivo
- Nickname: Ati-Atihan Town
- Motto: Gateway to the Paradise Island of Boracay
- Anthem: Kalibo Hymn
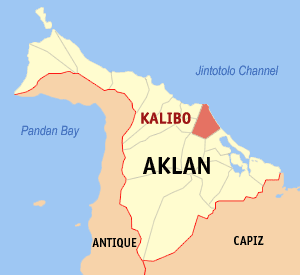
- Map of Aklan with Kalibo highlighted
- Interactive map of Kalibo
- Location within the Philippines
- Coordinates: 11°42′26″N 122°22′12″E
- Country: Philippines
- Region: Western Visayas
- Province: Aklan
- District: 1st district
- Founded: November 3, 1571
- Barangays: 16 (see Barangays)

Government
  - Type: Sangguniang Bayan
  - Mayor: Juris B. Sucro
  - Vice Mayor: Phillip Y. Kimpo, Jr.
  - Representative: Jess Marquez
  - Municipal Council: Members: Ketchie F. Luces; Matt Aaron P. Guzman; Raymar A. Rebaldo; Atty. Christine C. Dela Cruz; William Lachica, Jr.; Engr. Emerson S. Lachica; Engr. Rex A. Bautista; Ronald L. Marte
  - Electorate: 53,191 voters (2025)

Area
  - Total: 50.75 km^{2} (19.59 sq mi)
- Elevation: 7.0 m (23.0 ft)
- Highest elevation: 54 m (177 ft)
- Lowest elevation: −1 m (−3.3 ft)

Population (2024 census)
  - Total: 93,218
  - Density: 1,837/km^{2} (4,757/sq mi)
  - Households: 20,993
- Demonym: Kalibonhon

Economy
  - Income class: 1st municipal income class
  - Poverty incidence: 2.35% (2023)
  - Revenue: ₱ 571.5 million (2024)
  - Assets: ₱ 2,301 million (2024)
  - Expenditure: ₱ 625.6 million (2024)
  - Liabilities: ₱ 1,503 million (2024)

Service provider
  - Electricity: Aklan Electric Cooperative (AKELCO)
  - Water: Metro Kalibo Water District (MKWD)
- Time zone: UTC+8 (PST)
- ZIP code: 5600
- PSGC: 060407000
- IDD : area code: +63 (0)36
- Native languages: Aklanon; Hiligaynon; Capisnon; Tagalog
- Website: kaliboaklan.gov.ph

Kalibo, officially the Municipality of Kalibo (Aklanon: Banwa it Kalibo; Hiligaynon: Banwa sang Kalibo; Tagalog: Bayan ng Kalibo), is a municipality and capital of the Province of Aklan, Philippines. According to the 2024 census, it has a population of 93,218 people. It is the most populous town in the province.

The municipality is known for the Ati-Atihan Festival, the semi-urban and multi-awarded mangrove forest Bakhawan Eco-Park, and the piña-weaving, which was inscribed to the UNESCO Intangible Cultural Heritage List in 2023.

== Etymology ==
The term Kalibo comes from the Aklanon word sangkâ líbo, ("one thousand"), reputedly the number of native Ati who attended the first Catholic Mass celebrated there. Kalibo was originally spelled as Calivo.

The town of Kalibo was originally called Akean by the inhabitants, similar to the name of the river nearby. The word akean itself connotes the warbling of running waters, from the root word akae, meaning "to boil". Akae-akae means "to bubble" or "to boil" or "to make the sound of bubbling or boiling" in the Aklanon language.

The Spaniards interchanged the names Aklan and Calivo to refer to the town. Aside from these two, other names such as Calibo, Daclan, Adan, and Calibog have been used.

== History ==
=== Precolonial and Spanish Colonial Period ===
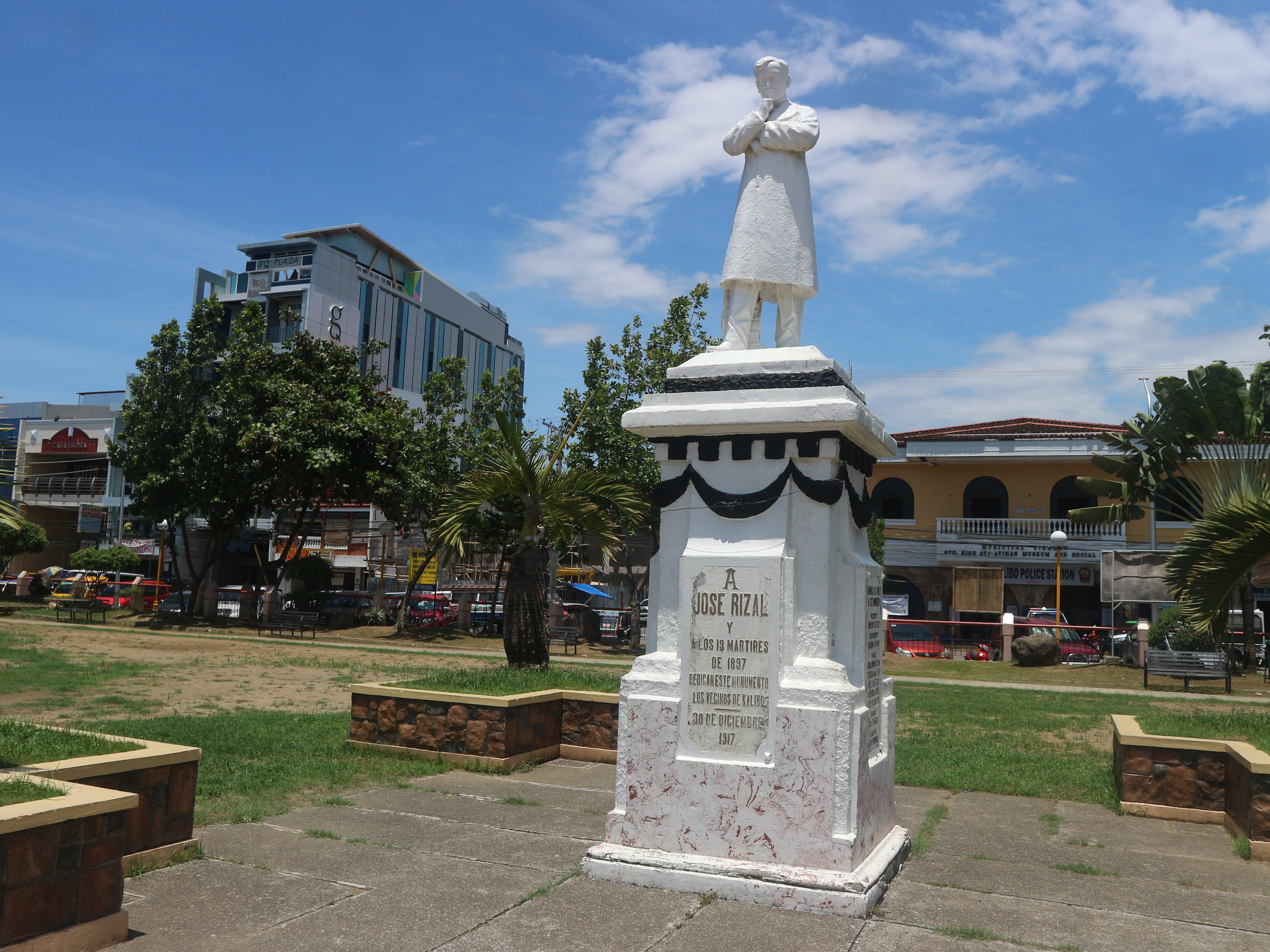
Monument of Jose Rizal

When Miguel López de Legazpi arrived in 1569, he discovered that the town already had around 2,000 inhabitants, so he recruited 500 of them to help conquer the rest of the Philippines. On November 3, 1571, it became an encomienda and on April 22, 1581, the town became a parish under the Augustinians. During the Spanish era, Kalibo was part of Capiz. The 1818 Spanish census showed that there were 2,700 native families and 167 Spanish-Filipino families flourishing here.

On March 17, 1897, Filipino revolutionaries march to Kalibo but lost the battle against the Spaniards. Some of them escaped to the jungle.

On March 23, 1897, the Nineteen Martyrs of Aklan were executed by the Spanish colonial government for their role in the Philippine Revolution.

=== Commonwealth, World War II and Post-war Period ===
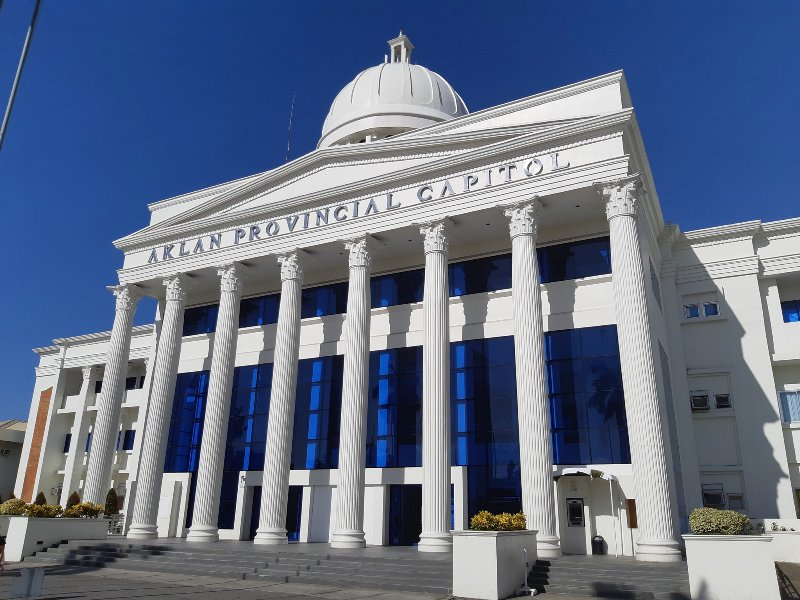
Aklan Provincial Capitol

Aklan continued to be part of Capiz during the early 20th century. When the Americans came, they annexed financially-struggling towns with bigger towns in the whole country, reducing the number of municipalities in Capiz from 34 to 24. In 1903, today's towns of Lezo, Numancia, and Banga were annexed to Kalibo. Lezo and Numancia (which were a single municipality then) de-merged in 1909 and Banga followed suit in 1912.

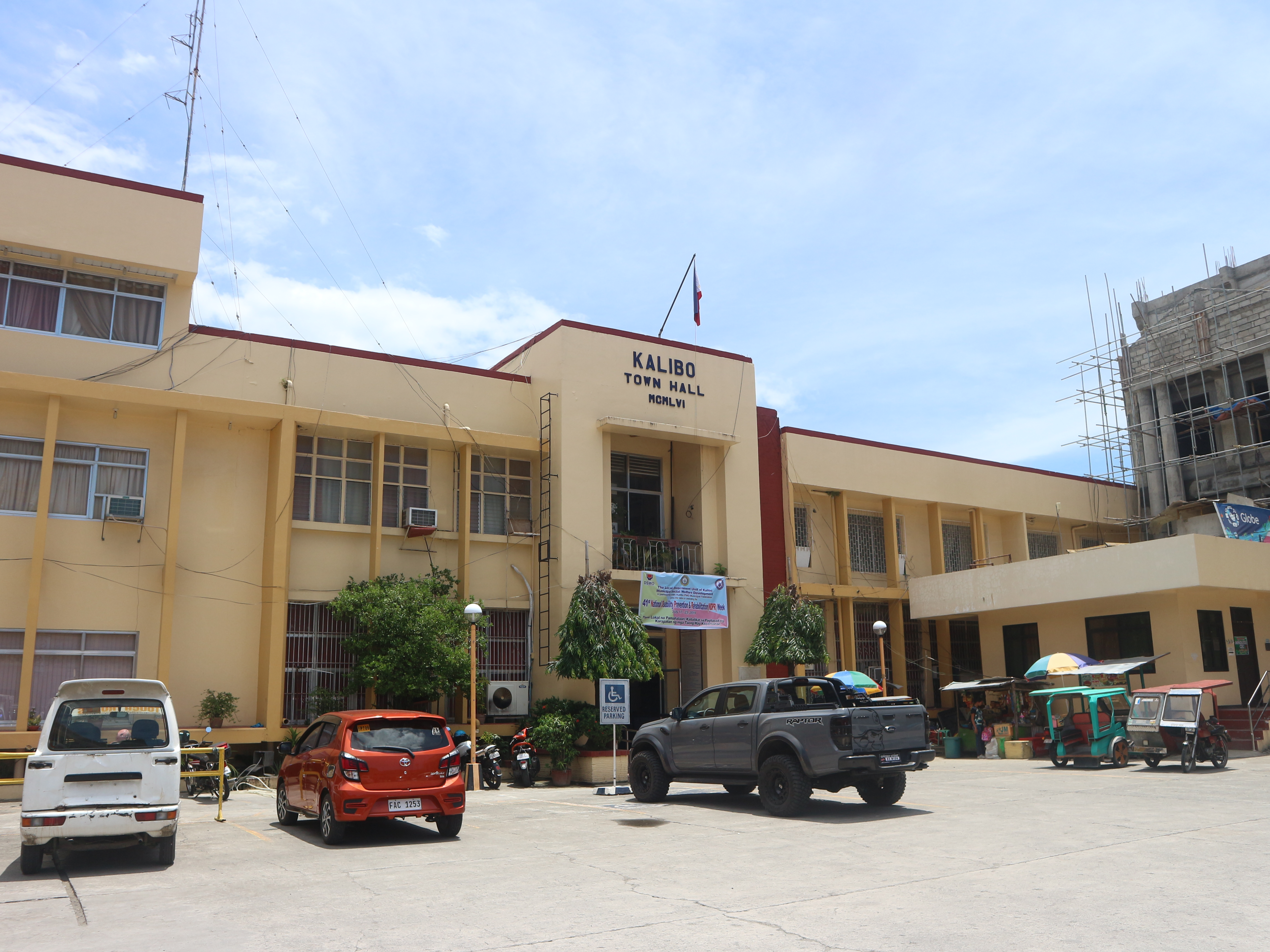
Kalibo Town Hall

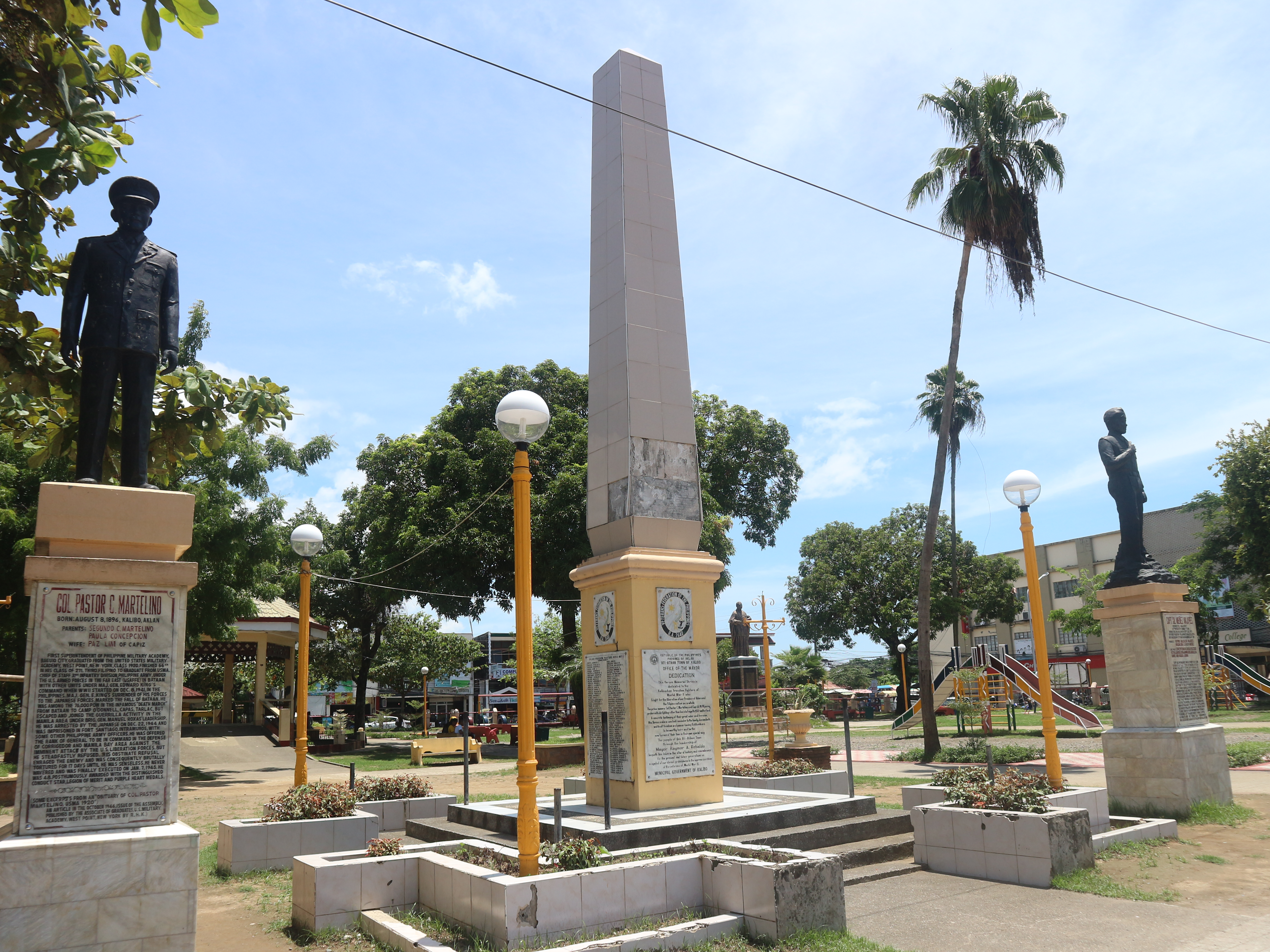
Kalibo Plaza (Pastrana Park)

In 1929, the Capiz Provincial Hospital was built in Kalibo. Equipped with 30 beds, it was one of the few provincial capitals located outside provincial capitals. It opened in 1930. However, the war forced it to close, only reopening in 1945. In 1981, the hospital would later be renamed Dr. Rafael S. Tumbukon Memorial Hospital (DRSTMH), in honor of Dr. Rafael Tumbokon, a former representative of the 3rd district of Capiz (1932 to 1938) and Undersecretary of Health in the 1950s.

The town also suffered from World War II. Kalibo itself was occupied by the Japanese from May to August 1942, and then the invaders moved on to Capiz. They returned to town 15 months later, following the October 1943 juez de cuchillo where the Japanese massacred 74 Batan residents. This time, they garrisoned the towns of Kalibo, Ibajay, New Washington, Altavas, Balete, and Batan. The town would eventually be liberated together with the entire island of Panay on March 18, 1945.

The town's older private colleges were established after the war: Aklan Catholic College (1945), and Northwestern Visayan Colleges (1948).

On November 8, 1956, the province of Aklan was officially established, and Kalibo became its capital.

The town's trade school, the Roxas Memorial School of Arts and Trades (RMSAT), was established in 1959 and opened in 1960.

=== Martial Law Period (1965-1986) ===
The mid-60s to mid-80s saw several developments rise in Kalibo as it took on its role as Aklan's capital town. The Garcia College of Technology, a private technical college, opened in 1968. St Gabriel Medical Center, a major private hospital, opened its doors in 1969. The local power company, Aklan Electric Cooperative, was established in 1972. Meanwhile, the local water district, the Metro Kalibo Water District, was created in 1976. The provincial diocese was also erected in 1976.

RMSAT was elevated to a state college in 1983.

In 1984, Typhoon Agnes (local name Undang), ravaged Kalibo and the whole province. It would become the worst typhoon disaster Kalibo will experience until Typhoon Fengshen (local name Frank) in 2008.

=== Contemporary Period (1986-present) ===
As a response to Undang, the Bakhawan Eco-Park began to take shape in December 1989 when the Kalibo Save the Mangroves movement was organized.

RMCAT became part of Aklan State College of Agriculture in 1998. It was elevated into a university in 2001.

In 1990, the town recorded 50,000 residents for the first time. Kalibo was classified a first-class municipality in 1997, and again in 2008. The town's first major mall, Gaisano Capital Kalibo, opened in 2002. It is located in Roxas Avenue Extension, and had 20,000 sqm of retail space.

== Geography ==
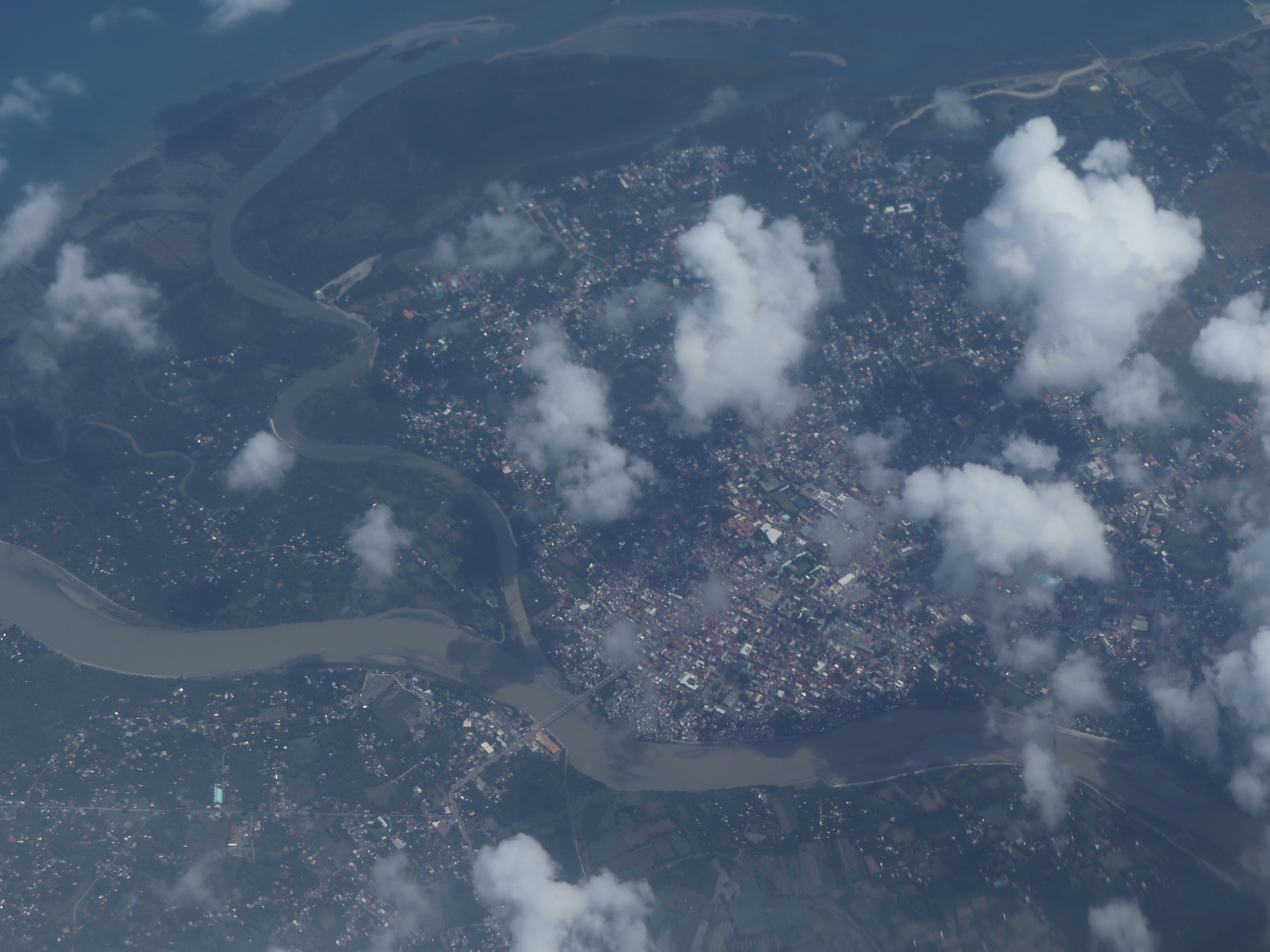
Aerial view of Kalibo

Kalibo is located at 11°42′26″N 122°22′12″E in the north-west of Panay island.

According to the Philippine Statistics Authority, the municipality has a land area of 50.75 square kilometres (19.59 sq mi) constituting 2.79% of the 1,821.42-square-kilometre- (703.25 sq mi) total area of Aklan.

=== Topography ===
Kalibo is situated on the alluvial plains of the Aklan River which lies to its west. The town is generally flat, with slopes ranging from 0 to 3%.

=== Climate ===
Climate data for Kalibo, Aklan
Month	Jan	Feb	Mar	Apr	May	Jun	Jul	Aug	Sep	Oct	Nov	Dec	Year
Mean daily maximum °C (°F)	28 (82)	29 (84)	30 (86)	32 (90)	32 (90)	31 (88)	31 (88)	30 (86)	30 (86)	29 (84)	29 (84)	28 (82)	30 (86)
Mean daily minimum °C (°F)	23 (73)	23 (73)	23 (73)	24 (75)	25 (77)	25 (77)	25 (77)	25 (77)	25 (77)	25 (77)	24 (75)	23 (73)	24 (75)
Average precipitation mm (inches)	47 (1.9)	33 (1.3)	39 (1.5)	48 (1.9)	98 (3.9)	150 (5.9)	169 (6.7)	147 (5.8)	163 (6.4)	172 (6.8)	118 (4.6)	80 (3.1)	1,264 (49.8)
Average rainy days	11.4	8.2	9.3	9.7	19.1	25.6	27.4	25.5	25.5	25.2	18.5	14.5	219.9
Source: Meteoblue

=== Barangays ===
Kalibo is politically subdivided into sixteen (16) barangays. Each barangay consists of puroks and some have sitios.

All barangays are classified as urban. Mobo was formerly known as Tinigao Bongoe.

PSGC	Barangay	Population			±% p.a.	
		2024		2010		
060407001	Andagao	13.6%	12,703	12,607	▴	0.05%
060407002	Bachaw Norte	2.5%	2,336	2,031	▴	0.97%
060407003	Bachaw Sur	3.4%	3,131	2,688	▴	1.06%
060407004	Briones	1.4%	1,321	1,246	▴	0.41%
060407005	Buswang New	11.2%	10,431	9,231	▴	0.85%
060407006	Buswang Old	3.5%	3,247	2,420	▴	2.06%
060407007	Caano	1.9%	1,803	1,488	▴	1.34%
060407008	Estancia	9.0%	8,372	8,672	▾	−0.24%
060407009	Linabuan Norte	4.4%	4,130	4,058	▴	0.12%
060407010	Mabilo	2.6%	2,378	2,298	▴	0.24%
060407011	Mobo	1.7%	1,543	1,939	▾	−1.57%
060407012	Nalook	3.6%	3,323	2,879	▴	1.00%
060407013	Poblacion	12.6%	11,751	11,018	▴	0.45%
060407014	Pook	6.2%	5,744	5,010	▴	0.95%
060407015	Tigayon	6.1%	5,640	4,648	▴	1.35%
060407016	Tinigaw	3.0%	2,752	2,386	▴	0.99%
	Total		93,218	74,619	▴	1.55%

== Demographics ==
Population census of Kalibo
Year	Pop.	±% p.a.
1903	14,574	—
1918	13,926	−0.30%
1939	16,095	+0.69%
1948	17,842	+1.15%
1960	21,303	+1.49%
1970	30,247	+3.56%
1975	31,947	+1.10%
1980	39,894	+4.54%
1990	51,387	+2.56%
1995	58,065	+2.32%
2000	62,438	+1.57%
2007	69,700	+1.53%
2010	74,619	+2.51%
2015	80,605	+1.48%
2020	89,127	+2.14%
2024	93,218	+1.08%
Source: Philippine Statistics Authority

In the 2024 census, Kalibo had a population of 93,218. The population density was 1,800 inhabitants per square kilometre (4,700/sq mi).

=== Language ===
Aklanon is the main dialect of Kalibo and the entire province of Aklan. Hiligaynon is also spoken as the secondary language of the municipality.

== Economy ==
Poverty incidence of Kalibo (%)

Source: Philippine Statistics Authority

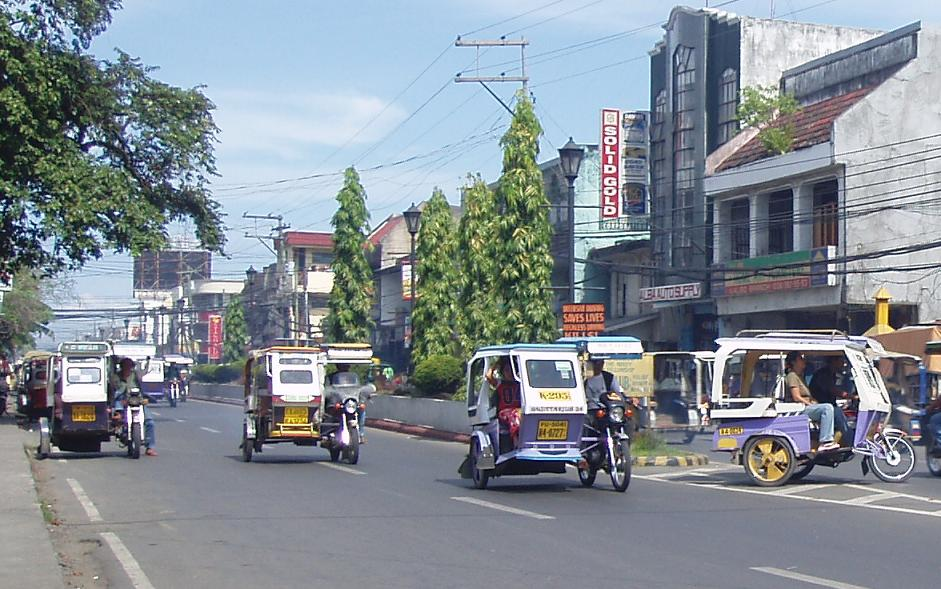
Roxas Avenue, the main commercial thoroughfare of the town

Kalibo's main industry is agriculture, based on rice, coconuts, piña and abaca. The town also produces piña fiber, which is marketed as an alternative to traditional leather. Kalibo also has food manufacturing facilities, supporting a meat-processing industry that produces chorizo, tocino and other similar products.

Kalibo serves as the commercial center for Aklan province, owing to its status as the provincial capital. Its institutions serve its immediate surrounding area. In 2021, the municipality hosted 28 banks and held 19 million pesos in total deposits, the largest among 17 municipalities of Aklan. This is equivalent to 75% of all deposits in the province. The Kalibo Public Market, Gaisano Grand, Gaisano Capital, CityMall and SM Cherry further cement Kalibo's position as a retail hub.

The town also hosts multiple higher educational institutions such as Aklan Catholic College, Northwestern Visayan Colleges and Garcia College of Technology. The College of Industrial Technology of Aklan State University is located in Andagao.

Some hospitals in the town include the government-owned Dr. Rafael S. Tumbokon Memorial Hospital; the private St Gabriel Hospital, Panay Healthcare Medical Center and Asia Pacific Medical Center.

Tourism in Kalibo peaks during the Ati-Atihan Festival, celebrated every second week of January and culminating on the third Sunday. The town also benefits from good road connections to Boracay, allowing it to become a jump-off point for tourists headed to the island. This is all underpinned by the presence of the Kalibo International Airport which was the fourth busiest airport in the country as of 2022.

== Culture ==
=== Ati-Atihan Festival ===
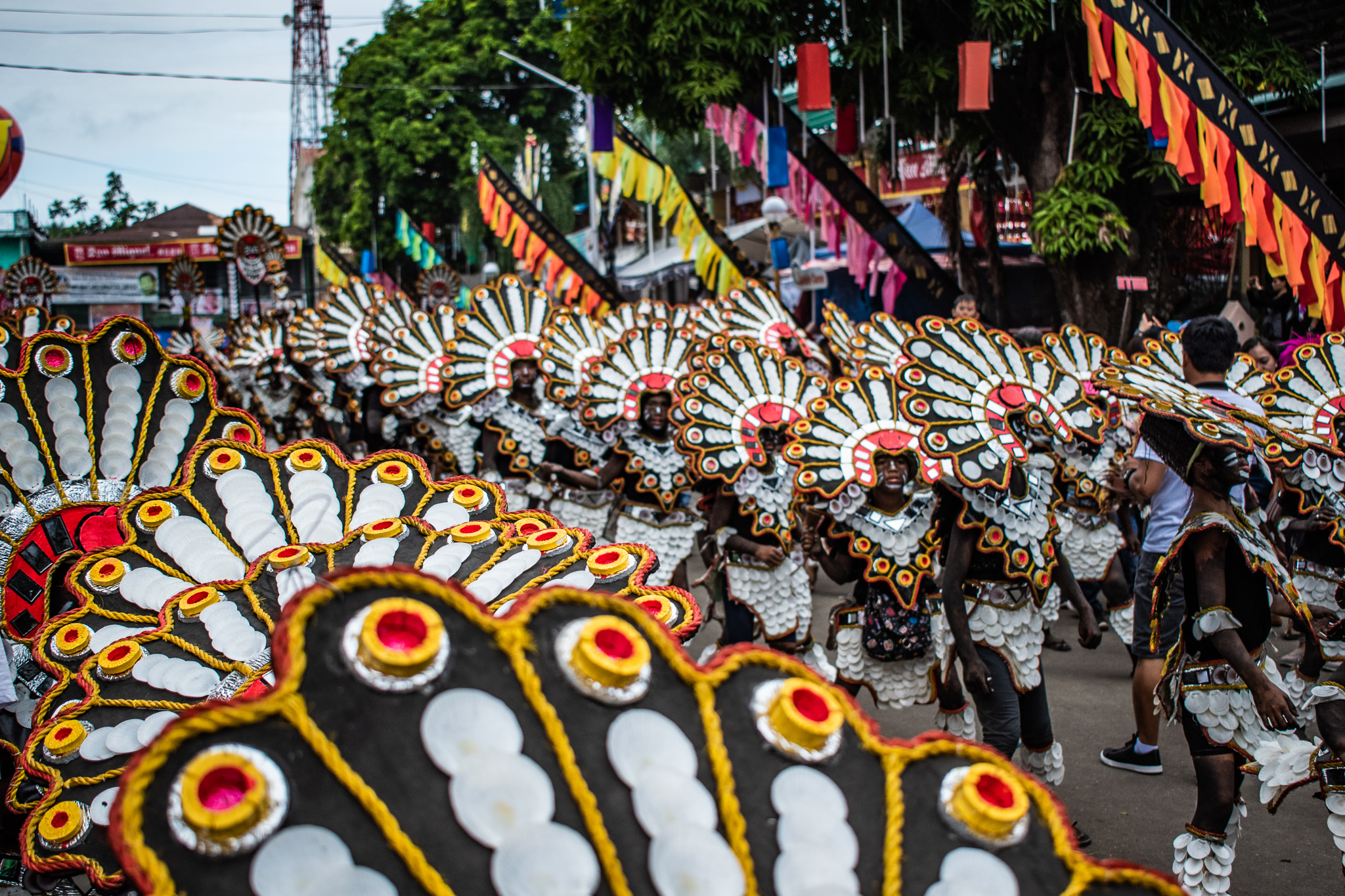
Ati-Atihan street dance 2019

The Ati-Atihan Festival is a festival celebrated in Kalibo every second week of January and culminating on the third Sunday of the month. Revelers smear themselves with soot or any blackening substance in order to look like an Ati.

The Ati-Atihan Festival is believed to have started in the year 1212 when Borneans, led by the ten datus, traveled on balangays and crossed the Sulu Sea to land in Panay, making it the oldest festival in the Philippines.

Ati-atihan Festival was included as one of the "World's Best Festivals" by Fest300, dubbed as the "Grand Daddy of Philippine Festivals" by the Largest Travel Guide Book Publisher in the World - Lonely Planet and recognized, as well as, holds the title of "Mother of All Philippine Festivals".

=== Attractions ===
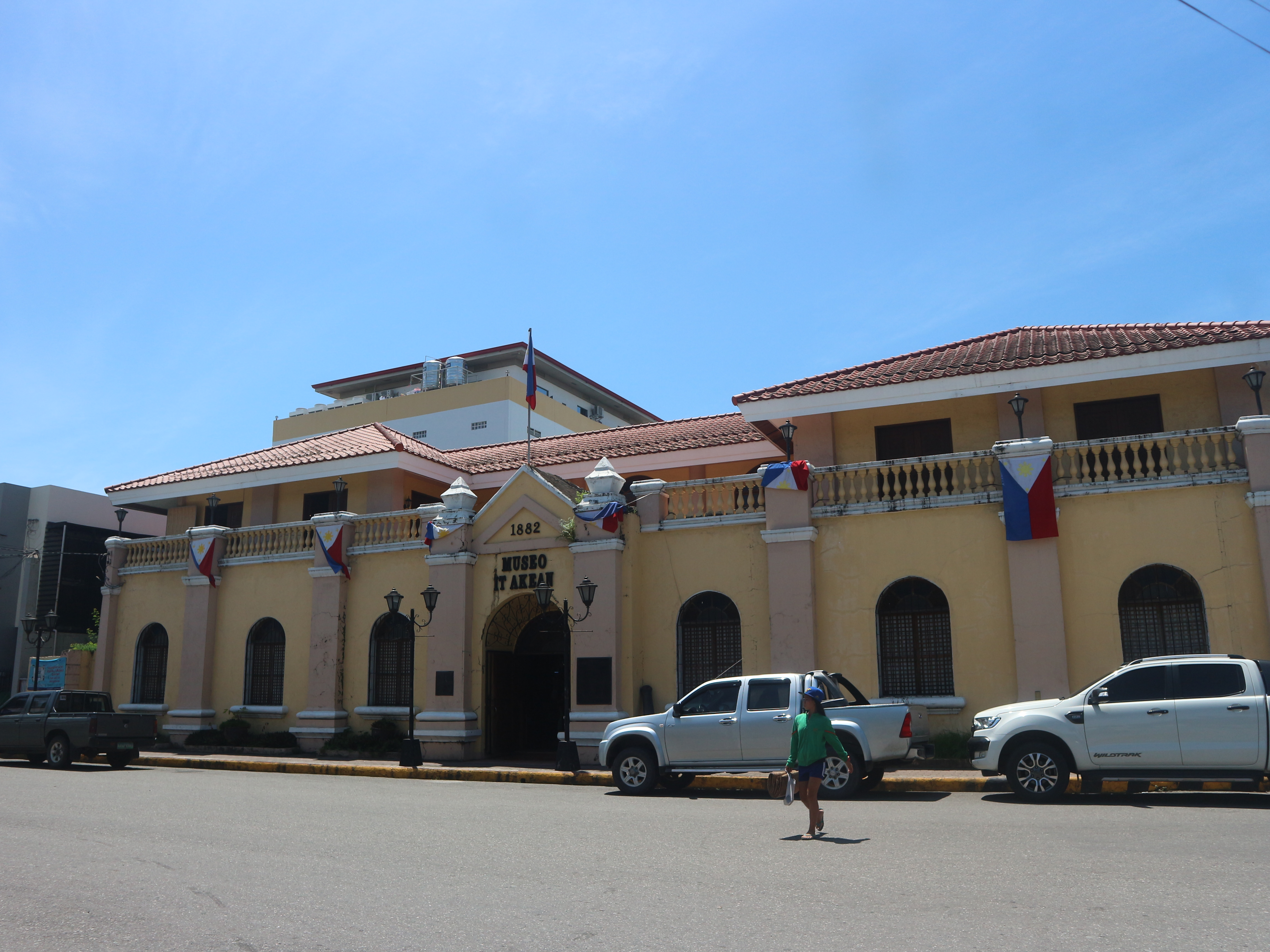
Kalibo Museum (Museo It Akean)

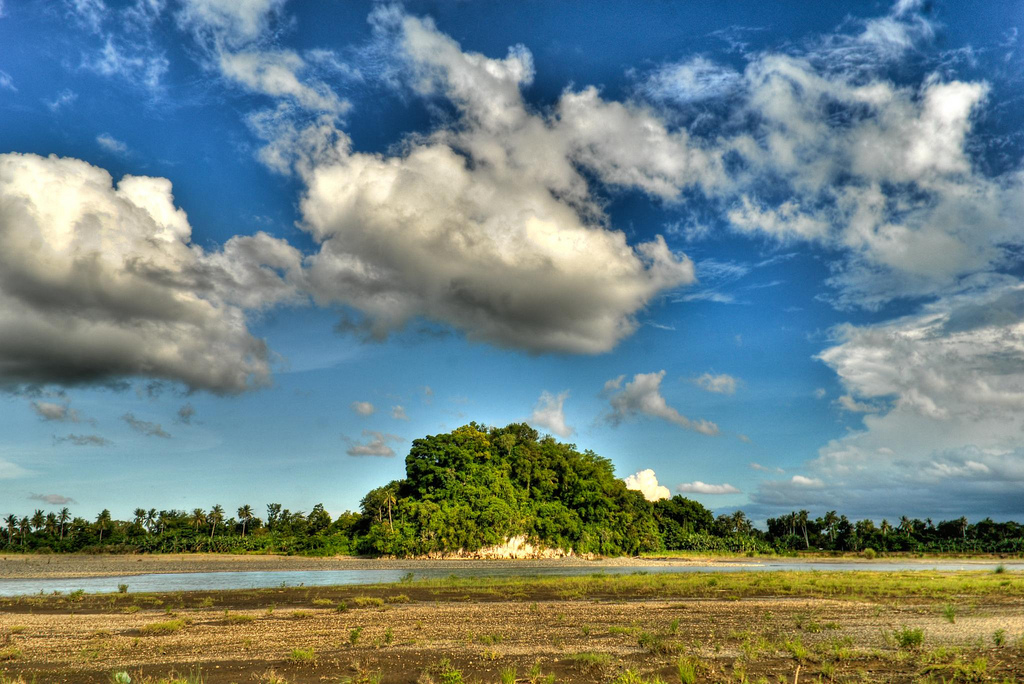
Tigayon Hills

Landmarks of the town include Aklan River, the main river that flows through the town and the origin of the name of the province. Within the town proper lies Freedom Shrine which commemorates World War II veterans and the Museo it Akean, a museum of Aklan's history. Outside the town lies Bakhawan Eco-Park, a 220-hectare (540-acre) mangrove reforestation project that began in 1990 in barangay New Buswang. Tigayon Hill and Caves in Barangay Tigayon which were burial sites during the pre-Hispanic era and a pit for Chinese artifacts which were excavated in the recent past.

=== Historical Markers ===
The table below is the list of Historical Markers installed by the National Historical Commission of the Philippines in Kalibo.

Marker Title	Description	Date Issued	Location
Death site of Gen. Francisco del Castillo	Patriot Defender of Liberty and Leader of the Aklan Revolutionists	1952 (Original) 2019 (Re-created)	Pastrana Park (Poblacion)
Nineteen Martyrs of Aklan	Filipino Patriots in Kalibo, Aklan	1952	Acevedo Building (Poblacion)
Victorino Montano Mapa	Supreme Court Chief 1920 - 1921	1964	Glowmoon Hotel (Poblacion)
Birthplace of Most Reverend Gabriel Martelino Reyes, D.D	28th Archbishop of Manila, and the first native Filipino to hold that post		CAP Building (Poblacion)
Kap. Gil M. Mijares	One of the Aklanon Heroes of World War II	2006	Kalibo Police Station Building (Poblacion)
Koronel Pastor C. Martelino	One of the Aklanon Heroes of World War II	2006	Camp Pastor Martelino (New Buswang)
Macario L. Peralta, Jr.	Filipino Commander during World War II	2013	Provincial Capitol Site (Estancia)
Aklan Freedom Shrine	A National Shrine	2019	D. Maagma cor Veterans’ Avenue (Poblacion)
Memorare - 19 Martyrs of Aklan	Tableau memorial in honor of the freedom heroes	2019	Goding Ramos Park, Capitol Grounds (Estancia)

== Infrastructure ==
Kalibo's roads are composed of national, municipal and barangay roads. The town is connected to Iloilo City and Roxas City via the Aklan East Coast Road. In 2023, the new Kalibo Circumferential Road was declared as a national-level road. The road features a new bridge (Kalibo Bridge III) across the Aklan River and connects municipalities west of it to Brgy. Tigayon, the airport, and the jetty port in Brgy. Pook.

Water is provided by the Metro Kalibo Water District while power is provided by the Aklan Electric Cooperative.

== Transportation ==
Kalibo is the main transportation hub for the resort island of Boracay.

=== Air ===
Air travel to Kalibo from Manila is about 45 minutes under two airlines: Cebu Pacific and Philippines AirAsia. These airlines increase their flights during the Kalibo Ati-Atihan Festival every January each year. T'way Air does flights to Incheon, South Korea while IrAero has flights to Irkutsk and Khabarovsk in Russia. (Note: IrAero flights make an intermediate stop in Guilin en route to the listed destination. However, the airline has no fifth freedom rights to carry passengers solely between Kalibo and Guilin.)

Kalibo is the major hub for/to Boracay. The Kalibo International Airport is about ten minutes away from Poblacion Kalibo main plaza (Pastrana Park).

=== Sea ===
Kalibo has four ports near the town. The New Washington port and the Dumaguit port are 20 minutes away from Kalibo. Batan port is accessible via Dumaguit and Altavas while the Malay port is approximately two hours. Travel time from Manila to Aklan is 14 to 18 hours through sea travel.

The Caticlan Jetty Port is part of the Roll-on Roll-off (RORO) Strong Republic Nautical Highway that connects Luzon, Visayas and Mindanao, and it passes through Kalibo to Capiz or Romblon. There is a jetty port in barangay Pook of Kalibo.

=== Land ===
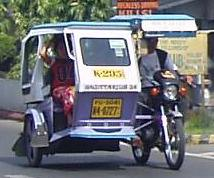
Tricycle with 8-passenger sidecar.

Public transportation around the town is by tricycle, taxi, multicab and jeepneys.

Kalibo is 158 kilometres (98 mi) from Iloilo City, 86 kilometres (53 mi) from Roxas City, and 182 kilometres (113 mi) from San Jose, Antique. Land travel from Iloilo City to Kalibo takes approximately three hours, one and a half hours from Roxas City, and four hours from San Jose, Antique. All are accessible by bus and minivans. Trips to Caticlan range from 70 minutes to 90 minutes depending on the mode of transportation.

=== Public transport ===
The tricycle dominates the streets in Kalibo and is the main form of public transport. The town has its own version of the design of its tricycle that can accommodate up to 8 passengers. The design was also adopted in the rest of Aklan and some parts of northern Antique and western parts of Capiz. There are about 3,000 tricycles-for-hire that are registered with Sangguniang Bayan-issued franchises operating within the 16 barangays of the Municipality of Kalibo and are distributed in accordance with their following approved routes or zones of operation:

Route No.	Color code		Coverage	Terminal
1	Green		Osmena Avenue; Estancia; Tinigao; Mobo; Tigayon; Linabuan Norte	Kalibo Public Market
2	Blue		New Buswang; Old Buswang; Bakhaw Sur; Bakhaw Norte; Bakawan Eco-Park	RC Supermart; Gaisano (to Andagao)
3	Orange		Cardinal Sin Avenue; Andagao; Caano; Pook; Kalibo International Airport; Nalook; Mabilo (Kalibo); Briones	Allen's Mart / Our Own Little Ways Bakeshop (for Andagao Drivers).
4	White &	Purple	Poblacion Kalibo; Capitol Site; BLISS Site; ASU; Roxas Ave. Extension	None
Note: All the terminals are along Toting Reyes Street (except those bound for Andagao). The Municipality currently has plans of issuing Night-Tricycle franchises for evening public commuters

== Education ==
There are two schools district offices which govern all educational institutions within the municipality. They oversee the management and operations of all private and public, from primary to secondary schools. These are the:

- Kalibo I Schools District
- Kalibo II Schools District

=== Primary and elementary schools ===
- Aklan Academy
- Aklan Inter Faith Academy
- Aklan Learning Center
- Andagaw Elementary School
- Briones Elementary School
- Caano Elementary School
- Christ the King (Main)
- Dela Cruz Institute of Business & Industry
- Estancia Elementary School
- Gen. F. Castillo Memorial School
- Holy Child Nursery and Kindergarten School
- Infant Jesus Academy
- Infant Jesus School
- Kalibo Aklan Sun Yat Sen School
- Kalibo I Elementary School
- Kalibo Pilot Elementary School
- Linabuan Norte Elementary School
- Maranatha Christian Academy
- Marian High Kalibo Foundation
- Mobo Elementary School
- Nalook Elementary School
- New Buswang Elementary School
- Old Buswang-Bakhaw Sur Elementary School
- Pook Elementary School
- St. Anne Montessori School
- St. Dominic School
- St. Gabriel English School
- Starglow Center for Academics and Arts
- Tigayon Elementary School
- Tinigaw Elementary School
- Wadeford School

=== Secondary schools ===
Educational institutions which offer junior and senior high schools are the following:

- Aklan Catholic College
- Aklan Nationaol High School for Arts & Trades
- Aklan Valley High School Foundation
- Aklan Polytechnic College
- Bakhaw Norte Integrated School
- Central Panay College of Science & Technology
- Christ the King (Main)
- Garcia College of Technology
- Gaudencio L. Vega National High School (Nalook National High School)
- Joselito Alba Vocational & Technical School
- Kalibo Institute
- Kalibo Integrated Special Education Center
- Linabuan National High School
- Northwestern Visayan Colleges
- Regional Science High School
- Saint Gabriel College
- STI College
- Three Angels Adventist Learning Center
- Verde Grande College
- Western Pacific College

=== Higher educational institutions ===
- Aklan Catholic College
- Aklan Polytechnic College
- Central Panay College of Science & Technology
- Garcia College of Technology
- Northwestern Visayan Colleges
- Saint Gabriel College
- STI College
- Verde Grande College
- Western Pacific College

== Sister cities ==
Kalibo has one official sister city:

- Juneau, Alaska, United States (2014)
