= WINF-LP =

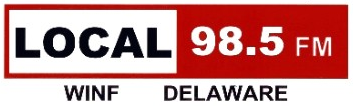
- Delaware, Ohio; United States
- Frequency: 98.5 MHz
- Branding: 98.5 WINF

Programming
- Format: Easy listening/Soft AC

Ownership
- Owner: Delaware County Development Company

History
- First air date: 2004 (at 101.9)
- Former frequencies: 101.9 MHz (2004–2014)

Technical information
- Licensing authority: FCC
- Facility ID: 132375
- Class: L1
- ERP: 67 watts
- HAAT: 37 meters (121 ft)
- Transmitter coordinates: 40°17′57″N 83°02′45″W

Links
- Public license information: LMS
- Webcast: Listen Live
- Website: 985winf.com

WINF-LP (98.5 FM) is a radio station licensed to Delaware, Ohio, airing both easy listening and soft adult contemporary music formats. The station is owned by Delaware County Development Company.
