= WNUW-LP =

- Aston, Pennsylvania; United States
- Frequency: 98.5 MHz
- Branding: 98.5 WNUW

Programming
- Language: English
- Format: Variety

Ownership
- Owner: Neumann University

History
- Former call signs: WRNU-LP (2014)

Technical information
- Licensing authority: FCC
- Facility ID: 192952
- Class: L1
- ERP: 18 watts
- HAAT: 64 metres (210 ft)
- Transmitter coordinates: 39°52′39″N 75°27′21″W

Links
- Public license information: LMS
- Webcast: Listen live (via TuneIn)
- Website: neumannmedia.org/wnuw/

WNUW-LP (98.5 FM) is a radio station licensed to serve the community of Aston, Pennsylvania. The station is owned by Neumann University. It airs a variety radio format.

The station was assigned the call sign WRNU-LP by the Federal Communications Commission on February 18, 2014. On June 24, 2014, the station changed its call sign to WNUW-LP
