= KOLS-LP =

- Oakhurst, California; United States
- Frequency: 98.5 MHz

Programming
- Format: Christian

Ownership
- Owner: Radio Catholic

History
- First air date: February 5, 2014

Technical information
- Licensing authority: FCC
- Facility ID: 192537
- Class: L1
- ERP: 100 watts
- HAAT: −41.2 meters (−135 ft)
- Transmitter coordinates: 37°23′45.40″N 119°37′05.10″W

Links
- Public license information: LMS
- Webcast: Listen live
- Website: radiocatholic.org

KOLS-LP (98.5 FM) is a low-power FM radio station broadcasting a Catholic radio format out of Oakhurst, California, United States.

== History ==
KOLS-LP began broadcasting on 5 February 2014.
