= 2018 in Mexican television =

The following is a list of events affecting Mexican television in 2018. Events listed include television show debuts, finales, and cancellations; channel launches, closures, and re-brandings; stations changing or adding their network affiliations; and information about controversies and carriage disputes.

== Events ==
- Most television stations in Mexico were required to change frequencies to repurpose the 600 MHz band for use by mobile services.
- September - Tecate, Baja California-licensed XHDTV-TDT in the Tijuana market, the final English-language television station in western Mexico, disaffiliates from the American-based MyNetworkTV programming service in favor of the Monterrey, Nuevo Leon-based Milenio Televisión network. MyNetworkTV was moved to The CW-affiliated KFMB-DT2 in San Diego as a secondary affiliation. This left CW affiliate XHRIO-TDT in Matamoros, Tamaulipas as the only English-language television station licensed in Mexico until that station ceased operation on December 31, 2021.

== Television shows ==
=== Debuts ===
- Casa de las Flores (2018–present)
- LOL: Last One Laughing (2018–2019)

=== Programs on-air ===
==== 1970s ====
- Plaza Sesamo (1972–present)

==== 1990s ====
- Acapulco Bay (1995–present)
- Corazon salvaje (1993–present)
- Esmeralda (1997–present)
- La usurpadora (1998–present)

==== 2000s ====
- Alma de hierro (2008–present)
- Big Brother México (2002–2005, 2015–present)
- Hotel Erotica Cabo (2006–present)
- Lo Que Callamos Las Mujeres (2001–present)

==== 2010s ====
- 40 y 20 (2016–present)
- Atrapada (2018–present)
- Casa de las Flores (2018–present)
- Como dice el dicho (2011–present)
- El Chiapo (2017–present)
- La Voz... México (2011–present)
- Por amar sin ley (2018–present)
- México Tiene Talento (2014–present)
- Rubirosa (2018–present)
- Sin tu mirads (2017–present)
- Valiant Love (2012–present)

== Television stations ==
=== Station launches ===
Date	Market	Station	Channel	Affiliation	Notes/References
12 February	Uruapan, Michoacán	XHJGMI-TDT	15 (UHF); 12 (PSIP)	Commercial independent	
2 May	Guadalajara, Jalisco	XHQMGU-TDT	9 (VHF); 10 (PSIP)	Commercial independent	
July	Chihuahua, Chihuahua	XHICCH-TDT	30 (UHF); 44 (PSIP)	Commercial independent	Satellite station of XHIJ-TDT/Ciudad Juárez
14 August	Mexico City	XHTDMX-TDT	11 (VHF); 6 (PSIP)	Multimedios Televisión	
October	Ciudad Juarez, Chihuahua	XHMTCH-TDT	28.1 (UHF)/6.1 (PSIP); 28.2 (UHF)/6.2 (PSIP); 28.3 (UHF)/6.3 (PSIP); 28.4 (UHF)/6.4 (PSIP)	Multimedios Televisión (primary); Milenio Television; Teleritmo; Independent (via XHABC-TDT)	
3 December	Puerto Vallarta, Jalisco	XHCPPV-TDT	27 (UHF); 10 (PSIP)	Commercial independent	
17 December	Saltillo, Coahuila	XHTSCO-TDT	36 (UHF); 10 (PSIP)	Independent	

=== Network affiliation changes ===
Date	Market	Station	Channel	Old Affiliation	New Affiliation	Notes/References
September	Tecate/Tijuana, Baja California (San Diego, California, United States)	XHDTV-TDT	49.1 (PSIP)	MyNetworkTV	Milenio Televisión	

=== Station closures ===
Date	Market	Station	Channel	Affiliation	Sign-on date	Notes/References
Unknown date	Ensenada, Baja California	XHENB-TDT	29 (UHF)	Pacific Spanish Network	1 October 1994	

== See also ==
- List of Mexican films of 2018
- 2018 in Mexico
