= List of television stations in Chihuahua =

The following is a list of all CRT-licensed over-the-air television stations broadcasting in the Mexican state of Chihuahua. There are 40 television stations in Chihuahua.

== List of television stations ==
RF	VC	Call sign	Location	Network/name	ERP	Concessionaire
36	2	XHCHC-TDT	Cd. Camargo	Las Estrellas	24 kW	Televimex
21	7/1	XHCGJ-TDT	Cd. Camargo	Azteca 7 (Azteca Uno)	17.09 kW	Televisión Azteca
17	14	XHCPAW-TDT	Cd. Camargo	Canal Catorce		Sistema Público de Radiodifusion del Estado Mexicano
36	2	XHCCH-TDT	Cd. Cuauhtémoc	Las Estrellas	26 kW	Televimex
20	11	XHCHU-TDT	Cd. Cuauhtémoc	Canal Once (Once Niñas y Niños)	22.09 kW	Instituto Politécnico Nacional
33	28	XHCTH-TDT	Cd. Cuauhtémoc	Canal 28	5.014 kW	Sistema Regional de Televisión
18	14	XHCPAV-TDT	Cd. Cuauhtémoc			Sistema Público de Radiodifusion del Estado Mexicano
33	2	XHDEH-TDT	Cd. Delicias	Las Estrellas	20 kW	Televimex
19	5	XHCDE-TDT	Cd. Delicias; Cd. Camargo	Canal 5	20 kW; 21 kW	Radio Televisión
20	11	XHCHD-TDT	Cd. Delicias	Canal Once (Once Niñas y Niños)	146.17 kW	Instituto Politécnico Nacional
24	1/7	XHJCH-TDT	Cd. Jiménez	Azteca Uno (Azteca 7)	1.3 kW	Televisión Azteca
33	2	XHBU-TDT	Cd. Jiménez	Las Estrellas	11 kW	Televimex
34	1	XHCJE-TDT	Cd. Juárez	Azteca Uno (adn40)	146.61 kW	Televisión Azteca
29	2	XEPM-TDT	Cd. Juárez	Las Estrellas (Estrellas El Paso)	200 kW	Televimex
31	3	XHCTCJ-TDT	Cd. Juárez	Imagen Televisión (Excélsior TV)	150 kW	Cadena Tres I, S.A. de C.V.
33	5/10	XHJUB-TDT	Cd. Juárez	Canal 5 (Nu9ve)	200 kW	Radio Televisión
28	6	XHMTCH-TDT	Cd. Juárez	Canal 6 (Milenio Televisión, CGTN En Español, ABC Televisión)	45 kW	Multimedios Televisión
30	8	XHJCI-TDT	Cd. Juárez	Televisa Regional (N+ Foro)	200 kW	Televisora de Occidente
8	16	XHCPCN-TDT	Cd. Juárez	Canal Catorce	127.96 kW	Sistema Público de Radiodifusion del Estado Mexicano
36	20	XHCJH-TDT	Cd. Juárez	Azteca 7 (a+)	146.31 kW	Televisión Azteca
32	44	XHIJ-TDT	Cd. Juárez	Canal 44 (44 Alternativo, Canal Catorce, Intermedia Televisión)	86.936 kW	Televisora Nacional
35	50	XEJ-TDT	Cd. Juárez	XEJ (Once Niñas y Niños)	10 kW	Televisión de la Frontera
29	2	XHMAC-TDT	Cd. Madera	Las Estrellas	14 kW	Televimex
22	1	XHCH-TDT	Chihuahua	Azteca Uno (adn40)	51.47 kW	Televisión Azteca
23	1.3	XHIT-TDT	Chihuahua; Cd. Cuauhtémoc	Azteca Uno (-1)	51.41 kW; 23.85 kW	Televisión Azteca
26	2	XHFI-TDT	Chihuahua	Las Estrellas (N+ Foro)	47 kW	Televimex
29	3	XHCTCH-TDT	Chihuahua	Imagen Televisión (Excélsior TV)	52.761 kW	Cadena Tres I, S.A. de C.V.
24	5/9	XHCHZ-TDT	Chihuahua; Cd. Cuauhtémoc	Canal 5 (Nu9ve Chihuahua)	47 kW; 26 kW	Radio Televisión
32	6	XHAUC-TDT	Chihuahua	Multimedios Televisión	45 kW	Telemisión
21	7	XHECH-TDT	Chihuahua; Cd. Cuauhtémoc	Azteca 7 (a+)	44.43 kW; 23.9 kW	Televisión Azteca
25	11	XHCHI-TDT	Chihuahua	Canal Once (Once Niñas y Niños)	130.31 kW	Instituto Politécnico Nacional
34	28	XHABC-TDT	Chihuahua	Canal 28	21.5 kW	Sistema Regional de Televisión
30	44	XHICCH-TDT	Chihuahua; Cd. Cuauhtémoc; Cd. Delicias	Canal 44 (44 Alternativo, Intermedia Televisión)	140.68 kW; 129.78 kW; 25.89 kW	Intermedia de Chihuahua
8	14	XHCPAU-TDT	Chihuahua	Canal Catorce	4.10 kW	Sistema Público de Radiodifusion del Estado Mexicano
25	1	XHHPC-TDT	Hidalgo del Parral	Azteca Uno (adn40)	8.97 kW	Televisión Azteca
26	2/5	XHHPT-TDT	Hidalgo del Parral	Las Estrellas (Canal 5)	24 kW	Televimex
22	7	XHHDP-TDT	Hidalgo del Parral	Azteca 7	9.03 kW	Televisión Azteca
30	13	XHMH-TDT	Hidalgo del Parral	Multimedios Televisión	25 kW	Pedro Luis Fitzmaurice Meneses
24	1/7	XHCGC-TDT	Nuevo Casas Grandes	Azteca Uno (Azteca 7)	9.63 kW	Televisión Azteca
27	2/5	XHNCG-TDT	Nuevo Casas Grandes	Las Estrellas (Canal 5)	34 kW	Televimex
16	1/7	XHHR-TDT	Ojinaga	Azteca Uno (Azteca 7)	1.13 kW	Televisión Azteca
15	2	XHOCH-TDT	Ojinaga	Las Estrellas	23 kW	Televimex
35	2	XHBVT-TDT	San Buenaventura	Las Estrellas	25 kW	Televimex
34	2	XHSAC-TDT	Santa Barbara	Las Estrellas	23 kW	Televimex

== Defunct stations ==
- XHJMA-TV 3, Hidalgo del Parral (1969–2014)

== See also ==
- List of television stations in Texas and List of television stations in New Mexico for stations across the US border
