= K27OJ-D =

Television station in El Paso, Texas

- El Paso, Texas; Ciudad Juárez, Chihuahua; United States–Mexico
- City: El Paso, Texas
- Channels: Digital: 27 (UHF); Virtual: 25
- Branding: Voz y Visión TV

Programming
- Affiliations: see § Subchannels

Ownership
- Owner: Martín Lorenzo Smith; (BGM License LLC)
- Operator: Grupo Multimedios

History
- First air date: March 6, 1998
- Former call signs: K69IB (1998–2001); K40FW (2001–2011); K26KJ (2011–2015); K26KJ-D (2015–2019)
- Former channel numbers: Analog: 69 (UHF, 1998–2001), 40 (UHF, 2001–2011), 26 (UHF, 2011–2015); Digital: 26 (UHF, 2015–2019)
- Former affiliations: XHIJ-TV (1998–2003); Silent (2003–2004); Mas Música TV (2004–2006); Milenio Televisión (2009-2012); Teleritmo (2015–2017); Multimedios Televisión (2006–2009, 2012–2020)

Technical information
- Licensing authority: FCC
- Facility ID: 59114
- Class: LD
- ERP: 15 kW
- HAAT: 540.9 m (1,775 ft)
- Transmitter coordinates: 31°44′36″N 106°28′56″W

Links
- Public license information: LMS

K27OJ-D (channel 25) is a low-power television station in El Paso, Texas, United States. The station is controlled by Grupo Multimedios, owned through Martín Lorenzo Smith and BGM License.

The station currently carries Voz y Visión TV on its main 25.1 subchannel.

== History ==
K27OJ-D began broadcasting as K69IB (channel 69) on March 6, 1998. It broadcast commonly owned XHIJ-TV, becoming the last new station in the El Paso–Las Cruces–Ciudad Juárez area in analog (after the sign-on of Azteca 7 transmitter XHCJH-TV, but before the sign-on of Imagen Televisión transmitter XHCTCJ). Its licensee was owned by United States citizens who are members of the same Cabada family that owns XHIJ.

The station changed its callsign to K40FW and moved to channel 40 in 2001 in order to clear channels 60 through 69. The station went silent in 2003, returning as a Más Musica TV affiliate; in 2006, it began broadcasting Multimedios Televisión.

In 2011, the station became K26KJ on analog channel 26. The station held a permit to flash-cut to digital channel 26, but it did not convert to digital until after Ciudad Juárez's analog stations went off the air; analog channel 26 left the air at noon on July 15, 2015, and K26KJ digital launched in its place. However, the station uses virtual channel 25, as KINT-TV (RF channel 25) uses virtual channel 26. The station was licensed for digital operation on July 24, 2015, and changed its call sign to K26KJ-D.

On June 23, 2017, Cabada Holdings, LLC (formerly Broadcast Group, Ltd.) agreed to sell K26KJ-D's license to Martin Lorenzo Smith, Grupo Multimedios' international public relations and sales' director in the U.S. This made K26KJ-D the first television station owned and operated by an American employee of Grupo Multimedios. The deal was approved by the FCC on August 9, 2017, but consummation did not occur until March 7, 2018.

In July 2017, K26KJ-D began carrying a feed of XHABC-TDT, a local television station in Chihuahua, Chihuahua, on its third digital subchannel. This arrangement brought Canal 28, known as "ABC Televisión" in the Juárez area, to over-the-air viewers in Juárez for the first time, complementing XHABC's own transmitters in Chihuahua and Ciudad Cuauhtémoc.

Multimedios Televisión bid for and won a television station in Ciudad Juárez as part of the IFT's IFT-6 television station auction in 2017. This station, XHMTCH-TDT RF 28 (virtual channel 6), came on the air in October 2018.

On April 10, 2019, K26KJ-D changed its call sign to K27OJ-D, as it was repacked from physical channel 26 to 27.

== Subchannels ==
Subchannels of K27OJ-D
| Channel | Res. | Short name | Programming |
|---|---|---|---|
| 25.1 | 1080i | VOZYVIS | Voz y Visión TV |
| 25.2 | 480i | TLRTMO | Teleritmo |
| 25.3 | 480i | CCBM | Spanish religious |
