= Channel 15 =

Channel 15 or TV15 may refer to:

- CCTV-15, a Chinese television channel
- NewsWatch 15, a regional cable news television network based in New Orleans, Louisiana
- Pink 15, a former Macedonian private television channel
- La Tele (Peruvian TV network), formerly Uranio 15, a peruvian free-to-air television channel
- Canal 15 (Nicaraguan TV channel), a television channel in Nicaragua

== Canada ==
The following television stations operate on virtual channel 15 in Canada:

- CIVK-DT in Carleton, Quebec
- CIVQ-DT in Quebec City, Quebec
- CKMI-DT-1 in Montreal, Quebec

== Mexico ==
The following television stations broadcast on digital channel 15 (UHF frequencies covering 476-482 MHz) in Mexico:

- XHCRO-TDT in Carbó, Sonora
- XHCTCY-TDT in Querétaro, Querétaro
- XHFA-TDT in Nogales, Sonora
- XHOCH-TDT in Ojinaga, Chihuahua
- XHOQT-TDT in Oquitoa, Sonora
- XHRON-TDT in Rayón, Sonora
- XHSAS-TDT in Santa Ana, Sonora
- XHVTV-TDT in Matamoros, Tamaulipas
- Channel 15 in Yucatán, Mexico

The following television stations operate on virtual channel 15 in Mexico:

=== Regional networks ===
- Telemax in the state of Sonora

=== Local stations ===
- XHSDD-TDT in Sabinas, Coahuila
- XHFGL-TDT and XHRCSP-TDT in Durango and Santiago Papasquiaro, Durango
- XHCEP-TDT in Celaya, Guanajuato
- XHCMO-TDT in Cuernavaca, Morelos
- XHRIO-TDT in Matamoros, Tamaulipas
- XHZAC-TDT in Zacatecas, Zacatecas

== See also ==
- Channel 15 TV stations in Canada
- Channel 15 branded TV stations in the United States
- Channel 15 digital TV stations in the United States
- Channel 15 low-power TV stations in the United States
- Channel 15 virtual TV stations in the United States
