= Channel 29 =

Channel 29 refers to several television stations:

== Canada ==
The following television stations operate on virtual channel 29 in Canada:

- CFTF-DT in Rivière-du-Loup, Quebec
- CFTU-DT in Montreal, Quebec
- CHNM-DT-1 in Victoria, British Columbia
- CIII-DT-29 in Sarnia-Oil Springs, Ontario

== Mexico ==
The following television stations operate on virtual channel 29 in Mexico:

- XHENB-TDT in Ensenada, Baja California
- XHMAP-TDT in Monclova, Coahuila (assigned)

== Philippines ==
- DZRJ-TV (RJTV 29)

== Other countries ==
- Canal 29 (Chinandega), a former television station in Chinandega, Nicaragua

== Other ==
- Channel 29 virtual TV stations in the United States

For UHF frequencies covering 561.25-565.75 MHz

- Channel 29 TV stations in Canada
- Channel 29 TV stations in Mexico
- Channel 29 digital TV stations in the United States
- Channel 29 low-power TV stations in the United States
