= List of television stations in Coahuila =

The following is a list of all CRT-licensed over-the-air television stations broadcasting in the Mexican state of Coahuila. There are 40 television stations in Coahuila.

== List of television stations ==
RF	VC	Call sign	Location	Network/name	ERP	Concessionaire
35	2	XHWDT-TDT	Allende	Las Estrellas	40 kW	Televimex
25	1	XHHE-TDT	Ciudad Acuña; Piedras Negras	Azteca Uno (adn40)	4.21 kW; 3.64 kW	Televisión Azteca
34	2	XHAMC-TDT	Ciudad Acuña	Las Estrellas	50 kW	Televimex
27	5	XHCHW-TDT	Ciudad Acuña	Canal 5	50 kW	Radio Televisión
36	58	XHCAW-TDT	Ciudad Acuña	RCG Acuña (RCG Saltillo)	20.9 kW	Hilda Graciela Rivera Flores
24	1	XHHC-TDT	Monclova	Azteca Uno (adn40)	11.69 kW	Televisión Azteca
35	2	XHMOT-TDT	Monclova	Las Estrellas	50 kW	Televimex
29	5	XHMLC-TDT	Monclova	Canal 5	50 kW	Radio Televisión
33	6	XHMTCO-TDT	Monclova	Canal 6	45.052 kW	Multimedios Televisión
27	7	XHMLA-TDT	Monclova	Azteca 7 (a+)	11.66 kW	Televisión Azteca
36	29	XHMAP-TDT	Monclova	Canal 29	16.723 kW	Frente Ciudadano Pro-Antena Parabólica de Monclova
29	1	XHPFC-TDT	Parras de la Fuente	Azteca Uno (adn40)	10.92 kW	Televisión Azteca
22	2/5	XHPAC-TDT	Parras de la Fuente	Las Estrellas (Canal 5)	62 kW	Televimex
28	7	XHPFE-TDT	Parras de la Fuente	Azteca 7	10.93 kW	Televisión Azteca
30	2	XHPNT-TDT	Piedras Negras	Las Estrellas	43 kW	Televimex
31	5	XHPNH-TDT	Piedras Negras	Canal 5	43 kW	Radio Televisión
32	7	XHPNG-TDT	Piedras Negras; Ciudad Acuña	Azteca 7 (a+)	16.33 kW; 6.22 kW	Televisión Azteca
20	9	XHPN-TDT	Piedras Negras	Nu9ve Piedras Negras	43 kW	Teleimagen del Noroeste
33	12	XHPNW-TDT	Piedras Negras	Súper Channel 12/Multimedios (XHPNW -2 hours)	15 kW	XHFJS-TV
26	1	XHCJ-TDT	Sabinas	Azteca Uno (adn40)	9.98 kW	Televisión Azteca
23	2	XHRDC-TDT	Nueva Rosita	Las Estrellas	42 kW	Televimex
29	5	XHNOH-TDT	Nueva Rosita	Canal 5	42 kW	Radio Televisión
34	7	XHSBC-TDT	Nueva Rosita	Azteca 7	0.2 kW	Televisión Azteca
21	15	XHSDD-TDT	Sabinas	Independent (Canal 5 Sabinas -2 hours)	20 kW	Grupo Comunik
26	3	XHCTSA-TDT	Saltillo	Imagen Televisión (Excélsior TV)	50 kW	Cadena Tres I, S.A. de C.V.
20	5	XHSTC-TDT	Saltillo	Canal 5	45 kW	Radio Televisión
33	7	XHLLO-TDT	Saltillo	Azteca 7 (a+)	8.74 kW	Televisión Azteca
30	8	XHRCG-TDT	Saltillo	RCG Saltillo	31 kW	Roberto Casimiro González Treviño
24	9	XHAE-TDT	Saltillo	Nu9ve	45 kW	Teleimagen del Noroeste
36	10	XHTSCO-TDT	Saltillo	Tele Saltillo (Tele Saltillo -2, -3, -4)	45 kW	Tele Saltillo
31	11	XHCPDF-TDT	Saltillo	Canal Once (Once Niñas y Niños)	9.08 kW	Instituto Politécnico Nacional
13		XHPEAB-TDT	Saltillo			Radio Cultural del Centro, A.C.
17	17	XHPBSA-TDT	Saltillo	Coahuila Televisión	15.2 kW	Gobierno del Estado de Coahuila
14	1	XHGDP-TDT	Torreón	Azteca Uno (adn40)	188.17 kW	Televisión Azteca
20	2	XHO-TDT	Torreón	Las Estrellas (N+ Foro)	150 kW	Televimex
24	3	XHCTTR-TDT	Torreón	Imagen Televisión (Excélsior TV)	160 kW	Cadena Tres I, S.A. de C.V.
35	5	XELN-TDT	Torreón	Canal 5	150 kW	Radio Televisión
23	6	XHOAH-TDT	Torreón	Canal 6 (Milenio Televisión, CGTN En Español, Popcorn Central)	47.5 kW	Multimedios Televisión
18	7	XHGZP-TDT	Torreón	Azteca 7 (a+)	187.38 kW	Televisión Azteca
26	9	XHTOB-TDT	Torreón	Nu9ve	150 kW	Teleimagen del Noroeste
22	14	XHSPO-TDT	Torreón (Note: The XHSPO transmitter is co-sited with Canal Once in Gómez Palacio, Durango.)	Canal Catorce	21.93 kW	Sistema Público de Radiodifusión del Estado Mexicano

== Defunct stations ==
- XHIA-TV 2, Torreón (1967–2006)

== See also ==
- List of television stations in Texas for stations across the US border serving cities in Coahuila
- Television stations in Durango for stations in Gómez Palacio
