= Channel 19 TV stations in Mexico =

The following television stations broadcast on digital channel 19 in Mexico:

- XERV-TDT in Reynosa, Tamaulipas
- XEWH-TDT in Hermosillo, Sonora
- XHATU-TDT in Atotonilco el Alto, Jalisco
- XHCDE-TDT in Ciudad Delicias, Chihuahua
- XHCEP-TDT in Celaya, Guanajuato
- XHCMO-TDT in Cuernavaca, Morelos
- XHCOL-TDT in Colima, Colima
- XHFAS-TDT in Fronteras, Sonora
- XHGVH-TDT in Guadalupe Victoria, Durango
- XHHHN-TDT in Huajuapan de León, Oaxaca
- XHIMS-TDT in Ímuris, Sonora
- XHSPRMO-TDT in Morelia, Michoacán
- XHTMTU-TDT in Tulum, Quintana Roo
- XHTMVE-TDT in Xalapa, Veracruz
- XHTOL-TDT on Jocotitlán, State of Mexico
- XHWX-TDT in Monterrey, Nuevo León
- XHZAT-TDT in Zacatecas, Zacatecas
