= Teleritmo =

Mexican television network

- Type: Terrestrial television network
- Country: Mexico
- Availability: Mexico
- Headquarters: Monterrey, N.L., Mexico
- Broadcast area: North America
- Owner: Grupo Multimedios
- Key people: Francisco González
- Digital channel: PSIP 6.3 (most of Mexico)
- Official website: Multimedios

Teleritmo (alternately known as TLR) is a network of Spanish language television stations primarily concentrated in northeastern Mexico and the southwestern United States. The system is part of Grupo Multimedios. The flagship station of Teleritmo is XHSAW-TDT located in Monterrey, Nuevo León. Programming features Mexican regional music and music appeal variety programming.

== Teleritmo affiliates ==
The following is a list of Multimedios Television affiliates that broadcast Teleritmo on its third subchannel 6.3 in Mexico:

RF	VC	Call sign	Location	ERP	Concessionaire
25	6.3	XHAW-TDT	Monterrey, N.L. Saltillo, Coah.	120 kW; 37.5 kW	Televisión Digital
23	6.3	XHOAH-TDT	Torreón, Coah.	47.5 kW	Multimedios Televisión
31	6.3	XHLGG-TDT	Cerro Los Tenamastes, Jal. León	47.5 kW; 70 kW	Multimedios Televisión
25	6.3	XHVTU-TDT	Ciudad Victoria, Tamaulipas	20 kW	Multimedios Televisión
15	6.3	XHVTV-TDT	Matamoros, Tamps. Reynosa, Tamps.	35 kW; 40 kW	Televisión Digital
26	6.3	XHNAT-TDT	Nuevo Laredo, Tamaulipas	54.34 kW	Multimedios Televisión
14	6.3	XHTAO-TDT	Tampico, Tamaulipas	12.5 kW	Multimedios Televisión
27	6.3	XHTDMX-TDT	Ciudad De Mexico	170 kW; 3.98 kW	Television Digital
34	6.3	XHTDJA-TDT	Guadalajara, Jalisco	200 kW	Television Digital
15	6.3	XHMTPU-TDT	Puebla, Puebla	122.5 kW	Multimedios Television

=== Pay TV availability ===
Teleritmo is available across the United States on many cable, satellite and IPTV systems, including DirecTV, Dish/Sling, Comcast, Spectrum, AT&T U-Verse, Verizon FiOS and Grande Communications. It is carried in both standard definition and high definition versions. In 2016, the network also became available in Costa Rica (the third largest Mexican diaspora behind the United States and Guatemala) through cable.
