= XHSAW-TDT =

Television station in Sabinas Hidalgo (1999–2021)

- Sabinas Hidalgo–Monterrey, Nuevo León; Mexico
- City: Sabinas Hidalgo, Nuevo León
- Channels: Digital: 21 (UHF); Virtual: 12

Programming
- Subchannels: see § Subchannels

Ownership
- Owner: Grupo Multimedios; (Televisión Digital, S.A. de C.V.)

History
- Founded: 1999
- Last air date: December 31, 2021
- Former call signs: XHSAW-TV (1999–2015)
- Former channel numbers: Analog: 38/64 (UHF; 1999–2015); Virtual: 12 (2006–2016, 2018–2021); 13 (2016–2018)
- Former affiliations: Independent (1999–2009)Milenio Televisión (2009–2012); Teleritmo (2012–2014; secondary until 2009); Delayed relay of XHAW-TDT (2014–2017)
- Call sign meaning: Sabinas Hidalgo/XHSAW

Technical information
- ERP: 6.67 kW; 52.5 kW (Monterrey)
- HAAT: 46 m
- Transmitter coordinates: 26°28′57.56″N 100°11′27.63″W
- Translator(s): RF 21 Monterrey, N.L.

XHSAW-TDT (channel 12) was a television station licensed to Sabinas Hidalgo, Nuevo León, Mexico, and served the Monterrey area. It was owned by Multimedios Televisión.

== History ==
XHSAW received its concession on August 1, 1994. The original concessionaire was Multimedios head Francisco Antonio González Sánchez.

The concession for XHSAW was not renewed, with the station closing on December 31, 2021.

== Subchannels ==
The station's digital signal is multiplexed:

Channel	Res.	Short name	Programming
12.1	1080i	XHSAW	Teleritmo
12.2	480i	XHSAW	Milenio Televisión
12.3	480i	XHSAW	CV Shopping
12.4	480i	XHSAW	MVS TV

On September 24, 2015, XHSAW shut off its analog signal; its digital signal on UHF channel 21 remained. Until 2016, XHSAW shared major virtual channel 12 with XHAW-TDT. It used channel 13 between 2017 and 2018, when it moved back to 12 after Multimedios's other stations changed to channel 6.

On March 4, 2020, the IFT authorized the removal of Milenio TV in favor of sports channel xMD, with Teleritmo moving to XHSAW-TDT2; the change would have seen Milenio move to XHAW's spectrum. The move never took place due to the COVID-19 pandemic effectively making the move of xMD non-viable.
