= List of television stations in Durango =

The following is a list of all CRT-licensed over-the-air television stations broadcasting in the Mexican state of Durango. There are 21 television stations in Durango.

== List of television stations ==
RF	VC	Call sign	Location	Network/name	ERP	Concessionaire
22	1/7	XHVEL-TDT	Cuéncame	Azteca Uno (Azteca 7)	4.57 kW	Televisión Azteca
26	1	XHDB-TDT	Durango	Azteca Uno (adn40)	12.83 kW	Televisión Azteca
21	2	XHDI-TDT	Durango; Santiago Papasquiaro (RF 17)	Las Estrellas (FOROtv)	94 kW; 50 kW	Televisa
24	3	XHCTDG-TDT	Durango	Imagen Televisión (Excélsior TV)	37.485 kW	Cadena Tres I, S.A. de C.V.
22	4	XHUAD-TDT	Durango	TV Lobo	4 kW	Fomento Educativo y Cultural Francisco de Ibarra, A.C.
17	5	XHDUH-TDT	Durango	Canal 5 (13.1 Nu9ve Durango)	94 kW	Televisa
29	6	XHMTDU-TDT	Durango	Canal 6 (Milenio Televisión, Popcorn Central)	75 kW	Multimedios Televisión
32	7	XHDRG-TDT	Durango; Santiago Papasquiaro	Azteca 7 (a+)	12.7 kW	Televisión Azteca
11	8	XHUNES-TDT	Durango	España TV	1.48 kW	Universidad Autónoma España de Durango
28	9	XHUJED-TDT	Durango	TV UJED	10 kW	Universidad Juárez del Estado de Durango
36	10	XHA-TDT	Durango	Canal 10	50 kW	TV Diez Durango
33	11	XHDGO-TDT	Durango	Canal Once (Once Niñas y Niños)	10.04 kW	Instituto Politécnico Nacional
30	12	XHND-TDT	Durango	Canal Doce	14 kW	Organizacion Editorial de Mexico
12	14	XHCPBJ-TDT	Durango	Canal Catorce	52.468 kW	Sistema Público de Radiodifusión del Estado Mexicano
7	15	XHFGL-TDT	Durango	Canal 15	32.280 kW	Fundación Garza Limón
34	11	XHGPD-TDT	Gómez Palacio	Canal Once (Once Niñas y Niños)	14.23 kW	Instituto Politécnico Nacional
19	1	XHGVH-TDT	Guadalupe Victoria	Azteca Uno (adn40)	4.83 kW	Televisión Azteca
25	7	XHSPC-TDT	San Pedro	Azteca 7	5.09 kW	Televisión Azteca
27	1	XHPAP-TDT	Santiago Papasquiaro	Azteca Uno (adn40)	1.79 kW	Televisión Azteca
22	15	XHRCSP-TDT	Santiago Papasquiaro	Canal 15	22.56 kW	Radio Comunicación Gamar

== See also ==
- Television stations in Coahuila for most stations in the Comarca Lagunera
