= XHMH-TDT =

Television station in Hidalgo del Parral, Chihuahua, Mexico

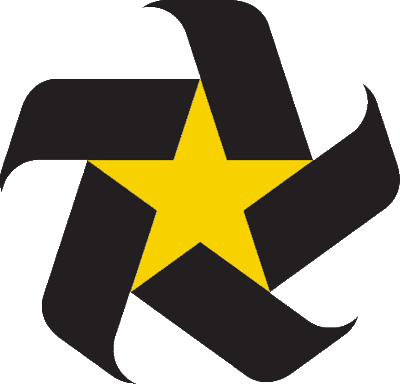

Hidalgo del Parral, Chihuahua; Mexico
- Channels: Digital: 30 (UHF); Virtual: 6
- Branding: Canal 13 Parral

Programming
- Affiliations: Multimedios Televisión

Ownership
- Owner: Pedro Luis Fitzmaurice Meneses

History
- Founded: June 16, 1977 (concession)
- Call sign meaning: Pedro Meneses Hoyos (original concessionaire)

Technical information
- ERP: 25 kW
- Transmitter coordinates: 26°55′39.63″N 105°37′45.07″W

Links
- Website: canal13parral.com

XHMH-TDT is a television station in Hidalgo del Parral, Chihuahua, Mexico. It broadcasts on virtual channel 13 and currently carries Multimedios Televisión programming.

== History ==
XHMH-TV received its concession on June 16, 1977. It was owned by Pedro Meneses Hoyos, who was part of a pioneering family in Chihuahua broadcasting. The Meneses were involved in the foundation of XEJ and XEPM television in Ciudad Juárez. XHMH originally broadcast on channel 12 with an effective radiated power of 5,500 watts, but in the 1980s it moved to channel 13 and later raised its power to 85,000 watts.

Canal 13 was transferred to Meneses's successor, Beatriz Molinar Fernández, after his death on May 5, 1998. After her death, the station passed to Pedro Luis Fitzmaurice Meneses.

In 2014, digital facilities for XHMH were authorized, and it built XHMH-TDT on digital channel 30 (using PSIP to show as channel 13.1).

Until 2019, XHMH was a Televisa local station, considered as part of the preponderant economic agent in broadcasting. It was one of the smallest local stations in the Televisa family; it also produced local Parral Informa newscasts. In early 2019, however, XHMH ended its relationship with Televisa and canceled the local newscasts, prompting longtime anchor Jaime Nájera to leave the station after 16 years at XHMH. The station now takes statewide programming from Multimedios, which now airs on XHMTCH-TDT in Juárez and XHAUC-TDT in Chihuahua Capital.

== See also ==
- XHJMA-TV, another local station that operated from 1969-2014
