= Roberto Hernández Jr. =

Mexican journalist and sportscaster

- Born: 25 January 1938; Irapuato, Guanajuato, Mexico
- Died: 3 September 2017 (aged 79); Monterrey, Nuevo León, Mexico
- Occupation: Sportscaster
- Website: Futbol al Día

Roberto Hernández Jr. or Roberto Hernandez Vazquez (25 January 1938 – 3 September 2017) was a Mexican journalist and sportscaster from Monterrey. He headed the sportscasting team of Multimedios Televisión and Radio and was a commentator for games of the local teams Tigres UANL and C.F. Monterrey. He narrated 6 local Finals: Monterrey vs Tampico Madero, Monterrey vs Atlante, Tigres vs Pachuca (2), Tigres vs Santos, and Tigres vs America. He was also a columnist for Milenio Diario, the national newspaper owned by Multimedios.

A controversial figure, Hernández and his programs were very popular in Monterrey. Due to his own popularity and the popularity of the subjects he dealt with, he was one of the most influential persons in Monterrey media.

He started his career in Monterrey México at XERG Radio 690 kHz of Jesús D González (Multimedios) and later at XEFB 630 kHz Radio and XHNL Channel 10 (today Televisa Monterrey )and later In television, became a directive of channel 6 Televisión Independiente de México or (TIM) that later in 1973 became Televisa (television via satellite) with the fusion of TIM and Telesistema mexicano (TSM). Then channel 6 became channel 8 in Mexico City, where he was a reporter covering the FIFA World Cup, but was later dismissed from Televisa, amid controversy. In 1982, he returned to Estrellas de oro (Today Multimedios) and started a new television program in channel 12 of Monterrey Futbol al dia starting with 10-minute program that turned into 1 hour daily, 6 days a week for 35 years. During this time Televisa called him back to narrate Mexico 1986, Italy 1990 and USA 1994.
