= Televisión Independiente de México =

Former Mexican television network

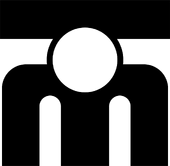
Logo of Independent Mexican Television (TIM).

Televisión Independiente de México (transl. 'Independent Television of Mexico'; known on air as TIM or Cadena TIM) was a Mexican national television network founded in 1965 by Eugenio Garza Sada. It operated until 1973, when it merged with its primary competitor, Telesistema Mexicano, owned by Emilio Azcárraga Vidaurreta, to form the Televisa conglomerate. Televisa absorbed all of TIM's assets, including its television transmitters and its series, including pioneering programs such as El Chavo del Ocho.

== History ==
=== 1965–68: From Monterrey south ===
Grupo Monterrey, a prolific regional conglomerate owned by the Garza Sada family, decided to enter the television business. In 1963, its subsidiary Televisión del Norte, S.A. obtained the concession to opeate XET-TV, channel 6 in the city of Monterrey on April 5, 1963, signing on in 1965. This was the first step towards an expansion to a national scale, obtaining the license of XHFM-TV, channel 2 en the port of Veracruz, and later, XHP-TV, channel 3 in Puebla.

As part of the strategy, Teleproductora Independiente de México was created, which started hiring Cuban creatives who fled the country after the Cuban Revolution (producing with them the television version of the classic radio format, La Tremenda Corte), and with other local talents, started to form a schedule with new innovative concepts, such as the so-called "railroad shows" (programas-ferrocarril) on weekends, called that way due to their variety, connected and directed by a main presenter.

Unlike other stations which were founded in Mexico City, which was the largest media market in the country, TIM was founded in the northern Mexican city of Monterrey, where Garza Sada already owned a brewery (Cervecería Cuauhtémoc, now part of Heineken) and a glass factory, among other assets. The goal of TIM was to provide an alternative to the television stations located in Mexico City, chiefly XEW-TV on channel 2, XHTV-TV on channel 4, and XHGC-TV on channel 5.

In Monterrey TIM received the channel 6 allocation, which it built as XET-TV. It then sought to enter other major Mexican markets before eventually targeting Mexico City, a task that had TIM building stations elsewhere. In Veracruz it built and signed on XHFM-TV channel 2, and in Puebla it created XHP-TV channel 3, placed midway between Veracruz and Mexico City. It was in Puebla that José Ramón Fernández, one of Mexico's pioneering sports journalists, got his start.

TIM finally entered Mexico City in 1967, in time for the 1968 Summer Olympics. In Mexico City, TIM received a concession for channel 8, which was given the callsign XHTM-TV. It built new facilities in the San Ángel neighborhood. TIM's entry into Mexico City put it into direct competition with Telesistema Mexicano, which had just been formed between Azcárraga, XHTV owner Romulo O'Farrill Jr., and the shares of the deceased Guillermo González Camarena (owner of XHGC), for viewers in the nation's capital. Its regular broadcasts started on January 25, 1969.

Per petition of President Díaz Ordaz, Salas Peyró associated with Grupo Monterrey to form a network with Grupo Monterrey's stations, with Channel 8 as its basis. The new network established itself at the studios of the former "San Ángel Inn" movie theatre and used the facilities to create telenovelas and other groundbreaking programs. After a brief period, Salas Peyró decided to leave the business and sold his shares to Grupo Monterrey.

With four stations in key markets, especially in the country's capital, thanks to its schedule, the new network becomes a real threat to Telesistema Mexicano which up until then had been in a hegemonical position in the country.

=== 1968–70: Telecadena Mexicana ===
Movie businessman Manuel Barbachano Ponce founds Telecadena Mexicana, establishing its first channel in Monterrey on February 24, 1968, expanding later to 15 television stations across Mexico's territory. The central characteristic was the privilege of feature films in its schedule, in place of being "filler" like the other television companies. Out of the stations that made up Telecadena, three stations in the north of the country, were owned to a concessionaire other than Barbachano, being licensed to José Manuel Acosta Castañeda.

=== 1970–72: At war with Telesistema Mexicano ===
In January 1970, Manuel Barbachano Ponce, due to financial problems, decided to affiliate 11 out of the 15 Telecadena Mexicana stations to Canal 8, thus forming Televisión Independiente de México or Cadena TIM, achieving coverage in 50% of Mexican territory.

With this, an intense war between the two giants of Mexican television, TIM and Telesistema Mexicano, broke out. TIM presented its new, groundbreaking formats and new faces such as Roberto Gómez Bolaños "Chespirito", who had been a scriptwriter for the comic pair "Viruta y Capulina", and was now presenting himself performing characters that later became true Latin American television icons, such as El Chapulín Colorado and El Chavo; from this last one, it's been told that viewers colloquially called him as "El Chavo del 8" for the channel in which it aired. Room was given to other comic artists such as Los Polivoces. Following the concept of the railroad programs, presenter Raúl Velasco, in his Domingos Espectaculares program, became one of Mexico's most famous television presenters with his programs running for several hours, where national and international artists were presented and new artists were revealed, such as comedian María Elena Velasco, La India María. Using its film studios, iconic productions were created, and thanks to an agreement with a company with Peruvian capitals, Panamericana Televisión de México, TIM's productions are exported to other countries in the region and, in an exclusive manner, broadcast the Peruvian adaptation of Simplemente María, which became a standard for the genre.

Telesistema Mexicano began to lose, not only in ratings and money, but also strong advertisers such as Procter & Gamble and even key figures who were vital to the Azcárraga company, like Luis de Llano Palmer, who produced the successful gameshow Juan Pirulero for Canal 8. Nevertheless, the program was criticized from its beginning, as the opinion of some viewers denigrated the public in the nature of its games that had as a prize, most of the time, small appliances such as blenders or irons. On the other side, Telesistema Mexicano managed to obtain Raúl Velasco, taking the advantage that the presenter parted from TIM when the network decided to change the format of his show. His new show, Siempre en domingo, continued in the same format as Domingos Espectaculares.

== Merger and legacy ==
Even with the growing success of TIM, losses began to increase at both television companies, due to taxes and government fees on the television stations and other business factors. Emilio Azcárraga Milmo, son of the founder of Telesistema Mexicano, began secret talks with Bernardo Garza Sada to create a conglomerate that benefitted both companies to avoid more losses. On the other hand, and despite the company's economic situation, Emilio Azcárraga Vidaurreta refused to have a partnership with its biggest competitor. On September 23, 1972, Emilio Azcárraga Vidaurreta died. The merger process of TIM and Telesistema Mexicano finally began. After convincing the government of Luis Echeverría, the merger of the two television companies was approved, signing on November 28, 1972 the agreement that gave rise to the new television company, which would be 75% integrated by Telesistema Mexicano and 25% by Independent Television of Mexico. Thus, on January 8, 1973, the new company called 'Televisión Vía Satélite, S.A.' was formally initiated. de C.V., a business later and better known as Televisa.

The XHTM-based television network was slowly dismantled, with the transmitters being used to broadcast Televisa's other national networks.

In 1985, the Mexican government sought to build a channel 7 in Mexico City under the auspices of Imevisión, which was given the callsign XHIMT-TV. In order to facilitate the additional station, a frequency and callsign change was conducted involving XHTM and Televisa's XEQ-TV channel 9 in Puebla. The end result was that the Mexico City station became XEQ-TV, channel 9. Meanwhile, XEX-TV channel 7 moved to channel 8, while the Puebla XEQ became XHTM-TV, a rebroadcaster of XEW-TV located on channel 10. XEQ was primarily available in Mexico City until Televisa received approval in 1993 to extend its reach with 62 new transmitters.

Significant competition in Mexican television would not return until the 1990s and the privatization of Imevisión into a new company, Televisión Azteca, which inherited Imevisión's channels 7 and 13.

== Stations that took part in the network ==
Callsign	Channel	Coverage	Notes	Current situation
Grupo Monterrey's stations.
XHTM-TV	8	Mexico City and metropolitan area.	Originally, owned by Radio Mil (the callsign alludes to Tele Mil). Later transferred to Grupo Monterrey's total control. It was the TIM network's main station	Total control held by Televisa since 1973. In 1985, it changes its callsign and frequency to XEQ-TV, channel 9. It is the head station of NU9VE
XET-TV	6	Monterrey, N.L.	Grupo Monterrey's original station that gave birth to the TIM network.	Total control held by Televisa since 1973. Relayer of Canal 5
XHP-TV	3	Puebla, Pue.		Total control held by Televisa since 1973. After the realignment of virtual channels on digital terrestrial television, the station is now Televisa Puebla, channel 4.1, Foro's national number.
XHFM-TV	2	Veracruz, Ver.		Total control held by Televisa since 1973. Today it is the head station of the TeleVer regional network.
Telecadena Mexicana's stations.
XHCH-TV	2	Chihuahua, Chih.	Partial relayer. Was expropriated and became an independent local channel. Later, it became a part of Imevisión.	Part of TV Azteca desde 1993. (Azteca Trece)
XHFA-TV	2	Nogales, Son.	Expropriated to Corporación Mexicana de Radio y Televisión, S.A. de C.V.	Part of TV Azteca since 1993. (Azteca Trece)
XHAQ-TV	5	Mexicali, B.C.	Expropriated to Corporación Mexicana de Radio y Televisión, S.A. de C.V.	Part of TV Azteca desde 1993. (Azteca Trece)
XHAF-TV	4	Tepic, Nay.	Expropriated to Corporación Mexicana de Radio y Televisión, S.A. de C.V.	Part of TV Azteca since 1993. (Azteca Trece)
XHBK-TV	10	Cd. Obregón, Son.	Expropriated, became a part of Corporación Televisiva del Noroeste, relayers of Imevisión's Red Nacional 7.	Part of TV Azteca desde 1993. (Azteca 7)
XHTH-TV	10	Hermosillo, Son.	Expropriated, became a part of Corporación Televisiva del Noroeste, relayers of Imevisión's Red Nacional 7.	Part of TV Azteca since 1993. (Azteca 7, now XHHO-TDT)
XHJMA-TV	3	Parral, Chih.	Owned by José Manuel Acosta Castañeda. Was affiliated to Telecadena and later TIM.	Shut down by IFT in 2014.
XHIA-TV	2	Torreón, Coah.	Owned by José Manuel Acosta Castañeda. Was affiliated to Telecadena and later TIM.	Shut down in the 1990s.
XHCG-TV	12	Los Mochis, Sin.	Owned by José Manuel Acosta Castañeda. Was affiliated to Telecadena and later TIM.	Shut down in the 1990s.
XHTN-TV	7	Nogales, Son.		
XHBL-TV	13	Culiacán, Sin.		

=== Telecadena Mexicana stations not affiliated to TIM ===
Callsign	Channel	Coverage	Notes	Current situation
XHIT-TV	4	Chihuahua, Chih.	Expropriated in 1973, was assigned to Corporación Mexicana de Radio y Televisión, S.A. de C.V.	Part of TV Azteca since 1993. (Azteca Trece (delayed))
XHST-TV	13	Yucatán, Yuc.	Expropriated in 1974, was maintained under control of SOMEX.	Acquired by the government of Yucatán in 1981, now known as TeleYucatán.
XHTQ-TV	9	Querétaro, Qro.	Expropriated to Corporación Mexicana de Radio y Televisión, S.A. de C.V.	Part of TV Azteca since 1993 (Azteca Trece, now XHQUR-TDT).
XHTI-TV	6	Puebla, Pue.	Expropriated to Corporación Mexicana de Radio y Televisión, S.A. de C.V.	Part of TV Azteca since 1993 (Azteca Trece, now XHPUR-TDT).
