= XHIA-TV =

Former TV station in Torreón, Coahuila, Mexico

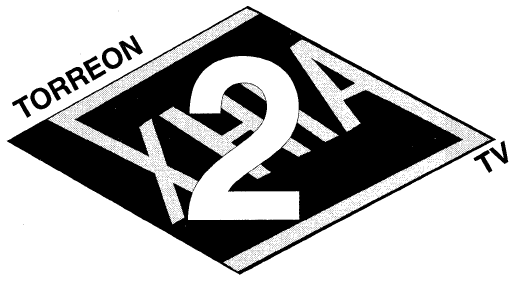
- Torreón, Coahuila; Mexico
- Channels: Analog: 2 (VHF)

Programming
- Affiliations: TIM/Canal 8 (1969–74); Canal 5 (1974-75); Canal 13 (1975–76)

Ownership
- Owner: José Manuel Acosta Castañeda

History
- First air date: December 21, 1966 (concession)
- Last air date: 2006

XHIA-TV was a television station in Torreón, Coahuila, Mexico, broadcasting on channel 2 from 1967 until 2006.

== History ==
On June 21, 1961, José Manuel Acosta Castañeda applied for a television station on channel 2. In December 1964, the Secretariat of Communications and Transportation announced it would grant the application. The station would transmit from the Cerro de las Noas southwest of Torreón with a height above average terrain of 187 meters (614 ft). It was some two years before the station signed on; the final concession was issued on December 21, 1966 with programming on the air by January 1967. XHIA was Torreón's second television station, broadcasting with 2,000 watts. When Castañeda got involved in the creation of the Tele-Cadena Mexicana network, XHIA became part of it and was one of its several stations affiliated to Televisión Independiente de México.

In 1973, Televisión Independiente de México and Telesistema Mexicano merged to form Televisa. For a time, XHIA continued to provide local programs in the early afternoon as well as network shows from "Ocho Color", but by early 1975, XHIA's primary program source had been changed to Canal 5.

In November 1975, the stations of Tele-Cadena Mexicana were expropriated by the Mexican government after TCM collapsed. The station allocations were put up for bidding, and in most areas Corporación Mexicana de Radio y Televisión or Tele-Radio Nacional, two state-owned enterprises, won the concessions and maintained most of the stations as repeaters of the Canal 13 network (today Azteca Uno). Immediately, XHIA dropped its Televisa programming and replaced it with Canal 13. However, preparations were already underway for a full-time Canal 13 repeater, which would be one of the most powerful in the country, when XHIA was forced to change networks.

There were several major exceptions to the process of conversion to Canal 13, however; XHBL channel 13 Culiacán remained on the air for some time with unknown programming, XHST-TV in Mérida remained under SOMEX operation for years until the state government of Yucatán bought it in 1981, and José Manuel Acosta Castañeda maintained XHIA, XHJMA-TV channel 3 in Parral, and XHCG-TV channel 12 in Los Mochis as independents. He made attempts to win television station concessions—including some of the ones he had lost—but he did not meet with success.

After the November 1975, notice that revoked Acosta Castañeda's stations, an official call for bids was put out in November 1976, for a new station on channel 2 in Torreón, which would have held the callsign XHHT-TV. However, this never happened, and by the late 1970s it was listed as being a Tele-Cadena Mexicana station outside of the Canal 13 network, operated with the help of SOMER (Sociedad Mexicana de Radio). This status only applied to XHIA, XHJMA and XHCG. For the next 20 years, XHIA remained on the air as an independent station, though it offered fewer hours of programming than the other stations in the Comarca Lagunera. On one Wednesday in 1986, for instance, the two Televisa stations went on the air in the morning and Canal 13 near midday, but XHIA did not begin programming until 6pm.

By May 8, 1997, when the station celebrated 30 years of broadcasting, XHIA had significantly expanded its local programming. It signed on with a local show known as Amanecer Lagunero, with telenovelas through the day and news and talk programming in the evenings. A week later, however, the station went off the air as 11 unionized employees began a strike that lasted two and a half years. The strikers claimed violations of their collective contract, including unjustified firings and failure to make mandated contributions. The station remained off the air until December 20, 1999, when with the strike resolved, it resumed broadcasting much the same programming; however, in that time, it had lost its coverage on the Torreón cable system, and promotions for XHIA's discussion shows emphasized that it was not on cable.

After a 2004, expiration of their concessions, concerns about the continued legality of the Acosta Castañeda stations arose, and they each disappeared after being raided by federal authorities. For XHIA, that raid came on August 24, 2006, when federal authorities seized the station, by now exclusively broadcasting from a studio at its mountaintop site, and took it off the air.
