= XHNLO-FM =

Radio station in Nuevo Laredo, Tamaulipas, Mexico

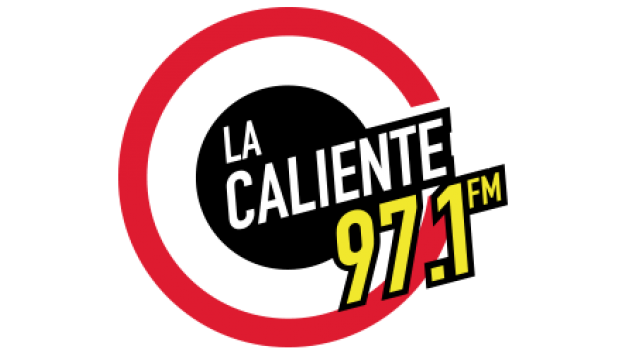
- Nuevo Laredo, Tamaulipas; Mexico
- Broadcast area: Laredo–Nuevo Laredo
- Frequency: 97.1 FM
- Branding: La Caliente

Programming
- Format: Grupera

Ownership
- Owner: Multimedios Radio; (Multimedios Radio, S.A. de C.V.)
- Sister stations: XHGNK-FM; XHNAT-TDT;

History
- First air date: July 23, 1991 (concession)
- Call sign meaning: Nuevo Laredo

Technical information
- Licensing authority: CRT
- Class: B
- ERP: 12.5 kW
- HAAT: 73.56 m (241.3 ft)
- Transmitter coordinates: 27.4872917°N 99.5029995°W

Links
- Webcast: listen live
- Website: www.mmradio.com/lacaliente971/index.php

XHNLO-FM (La Caliente 97.1 FM) is a radio station in Nuevo Laredo, Tamaulipas, Mexico, also serving Laredo, Texas, United States. XHNLO is owned by Multimedios Radio.
