= XHFI-TDT =

Television station in Chihuahua City

- Chihuahua, Chihuahua; Mexico
- Channels: Digital: 26 (UHF); Virtual: 2
- Branding: Las Estrellas

Programming
- Affiliations: 2.1: Las Estrellas; 2.2: N+ Foro

Ownership
- Owner: Grupo Televisa; (Televimex, S.A. de C.V.)
- Sister stations: XHCHZ-TDT

History
- Founded: April 30, 1963 (concession)
- First air date: 1964
- Former call signs: XERA-TV (1964–1969); XHFI-TV (1969–2016)
- Former channel numbers: 11 (analog, 1964–1969), 5 (analog and digital virtual, 1969–2016)

Technical information
- Licensing authority: CRT
- ERP: 47 kW
- HAAT: −76 m (−249 ft)
- Transmitter coordinates: 28°38′48.5″N 106°02′59.65″W

XHFI-TDT (channel 2) is a television station in Chihuahua, Chihuahua, Mexico. The station repeats the Las Estrellas network.

== History ==
XHFI received its concession on April 30, 1963, and signed on in 1964 as XERA-TV; the station broadcast on analog channel 11 and then moved to 5. XERA changed its calls to the current XHFI-TDT by 1969. It was the first television station in the city of Chihuahua. The station was partly local in the mornings until XHAUC-TV signed on in 1996. Digital transmissions began in 2013; the station shut off analog on December 31, 2015.

== Technical information ==
XHFI-TDT broadcasts on RF channel 26 (virtual channel 2). On January 1, 2019, it began carrying FOROtv as its second digital subchannel, relocated from XHCHZ-TDT upon the move of Televisa Chihuahua programming to 5.2.

=== Subchannels ===
Channel	Res.	Short name	Programming
2.1	1080i	XHFI	Las Estrellas
2.2	480i	XHFI	N+ Foro

=== Repeaters ===
RF	Location	ERP
26	General Trías	0.401 kW
26	Bachíniva	0.380 kW
