= XHTDMX-TDT =

Television station in Mexico City

- Mexico City; Mexico
- Channels: Digital: 27 (UHF); Virtual: 6
- Branding: Canal 6

Programming
- Affiliations: 6.1: Canal 6; for others, see § Subchannels

Ownership
- Owner: Grupo Firmas Globales; (Televisión Digital, S.A. de C.V.)

History
- First air date: 2018
- Former channel numbers: 11 (VHF, 2018–2023)
- Call sign meaning: Represents concessionaire (Televisión Digital) and location (Ciudad de México)

Technical information
- Licensing authority: CRT
- ERP: 150 kW
- HAAT: 362.9 m (1,191 ft)
- Transmitter coordinates: 19°31′58″N 99°07′50″W

XHTDMX-TDT (channel 6) is a television station in Mexico City, Mexico, an owned-and-operated station of the Monterrey-based Multimedios Televisión network. Owned by Grupo Firmas Globales through the subsidiary company Televisión Digital, S.A. de C.V., it broadcasts from the Canal Once tower on Cerro del Chiquihuite.

== History ==
XHTDMX was awarded in the IFT-6 television station auction of 2017, held by the Federal Telecommunications Institute (IFT). Multimedios paid Mex$425,929,000 for the concession.

The station began testing on 12 April 2018, making it the first of the six Multimedios stations won in the auction to broadcast, and activated its second and third subchannels on 4 July. Multimedios programming officially launched programming on the main signal the night of 14 August 2018 with the launch of the second season of the network's inter-network dance competition program, Bailadísimo, and began to have the full network programming schedule on-air as of 27 August.

Multimedios is building studio facilities in Mexico City in the former home of the Novedades newspaper to begin local program production in the capital (including a local branch of Multimedios' Telediario news division); the network had previously used a small bureau to cover national news events in the capital. The American cable/satellite version of Multimedios carries the noon-1 p.m. and 7 p.m.-8 p.m. segments of XHTDMX's Telediario broadcasts, along with Futbol al Dia and Multimedios Deportes. The network's Thursday night interview series SNSerio also has begun to originate most weeks from XHTDMX's studios to take advantage of a larger possible guest pool.

In August 2023, the IFT authorized XHTDMX-TDT to move to channel 27, which had been left vacant by the shutdown of XHTRES-TDT the year before.

== Subchannels ==
The station's signal is multiplexed:

Subchannels of XHTDMX-TDT
Channel	Res.	Short name	Programming
6.1	1080i	XHTDMX1	Canal 6
6.2	480i	XHTDMX2	Milenio Televisión
6.3	480i	XHTDMX3	Teleritmo
6.4	480i	XHTDMX4	MVS TV

The 6.2 and 6.3 subchannels use MPEG-4 compression.

The 6.4 subchannel, authorized to carry the MVS TV channel from MVS Comunicaciones, launched on November 5, 2018. In 2019, it was changed to MPEG-2 compression.

== Repeater ==
XHTDMX-TDT has two operating repeaters. One is on RF channel 12 at Tultepec, State of Mexico, broadcasting with 7 kW ERP. Another, on channel 11, was authorized for Valle de Chalco Solidaridad, also with 7 kW ERP, in August 2019. The repeaters were required to move to channel 27 alongside the main transmitter.
