= XHTSCO-TDT =

TV station in Saltillo, Coahuila, Mexico

Saltillo, Coahuila, Mexico; Mexico
- Channels: Digital: 36 (UHF); Virtual: 10
- Branding: Tele Saltillo

Programming
- Affiliations: Commercial independent

Ownership
- Owner: Grupo Zócalo; (Tele Saltillo, S.A. de C.V.)

History
- First air date: December 17, 2018
- Call sign meaning: Tele Saltillo COahuila

Technical information
- ERP: 45 kW
- Transmitter coordinates: 25°25′21″N 101°00′04″W

Links
- Website: telesaltillo.com

XHTSCO-TDT, physical channel 36 and virtual channel 10, is a television station in Saltillo, Coahuila, Mexico. The station is owned by Grupo Zócalo and is known as Tele Saltillo. The station broadcasts from studios co-located with the Zócalo newspaper and a transmitter on Calle Allende.

== History ==
XHTSCO was awarded in the IFT-6 TV station auction of 2017 to Tele Saltillo, a subsidiary of Grupo Zócalo. Zócalo initially announced it would sign on the station on June 13, 2018, to coincide with ten years of the Zócalo newspaper in Saltillo.

The transmitter was turned on in October 2018, with Milenio Televisión programming airing until Tele Saltillo launched at 5:30 am on December 17, 2018. Tele Saltillo's affiliation with Milenio builds on a longstanding relationship between Grupo Zócalo and Multimedios Televisión.

== Subchannels ==
Tele Saltillo carries timeshifted channels on its .2, .3, and .4 channels.
