= XHGNK-FM =

Radio station in Nuevo Laredo, Tamaulipas

Coordinates: 27.4935065°N 99.5156568°W

- Nuevo Laredo, Tamaulipas; Mexico
- Broadcast area: Laredo–Nuevo Laredo
- Frequency: 96.7 MHz (HD Radio)
- Branding: La Lupe

Programming
- Format: Variety hits

Ownership
- Owner: Multimedios Radio; (Multimedios Radio, S.A. de C.V.)
- Sister stations: XHNLO-FM; XHNAT-TDT;

History
- First air date: June 26, 1962 (concession); June 20, 2019 (FM)
- Former call signs: XEGNK-AM (1962–2020)
- Former frequencies: 1370 kHz (1962–2020)
- Call sign meaning: Original concessionaire Guillermo Núñez Keith

Technical information
- Licensing authority: CRT
- Class: A
- ERP: 3,000 watts
- HAAT: 52.4 m (172 ft)

Links
- Webcast: XHGNK-FM
- Website: www.multimedios.com/radio/programas/la-lupe-967-fm-nuevo-laredo

XHGNK-FM (96.7 MHz) is a radio station in Nuevo Laredo, Tamaulipas, Mexico.

== History ==
XEGNK-AM 1370 received its concession on June 26, 1962. It was owned by Guillermo Nuñez Keith.

XEGNK-AM was selected for second-wave AM-FM migration in Nuevo Laredo and signed on XHGNK-FM, the last of five such new FM stations for the city, on June 20, 2019. On July 29, after simulcasting XEGNK-AM with no changes, the new station relaunched as La Lupe 96.7 with the Multimedios Radio format. The IFT approved the transfer of the XHGNK-FM concession from Grupo Radiorama to Multimedios on April 1, 2020. Two months later, on June 20, 2020, the AM was shut down for good.
