= XHNAT-TDT =

Television station in Nuevo Laredo

- Nuevo Laredo, Tamaulipas; Laredo, Texas; Mexico–United States
- City: Nuevo Laredo, Tamaulipas
- Channels: Digital: 32 (UHF); Virtual: 6
- Branding: Canal 6

Programming
- Affiliations: 6.1: Canal 6; for others, see § Subchannels

Ownership
- Owner: Grupo Multimedios; (Multimedios Televisión, S.A. de C.V.)
- Sister stations: XHGNK-FM, XHNLO-FM

History
- Founded: 1994
- Former channel numbers: 45 (analog, 1994–2015, digital to 2016); 12 (digital, 2016–2018)
- Former affiliations: Galavisión
- Call sign meaning: Nuevo Laredo Tamaulipas

Technical information
- Licensing authority: CRT
- ERP: Analog: 597 kW; Digital: 54.340 kW
- HAAT: 57.5 m (189 ft)
- Transmitter coordinates: 27°29′13.30″N 99°30′06.90″W

Links
- Website: Multimedios TV

XHNAT-TDT (channel 6) is a television station in Nuevo Laredo, Tamaulipas, Mexico, serving as an owned and operated station of Canal 6. Its transmitter is located on Avenida Jesús Carranza in Nuevo Laredo. When XHNAT first went on the air it was a Galavisión-rebroadcaster Televisa affiliate, part of the Grupo Multimedios concession of 1994, before they decided to switch to their own television network Multimedios Televisión. Milenio TV and Teleritmo are available on its subchannels 6.2 and 6.3.

== Programming ==
XHNAT broadcasts local-specific newshours of Multimedios's Telediario newscasts for the Two Laredos substituting for those originated from Monterrey, the first airing between 8:00 a.m.-9:00 a.m. CST in the fourth hour of Telediario Matutino, and 8:00 p.m.-9:00 p.m. as a substitution for the second hour of Telediario Nocturno, along with local traffic and weather updates during the network's hourly Telediario updates known as Telediario Al Minuto. Sports programming includes basketball games from the Liga Nacional de Baloncesto Profesional's Nuevo Laredo Bulls, and the Segunda División's Bravos de Nuevo Laredo.

== Technical information ==
=== Subchannels ===
Subchannels of XHNAT-TDT
Channel	Res.	Short name	Programming
6.1	1080i	XHNAT	Canal 6
6.2	480i	XHNAT 2	Milenio TV
6.3	480i	XHNAT 3	Teleritmo (4:3)
6.4	480i	XHNAT 4	MVS TV (4:3)

On July 4, 2011, XHNAT started to broadcast in digital in 1080i format High Definition with an ERP of 54 kW; the station used virtual channel 45. Later in 2012 when Multimedios debuted Multimedios Plus, XHNAT as well as other Multimedios Plus stations switched to standard-definition television with a resolution of 480i. The station's digital signal is multiplexed. XHNAT began testing its two new subchannels 45.2 and 45.3 on April 16, 2013, but it was not until February 7, 2014, that XHNAT began programming them with news network Milenio TV on channel 45.2 in 1080i HD and Norteño music network Teleritmo on channel 45.3 in standard definition. On February 24, 2018, its virtual channel re-located to channel 6 as part of Multimedios' nationwide coverage push.
