= Channel 29 TV stations in Mexico =

The following television stations broadcast on digital channel 29 in Mexico:

- XEPM-TDT in Ciudad Juárez, Chihuahua
- XEZ-TDT in Querétaro, Querétaro de Arteaga
- XHBN-TDT in Oaxaca, Oaxaca
- XHCDT-TDT in Ciudad Victoria, Tamaulipas
- XHCQR-TDT in Chetumal, Quintana Roo
- XHCTCH-TDT in Chihuahua, Chihuahua
- XHCTMX-TDT in Mexico City
- XHCTTH-TDT in Tapachula, Chiapas
- XHG-TDT in Guadalajara, Jalisco
- XHGE-TDT in Campeche, Campeche
- XHGUY-TDT in Guaymas, Sonora
- XHHDL-TDT in Huajuapan de León, Oaxaca
- XHHMS-TDT in Hermosillo, Sonora
- XHLAM-TDT in Lázaro Cárdenas, Michoacán de Ocampo
- XHLAR-TDT in Nuevo Laredo, Tamaulipas
- XHLGA-TDT in Aguascalientes, Aguascalientes
- XHLMI-TDT in Los Mochis, Michoacán
- XHLPB-TDT in La Paz, Baja California Sur
- XHMAC-TDT in Ciudad Madera, Chihuahua
- XHMLC-TDT in Monclova, Coahuila de Zaragoza
- XHMOW-TDT in Morelia, Michoacán de Ocampo
- XHMTDU-TDT in Durango, Durango
- XHMTS-TDT in Matehuala, San Luis Potosí
- XHNOH-TDT in Nueva Rosita, Coahuila de Zaragoza
- XHOPMS-TDT in Mazatlán, Sinaloa
- XHP-TDT in Puebla, Puebla
- XHPEH-TDT in Escárcega, Campeche
- XHPFC-TDT in Parras de la Fuente, Coahuila de Zaragoza
- XHRBA-TDT in Río Bravo, Tamaulipas
- XHSLV-TDT in San Luis Potosí, San Luis Potosí
- XHSPQ-TDT in Cancún, Quintana Roo
- XHTAT-TDT in Tamazunchale, San Luis Potosí
- XHTCO-TDT in Tecomán, Colima
- XHTIT-TDT in Tijuana, Baja California
- XHTMBR-TDT in Veracruz, Veracruz
- XHTUA-TDT in Tuxtla Gutierrez, Chiapas
- XHTUX-TDT in Iguala, Guerrero
- XHVHT-TDT in Villahermosa, Tabasco
- XHWT-TDT in Tampico, Tamaulipas
- XHZMT-TDT in Zamora, Michoacán de Ocampo
- XHZOT-TDT in Mecayapan, Veracruz de Ignacio de la Llave
