= Channel 29 TV stations in Canada =

The following television stations broadcast on digital or analog channel 29 in Canada:

- CFCN-DT in Calgary, Alberta
- CFTF-DT in Rivière-du-Loup, Quebec
- CFTU-DT in Montreal, Quebec
- CHNM-DT-1 in Victoria, British Columbia
- CIFG-DT in Prince George, British Columbia
- CIII-DT-29 in Sarnia-Oil Springs, Ontario
- CKCW-DT in Moncton, New Brunswick
