= Canal 29 (Chinandega) =

Canal 29 was a television station in Chinandega, Nicaragua. In addition to its UHF signal, it was also broadcast on Claro TV channel 49. It was founded in 2005 by Jordanian-Nicaraguan businessman Haitham Naim Abu Shebab, who also owned Rey TV, a cable channel in León on channel 50 on Claro. Both were closed in January 2015 by TELCOR.

== History ==
Canal 29 received its license in November 2004 (as Haitham Chanel [sic]) and signed on on 8 April 2005 as the first local television station in Chinandega. In an initial phase, the station faced administrative difficulties, given that its owner had no prior experience in television, generating losses in its early months. Subsequently, the channel's administration was taken over by architect Oscar Oviedo. The programming was initially mostly undefined as it consisted largely of movies, music videos and cartoons.

In its first year, still under Shabib, its newscast Visión 29 began. Upon Oviedo's arrival, the line-up started to be properly defined. The channel almost faced closure due to a lack of staff, which Oviedo decided to counter by hiring more.

The channel shut down in January 2015. On 25 January, Shehab received a phone call from TELCOR informing of its closure. He told the regulator that he was far from its facilities, to which he told Oviedo. Shehab was the presenter of En Broma y En Serio, broadcast on Monday nights and repeated on Saturday nights, where, in recent editions, he criticized local authorities. Shehab appealed, but had no results.
