= XHJMA-TV =

Former television station in Hidalgo del Parral, Chihuahua, Mexico

Hidalgo del Parral, Chihuahua; Mexico
- Channels: Analog: 3 (VHF)

Programming
- Affiliations: TIM (1969–1972?)

Ownership
- Owner: José Manuel Acosta Castañeda

History
- First air date: 1969
- Last air date: March 25, 2014
- Call sign meaning: José Manuel Acosta Castañeda

XHJMA-TV was a television station in Hidalgo del Parral, Chihuahua, Mexico, broadcasting on channel 3 from 1969 until April 2014.

== History ==
After receiving its concession in September 1964, XHJMA took to the air sometime in 1969 as the first television station in Hidalgo del Parral. It was owned by José Manuel Acosta Castañeda (from whose name it took its call letters), and when Castañeda got involved in the creation of the Tele-Cadena Mexicana network, XHJMA became part of it and was one of its several stations affiliated with Televisión Independiente de México. It was the first commercial television station in Mexico to bear a five-letter callsign.

In 1975, the stations of Tele-Cadena Mexicana were expropriated by the Mexican government after TCM collapsed. The station allocations were put up for bidding, and in most areas Corporación Mexicana de Radio y Televisión or Tele-Radio Nacional, two state-owned enterprises, won the concessions and maintained the stations as repeaters of the Canal 13 network (today Azteca Trece). There were several major exceptions to this process, however; XHBL channel 13 Culiacán remained on the air for some time with unknown programming, XHST-TV in Mérida remained under SOMEX operation for years until the state government of Yucatán bought it in 1981, and José Manuel Acosta Castañeda maintained XHJMA, XHIA-TV channel 2 in Torreón and XHCG-TV channel 12 in Los Mochis. He made attempts to win television station concessions—including some of the ones he had lost, but he did not meet with success.

After the November 1975 notice that revoked Acosta Castañeda's stations, an official call for bids was put out in January 1977 for a new station on channel 3 in Parral, which would have held the callsign XHPAR-TV. However, this never happened, and by the late 1970s it was listed as being a Tele-Cadena Mexicana station outside of the Canal 13 network, operated with the help of SOMER (Sociedad Mexicana de Radio). This status only applied to XHJMA, XHIA and XHCG.

In the late 1990s, labor disputes led to the end of the Torreón and Los Mochis stations; neither channel would be restarted, and in Los Mochis a channel 11 was built in its stead as part of an expansion of Canal Once. The Parral station remained under increasingly local operation, as Castañeda brokered time on the station to Otho Valles Baca, who operated XEJS-AM 1150.

In July 2009, federal agents stormed the XEJS/XHJMA facilities and forced both stations off the air for most of the day. Later understanding that their seizure of the station was a mistake, Cofetel apologized and even offered to help the station rebuild.

However, XHJMA went off the air for good on March 25, 2014, when inspectors on behalf of the new Federal Telecommunications Institute visited Hidalgo del Parral, where they had received word that a channel 3 was operating without any concession or permit. On this visit, authorities yet again seized the station's equipment. XHJMA's staff noted that the station was completely unaware of its murky legal status, even though Castañeda had died in November 2009. A fine of 33,000 pesos was imposed on the station, which attempted to work with federal officials in Mexico City in a bid to put the station back on air.
