= Channel 15 TV stations in Canada =

The following television stations broadcast on digital or analog channel 15 in Canada:

- CFGC-DT-2 in North Bay, Ontario
- CFTO-TV-21 in Orillia, Ontario
- CFVS-DT in Val-d'Or, Quebec
- CHCH-DT in Hamilton, Ontario
- CIII-DT-12 in Sault Ste. Marie, Ontario
- CIVK-DT in Carleton, Quebec
- CIVQ-DT in Quebec City, Quebec
- CKMI-DT-1 in Montreal, Quebec
