= Milenio =

Mexican newspaper

- Type: Daily newspaper
- Format: Berliner
- Owner: Grupo Multimedios
- Editor: Carlos Marín
- Founded: 22 November 1974; 51 years ago (as El Diario de Monterrey); 1 January 2000; 26 years ago (as Milenio in Mexico City)
- Headquarters: Av. Eugenio Garza Sada 2245, Colonia Roma, Monterrey, Nuevo León
- ISSN: 1563-7549
- Website: www.milenio.com

Milenio is a major national newspaper in Mexico, owned by Grupo Multimedios. It was founded by Jesús Dionisio González González on 22 November 1974, as El Diario de Monterrey, in Monterrey, Nuevo León, which covered national and international news, local news, entertainment, and sports, across eight pages. In 1994, the newspaper started publishing the weekly magazine Milenio Semanal. In 1997, El Diario de Monterrey began a regional expansion in northern Mexico, covering Tampico, Tamaulipas, and Torreón, Coahuila, which led to its national expansion and its rebranding as Milenio ('Millennium') on 1 January 2000, the first day of the new millennium. Grupo Milenio also owns Milenio Televisión, the newspaper's 24-hour news channel, and Milenio Radio.

Milenio was criticized for publishing a poll 5 days before the 2012 Mexican general election, which gave Enrique Peña Nieto an 18-point lead over Andrés Manuel López Obrador, when in the actual election the difference was of 6.46 percent. Ciro Gómez Leyva, then-editorial director, printed a public apology, adding that the newspaper would retire from electoral polling. Journalists from the newspaper have received National Journalism Awards.
