= XHCMO-TDT =

Public TV station in Cuernavaca, Morelos, Mexico

Cuernavaca, Morelos; Mexico
- Channels: Digital: 19 (UHF); Virtual: 15

Ownership
- Owner: Gobierno del Estado de Morelos

History
- Founded: April 17, 1991
- Former channel numbers: 3 (analog and virtual, 1991-2016); 49 (branding, 2014-2016; digital physical, 2014-2018)
- Call sign meaning: "Cuernavaca, Morelos"

Technical information
- Licensing authority: CRT
- ERP: 40.3 kW
- Transmitter coordinates: 18°58′09″N 99°13′48″W

Links
- Website: rtvmorelos.mx

XHCMO-TDT is a television station in Cuernavaca, Morelos. Broadcasting on virtual channel 15, XHCMO is a public and educational television station owned and operated by the state of Morelos and managed by the Instituto Morelense de Radio y Televisión (IMRyT).

The station went on air on April 17, 1991, as XHCMO-TV, broadcasting on channel 3. This made it the first state-run television station in Morelos, under the auspices of what was then known as the Morelos System of Radio and Television (Sistema Morelense de Radio y Televisión or SMRTV, not to be confused with the similarly named Michoacán state network, the Sistema Michoacano de Radio y Televisión). After 1995, when SMRTV was dissolved, the quality of its radio and television stations began to fade. The Canal 3 transmitter weakened with lack of maintenance, while equipment became outdated. In 2000, the former SMRTV stations were reorganized, but for political reasons, the needed modernization of the radio and television stations did not happen. In 2010, SMRTV was reformed, and in 2013, it took on its current name of IMRyT.

In April 2014, XHCMO received approval to flash-cut to digital on channel 49 and increase its effective radiated power. The station shut off its analog signal on September 4, 2014, at which time it rebranded as Canal 49 (but continued to use virtual channel 3.1). XHCMO was assigned virtual channel 15 and moved to it on October 20, 2016, rebranding as "El Canal de Morelos".

In March 2018, in order to facilitate the repacking of TV services out of the 600 MHz band (channels 38-51), XHCMO was assigned channel 19 for continued digital operations.
