= CFTU-DT =

Television station in Montreal, Quebec, Canada

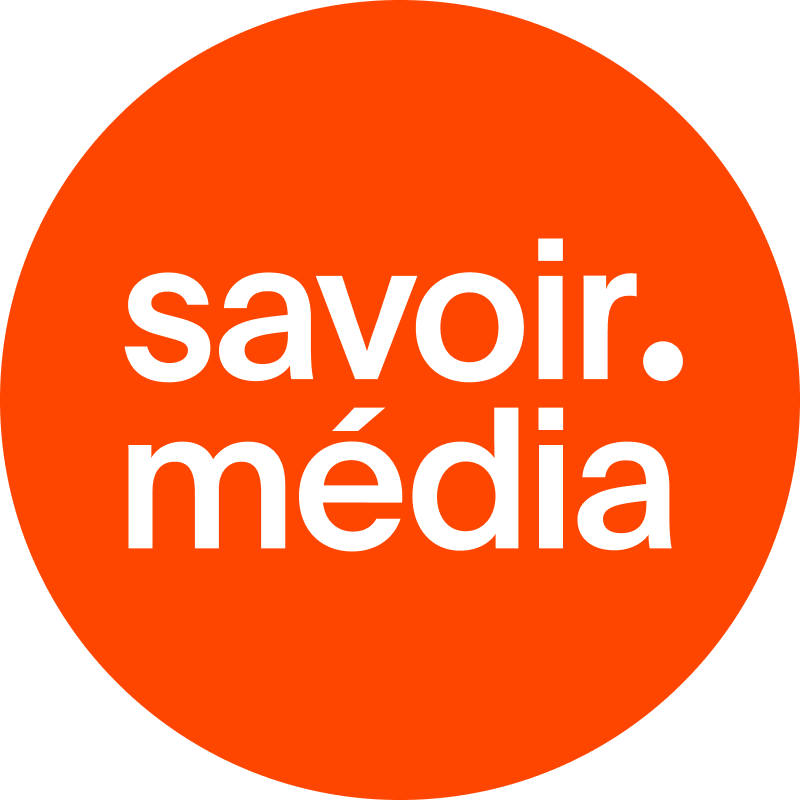
- Montreal, Quebec; Canada
- Channels: Digital: 29 (UHF); Virtual: 29
- Branding: savoir média

Programming
- Affiliations: 29.1: Educational Independent

Ownership
- Owner: Savoir média

History
- First air date: August 20, 1986
- Former call signs: CFTU-TV (1986–2012)
- Former channel numbers: Analog: 29 (UHF, 1986–2012)
- Call sign meaning: Télé-Université

Technical information
- Licensing authority: CRTC
- ERP: 450 W
- HAAT: 208.5 m (684 ft)
- Transmitter coordinates: 45°30′10″N 73°36′54″W

Links
- Website: savoir.media (in French)

CFTU-DT (channel 29), branded savoir média, is a French-language educational independent television station in Montreal, Quebec, Canada. The station is owned by Savoir Media, a private consortium consisting primarily of Quebec-based post-secondary institutions. CFTU-DT's studios are located on Rue Sainte-Catherine East and Rue Pathenais in Downtown Montreal, and its transmitter is located at Pavillon Roger-Gaudry on the campus of the Université de Montréal.

== History ==
CFTU's history traces back to 1981, when a distance learning organization known as Télé-Université (the "TU" in the station's callsign) negotiated with Vidéotron, the local cable provider in Montreal, to take responsibility for running an educational television service in the province. The following year, an agreement between Télé-Université and Vidéotron was reached, subsequently leading to the startup of a publicly accessible educational cable television service, using Radio-Québec as its over-the-air gateway for its programming.

Canal Savoir logo from September 8, 2009, to April 1, 2019

Savoir média logo from April 1, 2019, to July 3, 2023

In the next three years, 13 other educational institutions around Quebec, starting with the Université de Montréal, joined up with Télé-Université to provide administrative and technical support for the new television service. The institutions formed a new consortium, known as the Corporation pour l'Avancement des Nouvelles Applications des Langages (or "CANAL" for short), to co-ordinate the educational television service and prepare it to begin broadcasting over-the-air.

After over a year of test transmissions on channel 62, Télé-Université officially launched its over-the-air service, CFTU-TV on UHF channel 29, on August 20, 1986. On cable television in Montreal, it was carried on channel 26 on the West Island and 47 in the east, and was the first over-the-air television station in Canada to be given a cable assignment outside the basic band (channels 2–13) of the dial. CFTU launched under the brand name of "Canal de Télé-enseignement" (The Learning Channel), and later changed its branding to "Canal Savoir" in 1997 and then "Savoir média" in 2019.

== Technical information ==
=== Subchannel ===
Subchannel of CFTU-DT
Channel	Res.	Short name	Programming
29.1	720p		Main CFTU-DT programming

=== Analog-to-digital conversion ===
Although the analog television shutdown and digital conversion took place on August 31, 2011, CFTU-TV was granted a temporary extension for their analog broadcasts until October 31, 2011. This extension deadline could not be met, so a second extension was granted until December 15, 2011. When it too could not be met, a third extension until March 31, 2012, was granted.

CFTU finally turned off its analog signal and converted to digital on February 23, 2012, broadcasting on UHF channel 29, making it the last television station in Montreal to do so; however, it broadcast in standard-definition 480i until March 28, 2013, when it began broadcasting in high definition 720p.

The digital transition slightly improved CFTU's coverage in Montreal. For most of its history, it was plagued by a weak signal. Its analog signal broadcast at only 10,000 watts, roughly on the same level as low-power UHF stations in the United States. It was one of the weakest full-power stations in Canada and the second-weakest in Montreal. This effectively limited its over-the-air footprint to the Island of Montreal, Jésus Island, and a few inner-ring off-island suburbs. However, its signal was marginal at best even in Montreal. Although the station's digital signal broadcasts at 450 watts, it penetrates further into Montreal than its analog predecessor. However, it is not viewable in parts of downtown and southeast Montreal as its signal is blocked by Mount Royal, to the east of its transmitter at the Université de Montréal. It still relies on cable for the bulk of its viewership.

== See also ==
- Television of Quebec
- Culture of Quebec
