= XHDTV-TDT =

Television station in Tecate

- Tecate–Tijuana, Baja California; Mexico
- City: Tecate, Baja California
- Channels: Digital: 21 (UHF); Virtual: 49

Programming
- Affiliations: UPN (1999–2006); MyNetworkTV (2006–2018); MundoFox/MundoMax (49.2, 2012−2016); Azteca América (49.2, March−July 2017); Milenio Televisión (2018–2025)

Ownership
- Owner: Intermedia Telecomunicaciones, S.A. de C.V.

History
- First air date: November 1, 1999
- Former call signs: XHTEB-TV (1998–1999, never used on air); XHUPN-TV (1999–2006); XHDTV-TV (2006–2015)
- Former channel numbers: Analog: 49 (UHF, 1999–2015)
- Call sign meaning: High-definition television (on-air branding: possible disambiguation of former sister station XETV-TV; -or-; San Diego MyNetworkTV (former affiliation)

Technical information
- Licensing authority: CRT
- Facility ID: 7020147
- ERP: 300 kW
- HAAT: 834 m (2,736 ft)
- Transmitter coordinates: 32°18′49″N 116°39′53″W

XHDTV-TDT (channel 49) is a television station in Tecate, Baja California, Mexico, serving the Tijuana–San Diego international metropolitan area. The station is owned by Intermedia Telecomunicaciones, S.A. de C.V. XHDTV-TDT's transmitter is located on Cerro Bola, within the municipality of Tecate.

As it is licensed by the Mexican government, XHDTV is not covered under the Federal Communications Commission (FCC)'s must carry rules. This means that local cable providers in the San Diego market are not required to carry the station, even if it requests to be carried under this provision. However, the station must be carried by Mexican pay-TV providers in the Tijuana viewing area.

== History ==
=== UPN affiliation ===
The station first signed on the air on November 1, 1999, as XHUPN-TV, more than a year after Alco received its concession on July 2, 1998. Operated as an English-language commercial station since its debut (the second such Baja California-licensed station in the San Diego–Tijuana market to operate in this manner, after XETV (channel 6)), it originally served as the market's UPN affiliate, which brought that network's programming back to the market just over a year after charter affiliate KUSI-TV (channel 51) dropped UPN due to the network's low viewership locally and reverted to being an independent station in 1998. In the interim, UPN programming was brought in out-of-market from KCOP-TV, the network's owned-and-operated station in Los Angeles, on San Diego area cable providers. When XHUPN went on the air, the station asked those cable providers to drop KCOP from their lineups. Thereafter, XHUPN adopted the "UPN 13" moniker; while XHUPN was the station's official call sign as licensed by the Secretariat of Communications and Transportation (SCT), it used the fictional and abbreviated callsign "XUPN" on-air.

=== MyNetworkTV affiliation ===
Logo as "MyTV 13"

On January 24, 2006, Time Warner and CBS Corporation announced that they would shut down The WB and UPN. The two networks would then have some of their programming folded into a single service, The CW. On that same date, The CW signed KSWB-TV (channel 69) as the network's San Diego charter affiliate as part of a ten-year affiliation agreement between the network and KSWB owner Tribune Broadcasting's 14 WB-affiliated stations at the time. After the merger was announced, XHUPN was initially expected to become an affiliate of Spanish-language network Telefutura; however on March 18, 2006, it was announced that XHUPN would instead become a charter affiliate of MyNetworkTV, another upstart network created by the Fox Entertainment Group subsidiary of News Corporation (the Telefutura affiliation instead went to KDTF-LP (channel 36)).

The station dropped all UPN references on-air soon afterward and simply called itself "Channel 13" and later "TV 13" (this same practice of stations dropping UPN branding following the announcement of The CW's launch had become common on UPN affiliates owned by News Corporation's Fox Television Stations unit). It also received SCT approval on April 10, 2006, to change its call sign to XHDTV-TV. UPN programming on XHDTV ended on September 4, with the exception of WWE SmackDown, which aired on late Friday nights/early Saturday mornings after midnight for two weeks prior to The CW's launch. As a MyNetworkTV affiliate, the station branded as "XDTV MyTV 13", with "XDTV" serving as its new fictional and abbreviated callsign.

=== Milenio Television affiliation ===
In September 2018, XHDTV-TDT dropped MyNetworkTV and all American syndicated programming from the schedule and joined Milenio Televisión; MyNetworkTV's programming moved to a secondary clearance on the CW-affiliated second digital subchannel of KFMB-TV (channel 8), an increasingly common fate for the service. XHDTV was the final Mexican-licensed station carrying an English language schedule meant more for American audiences (following XETV-TDT's switch from The CW to Canal 5 in 2017); at the time of the switch, it was also the only English-language commercial television station in the San Diego–Tijuana market without any form of news, either produced in-house or from another market station. Grupo Cadena's XHBJ-TDT (channel 45) affiliated with Multimedios on November 1, 2019.

== Technical information ==
Subchannel of XHDTV-TDT
Subchannel	Res.	Short name	Programming
49.1	1080i	XHDTV	Silent

XHDTV-TV became a charter affiliate of MundoFox, which launched on August 13, 2012, on digital subchannel 49.2. The subchannel was removed early on December 1, 2016, upon the end of operations for the network (which changed its name to MundoMax in its last year).

XHDTV-TDT added a subchannel carrying Azteca América on March 15, 2017, replacing KZSD-LP as the network's San Diego affiliate (that station became a MeTV affiliate on May 1); the network then moved to sister station XHAS-TDT on July 1. 49.2 went dark and soon was removed again.

=== Analog-to-digital conversion ===
In the summer of 2011, XHDTV-TV began transmitting a digital signal on UHF channel 47; this signal remaps on ATSC digital tuners in both countries as virtual channel 49.1 (reflecting its analog channel allocation). While the United States completed its transition to full-power digital television on June 12, 2009, Mexico is making the transition to digital-only television broadcasts over the course of several years in order from the largest population centers to the smallest; the country's digital television transition expected to be completed by December 31, 2015. XHDTV was not required to shut down its analog signal on April 16, 2013, like other Tijuana stations, as it is licensed to Tecate; this switch took place on July 14, 2015, and was only accomplished after repeaters of several Tijuana stations were converted there.

In March 2018, in order to facilitate the repacking of TV services out of the 600 MHz band (channels 38–51), XHDTV was assigned channel 21 for continued digital operations.

== See also ==
- Channel 13 branded TV stations in the United States
