= XHVTU-TDT =

Multimedios Televisión station in Ciudad Victoria, Tamaulipas

- Ciudad Victoria, Tamaulipas; Mexico
- Channels: Digital: 25 (UHF); Virtual: 6
- Branding: Multimedios

Programming
- Affiliations: Multimedios Television

Ownership
- Owner: Grupo Multimedios
- Sister stations: XHLRS-FM

History
- Founded: 1991
- Former channel numbers: 50 (digital UHF); 7 (analog and digital virtual, to 2016); 12 (digital, 2016-2018)
- Call sign meaning: Ciudad Victoria, Tamaulipas

Technical information
- Licensing authority: CRT
- ERP: 20 kW
- HAAT: −222.4 m (−730 ft)
- Transmitter coordinates: 23°43′09.72″N 99°08′46.23″W

Links
- Website: Multimedios TV

XHVTU-TDT (virtual channel 6) is a Multimedios Televisión affiliate in Ciudad Victoria, Tamaulipas, Mexico. XHVTU broadcasts morning and night time local news program called Telediario de Ciudad Victoria, which airs from 8:00 AM – 9:00 AM CST and 8:00 PM – 9:00 PM CST. Throughout the whole day it also aires road / traffic conditions for the Ciudad Victoria region. This station also broadcasts local professional sports teams programming.

== History ==
XHVTU received its original concession on November 24, 1990. It was owned by Multimedios subsidiary Medios Electrónicos Mexicanos, S.A. de C.V. Originally intended to broadcast on channel 26 (later used for XHCVI-TV), it ended up on the more desirable VHF band as channel 7.

In 2010, XHVTU was assigned channel 50 for its digital channel. In 2015, anticipating repacking, this was changed to channel 25, with the action ratified by the IFT on April 29, 2016.

XHVTU has one digital repeater, at Gómez Farías, Tamaulipas.
