= XHFGL-TDT =

Television station in Durango City, Mexico

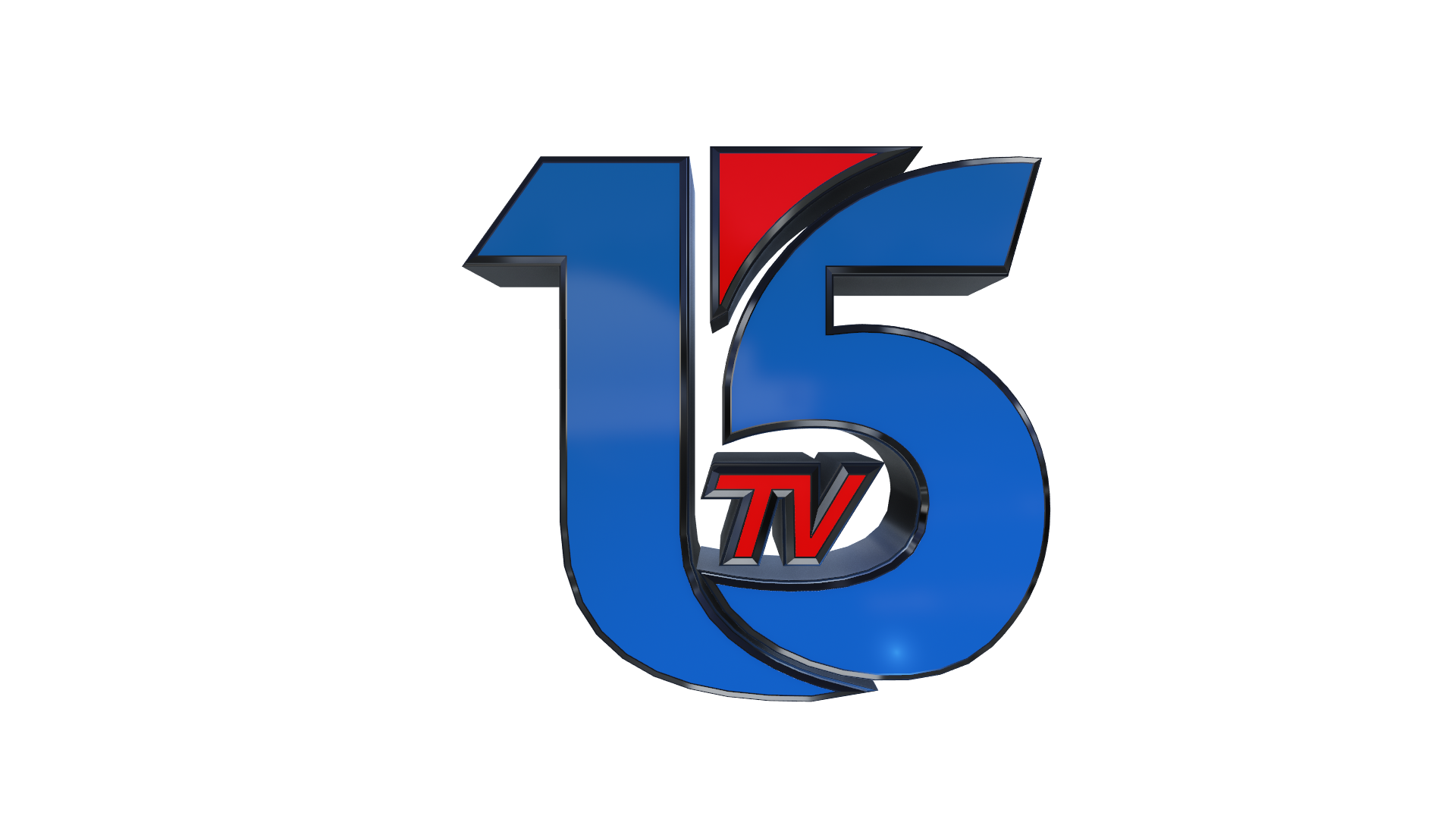
- Durango, Durango; Mexico
- Channels: Digital: 7 (VHF); Virtual: 15
- Branding: 15TV

Programming
- Affiliations: Independent (social)

Ownership
- Owner: Grupo Garza Limón; (Fundación Garza Limón, A.C.)
- Sister stations: XHDNG-FM, XHSRD-FM

History
- First air date: May 25, 2020
- Call sign meaning: Fundación Garza Limón

Technical information
- Licensing authority: CRT
- ERP: 32.280 kW
- HAAT: 131.1 m (430 ft)
- Transmitter coordinates: 24°03′05.1″N 104°51′03.5″W
- Translator(s): XHRCSP-TDT 22 (VC 15) Santiago Papasquiaro, 22.56 kW; Shadow XHRCSP-TDT Canatlán, 0.790 kW

Links
- Website: 15TV Live 15TV on Facebook 15TV on Instagram

XHFGL-TDT is a television station on virtual channel 15 (physical channel 7) in Victoria de Durango, Durango, Mexico. It is a social station owned and operated by the Fundación Garza Limón, A.C., associated with regional broadcaster Grupo Garza Limón, and is branded as Canal 15. The station's transmitter is located on Cerro El Tecolote.

A commercial subsidiary of Garza Limón, Radio Comunicación Gamar, S.A. de C.V., owns the station's repeater, XHRCSP-TDT, which broadcasts to Santiago Papasquiaro on physical channel 22.

== History ==
On March 9, 2009, the Fundación Garza Limón applied for a new permit television station to serve Durango. The request was not approved by the Federal Telecommunications Institute (IFT) until March 7, 2018. By that time, another subsidiary of Garza Limón had won two television station concessions in the IFT-6 auction, for stations in Santiago Papasquiaro and at Cuencamé.

On June 6, 2019, Garza Limón surrendered the Cuencamé station concession and a concession for a social FM radio station at Tepic, Nayarit, to the IFT.

On February 20, 2020, the XHFGL transmitter was activated, initially carrying Tremenda TV, a music video channel; XHRCSP soon followed. On May 25, the stations formally launched under the name 15tv (previous Canal 15) and began carrying news and other studio programming. The construction of a new antenna located within the city began in July 2021, on a property located on Cerro de los Remedios, and on September 20 was activated, providing a stronger and more stable digital signal to the city of Durango, Mex. It currently has up to 18 hours of content produced on a daily basis in their studios, with a variety of programs such as news, morning shows, interviews, entertainment and late-night shows with local hosts.

== Programming ==
- Noticieros Garza Limón - News from Durango with correspondents in different cities, it's the highest rating show with three daily live broadcasts
- La Lagaña Morning Show - Morning entertainment live show with special guests
- Pláticas de café - Interview show with guests of interest
- Como te la sabes - Contest show
- La Humilde Opinion - A talk show about the entertainment industry
- En Pelotas - Sport themed talk show
- La Baraja - Debate show with political guests
- Interrogatorio - Interview show with political guests
- Casualmente - Interview show about people with a remarkable career
- De Antemano - Weekly show about social issues
- Carrera al 22 - Limited show about upcoming elections in the state
- Aquí hay campo - Weekly show about farming and livestock issues with specialized guests
- La Pedacera - Late-night show with guests
- Hombres/Mujeres/Todos de Noche - Late-night show with every host of 15TV
