= XHMTCH-TDT =

Television station in Ciudad Juárez

- Ciudad Juárez, Chihuahua; Mexico
- Channels: Digital: 28 (UHF); Virtual: 6
- Branding: Canal 6

Programming
- Affiliations: 6.1: Canal 6; for others, see § Subchannels

Ownership
- Owner: Grupo Multimedios; (Multimedios Televisión, S.A. de C.V.)

History
- First air date: 2018
- Call sign meaning: Multimedios Televisión Chihuahua

Technical information
- Licensing authority: CRT
- ERP: 45 kW
- HAAT: 211.5 m (694 ft)
- Transmitter coordinates: 31°42′16″N 106°29′55″W

XHMTCH-TDT (channel 6) is a television station in Ciudad Juárez, Chihuahua, Mexico, affiliated with Canal 6. The station is owned by Grupo Multimedios.

== History ==
Multimedios Televisión had an off-and-on presence in the Ciudad Juárez market, primarily by way of El Paso low-power station K40FW (now K27OJ-D), which began broadcasting Multimedios in 2006 and converted to digital in July 2015.

On June 23, 2017, Cabada Holdings, LLC (formerly Broadcast Group, Ltd.) agreed to sell K26KJ-D's license to Martin Lorenzo Smith, Grupo Multimedios' international public relations and sales' director in the U.S. This made K26KJ-D the first television station owned and operated by an American employee of Grupo Multimedios. The deal was approved by the FCC on August 9, 2017, but consummation did not occur until March 7, 2018.

In July 2017, K26KJ-D began carrying a feed of XHABC-TDT, a local television station in Chihuahua City, on its third digital subchannel. This arrangement brought Canal 28, known as "ABC Televisión" in the Juárez area, to over-the-air viewers in Juárez for the first time, complementing XHABC's own transmitters in Chihuahua and Ciudad Cuauhtémoc. Canal 28 provides the feed to XHMTCH-TDT through its for-profit arm, Unidad Corporativa de Televisión, S.A. de C.V.

Multimedios Televisión bid for and won a television station in Ciudad Juárez as part of the IFT's IFT-6 television station auction in 2017. This station, XHMTCH-TDT RF 28 (virtual channel 6), came on the air in October 2018. It was quickly authorized to move to the Cerro del Indio transmitter site, sharing space with XHIJ-TDT and the Imagen Televisión transmitter for Juárez.

In November 2020, Multimedios replaced its main programming on K27OJ-D with Voz y Visión TV, a Spanish-language religious TV channel.

== Subchannels ==
Subchannel of XHMTCH-TDT
Channel	Res.	Short name	Programming
6.1	1080i	XHMTCH1	Canal 6
6.2	480i	XHMTCH2	Milenio Televisión
6.3	480i	XHMTCH3	CGTN Español
6.4	480i	XHMTCH4	Independent (XHABC-TDT)

Subchannel broadcast with MPEG-4 video
Broadcast on behalf of another station

The 6.2 and 6.3 channels are encoded in MPEG-4/H.264 video. Channel 6.4 is in MPEG-2.

On August 21, 2019, the IFT approved the substitution of shopping channel CV Shopping for Teleritmo on nine Multimedios stations, including XHMTCH, to January 2023.
