= XHCEP-TDT =

Television station in Celaya, Guanajuato, Mexico

Celaya, Guanajuato; Mexico
- City: Celaya, Guanajuato
- Channels: Digital: 19 (UHF); Virtual: 15
- Branding: Expresa TV

Ownership
- Owner: Octavio Arvizu Villegas (operated by TVR Comunicaciones); (Patronato de Televisión Cultural de Guanajuato, A.C.)

History
- Founded: November 14, 1988; December 11, 1991 (permit)
- First air date: November 14, 1988
- Former call signs: XHCEP-TV (1991–2016)
- Former channel numbers: 11 (analog, 1991–2016); 46 (digital, 2016–2018)
- Call sign meaning: XH CElaya Patronato

Technical information
- ERP: 200 W 500 W (digital)
- Transmitter coordinates: 20°31′06.74″N 100°49′48″W

Links
- Website: www.expresatv.com.mx

XHCEP-TDT is a television station on virtual channel 15 in Celaya, Guanajuato, Mexico. XHCEP is owned by a local television group, the Patronato de Televisión Cultural de Guanajuato, A.C.

== History ==
=== Getting on the air ===
The channel was founded by Octavio Arvizu Villegas on November 18, 1988, testing from a 10 watt transmitter in the “La Torre” Building, located at the intersection of Avenue Adolfo López Mateos and Mutualismo. Mario Muñoz Salinas was the first cameraman; others involved with the station included René Flores, Ofelia Ramírez, and Francisco Rico.

The testing phase ended one month later, on December 18. In January 1989, the station broadcast via closed circuit to several movie theaters to telecast the inauguration of mayor Javier Mendoza Márquez. On January 11, the Secretaría de Comunicaciones y Transportes received the documentation and official request to operate a television channel.

In September of the same year, President Carlos Salinas de Gortari visited Celaya, where Canal Once covered the event and utilized the president's appearance in their city to petition the government to resume broadcasting. Canal Once was able to return to the air for another year.

In August 1990, an incident forced Canal Once to leave the air. Government inspectors arrived in Celaya, with complaints of interference from Televisa León and its station, XHL-TV, then on channel 10. It was found that an unrelated group was broadcasting on channel 10 out of Celaya, which was causing interference to XHL. The equipment of the pirate channel 10 was confiscated, but Canal Once was forced to go off the air as well. A movement began to collect signatures urging the reactivation of the station.

In February 1991, a permit was awarded to give Canal Once channel 4 with 50 watts of power. However, this would have interfered with Televisa stations on channels 3 and 5 (transmitters of XEZ-TV and XHZ-TV on Cerro Culiacán). The government then decided to award channel 9. However, Canal Once, which had broadcast on channel 11 without issues, was able to petition the government to keep its channel 11 signal, and on December 11, 1991, the Patronato finally received permission to build and operate channel 11 in Celaya with the callsign XHCEP-TV. The station broadcast in analog with an effective radiated power of 200 watts, sufficient to cover Celaya without causing interference to XHL-TV in León or to Televisión Azteca's XHMAS-TV channel 12.

=== Digital transition ===
XHCEP was described as possibly not having sufficient resources to transition to digital television. In 2015, the station acquired the necessary resources, including a transmitter to broadcast on digital channel 46, and obtained authorization from the IFT to do so.

In the summer of 2016, tests and construction took place to launch XHCEP-TDT. In the lead-up to a major shuffle of virtual channels, the station was also assigned a virtual channel of 15; their analog number 11 was reserved nationwide for Canal Once.

The digital signal reaches localities including Santa Cruz de Juventino Rosas, Villagrán and San Juan de la Vega.

In March 2018, in order to facilitate the repacking of TV services out of the 600 MHz band (channels 38-51), XHCEP was assigned channel 19 for continued digital operations.

=== Change in operator ===
Operation of XHCEP-TDT changed hands in May 2018 to TVR Comunicaciones, owner of three commercial radio stations in Celaya. Under TVR's management, the station has been relaunched as Expresa TV.
