= XHAUC-TDT =

Television station in Chihuahua City

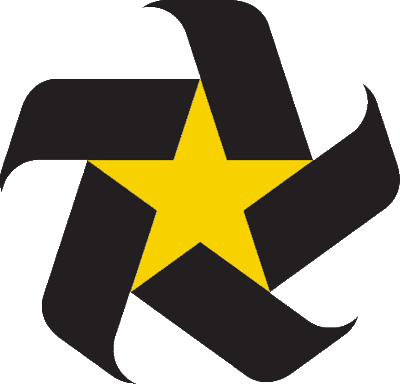
- Chihuahua, Chihuahua; Mexico
- Channels: Digital: 32 (UHF); Virtual: 6

Programming
- Affiliations: Multimedios Televisión

Ownership
- Owner: Grupo PARAM COM; (Telemisión, S.A. de C.V.)

History
- Founded: 1996
- Former channel numbers: 9 (analog and digital virtual, 1996–2019)
- Former affiliations: Gala TV/Nu9ve (1996–2018)
- Call sign meaning: "Chihuahua Chihuahua"

Technical information
- Licensing authority: CRT
- ERP: 45 kW
- HAAT: −4.9 m (−16 ft)
- Transmitter coordinates: 28°38′12.00″N 106°04′36.00″W

Links
- Website: grupoparam.com

XHAUC-TDT (channel 6) was a television station affiliated with Multimedios Televisión in Chihuahua, Chihuahua, Mexico. The concession for the station is held by Telemisión, S.A. de C.V., a business of José de Jesús Partida Villanueva. It is co-owned with XHTX-TDT in Tuxtla Gutiérrez, Chiapas. Partida Villanueva also built XEJPV-AM in Ciudad Juárez.

== History ==
XHAUC received its concession on November 15, 1991 but did not sign on until 1996. Telemisión's application beat out competing bids from eleven other applicants for the station.

Until 2018, Televisa supplied programs to XHAUC, which broadcast local programs and Nu9ve (formerly Gala TV) network programming. On January 1, 2019, all Televisa Chihuahua local programming moved to the second subchannel of 9.1 XHCHZ-TDT, leaving XHAUC without any programs, as a result of the disaffiliation of Telemisión from Televisa. After three weeks of carrying a slide showing the station's logo and transmitter, XHAUC began broadcasting Milenio Televisión on January 24.

XHAUC became a full-time Multimedios Televisión affiliate in May 2019. As a result, XHAUC was relocated to channel 6 in July 2019.

== Technical information ==
XHAUC-TDT broadcasts on RF channel 32 (virtual channel 6).

=== Subchannels ===
Channel	Res.	Short name	Programming
6.1	1080i	XHAUC	Multimedios Televisión
