= XHSDD-TDT =

TV station in Sabinas, Coahuila, Mexico

Sabinas, Coahuila; Mexico
- Channels: Digital: 21 (UHF); Virtual: 15
- Branding: 15tv

Programming
- Subchannels: 15.1 XHSDD; 15.2 XHSDD -2 hours
- Affiliations: Multimedios Televisión

Ownership
- Owner: Grupo Comunik, S.A. de C.V.

History
- First air date: July 24, 2000
- Former call signs: XHSDD-TV (2000-2016)
- Former channel numbers: 5 (analog and digital virtual, 2000-2016)

Technical information
- Licensing authority: CRT
- ERP: 20 kW
- Transmitter coordinates: 27°52′50″N 101°08′21″W

Links
- Website: 15tv.com.mx

XHSDD-TDT is a television station broadcasting on virtual channel 15 in Sabinas, Coahuila, Mexico. It is a local station carrying some programs from Multimedios Televisión.

== History ==
XHSDD began as channel 59, put out for bid in the 1990s and won by Televisora Alco, S.A. de C.V. The station moved to channel 5 before signing on July 24, 2000. XHSDD was sold to Melchor Sánchez Dovalina, an operator of radio stations in Monclova, in 2001, and to Telesistemas de Coahuila in 2006.

XHSDD shut off its analog signal on December 16, 2015, along with other stations in northern Coahuila. It relocated from virtual channel 5 to 15 in October 2016 in order to clear channel 5 for the Canal 5 network.

XHSDD has one digital translator, serving Allende and broadcasting with 250 watts.

== Subchannels ==
XHSDD carries a two-hour timeshift of the main 15.1 channel as subchannel 15.2. A previous third subchannel, "Mix TV", was closed in 2021.
