= XHENB-TDT =

Ensenada, Baja California, Mexico; Mexico
- Channels: Digital: 29 (UHF)

Programming
- Affiliations: defunct

Ownership
- Owner: Televisora Fronteriza, S.A. de C.V.

History
- Founded: October 1, 1994
- Last air date: 2018
- Call sign meaning: XH ENsenada Baja California

Technical information
- ERP: 6.15 kW
- Transmitter coordinates: 31°52′39″N 116°38′30″W

XHENB-TDT is a television station in Ensenada, Baja California. Broadcasting on channel 29, XHENB-TV is owned by Televisora Fronteriza, S.A. de C.V.

== History ==
XHENB signed on October 1, 1994, and from then until 1996 it operated locally. From 1996 to 2000, it was a repeater of the Galavisión network. It spent the next several years retransmitting various other networks, such as a combo of MVS newscasts with Antena 3 Internacional (2000–03); the religious La Familia Network (2003–04); Más Música music videos (2004–06); and PSN (2006–2023).

In 2011 the station was briefly off the air due to a rent dispute.

In December 2015, XHENB was among the last TV stations in the country to apply for and receive digital parameters. It applied for intermittent operation on channel 29 and moved its tower to a new site.

In 2023, this station is currently silent it is unknown if Canal 13 affiliated with Albavisión will take over XHENB-TDT.
