= XHST-TDT =

State-owned television station in Mérida, Yucatán

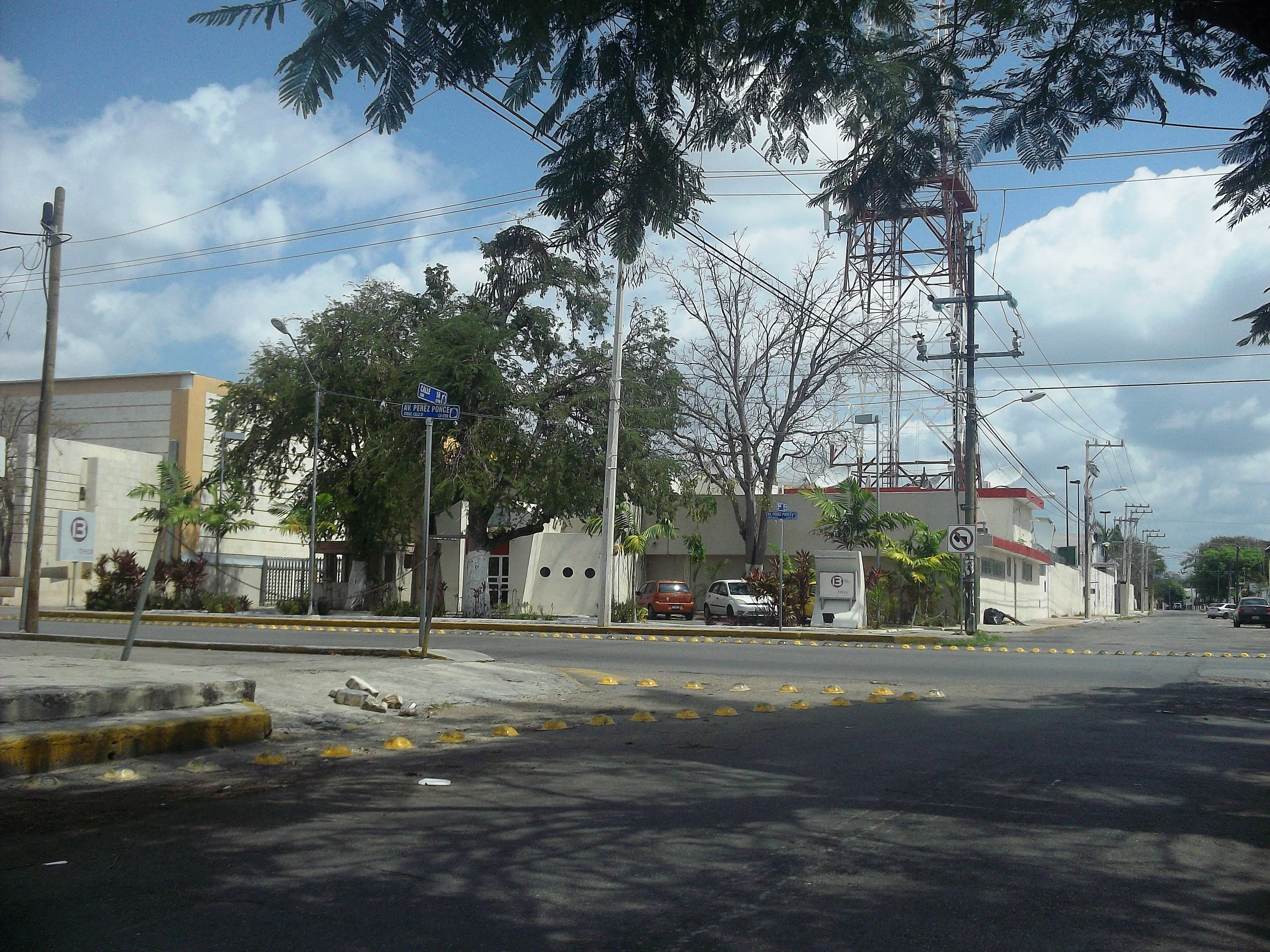
- Mérida, Yucatán; Mexico
- Channels: Digital: 28 (UHF); Virtual: 4
- Branding: Tele Yucatán

Ownership
- Owner: Gobierno del Estado de Yucatán; (Sistema Tele Yucatán, S.A. de C.V.)

History
- Founded: February 27, 1970
- Former call signs: XHST-TV (1970-2015)
- Former channel numbers: Analog: 13 (VHF, 1970-2015); Virtual: 13 (2015-2016)

Technical information
- Licensing authority: CRT

Links
- Website: www.teleyucatan.gob.mx

XHST-TDT, known as Tele Yucatán, is a television station on virtual channel 4 in Mérida, Yucatán. It is owned by Sistema Tele Yucatán, S.A. de C.V., a company wholly owned by the government of the State of Yucatán, with a schedule of primarily local programs including news, sports, culture and entertainment.

XHST is one of six state-owned television stations that are commercial concessions.

== History ==
Final Trecevisión logo used through December 2018, a modernization of a previous station logo from the 1980s

While channel 13 had periodically broadcast the Olympics in 1968, XHST-TV formally signed on February 27, 1970, transmitting a black-and-white signal. Luis Echeverría, who at the time was the PRI candidate for the presidency, was touring the state of Yucatán at the time and was invited to the new station's ribbon cutting ceremony. The station was owned by Tele-Cadena Mexicana, a business venture of Manuel Barbachano Ponce, and was its 13th station. However, the station's ambitious plans were crippled in 1974, when the federal government, acting on behalf of state financier SOMEX, seized its assets; in 1975, most other Tele-Cadena Mexicana stations were expropriated and added to the state-owned Canal 13 network from Mexico City. For the next seven years, SOMEX managed channel 13. The station broadcast five hours a day, six days a week, with little non-local programming. What local programs were produced were on a tight budget.

In 1981, XHST found its savior: the government of Yucatán, which bought the station from SOMEX and immediately set out to modernize and expand it. The station at last began color broadcasts, while it expanded its local programming.

In 2015, XHST received authorization to operate digital channel 28 at 100 kW. In December 2018, XHST ditched its Trecevisión name and became known as Tele Yucatán. The move came two years after the station changed from virtual channel 13 to 4 in October 2016.
