= Milenio Televisión =

Mexican cable news TV channel

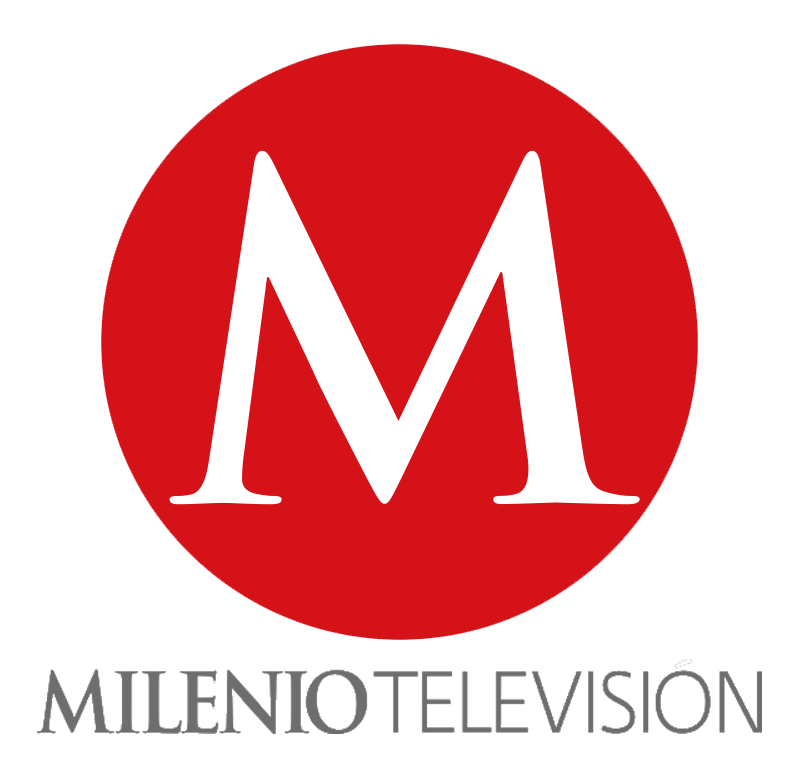
- Milenio Televisión
- Country: Mexico
- Broadcast area: Worldwide

Programming
- Language: Spanish
- Picture format: 1080i HDTV (downscaled to letterboxed or center cut 480i for the SDTV feed, depending on provider)

Ownership
- Owner: Grupo Multimedios

History
- Launched: August 20, 2008

Links
- Website: Milenio Television

Availability

Terrestrial
- Multimedios (Mexico): Channel 6.2
- XHILA-TDT (Mexicali, Baja California): Channel 66.4

Streaming media
- tv.milenio.com: Watch Live

Milenio Televisión is a Mexican television cable news channel owned by Grupo Multimedios. The news programming uses the resources of the Milenio newspaper, one of the largest in the country. Programming is 24 hours a day, through news, analysis and specialized programs. The channel is available in various pay TV systems throughout Mexico and the US, and on the internet. Milenio has also been available on the second digital subchannels of Multimedios television stations, as well as those of XHIJ-TDT and XHILA-TDT.

The network produced newscasts specifically for Los Angeles called Noticias 22 Milenio. The newscasts aired weekdays from 11 a.m. to 12 p.m., weekends from 4 to 5 p.m., daily from 7 to 8 p.m. and daily from 10 to 11 p.m. (Pacific Time) on KWHY-TV 22.

During 2012, Milenio Television began broadcasting on Digital Television on 12.2 of XHAW-TDT; until 2015 it moved to 12.2 of XHSAW-TDT. In 2017, it changes to channel 13.2. In February 2018, due to the change of XHAW-TDT from 12.1 to 6.1, XHSAW-TDT returns to 12.1 and Milenio Television in 12.2.

In 2016, Milenio Televisión's open signal increased when it received authorization from the IFT to be transmitted as part of the multiprogramming of the main channel in the cities of: Torreón, León, Nuevo Laredo, Ciudad Victoria, Tampico and Matamoros.

As a result of the IFT-6 tender, Multimedia won frequencies in Mexico City, Guadalajara, Durango, Ciudad Juarez and Monclova, Milenio Televisión is available at stations in those cities.

RF	VC	Call sign	Location	ERP	Concessionaire
25	6.2	XHAW-TDT	Monterrey, N.L. Saltillo, Coah.	120 kW; 37.5 kW	Televisión Digital
25	6.2	XHVTU-TDT	Ciudad Victoria, Tamps	20 kW	Multimedios Televisión
15	6.2	XHVTV-TDT	Matamoros, Tamps. Reynosa, Tamps.	15 kW; 40 kW	Televisión Digital
32	6.2	XHNAT-TDT	Nuevo Laredo, Tamps	54.34 kW	Multimedios Televisión
14	6.2	XHTAO-TDT	Tampico, Tamps	12.5 kW	Multimedios Televisión
23	6.2	XHOAH-TDT	Torreón, Coahuila	47.5 kW	Multimedios Televisión
31	6.2	XHLGG-TDT	León, Guanajuato	70 kW	Multimedios Televisión
28	6.2	XHMTCH-TDT	Ciudad Juárez, Chihuahua	45 kW	Multimedios Televisión
29	6.2	XHMTDU-TDT	Durango, Durango	75 kW	Multimedios Televisión
27	6.2	XHTDMX-TDT	Mexico City	170 kW	Televisión Digital
34	6.2	XHTDJA-TDT	Guadalajara, Jalisco	200.009 kW	Televisión Digital
21	49.1	XHDTV-TDT	Tecate, Baja California	300 kW	Televisora Alco, S. de R.L. de C.V
20	66.4	XHILA-TDT	Mexicali, Baja California	107.49 kW	Intermedia y Asociados Mexicali, S.A. de C.V.
33	6.2	XHMTCO-TDT	Monclova, Coahuila	45.052 kW	Multimedios Televisión
15	6.2	XHMTPU-TDT	Puebla, Puebla	300 kW	Multimedios Televisión
