= XHABC-TDT =

TV station in Chihuahua, Chihuahua, Mexico

- Chihuahua, Chihuahua; Mexico
- Channels: Digital: 34 (UHF); Virtual: 28
- Branding: Canal 28

Programming
- Affiliations: Independent

Ownership
- Owner: Sistema Chihuahuense de Televisión, A.C.; (Sistema Regional de Televisión, A.C.)

History
- Founded: June 16, 2004 (permit)

Technical information
- Licensing authority: CRT
- ERP: 21.5 kW
- HAAT: −134.2 m (−440 ft)
- Transmitter coordinates: 28°38′52.80″N 106°03′49.90″W

Links
- Website: canal28.tv

XHABC-TDT is a television station in Chihuahua, Chihuahua. Owned by the Sistema Chihuahuense de Televisión (permitholder Sistema Regional de Televisión, A.C.), it is a non-commercial station founded by Sergio Valles.

XHABC has a satellite station in Ciudad Cuauhtémoc, Chihuahua, XHCTH-TDT, which broadcasts on channel 33 and uses virtual channel 28.

In October 2016, XHABC began broadcasting full-time in digital on physical channel 34.

== Programming ==
XHABC produces several local programs, such as Encuentro, Yo Pregunto... and Jóvenes por Siempre. It also produces an hour-long local newscast on weeknights, titled ABC Noticias.

It also broadcasting programming from Televisión Educativa (the México Al Día morning newscast), cultural programs from Canal 22 through the day and on weekends, news programs from Deutsche Welle and RT, and Catholic shows from EWTN for an hour each day and on Sunday mornings.
