= Grupo Multimedios =

Mexican media conglomerate

Grupo Multimedios S.A. de C.V.
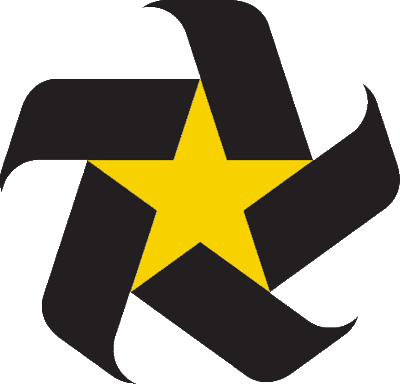
- Trade name: Grupo Firmas Globales S.A. de C.V.
- Formerly: Organizacion Estrellas de Oro SA de CV (1933-1988); Multimedios Estrellas de Oro SA de CV (1988-2015)
- Type: Sociedad Anónima de Capital Variable
- Industry: Mass media
- Founded: 1933; 93 years ago
- Founder: Jesús Dionisio González González
- Headquarters: Monterrey, Mexico
- Key people: Francisco Antonio González Sánchez
- Products: Television broadcasting, radio and multimedia
- Number of employees: ▲9,567
- Subsidiaries: Multimedios Radio; Multimedios Televisión; Milenio Diario
- Website: Grupo Multimedios; Grupo Firmas Globales

Grupo Firmas Globales (Legally registered as Grupo Multimedios S.A. de C.V.) is a Mexican media conglomerate with holdings in broadcast television, radio, publishing and entertainment.

The company is headquartered in Monterrey.

== History ==
Multimedios was founded in 1940 when Jesús Dionisio González acquired Monterrey radio station XEX, where he had formerly worked, for 12,500 pesos. After World War II, the Mexican government requested the XEX callsign to build a national clear-channel station, and González selected the XEAW call letters, which had formerly belonged to a station in Reynosa, Tamaulipas. In the 1950s, the group became known as Organización Estrellas de Oro ("Gold Stars Organization"), which in the 1990s changed its name to Multimedios Estrellas de Oro and later Grupo Multimedios.

Multimedios entered the television business in 1968 when it launched XHAW-TV channel 12 in Monterrey. Further expansion would come in the 1980s and 1990s when the federal government made available dozens of new radio and TV stations, leading to Multimedios establishing a broadcast presence in cities including Tijuana, Chihuahua, and Tampico.

== Media holdings ==
=== Radio ===
Multimedios owns 37 radio stations and operates another five. The station portfolio is primarily concentrated in northeastern Mexico, including 14 stations in Monterrey; through a combination of acquisitions, operating agreements and stations won in the IFT-4 auction of 2017, Multimedios has increased its presence in the state of Veracruz and in western and central Mexico. In addition, Multimedios owns three radio stations in Costa Rica, which it acquired in 2018 in its purchase of Grupo Latino de Radiodifusión from PRISA and Grupo Nación, and Top Radio 97.2 in Madrid.

=== Broadcast television ===
Multimedios entered the television business in 1968 when it launched XHAW-TV channel 12 in Monterrey. In the 1980s and 1990s, the television network expanded to a regional footprint centered on the states of Coahuila, Nuevo León and Tamaulipas. In the IFT-6 station auction of 2017, Multimedios obtained six additional concessions for television stations in Mexico City, Guadalajara, Puebla, Ciudad Juárez, Durango and Monclova, representing a major expansion into central Mexico.

On July 29, 2017, Multimedios launched a separate television channel in Costa Rica, on channel 44, through a licensing agreement with the Fundación Internacional de las Américas.

Additionally, Multimedios owns cable news channel Milenio Televisión, which shares resources with its Milenio newspaper.

=== Print ===
Jesús Dionisio González started the Diario de Monterrey newspaper in 1974. On January 1, 2000, the newspaper began publishing in Mexico City and became a national daily, renamed Milenio (Millennium). The company also publishes several magazines.

=== Out-of-home advertising ===
Grupo Pol is an out-of-home advertising company with a presence in Mexico and other Central American countries.

== Sports ==
Multimedios entered the sports ownership realm with its acquisition of 50 percent of the Sultanes de Monterrey baseball team in February 2017, with the other half held by Mexican baseball legend José Maiz García. The company grew further in sports in 2018 by buying the Fuerza Regia of the Liga Nacional de Baloncesto Profesional as well as four LNBP expansion franchises and by becoming a majority shareholder of the Bravos de León baseball team, a move that allowed the club to play in 2019. They have sold the team since.

== Other holdings ==
Other Multimedios holdings include real estate company Altea Desarrollos; three Spanish wineries, Lleiroso, Bodega de Sarría and Inversiones Vitivinícolas, with a combined output of 7.5 million bottles of wine a year; the Bosque Mágico (Magic Forest) amusement park in Monterrey;

In 2015, Comercializadora Jubileo, a Multimedios subsidiary previously dedicated to the creation of toys for amusement parks, obtained a contract with the state government worth 538 million pesos to build a water treatment plant. A new state government rescinded the contract in 2016. The Nuevo León Attorney General's Office later claimed that Jubileo had been awarded the contract despite its lack of prior experience in water treatment and failure to meet bid requirements.

== Former holdings ==
=== Cable television ===
Multimedios previously owned 50 percent of Televisión Internacional, S.A. de C.V., which traded as Cablevisión Monterrey. Cablevisión provided cable and internet service to the Monterrey metropolitan area. In 2016, Multimedios sold its stake to the other 50-percent owner, Televisa, and Cablevisión Monterrey was subsumed into Izzi Telecom.

=== Movie theaters ===
The MMCinemas chain of movie theaters, founded in 1981, was sold off in 2006 and then sold in 2008 to Grupo México, which rebranded all of its units as Cinemex.
