= Canal 6 (Mexico) =

Mexican television network

- Country: Mexico
- Broadcast area: Northeast & North-Central Mexico and Greater Mexico City; Nationwide (cable and satellite)
- Transmitters: see below
- Headquarters: Monterrey, Nuevo León, Mexico

Programming
- Language: Spanish
- Picture format: 1080i HDTV

Ownership
- Owner: Grupo Multimedios
- Key people: Francisco González

History
- Launched: February 24, 1968; 58 years ago
- Former names: Canal 12 (1968-2003); Multimedios Televisión (2003-2018)

Links
- Website: www.multimediostv.com

Availability

Terrestrial
- Digital terrestrial television (Mexico): Channel 6 (most of Mexico)

Canal 6 (alternately known and more well known as Multimedios Televisión) is a network of Spanish language television stations primarily concentrated in northeastern Mexico. The system is part of Grupo Multimedios. The flagship station of Multimedios is XHAW-TDT located in Monterrey, Nuevo León. Programming features locally produced news, sports, children's shows and general mass appeal variety programming. On weekdays, the network produces around twenty hours of live daily programming, with lesser amounts during the weekends and holidays.

Throughout its broadcast week, the network produces 58 hours of news programming per week under the branding of Telediario, including a Sunday night public affairs program, Cambios. It also produces pre-game, post-game and other programming involving Monterrey's two major soccer clubs, Tigres UANL and C.F. Monterrey, and through Groupo Multimedios' half-ownership of the team as of February 2017, a media partnership with the Mexican League's Sultanes de Monterrey in baseball, including weekend home game coverage. The network also carries the home matches of Chivas over-the-air exclusively in Guadalajara, Monterrey and Torreón.

The company also has network affiliates in many cities, some of which produce local content. The networks spans Northeast and North-Central Mexico, along with the Southwestern United States through over-the-air availability, but is also available nationally in both countries via cable, satellite and IPTV services. As of May 2016, all of the network's programming is presented in a 16:9 widescreen optimized form in both standard and high definition.

== History ==
Multimedios was founded in 1933 when Jesús Dionisio González acquired Monterrey radio station XEX, where he had formerly worked, for 12,500 pesos. In the 1950s, the group became known as Organización Estrellas de Oro (Gold Stars Organization), and entered the television business on 31 October 1964, when it received a television allocation in Monterrey, which later started on 24 February 1968 when it launched Canal 12 (Channel 12, XHAW-TV) in Monterrey.

Channel 12 gave birth to iconic shows in the city of Monterrey, such as Telediario hosted for more than five decades by Héctor Benavides and Fútbol al día, hosted by Roberto Hernández Jr.

Further expansion would come in the 1980s and 1990s when the federal government licensed new television stations, leading to Multimedios establishing a broadcast presence in cities such as Tijuana, Chihuahua, and Tampico.

== Multimedios affiliates ==
=== Mexico ===
Multimedios owns and operates most of its Mexican stations by way of two concessionaires, Multimedios Televisión and Televisión Digital. After operating in Monterrey alone for more than 20 years over XHAW-TV, Multimedios began its expansion in earnest in the late 1980s and early 1990s, building a rebroadcaster in Saltillo and new stations in northeast Mexico and in León, Guanajuato. It further increased its broadcast reach with affiliate stations in the northeast. In the Monterrey area, Multimedios also owns and operates a second TV station, XHSAW-TDT.

Multimedios participated in the IFT-6 television auction of 2017 and won six stations, including transmitters in Mexico City, Guadalajara and Puebla. The Mexico City station began broadcasting Milenio TV and Teleritmo on July 4, 2018. XHMTCO-TDT in Monclova, Coahuila, signed on July 7, 2018, and XHMTDU-TDT in Durango entered program service on August 6. XHTDMX-TDT began limited program service on August 14, 2018, and began a full schedule of programming originating from both Monterrey and Mexico City beginning August 27. The transmitter for XHTDJA was turned on September 13. However, it would be nearly another year before the last IFT-6 station went on the air, with the Puebla transmitter announced for an August 26, 2019 start-up date.

In 2019, two stations in the state of Chihuahua became Multimedios affiliates, XHAUC-TDT in Chihuahua and XHMH-TDT in Hidalgo del Parral.

RF	VC	Call sign	Location	Network/name	ERP	Concessionaire
25	6	XHAW-TDT	Monterrey, NL. Guadalupe (RF 26); Saltillo, Coah.	Multimedios Televisión (Multimedios 5)	120 kW; 19 kW; 37.5 kW	Televisión Digital
23	6	XHOAH-TDT	Torreón, Coah.	Multimedios Televisión (Milenio Televisión, Teleritmo)	47.5 kW	Multimedios Televisión
33	12	XHPNW-TDT	Piedras Negras, Coah.	Independent/Multimedios (XHPNW -2 hours)	15 kW	XHFJS-TV
21	15	XHSDD-TDT	Sabinas, Coah.	Independent/Multimedios (Canal 15 Sabinas -2 hours, Mix TV)	20 kW	Telesistemas de Coahuila
25	6	XHVTU-TDT	Ciudad Victoria, Tamps.	Multimedios Televisión (Milenio Televisión, Teleritmo, MVStv)	20 kW	Multimedios Televisión
15	6	XHVTV-TDT	Matamoros; Reynosa, Tamps.	Multimedios Televisión (Milenio Televisión, Teleritmo, MVStv)	35 kW; 40 kW	Televisión Digital
32	6	XHNAT-TDT	Nuevo Laredo, Tamps.	Multimedios Televisión (Milenio Televisión, Teleritmo, MVStv)	54.34 kW	Multimedios Televisión
31	6	XHLGG-TDT	Cerro Los Tenamastes, Jal. León	Multimedios Televisión (Milenio Televisión, Teleritmo)	47.5 kW; 70 kW	Multimedios Televisión
14	6	XHTAO-TDT	Tampico, Tamps.	Multimedios Televisión (Milenio Televisión, Teleritmo, MVStv)	12.5 kW	Multimedios Televisión
33	6	XHMTCO-TDT	Monclova, Coah.	Multimedios Televisión	45.052 kW	Multimedios Televisión
28	6	XHMTCH-TDT	Ciudad Juárez, Chih.	Multimedios Televisión (Milenio Televisión, Teleritmo, ABC Televisión)	45 kW	Multimedios Televisión
29	6	XHMTDU-TDT	Durango, Dgo.	Multimedios Televisión (Milenio Televisión, Teleritmo)	75 kW	Multimedios Televisión
15	6	XHMTPU-TDT	Puebla, Pue.	Multimedios Televisión	122.5 kW	Multimedios Televisión
27	6	XHTDMX-TDT	Mexico City	Multimedios Televisión (Milenio Televisión, Teleritmo, MVStv)	170 kW	Televisión Digital
34	6	XHTDJA-TDT	Guadalajara, Jal.	Multimedios Televisión (Milenio Televisión, Teleritmo, MVStv)	200.009 kW	Televisión Digital
32	6	XHAUC-TDT	Chihuahua, Chih.	Multimedios Televisión	45 kW	Telemisión, S.A de C.V.
30	13	XHMH-TDT	Hidalgo del Parral	Multimedios Televisión	25 kW	Pedro Luis Fitzmaurice Meneses
26	6	XHNTV-TDT	Tepic, Nayarit	8NTV (Milenio Televisión, Milenio Televisión)	25 kW	Radio-Televisión Digital de Nayarit, S.A. de C.V.
33	8	XHLL-TDT	Villahermosa, Tabasco	Multimedios Televisión	12 kW	Televisión de Tabasco S.A.de C.V.
21	49	XHDTV-TDT	Tijuana, Baja California	Multimedios Televisión	75 kW	

The Multimedios network formerly used virtual channel 12 (XHAW's channel number from its 1968 launch), from the national standardization of virtual channels on October 27, 2016, until the change to 6 on February 24, 2018. This mapping was not exclusive throughout Mexico, as Hidalgo's state network Radio y Televisión de Hidalgo and six local stations elsewhere are also mapped to channel 12. On February 24, 2018 (timed to XHAW-TDT's 50th anniversary celebration of going on the air on that date), Multimedios changed the virtual channel of all of its owned and operated stations to channel 6. Towards the end of April 2018, Multimedios began to utilize a secondary black and yellow "6" logo to remind viewers of its new national channel position, with its trademark star logo (which was simplified and took a mirrored look from its former logo in mid-2015) was phased out by 2022, and the network took on the "Canal Seis" branding full-time.

In mid-March 2020, much of the network's daily live entertainment programming outside of news and sports programming and the newly launched Mexico City-based afternoon gossip program Chismorreo was temporarily and voluntarily suspended due to the nation's coronavirus pandemic, which included a network campaign encouraging viewers to stay home; much of the entertainment programming eventually returned, though with only a few in-studio hosts practicing proper social distancing who coordinate the rest of their casts appearing via videotelephony, and a number of programs temporarily changing their time slots to accommodate expanded news programming (a reality competition involving expectant parents competing for prizes, Todo por el parto, was completely suspended, with a compressed finale episode done via videotelephony). Several of the network's news anchors and reporters also chose appear from home via video conferencing and self-isolate.

The network is also available nationwide through providers such as SKY México/VeTV and Izzi/Cablevisión.

=== United States and Canada ===
All American affiliates of the network are owned and operated by other broadcasters, due to FCC regulations regarding foreign ownership of radio and TV stations. The network leased stations from Mako Communications until early 2007.

The American version of the network feed features American direct response advertising and public service announcements laid over the main Monterrey feed, along with some programming substitutions (mainly Monterrey-specific local shows and paid programming for second runs of the network's main shows), along with KHLM-LD's Houston-focused public affairs program ¿Que Pasa Houston? on Sunday afternoons. The main Monterrey feed is available to Mexican viewers, streaming through the network's website and its iOS App Store and Google Play apps, with all network feeds blocked in the United States in deference to its American cable partners.

The network, along with Milenio Television, produces several outsourced newscasts for two stations in Los Angeles, California from Monterrey during studio downtime, both due to station cutbacks in their news departments. Independent station KWHY-TV began to air Multimedios-produced newscasts in 2017 after MundoMax ceased operations in December 2016, while Estrella TV's KRCA folded its news department outside several retained multimedia journalists beaming reports back to Monterrey at the start of March 2022.

As of late August 2018, the American network features mainly the XHAW-TDT schedule of entertainment programming from Monterrey, but the noon and primetime Telediario blocks are now split, with the first hour originating from XHTDMX-TDT's Mexico City broadcast, and the second hour being the Monterrey broadcast, with the morning newscast block switching in and out from both the Monterrey and Mexico City editions. Overnights feature a special American edition newscast from Milenio Television, along with that network's 10 p.m. newscast. As of September 2020, with the cancellation of the tween-focused variety show Acabatelo, Mexico City programming, including La Bola del Seis, Chismorreo, and Vivalavi, now predominates and airs live on the American feed. At the start of 2022, the original Monterrey-based version of Vivalavi airs in late night, with the Mexico City version airing live, along with C6 Alerta in early prime, which highlights current crime news. Prime programming from Monterrey (considered 9:30 p.m. local time) on weeknights now airs on an hour delay in the United States, though due to Mexico's suspension of Daylight Savings Time in 2023 and the American feed continuing to air programming live, the time it airs is actually two hours ahead in the United States from March until November.

The network is authorized to be carried as a foreign television service in Canada by that country's broadcasting authority, receiving that authorization on April 22, 2015; Milenio Television was also included in a separate application.

==== Pay TV availability ====
Multimedios is available across the United States on many cable, satellite and IPTV systems, including DirecTV, Dish/Sling, Comcast, Spectrum, AT&T U-Verse, Verizon FiOS and Grande Communications. It is carried in both standard definition and high definition versions. In 2016, the network also became available in Costa Rica (the third largest Mexican diaspora behind the United States and Guatemala) through cable (several of the network's personalities are Costa Rican-Mexicans); the American and Costa Rican feeds, along with the local "Plus" feed thus had a separate version of their morning lifestyle program, Vivalavi, known as Vivalavi Internacional with different hosts carried over them. Vivalavi Internacional was cancelled on January 11, 2017. Vivalavi began to feature segments from Monterrey and Mexico City in mid-August 2018, and the Thursday evening program SNSerio often has their hosts record the series in Mexico City to access a larger base for possible program guests than available in Monterrey.

In addition to this, the audio streams of Multimedios, Milenio TV and Multimedios' sports radio station XERG-AM are available via telephone through a both a Mexican and American telephone number for the regular costs of airtime depending on provider.

== Former Multimedios affiliates ==
Market/City of license	Station/Channel No. (DT)	Licensee	Additional Notes
Dallas/Fort Worth (Mesquite)	KATA-CD 50 (N/A)	Mako Communications	Station closed 2017
Las Vegas	KVPX-LD 28 (N/A)	Mako Communications	
Las Vegas (Laughlin)	KMCC 34.1 (32)	Beam Tilt, LLC	
Bakersfield	K18HD-D N/A (18)	Valley Public Television	VPT acquired station from Mintz Broadcasting in 2007; has since flash-cut to digital and currently rebroadcasts KVPT
Amarillo	K64GK 64 (N/A)	Mintz Broadcasting	
Corpus Christi	K20JT-D 54 (20)	Mintz Broadcasting	
Lubbock	K24GP 24 (N/A)	Mako Communications	
Midland	K69IT 69 (N/A)	Mintz Broadcasting	
San Angelo	K45HW 45 (N/A)	Mintz Broadcasting	
San Antonio	K17MJ-D 51 (17)	Mintz Broadcasting	
Tampa	WTAM-LD 28 (N/A)	Lotus Communications Corporation	Branded as TV Visión
Rio Grande City	KTLM 40.4	NBCUniversal	Had Milenio Televisión on 40.2. Was the only Telemundo O&O affiliated with either network. Both were dropped after NBCU bought KTLM.
