= List of radio stations in San Luis Potosí =

This is a list of radio stations in the Mexican state of San Luis Potosí, which can be sorted by their call signs, frequencies, location, ownership, names, and programming formats.

Radio stations in San Luis Potosí
Call sign	Frequency	Location	Owner	Name	Format
XEWA-AM (Note: Linked to XHEWA-FM, which must keep XEWA-AM on the air until there are no listeners in its service area unserved by other radio stations or the IFT orders it to cease to make way for a new station.)	540 AM	Soledad de Graciano Sánchez	Cadena Radiodifusora Mexicana, S.A. de C.V.	Los 40	Contemporary hit radio
XEPBSD-AM	620 AM	Soledad Diez Gutiérrez	Radio de Ayuda, A.C.	Súper Stereo Miled	News/talk, Spanish oldies
XESLEP-AM	710 AM	San Luis Potosí	Escápate al Paraíso, S.A. de C.V.	—N/a	—N/a
XEANT-AM	770 AM	Tancanhuitz de Santos	Instituto Nacional de los Pueblos Indígenas	La Voz de las Huastecas	Indigenous
XEBM-AM (Note: Combo with XHBM-FM 105.7)	820 AM	San Luis Potosí	Transmisiones Mik, S.A. de C.V.	La Ke Buena	Regional Mexican
XECSAK-AM	1150 AM	Matehuala	Radio Metro Misión Potosina, A.C.	—N/a	—N/a
XEXQ-AM	1190 AM	San Luis Potosí	Universidad Autónoma de San Luis Potosí	Radio Universidad	University radio
XECSAJ-AM	1280 AM	Tamazunchale	Radio Metro Misión Potosina, A.C.	—N/a	—N/a
XECSAC-AM	1340 AM	San Luis Potosí	Radio Metro Misión Potosina, A.C.	—N/a	—N/a
XHUSP-FM	88.5 FM	San Luis Potosí	Universidad Autónoma de San Luis Potosí	Radio Universidad	University radio
XHFF-FM	89.3 FM	Matehuala	Radio XHFF, S.A. de C.V.	La Norteña	Regional Mexican
XHSPS-FM	89.3 FM	San Luis Potosí	Asociación Patronal, Industrial, Comercial, Empresarial y Profesional, A.C.	Pasión por la Radio	Variety
XHCSCB-FM	89.7 FM	San Luis Potosí	Fundación Educacional de Medios, A.C.	—N/a	—N/a
XHSMR-FM	90.1 FM	Villa de Pozos	Transmisora Regional Radio Fórmula, S.A. de C.V.	Trión	Alternative rock
XHWZ-FM	90.9 FM	Soledad Diez Gutiérrez	XHWZ 90.9 MHz. F.M, S.A. de C.V.	La Mejor	Regional Mexican
XHCCBX-FM	91.1 FM	Salinas de Hidalgo	Carolina Calderón Badillo	—N/a	—N/a
XHCSDZ-FM	91.3 FM	San Luis Potosí	Julio César Espinoza Vargas	Atmosfera	Christian
XHIY-FM	91.7 FM	Rio Verde	José Luis Martínez Sánchez	SPKtacular	
XHSS-FM	91.9 FM	San Luis Potosí	XHSS-FM, S.A. de C.V.	La Poderosa	Regional Mexican
XHUASM-FM	91.9 FM	Matehuala	Universidad Autónoma de San Luis Potosí	Radio Universidad	University radio
XHCPED-FM	92.9 FM	Ciudad Valles	Sistema Público de Radiodifusión del Estado Mexicano	—N/a	—N/a
XHEI-FM	93.1 FM	Los Paisanos	XEEI-AM, S.A. de C.V.	Romántica	Romantic
XHPEAE-FM	93.3 FM	Ríoverde	Fundación de la Radio Cultural, A.C.	Espacio	Cultural
XHCCBV-FM	93.5 FM	Matehuala	Social Media Coahuila, S.A. de C.V.	—N/a	—N/a
XHRASA-FM	94.1 FM	San Luis Potosí	Multimedia de San Luis, S.A. de C.V.	Candela	Regional Mexican
XHEEM-FM	94.5 FM	Ríoverde	Informas Zona Media, S.A. de C.V.	La M Mexicana	Regional Mexican
XHPEAA-FM	94.7 FM	Ciudad Valles	José Melquiades Camacho Soria	Cielos Abiertos	Christian
XHNB-FM	95.3 FM	San Luis Potosí	Radio XHNB San Luis Potosí, S. de R.L. de C.V.	Amor	Romantic
XHCCBY-FM	95.7 FM	San Luis Potosí (Granjas de la Florida)	Radio Cañón, S.A. de C.V.	La Q	Spanish adult hits
XHOB-FM	96.1 FM	San Luis Potosí	Radiocomunicación Enfocada, S.A. de C.V.	Factor	
XHOD-FM	96.9 FM	San Luis Potosí	Transmisiones Mik, S.A. de C.V.	Vox	Spanish adult contemporary
XHWU-FM	96.9 FM	Matehuala	Radio XHWU, S.A. de C.V.	La Poderosa	Regional Mexican
XHCSCA-FM	97.3 FM	Ríoverde	Emmanuel Oyarvide Cano	Media Luna	
XHGI-FM	97.3 FM	Zacatipan	Reyna Irazabal y Hermanos, S.A. de C.V.	Radio Reyna	Regional Mexican
XHCSAK-FM	97.7 FM	Matehuala	Radio Metro Misión Potosina, A.C.	—N/a	—N/a
XHSNP-FM	97.7 FM	San Luis Potosí	Multimedios Radio, S.A. de C.V.	La Caliente	Regional Mexican
XHCSAI-FM	98.1 FM	San Luis Potosí	Radio Metro Misión Potosina, A.C.	—N/a	—N/a
XHCV-FM	98.1 FM	Ciudad Valles	René Castro Echeverría	La Gran Compañía	
XHQK-FM	98.5 FM	San Luis Potosí	Radio XHQK San Luis Potosí, S. de R.L. de C.V.	Mix	Regional Mexican
XHCSDY-FM	98.9 FM	Ciudad Valles	Ahora Contigo, A.C.	—N/a	—N/a
XHTL-FM	99.3 FM	San Luis Potosí	Estéreo San Luis, S.A. de C.V.	Más FM	
XHETR-FM	99.7 FM	Ciudad Valles	Publicidad Popular Potosina, S.A.	Voz 99.7	Talk
XHPM-FM	100.1 FM	San Luis Potosí	Radio Operadora Pegasso, S.A. de C.V.	W Radio	News/talk
XHXR-FM	100.5 FM	Ciudad Valles	Impulsora Radiofónica, S.A.	Radio Mensajera	
XHCSAH-FM	101.1 FM	Ríoverde	Radio Metro Misión Potosina, A.C.	—N/a	—N/a
XHAWD-FM	101.3 FM	San Luis Potosí	Fundación Nikola Tesla, A.C.	Magnética FM	
XHESL-FM	102.1 FM	San Luis Potosí	Radiocomunicación Enfocada, S.A. de C.V.	Exa FM	Contemporary hit radio
XHCCBW-FM	102.7 FM	Ríoverde	Comunicación Digital Zona Media, S.A. de C.V.	La Furia	Regional Mexican
XHCSBY-FM	102.9 FM	Ciudad Valles	Medios Digitales Culturales de la Huasteca, A.C.	Buenavista Radio	Cultural
XHEPO-FM	103.1 FM	San Luis Potosí	Cable Master, S.A. de C.V.	Imagen Radio	News/talk
XHCSGC-FM	103.5 FM	Maravillas	RYTSM, A.C.	—N/a	—N/a
XHIR-FM	103.7 FM	Ciudad Valles	Organización Radio Valles, S.A. de C.V.	Stereo Bit	
XHCSBZ-FM	103.9 FM	Matehuala	Álvaro Flores Juárez	—N/a	—N/a
XHEWA-FM	103.9 FM	Soledad de Graciano Sánchez	Cadena Radiodifusora Mexicana, S.A. de C.V.	Los 40	Contemporary hit radio
XHCZ-FM	104.9 FM	San Luis Potosí	Radio Informativa, S.A. de C.V.	La Lupe	Spanish adult hits
XHIE-FM	105.5 FM	Matehuala	Grupo Radiofónico del Altiplano Potosino, S.A. de C.V.	Oye	
XHBM-FM	105.7 FM	San Luis Potosí	Transmisiones Mik, S.A. de C.V.	La Ke Buena	Regional Mexican
XHCSM-FM	107.9 FM	San Luis Potosí	Fundación Cultural para la Sociedad Mexicana, A.C.	Radio María	Catholic
