= 88.5 FM =

FM radio frequency

The following radio stations broadcast on FM frequency 88.5 MHz:

== Argentina ==
- Amiga in Rosario, Santa Fe
- Ciudad 88.5 in Bella Vista, Corrientes
- Fiesta 88.5 in 9 de Julio, Buenos Aires
- FM Capital in Neuquén
- FM Municipal in El Calafate, Santa Cruz
- LRI716 Patria in Recreo, Santa Fe
- LRS945 Uno in Chabás, Santa Fe
- Nueva Argentina in Ituzaingo, Buenos Aires
- Radio María in Buenos Aires
- Radio María in Santa Elena, Entre Ríos
- Radio Pública in Mercedes, Buenos Aires

== Australia ==
- 2RRR in Sydney
- ABC Classic in Gold Coast, Queensland
- Radio VCA 88.5fm in City of Swan, Western Australia

== Canada (Channel 203) ==
- CBAF-FM in Moncton, New Brunswick
- CBME-FM in Montreal, Quebec
- CBRO-FM in Christina Lake, British Columbia
- CBU-1-FM in Abbotsford, British Columbia
- CBVG-FM in Gaspe, Quebec
- CFIR-FM in Morley, Alberta
- CIBH-FM in Parksville, British Columbia
- CILV-FM in Ottawa, Ontario
- CIVL-FM in Abbotsford, British Columbia
- CJSR-FM in Edmonton, Alberta
- CKDX-FM in Newmarket, Ontario
- CKYL-FM-3 in Fairview, Alberta
- VF2074 in Burgeo, Newfoundland and Labrador
- VF2348 in Kattiniq, Quebec
- VF2384 in St. Norbert, Manitoba
- VF2506 in Fort St. James, British Columbia
- VF8005 in La Patrie, Quebec

== China ==
- CNR Music Radio in Chifeng
- CNR The Voice of China in Zhangjiajie
- CRI Hit FM in Guangzhou

== Guatemala (Channel 2) ==
- TGRN-FM at Flores
- TGSG Galaxia La Picosa

== Indonesia ==
- RRI Programa 3 in Bandung, West Java

== Israel ==
- Kan 88 in Beersheba, Eilat and Haifa

== Jamaica ==
- TBC Radio in Kingston

== Malaysia ==
- Nasional FM in Kuala Lumpur and Labuan
- Suria in Malacca and Northern Johor

== Mexico ==
- XHAFQ-FM in Cosoleacaque, Veracruz
- XHCM-FM in Cuernavaca, Morelos
- XHCN-FM in Irapuato, Guanajuato
- XHCRS-FM in San Luis Río Colorado, Sonora
- XHDI-FM in Chihuahua, Chihuahua
- XHFW-FM in Tampico, Tamaulipas
- XHIL-FM in Veracruz, Veracruz
- XHKT-FM in Tecate, Baja California
- XHKV-FM in Villahermosa, Tabasco
- XHPLEO-FM in Huajuapan de León, Oaxaca
- XHRRF-FM in Mérida (Conkal), Yucatán
- XHUSP-FM in San Luis Potosí, San Luis Potosí
- XHWAG-FM in Monterrey, Nuevo León
- XHZUM-FM in Zumpango, Estado de México

== Palau ==
- T8BZ-FM at Koror

== Philippines ==
- Music Radio in Goa, Camarines Sur
- DWND in Cauayan City
- DWLN in Baler, Aurora
- DYCF in Malay, Aklan
- DYNB in Sibalom, Antique
- DYNC in Pandan, Antique
- DYPC in Calbayog City
- DYBD-FM in Toledo City
- Lifenzymes FM in Dumaguete City
- DXRJ-FM in Cagayan de Oro
- DXBZ-FM in Nabunturan
- DXNZ-FM in Mati City
- DXED in Malita, Davao Occidental

== United Kingdom ==
- BBC Radio 2 in Barnstaple, Blaenavon, Bradford, Cwmafan, Firth of Clyde, Isle of Wight, Skye & Lochalsh, South Devon, Tyne and Wear

== United States (Channel 203) ==
- KAIK (FM) in Rockaway Beach, Oregon
- KAKA (FM) in Salina, Kansas
- KAKL in Anchorage, Alaska
- KAKU-LP in Kahului, Hawaii
- KALA (FM) in Davenport, Iowa
- KARQ in San Luis Obispo, California
- KAVE in Oakridge, Oregon
- KAWF in Selma, California
- KAYK in Victoria, Texas
- KBDC in Mason City, Iowa
- KBEM in Minneapolis, Minnesota
- KBMD in Marble Falls, Texas
- KBQC in Independence, Kansas
- KBSY in Burley, Idaho
- KCIC in Grand Junction, Colorado
- KCKT in Crockett, Texas
- KCRB in Bemidji, Minnesota
- KCSN in Northridge, California
- KDPI in Ketchum, Idaho
- KEDC (FM) in Hearne, Texas
- KENG in Ruidoso, New Mexico
- KENU (FM) in Des Moines, New Mexico
- KEOM in Mesquite, Texas
- KERU in Blythe, California
- KEYA in Belcourt, North Dakota
- KGHY in Beaumont, Texas
- KGNU-FM in Boulder, Colorado
- KHEW in Rocky Boy's Reservation, Montana
- KHIB in Bastrop, Texas
- KHMS in Victorville, California
- KIAD in Dubuque, Iowa
- KJLJ in Scott City, Kansas
- KJNW in Kansas City, Missouri
- KKJJ in Diamond City, Arkansas
- KKRN in Bella Vista, California
- KLCQ in Durango, Colorado
- KLCV in Lincoln, Nebraska
- KLDX in Sioux Center, Iowa
- KLHV in Cotton Valley, Louisiana
- KLKA in Globe, Arizona
- KLMF in Klamath Falls, Oregon
- KLRF (FM) in Milton-Freewater, Oregon
- KLRW in San Angelo, Texas
- KMQX in Weatherford, Texas
- KMST in Rolla, Missouri
- KMUZ in Turner, Oregon
- KNKO in Shageluk, Alaska
- KNKX in Tacoma, Washington
- KNPC in Hardin, Montana
- KNPJ in Greybull, Wyoming
- KOIR in Edinburg, Texas
- KOMQ in Omak, Washington
- KOYR in Yorktown, Arkansas
- KPIJ in Junction City, Oregon
- KPMB (FM) in Plainview, Texas
- KPSC (FM) in Palm Springs, California
- KQBV in Adel, Iowa
- KQED in San Francisco, California
- KRFY in Ponderay, Idaho
- KRLF in Pullman, Washington
- KRNC in Steamboat Springs, Colorado
- KRSU (FM) in Appleton, Minnesota
- KSAY in Hamlin, Texas
- KSBA in Coos Bay, Oregon
- KSBR in Mission Viejo, California
- KSNH in Snowflake, Arizona
- KTEP in El Paso, Texas
- KTKL in Stigler, Oklahoma
- KTYC in Nashville, Arkansas
- KURE in Ames, Iowa
- KUSK in Vernal, Utah
- KUWY in Laramie, Wyoming
- KUXO in Marfa, Texas
- KUXU in Monroe, Utah
- KVCC in Tucson, Arizona
- KVFE in Del Rio, Texas
- KVID in Mesquite, Nevada
- KVLT in Temple, Texas
- KVQI in Vail, Colorado
- KVUH in Laytonville, California
- KWLK in Westwood, California
- KWMV (FM) in Mountain View, Arkansas
- KWPU in Oskaloosa, Iowa
- KWRX in Redmond, Oregon
- KWTW in Bishop, California
- KYPH in Helena, Montana
- KYUA in Inyokern, California
- KYVT in Yakima, Washington
- KZTH in Piedmont, Oklahoma
- WAED in Sheridan, Illinois
- WAHP in Belton, South Carolina
- WAIB-LP in Redwood, New York
- WAMU in Washington, District of Columbia
- WANR in Brewster, New York
- WBEL in Cairo, Illinois
- WBHY in Mobile, Alabama
- WBMK in Morehead, Kentucky
- WBNH in Pekin, Illinois
- WCII in Spencer, New York
- WCOA-FM in Johnstown, Pennsylvania
- WCRT in Terre Haute, Indiana
- WCTP in Gagetown, Michigan
- WCUG in Lumpkin, Georgia
- WEDW in Stamford, Connecticut
- WEKC in Corbin, Kentucky
- WFCF in Saint Augustine, Florida
- WFCH in Charleston, South Carolina
- WFCR in Amherst, Massachusetts
- WFDD in Winston-Salem, North Carolina
- WGBK in Glenview, Illinois
- WGCA in Quincy, Illinois
- WGNC-FM in Constantine, Michigan
- WGNV in Milladore, Wisconsin
- WGRH in Hinckley, Minnesota
- WGVU in Allendale, Michigan
- WHCF in Bangor, Maine
- WHFH in Flossmoor, Illinois
- WHPK in Chicago, Illinois
- WHRG in Gloucester Point, Virginia
- WHSD in Hinsdale, Illinois
- WIAB in Mackinaw City, Michigan
- WJBE-FM in Five Points, Alabama
- WJFM in Baton Rouge, Louisiana
- WJIA in Guntersville, Alabama
- WJIE in Okolona, Kentucky
- WJLZ in Virginia Beach, Virginia
- WJOM in Eagle, Michigan
- WJSU in Jackson, Mississippi
- WKEN in Kenton, Ohio
- WKHW in Halifax, Pennsylvania
- WKPX in Sunrise, Florida
- WKTH in Tullahoma, Tennessee
- WKUA in Moundville, Alabama
- WKWZ in Syosset, New York
- WLJR in Birmingham, Alabama
- WLUZ in Levittown, Puerto Rico
- WMCE-FM in Erie, Pennsylvania
- WMFL in Florida City, Florida
- WMHY in Richfield Springs, New York
- WMNF in Tampa, Florida
- WMQS in Murphy, North Carolina
- WMUB in Oxford, Ohio
- WMUW in Columbus, Mississippi
- WNJP in Sussex, New Jersey
- WNMP in Marlinton, West Virginia
- WNPP in Cole, Indiana
- WOAS in Ontonagon, Michigan
- WPMW in Middleborough Center, Massachusetts
- WPOB in Plainview, New York
- WPVM in Sturgeon Bay, Wisconsin
- WQCP in Clewiston, Florida
- WQOX in Memphis, Tennessee
- WRAS in Atlanta, Georgia
- WRKC in Wilkes-Barre, Pennsylvania
- WRKJ in Westbrook, Maine
- WRRS (FM) in Bayview, Massachusetts
- WRTP in Roanoke Rapids, North Carolina
- WRUR in Rochester, New York
- WSDC (FM) in Sneedville, Tennessee
- WSEW in Sanford, Maine
- WSFI in Antioch, Illinois
- WSLT in Statesboro, Georgia
- WSSU in Superior, Wisconsin
- WTMK in Wanatah, Indiana
- WTTU in Cookeville, Tennessee
- WUFQ in Cross City, Florida
- WUSM in Hattiesburg, Mississippi
- WVBL in Bluefield, West Virginia
- WVCP in Gallatin, Tennessee
- WVDA in Valdosta, Georgia
- WVOF in Fairfield, Connecticut
- WVPA in Saint Johnsbury, Vermont
- WVPB in Charleston, West Virginia
- WVTW in Charlottesville, Virginia
- WWQS in Decatur, Tennessee
- WWRN in Rockport, Massachusetts
- WXPI in Jersey Shore, Pennsylvania
- WXPN in Philadelphia, Pennsylvania
- WYFU in Masontown, Pennsylvania
- WYFV in Cayce, South Carolina
- WYOR (FM) in Republic, Ohio
- WYSA in Wauseon, Ohio
- WYSU in Youngstown, Ohio
- WYVL in Youngsville, Pennsylvania
- WZDG in Scotts Hill, North Carolina
- WZNB in New Bern, North Carolina
- WZXX in Lawrenceburg, Tennessee
