= KPMB (FM) =

Radio station in Plainview, Texas, United States

- Plainview, Texas; United States
- Broadcast area: Hale County, Texas
- Frequency: 88.5 MHz
- Branding: La Radio Cristiana

Programming
- Language: Spanish
- Format: Christian

Ownership
- Owner: Centro Cristiano de Vida Eterna

History
- First air date: 1999

Technical information
- Licensing authority: FCC
- Facility ID: 88451
- Class: A
- ERP: 3,000 watts
- HAAT: 86 meters (282 ft)
- Transmitter coordinates: 34°13′14″N 101°42′52″W

Links
- Public license information: Public file; LMS

KPMB (88.5 FM, "La Radio Cristiana") is an American radio station licensed since 1999 to serve the community of Plainview, the county seat of Hale County, Texas. The station's broadcast license is held by Centro Cristiano de Vida Eterna.

== Programming ==
KPMB broadcasts a Spanish-language Christian radio format to the greater Plainview, Texas, area as an affiliate of the La Radio Cristiana radio network.

== History ==
In July 1997, Paulino Bernal Evangelism applied to the Federal Communications Commission (FCC) for a construction permit for a new broadcast radio station. The FCC granted this permit on June 30, 1998, with a scheduled expiration date of December 30, 1999. The new station was assigned call sign "KPMB" on November 23, 1999. After construction, modification, and testing were completed in December 1999, the station was granted its broadcast license on March 30, 2000.

Paulino Bernal Evangelism was run by accordion player and Christian evangelist Paulino D. Bernal Sr. of McAllen, Texas, and his family. In addition to KPMB, Paulino Bernal was also the license holder for Texas radio stations KCLR, KMAE, KMFM, KPBM, and KUBR. Bernal also owns 100% of the stock in KVOZ (890 AM, Del Mar Hills, Texas) license holder Consolidated Radio, Inc. Paulino Bernal Evangelism owns KAZF, KCZO, KPBB, KPBD, KPBE, KPBJ (since deleted by the FCC for excessive off air time), and KVFM in Texas plus KZPI in Deming, New Mexico. Station KPBD has been off the air since 2009. It and KTUE (AM) in Tulia, Texas, were both deleted by the FCC in 2011.

According to reports in the Plainview Daily Herald, KPMB fell silent in late July 2008 and remained off the air for at least three months as the station sought donations from "individuals, church groups, or businesses" to resume broadcasting. No "silent" notification is on file with the FCC.

Effective July 26, 2019, KPBM was sold to Centro Cristiano de Vida Eterna, along with KVFM and 14 translators, for $700,000.
