= KMFM =

KMFM may refer to:

- KMFM (radio network), a radio network in Kent, UK
- KMFM (Texas), a radio station in Premont, Texas, United States
