= KCLR =

KCLR may refer to:

- KCLR-FM, a radio station (99.3 FM) licensed to Boonville, Missouri, United States
- KCLR 96FM, a radio station that broadcasts to Carlow and Kilkenny in Ireland
- Cliff Hatfield Memorial Airport (ICAO code KCLR)
- KCLR (AM), a defunct radio station (1530 AM) licensed to Ralls, Texas, United States
