= KPMB =

KPMB may refer to:

- KPMB (FM), a radio station (88.5 FM) licensed to Plainview, Texas, United States
- Pembina Municipal Airport (ICAO airport code KPMB) in Pembina, North Dakota, United States
- KPMB Architects, an architecture firm based in Toronto, Ontario, Canada
