= XHBM =

XHBM may refer to:

- XHBM-FM, a radio station (105.7 FM) in San Luis Potosí, San Luis Potosí, Mexico
- XHBM-TDT, a television station (channel 34, virtual 2) in Mexicali, Baja California, Mexico
