= WKPW =

Radio station in Knightstown, Indiana

- Knightstown, Indiana; United States
- Broadcast area: Greenfield, Indiana; New Castle, Indiana; Rushville, Indiana
- Frequency: 90.7 MHz
- Branding: Classic Hits 90.7FM

Programming
- Format: Classic hits; Classic rock; Oldies

Ownership
- Owner: New Castle Career Center
- Operator: Knightstown High School

History
- First air date: September 7, 1993

Technical information
- Licensing authority: FCC
- Facility ID: 28464
- Class: A
- ERP: 4,400 watts
- HAAT: 55 meters (180 ft)
- Transmitter coordinates: 39°46′1.0″N 85°31′0.0″W

Links
- Public license information: Public file; LMS
- Webcast: Listen live
- Website: www.wkpwfm.com

WKPW is a classic hits, classic rock and oldies formatted noncommercial broadcast radio station licensed to Knightstown, Indiana. WKPW is owned by New Castle Career Center and operated by students at Knightstown High School.

== History ==
WKPW was originally operated by Indiana Soldiers' and Sailors' Children's Home in Knightstown. Instructor/program director Mike York, who had worked in the Indianapolis radio market for many years at WIBC, WNAP and WENS, designed the studios. The students, under York's supervision, assisted with building and outfitting of the broadcast facility. The project was under the direction of ISSCH superintendent Robert Molnar, assistant superintendent John Wittkamper and Eder Career Center director Paul Wilkinson.

The project was completed after nearly two years and on September 23, 1993, WKPW began broadcasting a radiated power of 250 watts on a 100-foot (30.48 m) tower. Early programming consisted of country music, Top 40 and oldies during the school week. The original license was only valid during the school day and the transmitter would be turned off at 3 pm each day. On January 10, 1994, WKPW began broadcasting 24 hours a day with the help of a TM Century Ultimate Digital CD Automation System and engineer Dan Parrish.

At the beginning of 1994 WKPW submitted an application to the FCC for a power increase to 4,400 watts and a tower height increase to 180 feet (55 m) as well the ability to broadcast 24 hours a day. On July 14 of that year, the application was approved by the FCC and WKPW began all-day broadcasting. June 2001 saw the implementation of a Broadcast Electronics Audio Vault 100 Digital Automation System. In the summer of July 2005 the automation system was upgraded again to the Audio Vault 2 system.

In January 2009, Indiana Governor Mitch Daniels decided to close the ISSCH and turn it over to the Indiana National Guard Youth Challenge Academy. Veterans, veteran organizations, parents, teachers, students along with the public, protested at the Indiana State House while submitting thousands of signatures on petitions to stop the closing of the facility. The governor's decision was final and WKPW and the Broadcasting Program along with the other career and technical programs were in jeopardy of going away permanently. The New Castle Career Center stepped in and made the decision that all programs would be moved to the career center in New Castle, Indiana with the exception of WKPW and the Broadcasting Program. Knightstown High School and the Charles A. Beard School Board proposed that the program and radio station be moved to that school.

In 2009, plans were being finalized to move the radio station to the high school. A seldom used area known as the Stage Craft room was chosen to be the home of the new studios. The studio floor plans were designed and approved. In January 2010, the students in the Broadcasting Program, along with York, began the renovation process. Countless hours, days and weekends were spent on the construction, decorating and implementation of equipment. During the construction process, the station's FCC license was transferred from ISSCH to the New Castle Career Center. Upon completion of the facilities, the final pieces of equipment were installed on May 24–25, 2011 under the direction of Chief Engineer Robert Hawkins and studio engineer Chuck Hurley. On May 26, 2011, broadcasting began from the showcase studios at Knightstown High School. 2016 provided the opportunity to build two new production rooms, taking almost a year to complete.

== Programming ==
WKPW is a student noncommercial radio station playing classic hits from the 1960s, 1970s, 1980s and mid-1990s. Students are live daily Monday thru Friday from 8 am to 2 pm. Voice tracked shows are also done daily for later playback. Students broadcast an hourly newscast, including sports and local weather forecast and conditions at :55 each hour. ABC News Radio is utilized when students are not live daily.

Special weekend shows are featured including The Stone Man Dance Party, hosted by Steven Stone, Saturday nights from 8 to 11 pm. The show features songs from the 1960s and 1970s. Charles A. Beard Superintendent, Jediah Behny, is the host for the weekly show "Superintendents Corner" every Saturday during the school year. The show covers a variety of topics including state legislative bills, state and local educational happenings and interviews from teachers and coaches to state lawmakers.

== Awards ==
WKPW has won 29 State Championships in the Indiana Association of School Broadcasters State Finals and well as two Indiana High School Radio Station of the Year awards.

== Station information ==
WKPW broadcasts at 4,400 watts on 90.7 MHz on a 180-foot (54.86 m) 24 hours a day. WKPW serves the Greenfield, New Castle, and Rushville in Indiana communities. The tower signal has the potential to reach nearly 38,000+ listeners daily.

== Famous alumni ==
• Ryan Gorman, Owner/producer/Engineer of Music is Me Recording Studio, Glasgow, Kentucky. Drum Tech and Support Staff while touring with Lynyrd Skynyrd, Kid Rock, Nickelback, Seether, Motörhead, Duff McKagan and The Deftones.

• Eric Leffler, (D.J.EL), Party DJ, Carnival Cruise Lines, Jacksonville Armada FC, Jacksonville Jaguars, Florida-Georgia Line.

• Cara Denis, Co-host Clear 99 Morning Show,(KCLR), Columbia, Missouri. CMA Small Market Station of the Year.

• Rick King, King Sound Recording Studio, Paducah, Kentucky, former host of Morning Edition on NPR radio.

== Key Personnel ==
• General Manager, Mackenzie Jackson

• Program Director/Instructor, Mike York

• Chief Engineer, Robert Hawkins

• Superintendent, Jediah Behny

• I.T. Director, Brian Woods
