= KDPI =

KDPI may refer to:

- KDPI (FM), a radio station (88.5 FM) licensed to serve Ketchum, Idaho, United States
- Democratic Party of Iranian Kurdistan
