= XHESL-FM =

Radio station in San Luis Potosí, San Luis Potosí, Mexico

- San Luis Potosí, San Luis Potosí; Mexico
- Frequency: 102.1 MHz
- Branding: Exa FM

Programming
- Format: Pop music in English and Spanish
- Affiliations: MVS Radio

Ownership
- Owner: MG Radio; (Radiocomunicación Enfocada, S.A. de C.V.)
- Sister stations: XHTL-FM, XHWZ-FM, XHOB-FM

History
- First air date: January 22, 1946 (concession)
- Former call signs: XESL-AM
- Former frequencies: 1340 kHz
- Call sign meaning: San Luis

Technical information
- Class: B1
- ERP: 25 kW
- Transmitter coordinates: 22°10′24″N 100°55′28″W

Links
- Webcast: Listen live
- Website: exafm.com

XHESL-FM is a radio station on 102.1 FM in San Luis Potosí, San Luis Potosí. It is owned by MG Radio and carries the Exa FM pop music format in English and Spanish from MVS Radio.

== History ==
XESL-AM 1340 received its concession on January 22, 1946. It was known as Radio San Luis and later as Radio Futurama. It was owned by Ceferino Z. Jiménez who also owned XECZ and XEPO.

By the late 1980s, XESL had been affiliated to OIR and was running a Spanish-language adult hits format known as Radio Variedades. This changed slightly in the mid-1990s, under new ownership. In 1999, XESL became Regional Mexican-formatted Cancionera 1340, a format it held until the mid-2000s with a one-month exception in 2002, when it carried the short-lived Red W Interactiva news/talk network.

MG Radio took over the station in 2002 and gave it another Spanish adult hits format, known as Señal 1340 Golden Music. This format went off the air on September 19, 2010 to make way for the Romance format, which was moved from XHSS-FM 91.9.

On February 22, 2011, XHESL-FM 102.1 signed on, and the newly minted combo flipped to the Ke Buena national Regional Mexican format from Televisa Radio. In June 2012, this was transitioned over to the competing La Z format from OIR. The AM station went off the air in January 2014.

In October 2016, XHESL flipped to Exa FM as part of a new alliance between MG and MVS Radio. The format had been dropped by GlobalMedia's XHOD-FM on 96.9 15 days prior.
