= XHCN-FM =

Radio station in Irapuato, Guanajuato, Mexico

Irapuato, Guanajuato; Mexico
- Frequency: 88.5 FM
- Branding: Los 40

Programming
- Format: Spanish & English Top 40 (CHR)
- Affiliations: Radiópolis

Ownership
- Owner: Radio Grupo Antonio Contreras; (Radio XECN, S.A. de C.V.)

History
- First air date: July 1, 1963 (concession)
- Call sign meaning: CoNtreras

Technical information
- ERP: 3 kW
- Transmitter coordinates: 20°42′12.92″N 101°20′28.51″W

Links
- Webcast: Listen live
- Website: los40irapuato.com

XHCN-FM is a radio station on 88.5 FM in Irapuato, Guanajuato, Mexico. XHCN is owned by Radio Grupo Antonio Contreras and carries the Los 40 format.

== History ==
XHCN began as XECN-AM 1080. Owned by Antonio Contreras Hidalgo, XECN received its concession on July 1, 1963.

XECN moved to FM in 2011 on 88.5 MHz.
