= XHEI-FM =

Radio station in San Luis Potosí, San Luis Potosí, Mexico

- San Luis Potosí, San Luis Potosí; Mexico
- Frequency: 93.1 MHz
- Branding: Romántica

Programming
- Format: Spanish adult hits

Ownership
- Owner: Grupo Radiorama; (XEEI-AM, S.A. de C.V.)
- Operator: Grupo AS Comunicación
- Sister stations: XHSS-FM

History
- First air date: 1985
- Former call signs: XEEI-AM
- Former frequencies: 1070 AM

Technical information
- Licensing authority: CRT
- Class: B1
- ERP: 25 kW
- HAAT: 13.8 m (45 ft)
- Transmitter coordinates: 22°12′27″N 101°01′39″W

Links
- Webcast: Listen live
- Website: grupoasradio.com

XHEI-FM is a radio station in San Luis Potosí, San Luis Potosí. Broadcasting on 93.1 FM, XHEI is owned by Grupo Radiorama and carries a Spanish-language adult hits format known as Romántica.

== History ==
XEEI-AM 1070 signed on in 1985 as Radiorama's first affiliated station in the state of San Luis Potosí, known as Radio Servicio Social and owned by a concessionaire of the same name; its concession was awarded March 12, 1986. In the early 1990s, after doubling its power, XEEI became "La Mexicana" with a Regional Mexican format, later "Fiesta Mexicana", and then "Romántica 10-70" in January 1999.

In 2002, MG Radio took over operations of the station, which became known as "Momentos 10-70". Radio S.A. took control in January 2006, turning XEEI into "Radio Trece 1070 AM" and rebroadcasting XEDA-AM's talk programming. MG Radio once more began operating XEEI in January 2008, giving it the Ke Buena Regional Mexican format from Televisa Radio.

In September 2010, XEEI and XHSS-FM 91.9 were sold to Radiorama, which briefly operated XEEI as "La Poderosa" with yet another new name and format. On December 29 of that year, XEEI gained its FM counterpart, XHEI-FM 93.1, and on January 31, 2011, the new AM-FM combo began stunting to a new format, "Antena Radio 93.1" (stylized as ANT:NA), with rock and alternative music in English and Spanish. The format did not make it out of 2011, and the Spanish adult hits format returned on October 12 of that year.

In July 2012, as a result of XEWA-AM/XHEWA-FM's format change to Los 40 Principales, XHEI began airing select W Radio programs until December 2016.
