= XHZUM-FM =

Radio station in Zumpango, State of Mexico

Zumpango, Mexico, Mexico; Mexico
- Frequency: 88.5 FM
- Branding: Mexiquense Radio

Ownership
- Owner: Gobierno del Estado de México

History
- First air date: 2002
- Call sign meaning: ZUMpango

Technical information
- ERP: .5 kW

Links
- Webcast: Listen live
- Website: sistemamexiquense.mx/radio

XHZUM-FM is a radio station in Zumpango on 88.5 FM, owned by the government of the State of Mexico. It is part of the Radio Mexiquense state radio network.

XHZUM was added in 2002 as part of an expansion of Radio Mexiquense with four new FM stations.
