= XHOD-FM =

Radio station in San Luis Potosí, San Luis Potosí, México

San Luis Potosí, San Luis Potosí; Mexico
- Frequency: 96.9 MHz
- Branding: Vox FM

Programming
- Format: Adult contemporary
- Affiliations: Radiopolis

Ownership
- Owner: GlobalMedia; (Transmisiones Mik, S.A. de C.V.)
- Sister stations: XHBM-FM, XHEPO-FM, XHEWA-FM, XHPM-FM, XHSMR-FM, XHCCBY-FM

History
- First air date: September 22, 1971 (concession)

Technical information
- ERP: 41.89 kW
- Transmitter coordinates: 22°08′40.5″N 100°57′25.5″W

Links
- Webcast: Listen live
- Website: globalmedia.mx

XHOD-FM is a radio station on 96.9 FM in San Luis Potosí, San Luis Potosí, Mexico. It is owned by GlobalMedia and known as Vox FM Radio Hits with an adult contemporary format.

== History ==
Logo used 2018–2022 with the Vox 'Love Station' format

XHOD received its concession on September 22, 1971; while it got its concession two days after XHOB-FM 96.1, it is considered the first FM radio station in the state. It was owned by María Estela Martínez. The original format was known as OD 96.9, Otra Dimensión en Radio. Within several years, station manager Elías Navarro Martínez had affiliated to MVS Radio and the station picked up its FM Globo romantic format in 1978.

In San Luis Potosí, however, FM Globo mutated. In 1999, XHOD became "Globo FM 96.9" and played as many as 70% songs in English, with a rock and pop-heavy format. In January 2000, XHOD was converted to the new Exa FM format. November 2, 2009, saw the MVS stations in San Luis Potosí fall under the control of GlobalMedia.

In October 2016, Exa FM moved to XHESL-FM, while XHOD remained a pop station, calling itself "96.9". The temporary format was replaced on January 9, 2017, with the RMX rock format from Grupo Imagen. The format lasted just over 18 months, being replaced on August 4, 2018, with "Vox Love Station", airing romantic music; the Vox Love Station format was syndicated by Radiópolis.

On March 1, 2021, GlobalMedia dropped Vox Love Station for programming from El Heraldo Radio, though the station brands as GlobalMedia 96.9. After 3 weeks, on March 20, the Vox Love Station branding returned with the El Heraldo Radio programs retained. The Vox format was retooled to adult contemporary on September 1, 2022.
