= XHAFQ-FM =

Radio station in Cosoleacaque/Minatitlán, Veracruz

- Cosoleacaque, Veracruz; Mexico
- Broadcast area: Minatitlán
- Frequency: 88.5 FM
- Branding: La Súper Q

Programming
- Format: Adult contemporary

Ownership
- Owner: Grupo Radiorama (ORM, Organización Radiofónica Mexicana); (Radiodifusora XEAFQ-AM, S.A. de C.V.)

History
- First air date: June 29, 1967 (concession)

Technical information
- Licensing authority: CRT
- Class: B1
- ERP: 25 kW
- HAAT: 31.26 m
- Transmitter coordinates: 17°59′10.21″N 94°32′40.47″W

Links
- Website: web.facebook.com/LaQ88.5FM

XHAFQ-FM is a radio station on 88.5 FM in Cosoleacaque and Minatitlán, Veracruz, Mexico. The station is owned by Grupo Radiorama and It broadcasts an adult contemporary format known as La Súper Q.

== History ==
Logo as Romántica used until 2017

XEJV-AM 1420 received its concession on June 29, 1967. It was owned by Arnulfo Aguirre Salamanca and broadcast from facilities in Jaltipan with 1,000 watts day and 250 night. In 1973, Aguirre sold to Laura Escamilla de Martínez, and in the 1990s, XEJV became XEAFQ-AM. The station was later owned by Laura Escamilla Decuir prior to its sale to Radiorama.

XEAFQ was cleared for AM-FM migration in 2010 as XHAFQ-FM 88.5. Since migration, the station has been known as Mariachi Stereo, Romántica, Vida Romántica, Love FM, and La Super Q. In 2024, it became a Heraldo Radio affiliate, returning the network to southern Veracruz after a previous stint on XHGB-FM 103.5.

In mid-2025, Heraldo Radio leaves and La Súper Q returns.
