= KTEP =

Public radio station in El Paso, Texas, United States owned by the University of Texas

- El Paso, Texas; United States
- Broadcast area: El Paso metropolitan area Ciudad Juárez, Chihuahua
- Frequency: 88.5 MHz (HD Radio)
- Branding: KTEP 88.5 FM

Programming
- Language: English
- Format: Public radio, talk, Jazz and classical
- Affiliations: NPR; APM; PRX

Ownership
- Owner: University of Texas at El Paso

History
- Founded: 1946
- First air date: September 14, 1950
- Call sign meaning: Texas El Paso

Technical information
- Licensing authority: FCC
- Facility ID: 69342
- Class: C1
- ERP: 100,000 watts
- HAAT: 223 meters (732 ft)
- Transmitter coordinates: 31°47′17.00″N 106°28′46.00″W

Links
- Public license information: Public file; LMS
- Webcast: Listen live
- Website: ktep.org

KTEP (88.5 FM) is a non-commercial radio station licensed to El Paso, Texas, United States, serving the El Paso metropolitan area and Ciudad Juárez, Chihuahua, Mexico. A service of the Communication Department at the University of Texas at El Paso, it features a mixed format of news and information from NPR, jazz and classical music. The studios and offices are inside Suite 203 of the Cotton Memorial Building on the campus of UTEP on West University Avenue in El Paso.

KTEP's transmitter is located on the KVIA-TV tower, off of Scenic Drive in El Paso. The signal extends across parts of Texas, New Mexico and the Mexican state of Chihuahua.

== History ==
The station began in October 1946 as WTCM, a carrier current station based at what was then Texas College of Mines. It could only be heard on campus. In 1947, it changed its call sign to KVOF after finding out the WTCM call letters were already being used by a station in Traverse City, Michigan.

In 1950, the college submitted a construction permit for a full Federal Communications Commission (FCC) FM license. It signed on the air on September 14, 1950. The station began broadcasting educational programming aimed at elementary and high school students, as well as evening shows hosted by college students. Originally powered at 10 watts, in 1966 it moved to a taller tower. It began sharing space on a tower owned by television station KROD-TV (now KDBC-TV), boosting its coverage. In 1967, the station changed its call letters to KTEP, to coincide with the school's name change to The University of Texas at El Paso.

In 1971, KTEP became a charter member of National Public Radio (NPR) and increased its broadcast day to 18 hours. The station instituted a 24-hour schedule in 1997.

In 1980, it moved its transmitter to its current location on KVIA-TV's tower, coupled with a boost in power to 100,000 watts. On July 11, 2021, KTEP's transmitter was knocked off-air by a thunderstorm.

== Programming ==
KTEP features news and information programs in mornings and afternoons, largely from NPR and other public radio stations in Texas. Jazz is featured in late mornings and overnights; classical music airs in early afternoons and evenings. Specialty shows and music programming air on weekends.

== Notable alumni ==
- Sam Donaldson, later with ABC News, served as station manager in 1954.
