= XHWAG-FM =

Los 40 radio station in Monterrey

- Monterrey, Nuevo León; Mexico
- Frequency: 88.5 FM (HD Radio)
- Branding: Los 40

Programming
- Format: Spanish & English Top 40 (CHR)

Ownership
- Owner: Radiópolis; (Cadena Radiodifusora Mexicana, S.A. de C.V.)

History
- First air date: May 4, 1961 (concession); June 2, 2018 (FM)
- Former call signs: XEWM-AM, XEWA-AM
- Former frequencies: 540 kHz (1961–2020)
- Call sign meaning: was previously XEW A; E changed to H in migration, G (Guadalupe) added for disambiguation

Technical information
- Licensing authority: CRT
- Class: A
- ERP: 3 kW
- HAAT: −38 meters (−125 ft)
- Transmitter coordinates: 25°37′31.6″N 100°19′15.54″W

Links
- Webcast: Listen live
- Website: los40.com.mx

XHWAG-FM is a radio station on 88.5 FM in Monterrey, Nuevo León, Mexico. It is owned by Radiópolis and carries its Los 40 format.

== History ==
=== Together with San Luis ===
The original XEWA in San Luis Potosí received its concession on December 2, 1948, one of a string of repeaters of XEW-AM 900 Mexico City authorized in the late 1940s. XEWA began operations on the frequency of 540 kHz with 150,000 watts of power — still its current authorized level, making it the most powerful AM radio station in the country.

In May 1961, a second station, initially with call sign XEWM-AM, was licensed to operate in Monterrey, Nuevo León, in order to provide daytime XEW service and an improved nighttime signal there; the call letters soon were changed to XEWA-AM to match the co-channel San Luis station. It operates with 1,500 watts during the day and 1,000 watts night. For decades, XEWA in Monterrey simulcasted the San Luis station.

On March 16, 1988, XEWA struck out on its own with a grupera format known as Súper Estelar WA. Broadcasting from Monterrey but heard in both cities, Súper Estelar was programmed by Multimedios Estrellas de Oro and served as one of Mexico's pioneering grupera stations. After five years, Súper Estelar left XEWA and moved to Multimedios-owned FM stations in Monterrey and San Luis; it was also carried on some Multimedios radio stations in other cities until the format became known as La Caliente.

The end of Súper Estelar made way for a flip to the Ke Buena format and operation by Televisa again, which lasted until 1998, when the station began repeating XEW again, now known as "Cadena W Azul y Plata" and later as "W Radio". In 2003, Radiorama began managing the station for Televisa Radio.

=== Split ===
In July 2009, saw the first ever split between XEWA Monterrey and XEWA San Luis Potosí. The San Luis Potosí station was transferred to local radio company MG Radio, while XEWA Monterrey began offering a Nuevo León-specific version of W Radio. In May 2012, the Monterrey station began carrying the news and talk programming of XHMSN-FM 96.5 "Dominio Radio", which lasted for several months until returning to W Radio.

XEWA Monterrey flipped to Los 40 Principales on September 11, 2014, matching the San Luis station though it remained separately programmed and directly run by Televisa Radio. The San Luis station, now on FM as XHEWA-FM 103.9, has been operated by local radio station groups in that city.

=== Migration to FM ===
As a result of second-wave FM migration, XEWA Monterrey began broadcasting on FM on June 2, 2018, becoming XHWAG-FM on 88.5 MHz. The AM station was shut down at 11:59 p.m. on April 25, 2020, after a year of simulcasting.
