= XHWZ-FM =

Radio station in San Luis Potosí, San Luis Potosí, Mexico

- Soledad Diez Gutiérrez–San Luis Potosí, San Luis Potosí; Mexico
- Frequency: 90.9 MHz
- Branding: La Mejor

Programming
- Format: Regional Mexican
- Affiliations: MVS Radio

Ownership
- Owner: MG Radio; (XHWZ 90.9 MHz. F.M,, S.A. de C.V.)
- Sister stations: XHTL-FM, XHOB-FM, XHESL-FM, XHCSM-FM

History
- First air date: May 8, 1979 (concession)
- Former call signs: XEWZ-AM
- Former frequencies: 820 kHz, 620 kHz

Technical information
- Licensing authority: CRT
- ERP: 25 kW
- HAAT: 5.02 m (16.5 ft)
- Transmitter coordinates: 22°10′24″N 100°55′28″W

Links
- Webcast: Listen live
- Website: lamejor.com.mx

XHWZ-FM is a radio station on 90.9 FM in San Luis Potosí, San Luis Potosí, Mexico. It is operated by MG Radio and carries the La Mejor regional Mexican format from MVS Radio.

== History ==
XEWZ-AM 820 received its concession on May 8, 1979. It was owned by Sergio Ramírez Hernández and broadcast from Cerritos with 1 kW as a daytimer. It was moved to Soledad Diez Gutiérrez (with studios in San Luis Potosí) and 620 kHz in the 1990s, broadcasting with 2.5 kW during the day and 500 watts at night and reaching a much wider audience.

On June 7, 2012, XHWZ-FM 90.9 came to air. On September 7, 2013, it flipped from its longtime format of Radio Novedades to become adult contemporary Más FM, operated by MG Radio. It flipped to La Mejor on December 3, 2016, as a result of MG's alignment with MVS. La Mejor had previously been in the market on XHPM-FM 100.1 between 2007 and 2009.
