= WGCA =

Radio station in Quincy, Illinois

Coordinates: 39.972°N 91.328°W

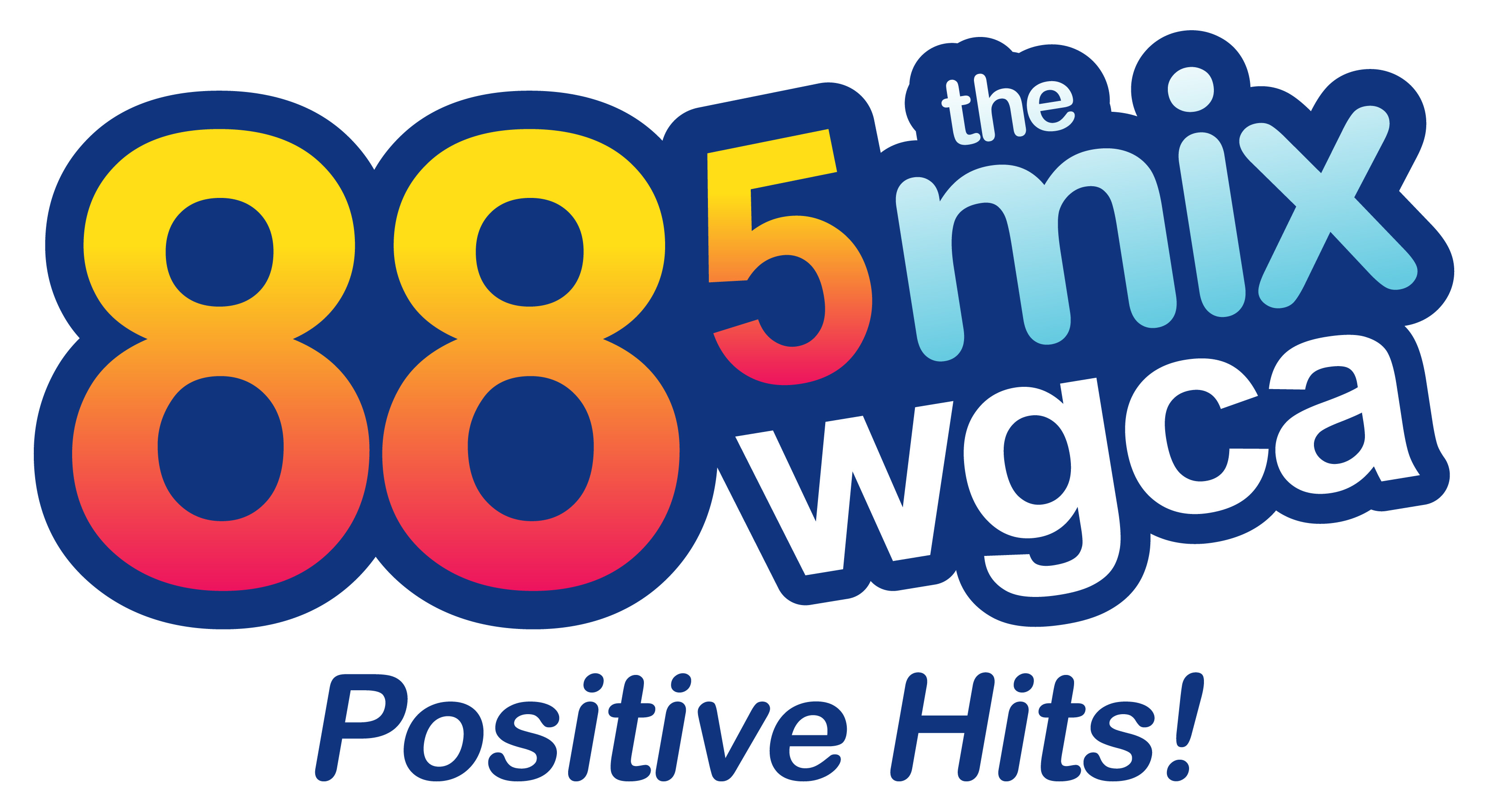
- Quincy, Illinois; United States
- Broadcast area: Quincy, Illinois; Hannibal, Missouri
- Frequency: 88.5 MHz

Programming
- Format: Contemporary Christian music

Ownership
- Owner: Great Commission Broadcasting Corporation

History
- First air date: September 21, 1987; 38 years ago
- Former call signs: WGCA-FM (1986–2023)
- Call sign meaning: "We're God's Christian Alternative"

Technical information
- Licensing authority: FCC
- Facility ID: 24944
- Class: B
- ERP: 40,000 watts
- HAAT: 137 meters (449 ft)

Links
- Public license information: Public file; LMS
- Website: www.wgca.org

WGCA (88.5 FM) is a local Christian radio station in Quincy, Illinois. The station airs a contemporary Christian music format, and serves the areas of Quincy, Illinois, Hannibal, Missouri, and Keokuk, Iowa.

== History ==
Started in 1987 as a cable radio station called Sunshine Radio, WGCA grew and was soon established as a full-fledged broadcast radio station.

Over the course of its history, WGCA has sponsored a number of events and concerts in the Quincy area. In its early years, it welcomed artists like Rebecca St. James and Todd Agnew. From 2005 to 2007, WGCA-FM was the primary local sponsor for SHOUTfest, which is a group of traveling contemporary Christian artists. These day-long concerts were held at Quincy's Clatt Adams Park. In the 2010s, they brought artists like Casting Crowns, Skillet, Newsboys, and For King & Country.

In addition to concerts, WGCA has also been active in bringing special events like March For Jesus and MixFest.
