= WPOB =

Under a "Shared Time" agreement with WKWZ Syosset, New York
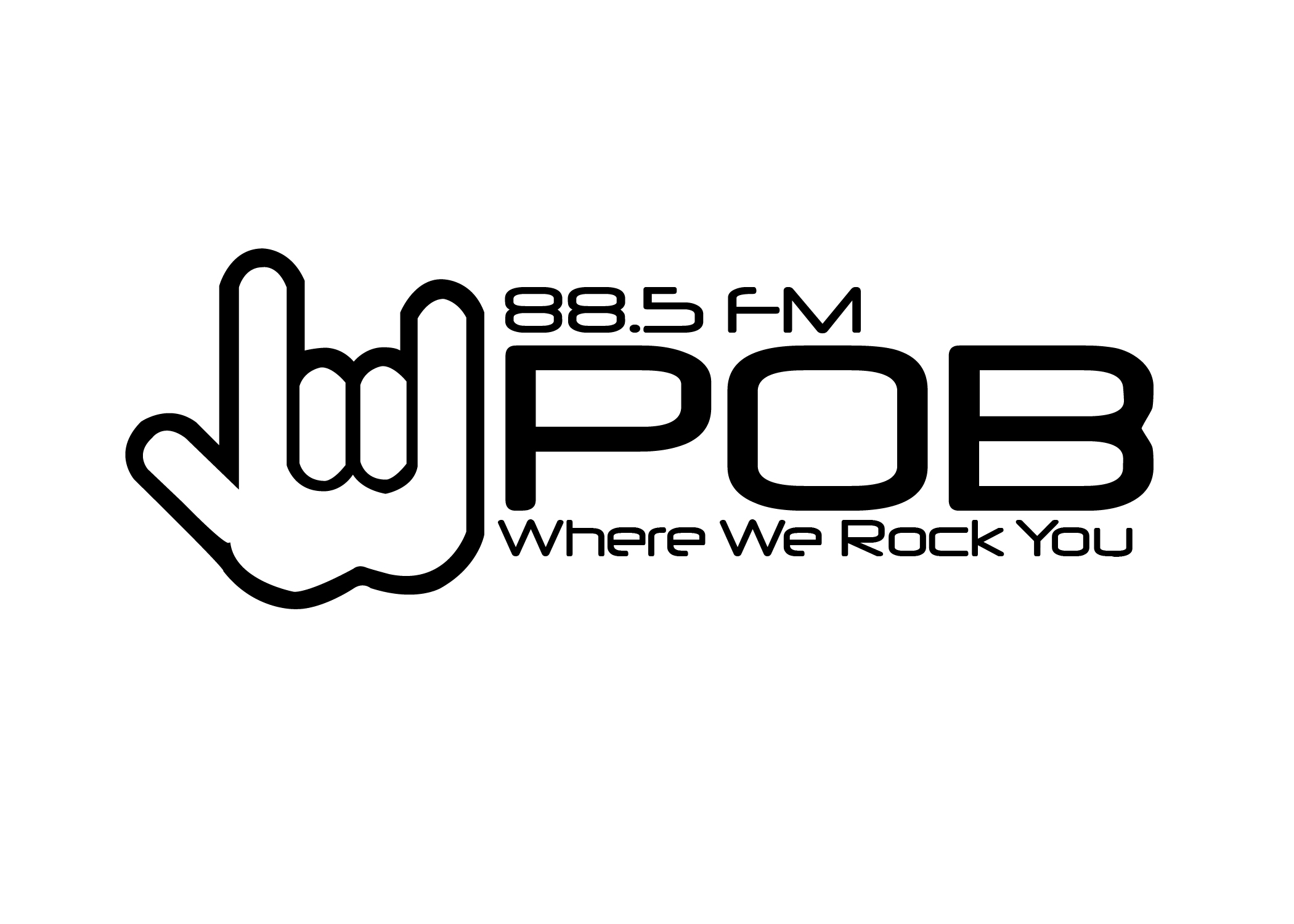
- Plainview, New York; United States
- Broadcast area: Oyster Bay, New York
- Frequency: 88.5 MHz

Programming
- Language: English
- Format: High school radio

Ownership
- Owner: Plainview-Old Bethpage Central School District

History
- First air date: 1972
- Call sign meaning: Plainview Old-Bethpage

Technical information
- Licensing authority: FCC
- Facility ID: 52782
- Class: A
- ERP: 125 watts
- HAAT: 79 meters (259 ft)
- Transmitter coordinates: 40°47′48″N 73°27′44″W

Links
- Public license information: Public file; LMS
- Webcast: Listen live
- Website: wpobfmradio.wixsite.com/wpob

WPOB (88.5 FM) is a high school radio station licensed to Plainview, New York. WPOB is a community radio station funded by the Plainview-Old Bethpage Central School District and has been broadcasting since 1972. WPOB is broadcast by students at Plainview – Old Bethpage John F. Kennedy High School partaking in a three-year course in radio engineering, producing, and broadcasting. The station airs from 7:00 am to 2:30 pm weekdays, handing off to Syosset High School's WKWZ in Syosset, New York (which is on the air from 2:30 pm to 11:00 pm).

== Early days ==
WPOB was a project sponsored by Plainview-Old Bethpage School Board member Joseph Scholnick, a sound-effects pioneer of the 1950s broadcast radio scene, who also was the original FCC licensed engineer responsible for regulatory compliance at the station. Student run, with oversight from Dr. Louis Brown, WPOB initially broadcast, almost exclusively, news and educational programming. By the mid-1970s however, WPOB's programming format had shifted to include student-generated content and popular music programming, eventually adding more modern rock and roll content.

The content produced by students was composed, directed, and engineered as a learning experience and included regular episodic comedy, such as "The Adventures of Captain Kwizdo" (a thinly veiled homage to the "Mark Time" routine performed by the professional comedy troupe The Firesign Theatre), a weekly sports review (which mimicked the styling of the famous sportscaster Howard Cosell), alternative music, current events programming (such as "Music You Don't Know From a Guy You Don't Care About"), and informational news magazines. Students were also encouraged to produce their own promotional material, jingles, and other content. Station personnel often recruited school music students, actors, and athletes to contribute content such as jingles and other broadcast promotions for their work.

== WPOB Today ==
The station updated their music library and computer systems in 2026 to include a mix of new popular music and all-time favorites. This update was spearheaded Primarily by Noah Greenblatt and assisted by David Mirlis, Eytan Bennet, Nick Henriques, and Logan Pick.

WPOB DJs get approximately 40 minutes to do what they want with their shows. These DJs are students of Plainview Old Bethpage John F. Kennedy High school. The station livestreams music, public service announcements (PSA), and the news every Friday via WPOB'S official website. The station is a member of the Emergency Alert System (EAS) and will alert the greater Plainview area of any dangerous situations. The newest update to the WPOB station is a TV being added to their booth and over 3,000 CDs donated to the station.

The station's programming is student generated and there are courses available to further the student knowledge on broadcast communications. WPOB is run through the English Department at POB-JFK High School.

Since July 2020, WPOB transmits to the local community through a RoIP system to provide the best quality sound.

== See also ==
- WKWZ
