= XHSMR-FM =

Radio station in San Luis Potosí, San Luis Potosí

- Villa de Pozos, San Luis Potosí; Mexico
- Broadcast area: San Luis Potosí
- Frequency: 90.1 MHz
- Branding: Trión

Programming
- Format: Alternative rock

Ownership
- Owner: Radio Fórmula; (Transmisora Regional Radio Fórmula, S.A. de C.V.)
- Operator: GlobalMedia
- Sister stations: XHBM-FM, XHEPO-FM, XHEWA-FM, XHOD-FM, XHPM-FM, XHCCBY-FM

History
- First air date: October 1, 1986 (concession)
- Former call signs: XESMR-AM
- Former frequencies: 710 kHz

Technical information
- Facility ID: CRT
- Class: B1
- ERP: 25 kW
- HAAT: −0.8 m (−2.6 ft)
- Transmitter coordinates: 22°05′22.83″N 100°52′44.24″W

Links
- Website: https://www.globalmedia.mx/ https://trion.fm/

XHSMR-FM, also known as Trión, is a radio station on 90.1 FM located in the city of San Luis Potosí, San Luis Potosí, Mexico.

== History ==
XHSMR logo in the early 2010s

XESMR-AM received its concession on October 1, 1986. It was owned by Adrian Loreto Pereda López of Radiorama and broadcast with 1,000 watts. XESMR was sold to Radio Fórmula in 1989, and the concession was transferred a decade later.

In late 2010, XHSMR-FM 90.1 came to air. The AM-FM transition was completed when XESMR ceased broadcasting in April 2014.

In April 2017, XHSMR flipped to the Trión alternative rock format from RF, maintaining RF's national news programs.
