= KSNH =

- Snowflake, Arizona; United States
- Broadcast area: Show Low, Arizona; Snowflake, Arizona
- Frequency: 88.5 MHz

Programming
- Format: Christian radio

Ownership
- Owner: Advance Ministries, Inc. d/b/a New Life Christian School

Technical information
- Licensing authority: FCC
- Facility ID: 177228
- Class: C3
- ERP: 11,000 watts
- HAAT: 3.0 meters (9.8 ft)
- Transmitter coordinates: 34°15′49″N 110°02′21″W

Links
- Public license information: Public file; LMS

KSNH is a Christian radio station licensed to Snowflake, Arizona, broadcasting on 88.5 FM. The station serves the areas of Show Low, Arizona and Snowflake, Arizona, and is owned by Advance Ministries, Inc. d/b/a New Life Christian School.

KSNH's programming includes Christian Talk and Teaching programming including; In Touch with Charles Stanley, Insight for Living with Chuck Swindoll, Turning Point with David Jeremiah, Thru the Bible with J. Vernon McGee, and Back to the Bible with Woodrow Kroll. KSNH also airs a variety of Christian music.
