= WKUA =

- Moundville, Alabama; United States
- Frequency: 88.5 MHz

Programming
- Language: English
- Format: Christian Rock/Rap

Ownership
- Owner: (TBTA Ministries)

History
- First air date: February 2012

Technical information
- Licensing authority: FCC
- Facility ID: 171636
- Class: A
- ERP: 5,500 watts (vertical); 1 watt (horizontal)
- HAAT: 83 meters (272 ft)
- Transmitter coordinates: 34°04′00″N 87°42′01″W

Links
- Public license information: Public file; LMS
- Webcast: http://myrevradio.com/live
- Website: http://www.myrevradio.com

WKUA (88.5 FM) is an American non-commercial educational radio station intended to serve the community of Moundville, Alabama. The station is owned and operated by TBTA Ministries of Irondale, Alabama. WKUA began regular broadcast operations in February 2012 under program test authority while its broadcast license application is pending.

== Programming ==
WKUA broadcasts a Christian Rock/Rap radio format in conjunction with sister stations WKRE (88.1 FM, Argo, Alabama) and WJHO (89.7 FM, Alexander City, Alabama)

== History ==
In October 2007, Kenneth M. Layton's TBTA Ministries of Irondale, Alabama, applied to the Federal Communications Commission (FCC) for a construction permit for a new broadcast radio station. The FCC granted this permit on February 3, 2009, with a scheduled expiration date of February 3, 2012.

In May 2009, TBTA Ministries contracted to transfer the permit for this station to Jimmy Jarrell's Alabama Christian Radio, Inc. The FCC conditionally approved the deal on July 16, 2009, but the transaction was apparently never consummated.

The new station was assigned call sign "WKUA" on December 21, 2011. After construction and testing were completed, the station applied for its broadcast license on February 3, 2012. The Commission accepted the application for filing on February 6, 2012, but as of February 22, 2012, they have taken no further action.
