= KPBD =

Big Spring, Texas; United States
- Broadcast area: Big Spring/Snyder, Texas
- Frequency: 89.3 MHz

Programming
- Language: English
- Format: Defunct

Ownership
- Owner: Paulino Bernal Evangelism

History
- First air date: 2005

Technical information
- Facility ID: 90502
- Class: A
- ERP: 3,000 watts
- HAAT: 100 meters (330 ft)
- Transmitter coordinates: 32°9′51″N 101°25′27″W

KPBD (89.3 FM) is a defunct American non-commercial educational radio station that was licensed to serve the community of Big Spring, the county seat of Howard County, Texas. The station's broadcast license was held by Paulino Bernal Evangelism. The station began broadcasting in June 2005 and went dark in May 2009 which led to the cancellation of the station's broadcast license in June 2011.

== Programming ==
KPBD broadcast a Spanish-language religious radio format to the greater Big Spring-Snyder, Texas, area as a member of the La Nueva Radio Cristiana radio network.

== History ==
In April 1998, Paulino Bernal Evangelism applied to the U.S. Federal Communications Commission (FCC) for a construction permit for a new broadcast radio station. After disputes between multiple applicants for the permit were resolved, the FCC granted this permit on June 3, 2002, with a scheduled expiration date of June 3, 2005. The new station was assigned call sign "KPBD" on May 24, 2005. After construction and testing were completed in late May 2005, the station was granted its broadcast license on January 26, 2006.

The station fell silent for the first time on August 12, 2008. In their August 20, 2008, application for special temporary authority to remain silent, the station's owners cited "a malfunction with the equipment" for the extended lack of broadcasting. The station briefly resumed broadcasting on May 28, 2009, during an attempt to resolve technical issues but shut down the same day after the station's engineer determined the equipment was "not able to maintain operation within licensed parameters".

In their August 20, 2009, application for a new authority to remain silent, the license holder blamed "miscommunication" for their failure to notify the FCC of the events of May 2009. The new application was accepted for filing on August 21, 2009, and the original application was dismissed on August 26, 2009. In the application, station owner Paulino Bernal Jr., stated his belief that repairs could be completed "within the next month" and regular broadcasting resumed.

The station never resumed broadcasting, officially falling dark for the final time on May 28, 2009. Under the terms of the Telecommunications Act of 1996, as a matter of law a radio station's broadcast license is subject to automatic forfeiture and cancellation if they fail to broadcast for one full year.

In June 2011, the FCC notified licensee Paulino Bernal Evangelism that the license for KPBD had expired as a matter of law on May 29, 2010. (The license for "K231AL", this station's broadcast translator, was declared expired at the same time.) After the KPBD broadcast license was cancelled, the KPBD call sign was deleted from the FCC database on June 7, 2011.
