= WJIA =

- Guntersville, Alabama; United States
- Frequency: 88.5 MHz
- Branding: 88.5 J-FM

Programming
- Format: Contemporary Christian

Ownership
- Owner: Lake City Educational Broadcasting Inc.

History
- First air date: August 1995
- Former call signs: WAHF (2/94-5/94)
- Call sign meaning: Where Jesus Is Alive

Technical information
- Licensing authority: FCC
- Facility ID: 36283
- Class: A
- ERP: 2,200 watts
- HAAT: 130.0 meters (427 feet)
- Transmitter coordinates: 34°25′33″N 86°18′25″W

Links
- Public license information: Public file; LMS
- Webcast: Listen Live
- Website: https://885jfm.com

WJIA (88.5 FM, "88.5 J-FM") is a non-commercial radio station licensed to serve Guntersville, Alabama, United States. The station is owned by Lake City Educational Broadcasting Inc.

WJIA broadcasts a Contemporary Christian music format.

== History ==
Pastor Stan Broadus originally attempted to purchase an existing Albertville, Alabama-based AM radio station in 1992 for his ministry but, after considering the cost and complication, his radio consultant persuaded him that starting a new non-commercial FM station would be easier and less expensive. In January 1993, he filed for a construction permit to build a new FM station as Lake City Educational Broadcasting Inc.

This station received its original construction permit from the Federal Communications Commission on December 23, 1993. The new station was assigned the call letters WAHF by the FCC on February 11, 1994. During construction, the station switched callsigns to the current WJIA on May 23, 1994. WJIA received its license to cover from the FCC on June 24, 1997.
