= WZXX =

- Lawrenceburg, Tennessee; United States
- Frequency: 88.5 MHz
- Branding: Radio by Grace

Programming
- Format: Christian radio

Ownership
- Owner: Radio by Grace, Inc.

Technical information
- Licensing authority: FCC
- Facility ID: 89511
- Class: A
- ERP: 76 watts
- HAAT: 166.0 meters (544.6 ft)
- Transmitter coordinates: 35°12′12″N 87°19′39″W
- Translator: See § Translators

Links
- Public license information: Public file; LMS
- Webcast: Listen live
- Website: radiobygrace.com

WZXX (88.5 FM) is a radio station broadcasting a Christian radio format. Licensed to Lawrenceburg, Tennessee, United States, the station is currently owned by Radio by Grace, Inc.

== Translators ==
Call sign	Frequency (MHz)	City of license	State	Facility ID
W220DS	91.9	Montgomery	Alabama	121804
K210DV	89.9	De Queen	Arkansas	151020
K204DI	88.7	Hot Springs	Arkansas	92408
W209CD	89.7	Atlanta	Georgia	152214
W210CG	89.9	Brunswick	Georgia	142658
W201DJ	88.1	Douglas	Georgia	152243
W206BP	89.1	Dublin	Georgia	152259
W219DH	91.7	Macon	Georgia	148623
W214BZ	90.7	Savannah	Georgia	148330
W209CG	89.7	Tallapoosa	Georgia	150669
W204CM	88.7	Waycross	Georgia	146657
K208FB	89.5	Burley	Idaho	152545
K206ED	89.1	Le Mars	Iowa	152205
K218EA	91.5	Ottumwa	Iowa	148639
K240DE	95.9	Sioux City	Iowa	146700
K216GA	91.1	Chanute	Kansas	150677
W203BI	88.5	Bowling Green	Kentucky	64266
W219DI	91.7	Morehead	Kentucky	143879
K208FC	89.5	Arabi	Louisiana	153127
W218CY	91.5	Manistee	Michigan	149168
W209CF	89.7	Gulfport	Mississippi	77029
W217AQ	91.3	Meridian	Mississippi	78018
W214BE	90.7	Raymond	Mississippi	91873
K219KS	91.7	Maryville	Missouri	149124
K212FU	90.3	Lewistown	Montana	141964
K208EW	89.5	Lovelock	Nevada	149480
K212GL	90.3	Tacoma	Washington	155285
K220JL	91.9	Walla Walla	Washington	155099
