= XHRASA-FM =

Radio station in San Luis Potosí, San Luis Potosí, Mexico

- San Luis Potosí, San Luis Potosí; Mexico
- Frequency: 94.1 FM (HD Radio)
- Branding: Candela

Programming
- Format: Regional Mexican

Ownership
- Owner: Cadena RASA; (Multimedia de San Luis, S.A. de C.V.)
- Sister stations: XHNB-FM, XHQK-FM

History
- First air date: April 22, 1964 (concession)
- Former call signs: XEEQ-AM (1964-January 17, 1997); XERASA-AM (January 17, 1997-2015)
- Former frequencies: 760 AM, 750 AM
- Call sign meaning: Cadena RASA

Technical information
- Licensing authority: CRT
- Class: B1
- ERP: 25,000 watts
- HAAT: −86.64 m (−284.3 ft)
- Transmitter coordinates: 22°08′57″N 100°59′44″W

Links
- Webcast: Listen live
- Website: cadenarasa.com

XHRASA-FM is a radio station on 94.1 FM in San Luis Potosí, San Luis Potosí. It is owned by Cadena RASA and carries its Candela Regional Mexican format.

== History ==
XEEQ-AM 760 received its concession on April 22, 1964. It was owned by Radio Potosina, S.A. and broadcast as a 250-watt daytimer with the name "La Pantera" and a rock format.

In the 1980s, XEEQ was affiliated to Radiorama. Radiorama, however, experienced some unexpected corporate turbulence in the mid-1990s, and XEEQ left the group, declared bankruptcy and was shuttered for two years.

After going dark, the station returned with a new frequency, new call letters and a higher power. XERASA-AM 750 broadcast with 1,000 watts day and 100 night; the power increase had been authorized in October 1995, and the callsign change was granted in January 1997. It carried an English-language oldies format similar to RASA's XENK-AM in Mexico City. In 2006, XERASA flipped to Regional Mexican music under the Candela name.

2010 saw the official sign-on of XHRASA-FM 94.1. 750 AM was temporarily shut off in April 2012, but it returned six months later and broadcast until 2015, being shut off again.
