= KPBJ =

Radio station in Midland, Texas (2005–2011)

Midland, Texas; United States
- Broadcast area: Odessa-Midland
- Frequency: 90.1 MHz

Programming
- Format: Defunct

Ownership
- Owner: Paulino Bernal Evangelism

Technical information
- Licensing authority: FCC
- Facility ID: 87247
- Class: A
- ERP: 1,850 watts
- HAAT: 127.0 meters (416.7 ft)
- Transmitter coordinates: 31°57′39.00″N 101°54′25.00″W

Links
- Public license information: Public file; LMS

KPBJ (90.1 FM) was a radio station formerly licensed to Midland, Texas, U.S., serving the Odessa-Midland metropolitan area. The station was owned by Paulino Bernal Evangelism formed by Paulino Bernal.

On June 30, 2011, the Federal Communications Commission canceled the station's license and deleted the call sign from its database.
