= XHQK-FM =

Radio station in San Luis Potosí, San Luis Potosí, Mexico

- San Luis Potosí, San Luis Potosí; Mexico
- Frequency: 98.5 FM
- Branding: Retro

Programming
- Format: English adult contemporary

Ownership
- Owner: Grupo ACIR; (Radio XHQK San Luis Potosí, S. de R.L. de C.V.)
- Operator: Cadena RASA
- Sister stations: XHRASA-FM, XHNB-FM

History
- First air date: October 7, 1977 (concession)

Technical information
- Licensing authority: CRT
- Class: B
- ERP: 31.614 kW
- HAAT: −53.25 m (−174.7 ft)

Links
- Webcast: Listen live
- Website: cadenarasa.com

XHQK-FM is a radio station on 98.5 FM in San Luis Potosí, San Luis Potosí, Mexico. It is owned by Grupo ACIR, operated by Cadena RASA and carries its English adult contemporary format.

== History ==
XHQK received its concession on October 7, 1977. It was owned by ACIR founder Francisco Ibarra López.

On February 26, 2020, the Mix and La Comadre formats swapped frequencies in San Luis, with La Comadre going to XHTL-FM 99.3.

Mix ran on XHQK until May 12, 2026, when Grupo ACIR dropped its formats from the cluster it ran in the market.
