= WTTU =

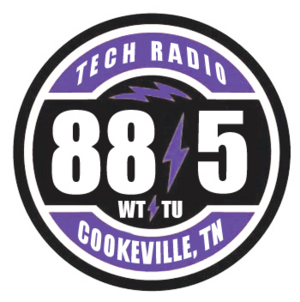
- Cookeville, Tennessee; United States
- Broadcast area: Cookeville, Tennessee
- Frequency: 88.5 MHz
- Branding: Tech Radio — 88.5 The Nest

Programming
- Format: Alternative rock

Ownership
- Owner: Tennessee Technological University

History
- First air date: 1967
- Call sign meaning: W Tennessee Technological University

Technical information
- Licensing authority: FCC
- Facility ID: 65217
- Class: A
- HAAT: 50.0 meters
- Transmitter coordinates: 36°10′36.20″N 85°30′19.90″W

Links
- Public license information: Public file; LMS
- Webcast: WTTU Webcast
- Website: WTTU Website

WTTU (88.5 FM), also referred to as The Nest, is a college radio station licensed to Cookeville, Tennessee, United States. The station, owned by Tennessee Technological University, broadcasts with 2,000 watts of power.

This variety station mainly airs alternative rock, but any shows hosted on WTTU are free to play their own genre of music, so as long as it follows FCC guidelines. All music, news, or sports shows hosted on WTTU are student-produced, which is why the branding of the station includes "Tech Radio". "The Nest" is another nickname for the station, in reference to the golden eagle mascot associated with the athletics program, which has resulted in other bird-adjacent slogans, such as "Rockin' the Nest".
