= WMUW =

Radio station at the Mississippi University for Women in Columbus, Mississippi

- Columbus, Mississippi; United States
- Frequency: 88.5 MHz
- Branding: "88.5 WMUW The Edge"

Programming
- Format: Variety

Ownership
- Owner: Mississippi University for Women

History
- First air date: September 28, 1981

Technical information
- Licensing authority: FCC
- Facility ID: 91984
- Class: A
- ERP: 980 watts
- HAAT: 27 meters (89 ft)
- Transmitter coordinates: 33°29′23″N 88°25′18″W

Links
- Public license information: Public file; LMS
- Webcast: Listen Live
- Website: www.muw.edu/wmuw

WMUW (88.5 FM) is a radio station licensed to serve the community of Columbus, Mississippi. The station is owned by Mississippi University for Women, and airs a variety format.

The station was assigned the WMUW call letters by the Federal Communications Commission on January 16, 2006.

== History ==
WMUW went on the air September 28, 1981, at 11 a.m. The station aired a full-service format featuring jazz, big band, and classical music, along with news programming and syndicated fare from the Longhorn Radio Network of the University of Texas at Austin; it broadcast with an effective radiated power of 980 watts. WMUW operated as part of the Division of Communication of the university after a 1982 schoolwide reorganization. By 1984, it was broadcasting 18 hours a day and known among students as "88-Plus". The station's first license, however, expired; according to the June 11, 1998, letter from the Federal Communications Commission, the action came as a result of WMUW's failure to transmit in twelve straight months, which occurred because the station's tower was down. The university immediately applied for a new construction permit, which was awarded in 2005; the license to cover was awarded in 2008.
