= KPBE =

Brownwood, Texas; United States
- Frequency: 89.3 MHz
- Branding: La Radio Cristiananetwork

Programming
- Format: Defunct (religious broadcasting)

Ownership
- Owner: Paulino Bernal Evangelism

Technical information
- Licensing authority: FCC
- Facility ID: 88313
- Class: A
- ERP: 6,000 watts
- HAAT: 100.0 meters (328.1 ft)
- Transmitter coordinates: 31°47′43.00″N 98°49′7.00″W

Links
- Public license information: Public file; LMS

KPBE (89.3 FM, La Radio Cristiananetwork) was a radio station broadcasting a religious broadcasting music format. Licensed to Brownwood, Texas, United States. The station was last owned by Paulino Bernal Evangelism. Bernal surrendered the license for KPBE and five other stations to the Federal Communications Commission on Nov. 7, 2013.
