= XHUSP-FM =

University radio station in San Luis Potosí, San Luis Potosí, Mexico

- San Luis Potosí, San Luis Potosí; Mexico
- Frequency: 88.5 FM (HD Radio)
- Branding: Radio Universidad

Programming
- Format: University cultural

Ownership
- Owner: Universidad Autónoma de San Luis Potosí
- Sister stations: XEXQ-AM

History
- First air date: January 18, 1992

Technical information
- Licensing authority: CRT
- Class: A
- Power: 3 kW
- HAAT: −9.37 m (−30.7 ft)
- Transmitter coordinates: 22°10′19.5″N 100°57′57.6″W

Links
- Webcast: Listen live
- Website: radioytelevision.uaslp.mx

XHUSP-FM is a radio station in San Luis Potosí, San Luis Potosí. It broadcasts on 88.5 FM and is one of two radio stations owned by the Universidad Autónoma de San Luis Potosí, known as Radio Universidad 88.5 FM.

XHUSP broadcasts in HD.

== History ==
The UASLP, already owner of longtime AM radio station XEXQ-AM, received a permit for an FM radio station in December 1989. The station signed on January 18, 1992.

Some programming, such as the newscast "Reseña 88.5", is shared with XEXQ, but the stations do have separate programming for most of the broadcast day.

In 2016, a third Radio Universidad service, XHUASM-FM 91.9 (5 kW ERP) was authorized to serve Matehuala. The station, known as "Universidad Stereo", entered program service on June 19, 2019. By the end of 2023, this station is called "Radio Universidad, Fusión".
