= KZPI =

Deming, New Mexico; United States
- Frequency: 91.7 MHz

Programming
- Format: Defunct (Spanish)

Ownership
- Owner: Paulino Bernal Evangelism

History
- First air date: 1992

Technical information
- Licensing authority: FCC
- Facility ID: 67626
- Class: A
- ERP: 600 watts
- HAAT: 19 meters (62 ft)
- Transmitter coordinates: 32°15′31″N 107°46′45″W

Links
- Public license information: Public file; LMS

KZPI (91.7 FM) was a radio station broadcasting a Spanish music format. Licensed to Deming, New Mexico, United States, the station was owned by Paulino Bernal Evangelism. KZPI's license was returned to the Federal Communications Commission (FCC) by the licensee on June 21, 2013, and then cancelled by the FCC on June 26, 2013.
