= WHPK =

Radio station in Hyde Park, Chicago

Coordinates: 41.794°N 87.599°W

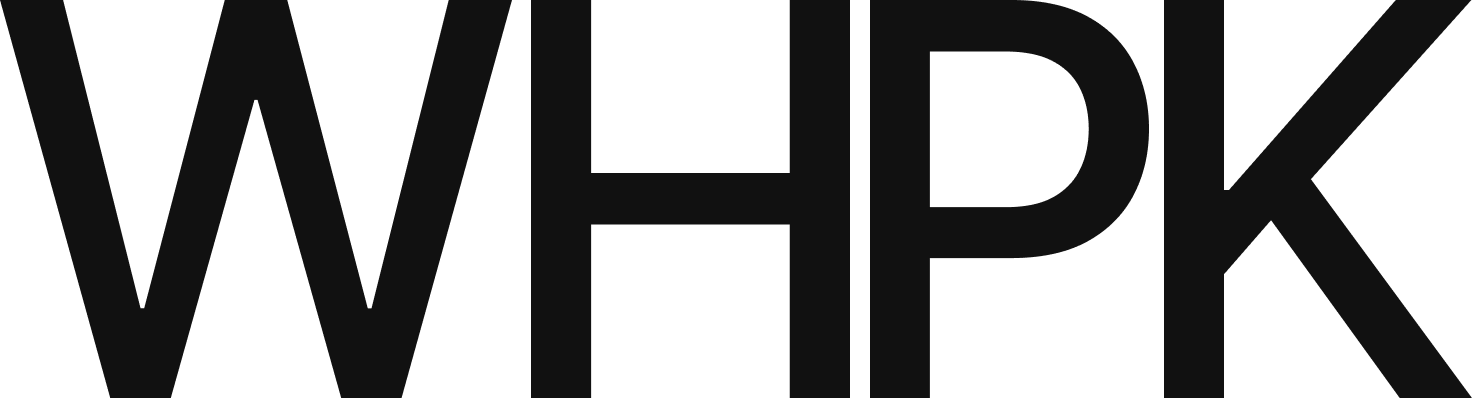
- Chicago, Illinois; United States
- Frequency: 88.5 MHz

Programming
- Format: College radio, community radio

Ownership
- Owner: University of Chicago

History
- First air date: March 22, 1968
- Former call signs: WHPK-FM (1968–2016)
- Former frequencies: 88.3 MHz (1968–1985)
- Call sign meaning: Woodlawn/Hyde Park/Kenwood

Technical information
- Licensing authority: FCC
- Facility ID: 69000
- Class: A
- ERP: 100 watts
- HAAT: 37 m (121 ft)

Links
- Public license information: Public file; LMS
- Website: www.whpk.org

WHPK (88.5 FM) is a student-run college radio station owned by the University of Chicago in Hyde Park on the South Side of Chicago, Illinois.

Established in 1968, the station is and operated by volunteer students and community volunteers. WHPK's station manager and program director are elected by the station's student members and must be students themselves. The station's broadcast engineer is paid by the university.

== History ==
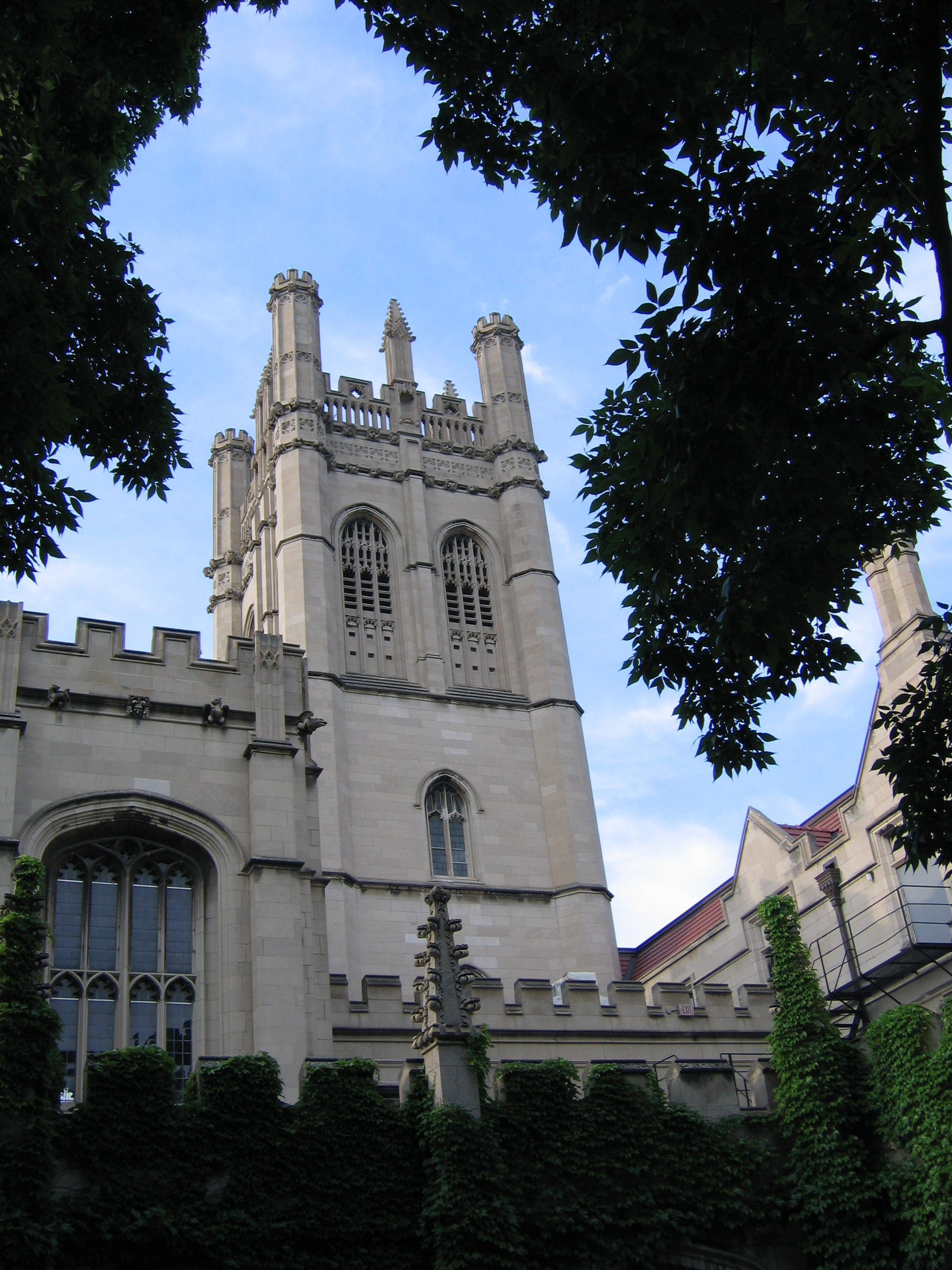
Mitchell Tower, University of Chicago Reynolds Club building where the station's studios are located.

In 1968, WHPK-FM was established when the campus secret Society of the Owl and Serpent disbanded, donating its funds and Reynolds Club office space to a student radio group. WHPK-FM started broadcasting as a 15-watt FM station at 88.3 MHz on March 22, 1968. In 1985, WHPK-FM upgraded to a 100-watt transmitter and moved to the current frequency of 88.5 MHz.

WHPK-FM was the first radio station to broadcast hip hop music in Chicago, and would become home to aspiring rappers throughout the years, including Common and Kanye West.

The station changed its call sign to the current WHPK on February 26, 2016.

== Content ==
Programming blocks are divided into classical, folk, international, jazz, public affairs, rap, rock, and specialty show formats.

=== Notable ===
In 1984, WHPK-FM's first rap show was established by Ken Wissoker. DJ JP Chill has had a rap and hip hop show on WHPK since 1986.

A long-running Saturday night show, The Blues Excursion, is hosted by a widely received radio personality named Arkansas Red.

== Recognition ==
In 2008, WHPK-FM was awarded "Best College Radio Station" by Chicago Reader.

== See also ==
- Campus radio
- List of college radio stations in the United States
- List of community radio stations in the United States
