= KPBM =

McCamey, Texas; United States
- Frequency: 95.3 MHz

Programming
- Language: Spanish
- Format: Defunct (Spanish)

Ownership
- Owner: Paulino Bernal

History
- Last air date: June 26, 2013

Technical information
- Licensing authority: FCC
- Facility ID: 83864
- Class: C3
- ERP: 3,000 watts
- HAAT: 232.0 meters (761.2 ft)
- Transmitter coordinates: 31°12′41.00″N 102°16′28.00″W

Links
- Public license information: Public file; LMS

KPBM (95.3 FM) was an American radio station broadcasting a Spanish music format. Licensed to serve McCamey, Texas, United States, the station was owned by Paulino Bernal. KPBM's license was cancelled on June 26, 2013.
