= XHNB-FM =

Radio station in San Luis Potosí, San Luis Potosí, Mexico

- San Luis Potosí, San Luis Potosí; Mexico
- Frequency: 95.3 FM
- Branding: WAÖH FM

Programming
- Format: Pop in Spanish

Ownership
- Owner: Grupo ACIR (pending sale to Cadena RASA); (Radio XHNB San Luis Potosí, S. de R.L. de C.V.)
- Operator: Cadena RASA
- Sister stations: XHRASA-FM, XHQK-FM

History
- First air date: January 11, 1979 (concession)

Technical information
- Licensing authority: CRT
- Class: B
- ERP: 31.581 kW
- HAAT: −54.25 m (−178.0 ft)

Links
- Webcast: Listen live
- Website: zeno.fm/radio/WAOH_953SLP

XHNB-FM is a radio station on 95.3 FM in San Luis Potosí, San Luis Potosí, Mexico. It is owned by Grupo ACIR, operated by Cadena RASA and carries its Pop in Spanish format.

== History ==
XHNB received its concession on January 11, 1979. It was owned by Carlos de la Peña y Quintero but has always been part of ACIR.

Amor ran on XHNB until May 12, 2026, when Grupo ACIR dropped its formats from the cluster it ran in the market.
