= WKWZ =

Under a "Shared Time" agreement with WPOB Plainview, New York
- Syosset, New York; United States
- Broadcast area: Oyster Bay, New York
- Frequency: 88.5 MHz

Programming
- Format: Variety

Ownership
- Owner: Syosset Central School District

History
- First air date: September 17, 1973

Technical information
- Licensing authority: FCC
- Facility ID: 64351
- Class: A
- ERP: 125 watts
- HAAT: 79 meters (259 ft)
- Transmitter coordinates: 40°47′48″N 73°27′44″W

Links
- Public license information: Public file; LMS
- Webcast: Listen live

WKWZ 88.5 FM is a non-commercial educational high school radio station licensed to serve Syosset, New York. The station is owned and operated by the Syosset Central School District, with studios located at Syosset High School. It broadcasts from 2:30 p.m. to 11:00 pm, offering students an involvement in news-casting, sports-casting, engineering and all aspects of broadcasting. Student training allows them to take the Federal Communication engineering exam which is needed to broadcast on the radio station. WKWZ broadcasts to the town of Oyster Bay, with an effective radiated power (ERP) of 125 watts. The station has been on the air since 1971. WKWZ shares its frequency and shares time with WPOB Plainview NY.

== History ==
From its origin as a pirate FM station broadcasting from studios located in Woodbury, NY, the station was the brainchild of two Syosset High School students, Scott Tillman and Gary Kitzis. After building and running their pirate FM radio station (WPST FM 103.1 MHz -the "Woodbury Plainview Syosset Team" ) from makeshift studios and a converted FM ham radio transmitter, they brought their idea to the then assistant superintendent of the school district, Dr Norman Schwartz. Dr. Schwartz loved the idea and after school board approval a frequency search was conducted by engineering firm Paul Godley Company. Application for a construction permit BPED -1222 was approved by the FCC in January 1971 and WKWZ was issued an educational broadcast license. During the FCC licensing process Plainview - Old Bethpage Schools applied for a license on the same (and only available) frequency. In a meeting with the two students and the assistant superintendent of Syosset schools it was decided to allow Plainview - Old Bethpage schools to share the frequency, but only during school hours as it was thought most listeners would tune in after school hours and less while attending classes. Hence Syosset's WKWZ FM begins its broadcasts at 2:30 pm when classes end and Plainview-Old Bethpage begins its broadcasts earlier in the day ending its broadcasts at about 2:20 pm. The original first class licensee during FCC application was Ron Dagavarian, also a Syosset High School student at the time. Programming at the station really took off in the 1970s and 1980s under the direction of teacher and station advisor, Fred Zodda. At this time WKWZ became a dynamic and thriving organization at Syosset High School. The station broadcast hours expanded: Monday-Friday 2:30 p.m. to 10:00 p.m. & Saturday/Sunday 10:00 a.m. to 10:00 pm. Mr. Zodda allowed students to develop their own shows and format. This resulted in shows that ranged from Top 40 music, news, current events and a variety of cultural shows. Mr. Zodda inspired a cadre of students to craft their shows through "hard work and a clear voice".

== See also ==
- High school radio
- WPOB
