= XEXQ-AM =

University radio station in San Luis Potosí, San Luis Potosí

- San Luis Potosí, San Luis Potosí; Mexico
- Frequency: 1190 kHz (HD Radio)
- Branding: Radio Universidad

Programming
- Format: University cultural

Ownership
- Owner: Universidad Autónoma de San Luis Potosí
- Sister stations: XHUSP-FM

History
- First air date: July 28, 1938
- Former frequencies: 1450 kHz

Technical information
- Licensing authority: CRT
- Class: B
- Power: 25 kWs day 1 kW night
- Transmitter coordinates: 22°10′19.5″N 100°57′57.6″W

Links
- Webcast: XEXQ-AM
- Website: radioytelevision.uaslp.mx

XEXQ-AM is a radio station in San Luis Potosí, San Luis Potosí. It broadcasts on 1190 kHz and is one of two radio stations owned by the Universidad Autónoma de San Luis Potosí, known as Radio Universidad 1190 AM.

XEXQ is the second-oldest university radio station in Mexico, behind Radio UNAM.

== History ==
On July 28, 1938, the UASLP's radio efforts began with the sign-on of XEXQ-AM, the second university broadcaster in Mexico. Only a year prior, XEXX-AM in Mexico City, the station of the Universidad Nacional Autónoma de México. The original station, licensed for 1250 kHz with a power of 50 watts, began formal transmissions the next day with programming from 1 to 3 pm and 6 to 8 pm, Monday through Saturday. The new AM radio station came with a shortwave counterpart, also XEXQ, on 6045 kHz, which by the 1950s was one of 16 shortwave radio stations in Mexico. In 2007, the station moved to 1190 kHz.

Its current power of 25 kW day/1 kW night allows it to reach most population centers in the state, including Matehuala and Rioverde.

In 1989, the university received a permit for an accompanying FM radio station, XHUSP-FM 88.5. The stations share some programming, particularly the "Reseña 88.5" newscast, but often have separate musical and other programs.
