= XHEPO-FM =

Radio station in San Luis Potosí, San Luis Potosí, Mexico

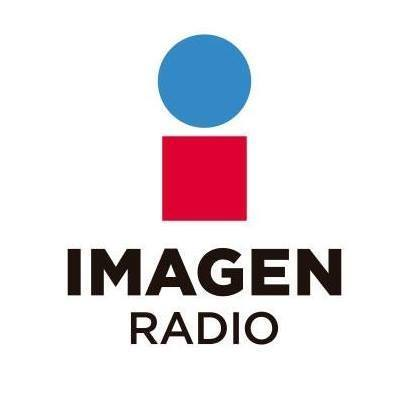
- San Luis Potosí, San Luis Potosí; Mexico
- Frequency: 103.1 MHz
- Branding: Imagen Radio

Programming
- Format: News/talk
- Affiliations: Grupo Imagen

Ownership
- Owner: GlobalMedia; (Cable Master, S.A. de C.V.)
- Sister stations: XHBM-FM, XHEWA-FM, XHOD-FM, XHPM-FM, XHSMR-FM, XHCCBY-FM

History
- First air date: September 2, 1947 (concession)
- Former call signs: XEPO-AM
- Former frequencies: 1310 kHz, 1100 kHz
- Call sign meaning: San Luis POtosí

Technical information
- Licensing authority: CRT
- Class: B1
- ERP: 25,000 watts
- HAAT: −35.8 m (−117 ft)
- Transmitter coordinates: 22°09′03″N 100°58′50.46″W

Links
- Webcast: Listen live
- Website: globalmedia.mx

XHEPO-FM is a radio station located in the city of San Luis Potosí, San Luis Potosí, Mexico. It rebroadcasts the programming of XEDA-FM Imagen Radio 90.5 FM from Mexico City.

== History ==
XEPO-AM on 1310 kHz received its concession on September 2, 1947. It was owned by Ceferino Z. Jiménez, who founded the first station that began operations in San Luis Potosí on XECZ-AM, and broadcast with 1,000 watts. The station later sold the station to Radio Ondas Populares, S.A. By the 1980s, however, it had gone to 500 watts.

In 1987, XEPO moved to 1100 kHz and began broadcasting with 1,000 watts again. The same year, it was sold to Grupo ACIR, with the concession being transferred to Radio Integral in 2000. Formats under ACIR included Radio Ondas Populares (until 1990), Radio Voz (1990–1991), Radio ACIR (1991–1999), Bonita (1999–2003) and Inolvidable (2003–2005).

In 2005, ACIR sold XEPO to Controladora de Medios (now known as GlobalMedia), with the station taking on its Imagen Radio affiliation; Cable Master became the concessionaire in 2006. In November 2010, XEPO moved to FM as XHEPO-FM 103.1; 1100 AM signed off for the final time in January 2015.
