= KGHY =

Coordinates: 30°16′23″N 93°57′23″W

- Beaumont, Texas; United States
- Broadcast area: Beaumont – Port Arthur metropolitan area
- Frequency: 88.5 MHz
- Branding: KGHY 88.5 FM

Programming
- Language: English
- Format: Southern Gospel

Ownership
- Owner: CCS Radio, Inc.

Technical information
- Licensing authority: FCC
- Facility ID: 91638
- Class: C3
- ERP: 13,500 watts
- HAAT: 105 meters (344 ft)
- Translators: 96.5 W243EQ (Lake Charles, LA); 105.5 K288FY (Livingston)

Links
- Public license information: Public file; LMS
- Webcast: Listen live
- Website: kghy.org

KGHY (88.5 FM) is a radio station airing a Southern gospel format in Beaumont, Texas, United States, broadcasting on 88.5 FM. The station serves the Beaumont – Port Arthur - Orange metropolitan area and southwestern Louisiana. KGHY is owned by CCS Radio, Inc.

== Translators ==
KGHY relays its programming on two additional translators, W243EQ Lake Charles, and K288FY Livingston, Texas, extending the overall KGHY coverage area into areas north of the main signal.

Broadcast translators for KGHY
Call sign	Frequency	City of license	FID	ERP (W)	HAAT	Class	FCC info
W243EQ	96.5 FM	Lake Charles, Louisiana	147252	250	11 m (36 ft)	D	LMS
K288FY	105.5 FM	Livingston, Texas	153411	75	146.3 m (480 ft)	D	LMS
