= XHCV-FM =

Radio station in Ciudad Valles, San Luis Potosí, Mexicoi

- Ciudad Valles, San Luis Potosí; Mexico
- Frequency: 98.1 FM
- Branding: La Gran Compañía

Ownership
- Owner: Grupo Radiofónico Quilas; (René Castro Echeverría)
- Sister stations: XHXR-FM

History
- First air date: June 2, 1956
- Former frequencies: 610 AM (1956–1994); 600 AM (1994–2011)
- Call sign meaning: Ciudad Valles

Technical information
- Licensing authority: CRT
- Class: B1
- ERP: 25 kW
- HAAT: −69.7 m (−229 ft)
- Transmitter coordinates: 21°58′23.96″N 99°00′17.43″W

Links
- Website: radioxhcv.com

XHCV-FM is a radio station on 98.1 FM in Ciudad Valles, San Luis Potosí, Mexico. It is known as La Gran Compañía.

== History ==
Program testing for XECV-AM 610 began in August 1955, but an unexpected meteorological event put a halt to the station's plans. Hurricane Hilda slammed into the Huasteca region and made landfall near Tampico, and the station's tower was a casualty of the high winds. The station, initially known as "Radio Tropical", finally received its concession on May 12, 1956 and began normal service on June 2 of that year. It operated with 1,000 watts day and 250 night. The station changed its name in the 1970s to "La V de Valles", though the current slogan and name were instituted in 1980.

On May 14, 1994, XECV's tower was blown down again. Soon after the station returned on August 19 of that year, it moved to 600 kHz so it could boost its power to 5 kW day and 1 kW night.

XECV received approval to migrate to FM in February 2011 and began broadcasting on its new frequency on March 20.

On December 18, 2017, the IFT approved the transfer of the XHCV concession from its original holder, Rafael Castro Torres, to René Castro Echeverría.
