= XHSNP-FM =

Radio station in San Luis Potosí, San Luis Potosí, Mexico

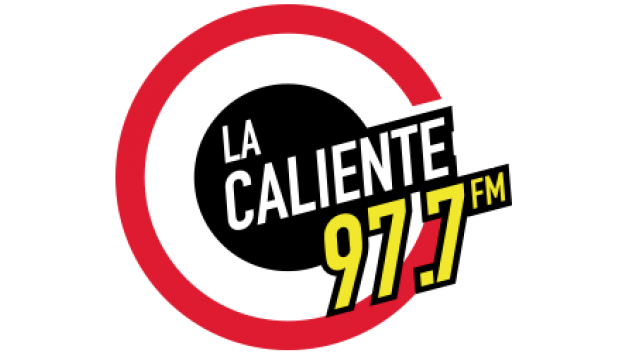
- San Luis Potosí, San Luis Potosí; Mexico
- Frequency: 97.7 MHz
- Branding: La Caliente

Programming
- Format: Grupera

Ownership
- Owner: Multimedios Radio; (Multimedios Radio, S.A. de C.V.)
- Sister stations: XHCZ-FM

History
- First air date: November 1, 1992 (concession)
- Former frequencies: 93.7 MHz (1992–1997)
- Call sign meaning: "San Luis Potosí"

Technical information
- Licensing authority: CRT
- Class: C1
- ERP: 80 kW
- HAAT: −67.45 m (−221.3 ft)

Links
- Webcast: Listen live
- Website: www.lamusica.com/en/stations/xhsnp

XHSNP-FM is a radio station on 97.7 FM in San Luis Potosí, San Luis Potosí, Mexico. It is owned by Multimedios Radio and carries its La Caliente grupera format.

== History ==
XHSNP received its concession on November 1, 1992. It was owned by Multimedios subsidiary Enlaces Audiovisuales, S.A. de C.V. and broadcast with 3 kW on 93.7 MHz, carrying a romantic format known as Estéreo Recuerdo. During this time, Multimedios operated XEWA-AM 540 as "Súper Estelar"; when 540 AM lost the format, Multimedios brought it to XHSNP.

In June 1997, XHSNP moved to 97.7, which allowed it a power increase to 50 kW. Since then, the station has increased to an effective radiated power of 80 kW.
