= XHXR-FM =

Radio station in Ciudad Valles, San Luis Potosí, Mexico

- Ciudad Valles, San Luis Potosí; Mexico
- Frequency: 100.5 FM
- Branding: La Mensajera

Programming
- Format: Regional Mexican

Ownership
- Owner: Grupo Radiofónico Quilas; (Impulsora Radiofónica, S.A.)
- Sister stations: XHCV-FM

History
- First air date: May 5, 1968 (concession)
- Former call signs: XEXR-AM (1968-2015)
- Former frequencies: 1260 AM (1968-2015), 106.9 FM (2011-2018)

Technical information
- Licensing authority: CRT
- Class: B1
- ERP: 25 kW
- HAAT: −69.7 m (−229 ft)
- Transmitter coordinates: 21°58′23.96″N 99°00′17.43″W

Links
- Website: www.radiomensajera.com

XHXR-FM is a radio station on 100.5 FM in Ciudad Valles, San Luis Potosí, Mexico. It is known as La Mensajera carries a Regional Mexican format.

== History ==
XEXR-AM 1260 received its concession on May 5, 1968. It operated with 1,000 watts.

XEXR received approval to migrate to FM on 106.9 FM in February 2011. The station moved to 100.5 on July 5, 2018; the frequency change was a condition of its concession renewal and clears the 106-108 MHz sub-band for community and indigenous radio stations.
