= XHSS-FM =

Radio station in San Luis Potosí, San Luis Potosí, Mexico

- San Luis Potosí, San Luis Potosí; Mexico
- Frequency: 91.9 MHz
- Branding: La Poderosa

Programming
- Format: Regional Mexican

Ownership
- Owner: Grupo Radiorama; (XHSS-FM, S.A. de C.V.)
- Operator: Grupo AS Comunicación
- Sister stations: XHEI-FM

History
- First air date: November 28, 1988 (concession)
- Call sign meaning: San LuiS

Technical information
- Licensing authority: CRT
- Class: B1
- ERP: 13.42 kW
- HAAT: 13.8 m (45 ft)
- Transmitter coordinates: 22°12′47″N 101°01′39″W

Links
- Website: www.grupoasradio.com

XHSS-FM is a radio station on 91.9 FM in San Luis Potosí, San Luis Potosí. It is owned by Grupo Radiorama and carries a Regional Mexican format known as La Poderosa.

== History ==
XHSS received its concession on November 28, 1988. It was owned by Grupo Radiorama through subsidiary Voz y Música, S.A., but was regularly farmed out to other radio groups.

In 2002, MG Radio began operating the station with Romance, a Spanish-language adult hits format. In January 2006, Radio S.A. tried its hand at running XHSS, placing its Máxima pop music format on the station. MG Radio returned to XHSS in January 2008, restoring the Romance name and format; on September 19, 2010, that format was moved to XESL-AM 1340 as Radiorama retook control of XHSS.

The first format on the station after Radiorama took control was Xtrema, a pop music format. On March 1, 2016, XHSS picked up the La Poderosa Regional Mexican format.
