= KRLF =

- Pullman, Washington; United States
- Broadcast area: Pullman-Moscow
- Frequency: 88.5 MHz
- Branding: Alive 88.5

Programming
- Format: Contemporary Christian
- Affiliations: Salem Communications

Ownership
- Owner: Living Faith Fellowship Educational Ministries

Technical information
- Licensing authority: FCC
- Facility ID: 37807
- Class: A
- ERP: 400 watts
- HAAT: 246 meters
- Transmitter coordinates: 46°38′1.00″N 117°5′13.00″W

Links
- Public license information: Public file; LMS
- Website: krlf.org

KRLF (88.5 FM) is a radio station broadcasting a Contemporary Christian format. Licensed to Pullman, Washington, United States, the station serves the Pullman-Moscow area. The station is currently owned by Living Faith Fellowship Educational Ministries, under a non-commercial educational license, and features programming from Salem Communications.
