= WSFI =

- Antioch, Illinois; United States
- Broadcast area: Waukegan, Illinois
- Frequency: 88.5 MHz
- Branding: WSFI Catholic Radio 88.5 FM

Programming
- Format: Catholic

Ownership
- Owner: BVM Helping Hands

History
- First air date: 2014

Technical information
- Licensing authority: FCC
- Facility ID: 175700
- Class: B1
- ERP: 6,100 watts
- HAAT: 115.3 meters (378 ft)
- Transmitter coordinates: 42°28′48.9″N 88°11′41.7″W

Links
- Public license information: Public file; LMS
- Webcast: Listen live
- Website: wsficatholicradio.org

WSFI (88.5 FM) is a radio station licensed to serve the community of Antioch, Illinois. The station is owned by BVM Helping Hands, and airs a Catholic radio format.

The station was assigned the WSFI call letters by the Federal Communications Commission on December 17, 2010.

WSFI briefly had airtime on AM 750 WNDZ from 2021 until 2024. On July 16, 2025, BVM Helping Hands purchased 88.7 WCHQ in Indian Creek, which had been broadcasting an alternative/Christian rock format, from the Call Communications Group for $300,000. On September 16, 2025, the callsign for 88.7 changed to WSFV.
