= XHTL-FM (San Luis Potosí) =

Radio station in San Luis Potosí, San Luis Potosí

- San Luis Potosí, San Luis Potosí; Mexico
- Frequency: 99.3 MHz
- Branding: Más FM

Programming
- Language: English
- Format: Adult Contemporary

Ownership
- Owner: Manuel González Díaz de León and Aura Elena del Villar Martínez; (Estereo San Luis, S.A. de C.V.)
- Operator: MG Radio
- Sister stations: XHOB-FM, XHWZ-FM, XHESL-FM, XHCSM-FM

History
- First air date: February 15, 1973 (concession)
- Call sign meaning: Alfonso Torre López, original concessionaire

Technical information
- Licensing authority: CRT
- Class: A
- ERP: 1,886 watts
- HAAT: −54.7 m (−179 ft)

Links
- Website: https://mgnoticias.mx/musica-de-los-70-80-y-90s/

XHTL-FM is a radio station in San Luis Potosí, San Luis Potosí. Broadcasting on 99.3 FM, XHTL is operated by MG Radio and carries its Adult contemporary music in English format of Más FM.

== History ==
Alfonso Torre López received the concession for XHTL on February 15, 1973.

The station was long leased by Grupo ACIR, outright owner of the city's XHQK-FM 98.5. On February 26, 2020, the Mix and La Comadre formats swapped frequencies in San Luis, with Mix going to XHQK.

In November 2021, ACIR opted to end its lease of XHQK-FM. The station dropped all La Comadre branding. A month later, the station changed music from Regional Mexican to music in English and Spanish from the 1980s, 1990s, and 2000s, as MG Radio took over operations. The station began branding as Más FM on January 7, 2022, using a brand previously used on MG's XHWZ-FM 90.9 between 2013 and 2016.
