= KMFM (Texas) =

Radio station in Premont, Texas (1986–2013)

Premont, Texas; United States
- Frequency: 100.7 MHz

Programming
- Format: Defunct

Ownership
- Owner: Paulino Bernal

History
- First air date: 1986
- Last air date: November 7, 2013

Technical information
- Licensing authority: FCC
- Facility ID: 51958
- Class: C3
- ERP: 25,000 watts
- HAAT: 87.0 meters (285.4 ft)
- Transmitter coordinates: 27°28′30″N 98°3′23″W

Links
- Public license information: Public file; LMS

KMFM (100.7 FM) was a radio station licensed to Premont, Texas, United States. The station was last owned by Paulino Bernal. Bernal surrendered the license for KMFM and five other stations to the Federal Communications Commission on November 7, 2013.
