= XHEWA-FM =

Radio station in San Luis Potosí, Mexico

XHEWA-FM / XEWA-AM
- San Luis Potosí, San Luis Potosí; Mexico
- Frequency: 103.9 FM / 540 AM
- Branding: Los 40

Programming
- Format: Spanish & English Top 40 (CHR)

Ownership
- Owner: Radiópolis; (Cadena Radiodifusora Mexicana, S.A. de C.V.)
- Operator: GlobalMedia
- Sister stations: XHBM-FM, XHEPO-FM, XHOD-FM, XHPM-FM, XHSMR-FM, XHCCBY-FM

History
- First air date: 1950 (AM); 2011 (FM)
- Call sign meaning: XEW A (H added in AM-FM migration)

Technical information
- Licensing authority: CRT
- Class: A (AM); B1 (FM)
- Power: AM: 150,000 watts
- ERP: FM: 25,000 watts
- HAAT: FM: 45.56 meters (149.5 ft)
- Transmitter coordinates: 22°09′28.6″N 100°55′34.5″W

Links
- Webcast: Listen live
- Website: globalmedia.mx/Los40

XHEWA-FM/XEWA-AM are commercial radio stations in San Luis Potosí, San Luis Potosí, Mexico. XEWA broadcasts on 540 AM and is a Class A station. Its transmitter is in Soledad de Graciano Sánchez. XEWA is one of the highest powered radio stations in North America, broadcasting at 150,000 watts, using a directional antenna by day and a non-directional antenna at night. 540 AM is a Mexican and Canadian clear-channel frequency.

XHEWA broadcasts on 103.9 FM, with an effective radiated power (ERP) of 25,000 watts. Its tower is also in Soledad de Graciano Sánchez. The two stations are owned by Radiópolis. They carry a Top 40 (CHR) radio format, playing both Spanish and English language hits, known as "Los 40."

== History ==
XEWA received its concession on December 2, 1948, one of a string of repeaters of XEW-AM 900 Mexico City authorized in the late 1940s. XEWA began operations on the frequency of 540 kHz with 150,000 watts of power — still its current levels, making it the most powerful AM radio station in the country.

In May 1961, a second XEWA-AM was licensed to operate in Monterrey, Nuevo León, in order to provide daytime XEW service and an improved nighttime signal there. It operates with 1,500 watts during the day and 1,000 watts night.

On March 16, 1988, XEWA struck out on its own with a grupera format known as Súper Estelar WA. Broadcasting from Monterrey, Súper Estelar was programmed by Multimedios Estrellas de Oro and served as one of Mexico's pioneering grupera stations. After five years, Súper Estelar left XEWA and migrated to XHSNP-FM 93.7 (later 97.7) in San Luis Potosí, which was owned directly by Multimedios; it was also carried on some Multimedios radio stations in other cities until the format became known as La Caliente.

The end of Súper Estelar made way for a flip to the Ke Buena format from Radiópolis, which lasted until 1998 when the station began repeating XEW again, now known as "Cadena W Azul y Plata" and later as "W Radio". In 2003, Radiorama began managing the station for Televisa Radio.

In July 2009, saw the first ever split between XEWA Monterrey and XEWA San Luis Potosí. The San Luis Potosí station was transferred to local radio company MG Radio, while XEWA Monterrey began offering a Nuevo León-specific version of W Radio; ever since, XEWA Monterrey, now on FM as XHWAG-FM, has been a separately programmed station which is currently operated directly by Televisa Radio.

In San Luis, XHEWA-FM 103.9 was authorized in 2011 and came on the air that July; while it is technically an AM-FM migrant, the AM station cannot be shut off until radio service is available in the entirety of its coverage area, including ten municipalities in five states with no other radio service. In 2012, Radiorama returned to manage XEWA/XHEWA, and in July, W Radio was replaced with Los 40 Principales. Radiorama's regional affiliate in Tampico, Grupo AS, took over the San Luis Potosí region in 2016 and operated it until December 31 of that year. On January 9, 2017, GlobalMedia, which also had begun programming Ke Buena in San Luis Potosí on XHBM-FM 105.7, took over operations of XHEWA after the station spent several days directly relaying XEX-FM Mexico City.

== Coverage ==
XEWA-AM is the dominant clear-channel station at 540 AM, powered at 150 kilowatts to cover the Mexican states of San Luis Potosí, Nuevo León, Tamaulipas, Coahuila, Zacatecas, Querétaro, Guanajuato and Aguascalientes. The station also has nighttime coverage throughout most of Mexico, as well as the neighboring American states of Texas and New Mexico.
