= XHOB-FM =

Radio station in San Luis Potosí, San Luis Potosí

- San Luis Potosí, San Luis Potosí; Mexico
- Frequency: 96.1 MHz
- Branding: Factor 96.1

Programming
- Format: Pop

Ownership
- Owner: MG Radio; (Radiocomunicación Enfocada, S.A. de C.V.)
- Sister stations: XHTL-FM, XHWZ-FM, XHESL-FM, XHCSM-FM

History
- First air date: September 20, 1971 (concession)
- Call sign meaning: Orozco Barba, last name of original concessionaire

Technical information
- Licensing authority: CRT
- Class: B1
- ERP: 25 kW
- HAAT: −52.6 m (−173 ft)
- Transmitter coordinates: 22°08′25″N 100°59′53″W

Links
- Website: www.factor961.fm

XHOB-FM is a radio station on 96.1 FM in San Luis Potosí, San Luis Potosí. It is owned by MG Radio and is known as Factor 96.1 with a pop format.

== History ==
XHOB received its concession on September 20, 1971. It was owned by Benjamin Orozco Barba. Centri Radio acquired it in 1982, and Radiocomunicación Enfocada picked it up in 1992.
