= XHPM-FM =

Radio station in San Luis Potosí, San Luis Potosí, Mexico

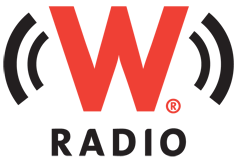
- San Luis Potosí, San Luis Potosí; Mexico
- Frequency: 100.1 MHz
- Branding: W Radio

Programming
- Format: News/talk
- Affiliations: Radiópolis

Ownership
- Owner: GlobalMedia; (Radio Operadora Pegasso, S.A. de C.V.)
- Sister stations: XHBM-FM, XHEPO-FM, XHEWA-FM, XHOD-FM, XHSMR-FM, XHCCBY-FM

History
- First air date: August 1, 1977

Technical information
- Licensing authority: CRT
- Class: B
- ERP: 41,890 watts
- HAAT: −82.8 m (−272 ft)
- Transmitter coordinates: 22°08′41.78″N 100°57′24.83″W

Links
- Webcast: Listen live
- Website: globalmedia.mx

XHPM-FM is a radio station on 100.1 FM located in the city of San Luis Potosí, San Luis Potosí, Mexico. It is owned by GlobalMedia and affiliated with W Radio.

== History ==
XHPM came to the air on August 1, 1977, though it received its concession a year later, on August 25, 1978. It was owned by MVS Radio founder Joaquín Vargas Gómez and carried MVS's Stereorey format for 25 years. In 1990, XHPM was sold to Centro de Frecuencia Modulada. On September 2, 2002, the Stereorey format was replaced nationwide with Best FM, offering a newer music mix. XHPM was the last Best FM station until, like most others, it was converted to the La Mejor grupera format on March 12, 2007.

In late 2009 saw an alliance between Controladora de Medios, a local company, and MVS to produce GlobalMedia. GlobalMedia restored the Stereorey name and format on November 2, 2009—the only city where this had happened. On January 9, 2012, XHPM kept the format but changed its name to FM Globo, which did not originally have this format, and then in June 1, XHPM took on the unique "Hundred FM" name.

On January 16, 2017, XHPM changed its name to "WFM" and picked up W Radio talk programs. The station fully branded as W Radio in May 2020.
