= KDPI (FM) =

- Ketchum, Idaho; United States
- Broadcast area: Wood River Valley
- Frequency: 88.5 MHz
- Branding: KDPI Drop-In Radio

Programming
- Format: Variety

Ownership
- Owner: KDPI Drop-In Radio, Inc.

Technical information
- Licensing authority: FCC
- Facility ID: 172637
- Class: A
- ERP: 105 watts
- HAAT: 638 metres (2,093 ft)
- Transmitter coordinates: 43°39′41″N 114°24′7″W

Links
- Public license information: Public file; LMS
- Webcast: Listen Live
- Website: Official Website

KDPI (88.5 FM) is a radio station licensed to serve the community of Ketchum, Idaho, broadcasting to the Wood River Valley. The station is owned by KDPI Drop-In Radio, Inc. It airs a variety radio format.

The station was assigned the KDPI call letters by the Federal Communications Commission on May 10, 2011.
