= XHBM-FM =

Radio station in San Luis Potosí, San Luis Potosí, Mexico

XHBM-FM / XEBM-AM
- San Luis Potosí, San Luis Potosí; Mexico
- Frequencies: 820 kHz; 105.7 MHz
- Branding: Ke Buena

Programming
- Format: Grupera
- Affiliations: Radiópolis

Ownership
- Owner: GlobalMedia; (Transmisiones Mik, S.A. de C.V.)
- Sister stations: XHSMR-FM, XHOD-FM, XHPM-FM, XHEPO-FM, XHEWA-FM, XHCCBY-FM

History
- First air date: March 6, 1940; 1994 (FM)
- Call sign meaning: Benjamín Briones Muñoz

Technical information
- Licensing authority: CRT
- Class: B1 (FM); B (AM)
- Power: 10 kW day/1 kW night
- ERP: 10 kW
- HAAT: −6.3 m (−21 ft)
- Transmitter coordinates: 22°09′24.3″N 100°56′32.1″W (AM) 22°08′41.2″N 100°57′24.4″W (FM)

Links
- Website: globalmedia.mx/kebuena

XHBM-FM 105.7/XEBM-AM 820 is a combo radio station in San Luis Potosí, San Luis Potosí, Mexico. It carries the national Ke Buena grupera format from Radiópolis.

== History ==
Logo as "Poder 105.7" used until 2016

XEBM received its first concession in March 1940. It was owned by Benjamín Briones Muñoz and broadcast at 1260 kHz. By the 1960s it had moved to 920, and in 1994 it became an AM-FM combo. In 2003, the AM station had moved to 820.

820 AM is a United States clear-channel frequency, on which WBAP in Dallas, Texas and KCBF in Fairbanks, Alaska are the dominant Class A stations.

The station was owned by Organización Editorial Tangamanga until being sold to Controladora de Medios (now GlobalMedia). From 2005 until August 31, 2013, the station was known as La Mera Mera, and between September 1, 2013 until August 1, 2016, it was known as Poder 105.7 before picking up the Ke Buena national format.
