= XHCZ-FM =

Radio station in San Luis Potosí, San Luis Potosí, Mexico

- San Luis Potosí, San Luis Potosí; Mexico
- Frequency: 104.9 MHz
- Branding: La Lupe

Programming
- Format: Variety hits

Ownership
- Owner: Multimedios Radio; (Radio Informativa, S.A. de C.V.)
- Sister stations: XHSNP-FM

History
- First air date: 1934 (AM); April 5, 2012 (FM)
- Former call signs: XECZ-AM (1934–2015)
- Former frequencies: 1430 kHz, 960 kHz (until 2015)

Technical information
- Licensing authority: CRT
- Class: B1
- ERP: 25,000 watts
- HAAT: 53.1 m (174 ft)
- Transmitter coordinates: 22°08′17.83″N 101°01′19.13″W

Links
- Webcast: Listen live
- Website: mmradio.com

XHCZ-FM is a radio station on 104.9 FM in San Luis Potosí, San Luis Potosí, Mexico. It is owned by Multimedios Radio, which programs the station with its La Lupe Spanish variety hits format.

== History ==
Final logo as ABC Radio

XECZ-AM began operations in 1934 and received its full concession in 1944, it is the first radio station to begin operations in San Luis Potosí. It was owned by Zeferino Zaragoza Jiménez and broadcast on 1430 kHz, soon moving to 960. In 1950 ownership passed to Radiodifusoras Mexicanas, S.A., and in 1999, Radiodifusoras Mexicanas, then owned by GAPE, sold to OEM.

In 2011, XECZ was selected to migrate to FM and XHCZ-FM 104.9 begin operations on April 5, 2012.

On December 1, 2020, ABC Radio ceased operations in San Luis Potosí and Multimedios Radio began operating the station with the "La Lupe" Spanish adult hits format. The concession transfer was announced by Federal Telecommunications Institute on August 18, 2021, and then approved the relocation of XHCZ from its city center site to the tower also used by Multimedios station XHSNP-FM.
