= KCLR (AM) =

Ralls, Texas; United States
- Broadcast area: Lubbock metropolitan area
- Frequency: 1530 kHz
- Branding: La Nueva Radio Cristiana

Programming
- Language: Spanish
- Format: Christian radio

Ownership
- Owner: Paulino Bernal Evangelism

History
- First air date: 1963
- Last air date: November 2013

Technical information
- Class: D
- Power: 5,000 watts (Daytime); 1,000 watts (Critical hours)
- Transmitter coordinates: 33°40′0″N 101°22′44″W

KCLR (branded as La Nueva Radio Cristiana) was a radio station in Ralls, Texas, serving the Lubbock metropolitan area with a Spanish language Christian talk radio format. The station broadcast on AM frequency 1530 kHz and was last under the ownership of Paulino Bernal Evangelism.

== History ==
The station was founded in 1963 by Phil Crenshaw and Gaylon O. Gilbert. The original power of that station was 1,000 watts, with power being raised to 5,000 watts non-critical hours (two hours after sunrise and two hours before sunset) in 1968. Because it shared the same frequency as clear-channel station WCKY in Cincinnati, Ohio, KCLR operated only during the daytime hours. The station sought the letters KCLR, for "K-Clear", because of its placement on a clear channel.

The original owners sold the station to F.T. Wilson in 1969, who then sold the station to Pete C. Rodriguez in 1978. Rodriguez himself later sold the station to Paulino Bernal, in 1990. Bernal surrendered the license for KCLR and five other stations to the Federal Communications Commission on November 7, 2013.
