= List of radio stations in Guerrero =

This is a list of radio stations in the Mexican state of Guerrero, which can be sorted by their call signs, frequencies, location, ownership, names, and programming formats.

Radio stations in Guerrero
Call sign	Frequency	Location	Owner	Name	Format
XEBB-AM	600 AM	Acapulco	Radio XHBB, S. de R.L. de C.V.	W Radio	News/talk
XEMAR-AM	710 AM	Acapulco	Radio Paraíso, S. de R.L. de C.V.	Ke Buena	Regional Mexican
XEACEP-AM	750 AM	Acapulco	Escápate al Paraíso, S.A. de C.V.	—N/a	—N/a
XEXY-AM	780 AM	Ciudad Altamirano	Sucesión de Rafael Garcia Vergara	XEXY, La Poderosa Voz del Balsas	
XEZV-AM	800 AM	Tlapa de Comonfort	Instituto Nacional de los Pueblos Indígenas	La Voz de las Montañas	Indigenous radio
XEAGR-AM	810 AM	Acapulco	Transmisora Regional Radio Fórmula, S.A. de C.V.	Radio Fórmula	News/talk
XECPCG-AM	820 AM	Coyuca de Catalán	Gobierno del Estado de Guerrero	RTG Coyuca de Catalán	Public radio
XECPCH-AM	870 AM	Chilpancingo	Gobierno del Estado de Guerrero	RTG Chilpancingo	Public radio
XECPOG-AM	1100 AM	Ometepec	Gobierno del Estado de Guerrero	RTG Ometepec	Public radio
XECPTG-AM	1310 AM	Taxco de Alarcón	Gobierno del Estado de Guerrero	RTG Taxco	Public radio
XEIGEP-AM	1360 AM	Iguala	Escápate al Paraíso, S.A. de C.V.	—N/a	—N/a
XERY-AM	1450 AM	Arcelia	Rafael García Tapia	XERY, La Poderosa Voz del Sur	
XHCPEY-FM	88.3 FM	Zumpango del Río	Gobierno del Estado de Guerrero	—N/a	—N/a
XHKOK-FM	88.9 FM	Acapulco	XEKOK Medio Radial del Pacífico, S.A. de C.V.	Radio de la Costa	Regional Mexican
XHCSHF-FM	89.3 FM	Chilpancingo	Fundación Educacional de Medios, A.C.	—N/a	—N/a
XHKJ-FM	89.7 FM	Acapulco	Radio Mar, S.A.	Vida	Spanish adult contemporary
XHKF-FM	90.5 FM	Iguala	Grupo Radiodigital Siglo XXI, S.A. de C.V.	La Z	Regional Mexican
XHZIH-FM	90.5 FM	Zihuatanejo	Multiestereofonica, S.A. de C.V.	Estéreo Vida	
XHSCBP-FM	91.9 FM	Ciudad Altamirano	Altamiradio Comunicaciones, A.C.	Altamiradio	Community radio
XHACD-FM	92.1 FM	Acapulco	Radio Mundo de Acapulco, S.A.	Voces 92.1	News/talk
XHCPEX-FM	92.1 FM	Zihuatanejo	Gobierno del Estado de Guerrero	RTG Radio	Public radio
XHCPCF-FM	92.3 FM	Tlapa de Comonfort	Instituto Nacional de los Pueblos Indígenas	—N/a	—N/a
XHPCHI-FM	92.5 FM	Chilpancingo	Centrado Corporativo, S.A. de C.V.	Arre en Acustik	Regional Mexican
XHTXO-FM	92.9 FM	Taxco	Radio Cañón, S.A. de C.V.	Los 40	Regional Mexican
XHCCAZ-FM	93.1 FM	Zirándaro de los Chávez	Héctor Romero Arellano	La Rancherita	Regional Mexican
XHCPDT-FM	93.3 FM	Acapulco	Sistema Público de Radiodifusión del Estado Mexicano	—N/a	—N/a
XHPA-FM	93.7 FM	Acapulco	Radio Concierto Acapulco, S.A. de C.V.	La Más Picuda	Regional Mexican
XHIGA-FM	93.9 FM	Iguala	Radio Cañón, S.A. de C.V.	Ke Buena	Regional Mexican
XHCSAB-FM	94.1 FM	Acapulco	Instituto Michoacano de Radiodifusión, A.C.	Heraldo Radio	News/talk
XHNU-FM	94.5 FM	Acapulco	XHNU-FM, S.A.	Súper	Contemporary hit radio
XHLI-FM	94.7 FM	Chilpancingo	Voz del Sur, S.A.	Heraldo Radio	News/talk
XHEVP-FM	95.3 FM	Acapulco	XEVP-AM, S.A. de C.V.	La Bestia Grupera	Regional Mexican
XHJR-FM	95.3 FM	San Jeronimito	XHJR-FM, S.A. de C.V.	La Mera Mera	Regional Mexican
XHRCB-FM	95.3 FM	Taxco de Alarcón, Iguala y Buenavista de Cuéllar	RCBC Comunicación, A.C.	RCBC Radio	Community radio
XHCSHE-FM	95.7 FM	Acapulco	Michoacán Te Escucha, A.C.	—N/a	—N/a
XHSCDO-FM	95.9 FM	Zumpango del Río	RCZCh, A.C.	Radio Tzompantzin	Community radio
XHACA-FM	96.1 FM	Acapulco	Transmisora Regional Radio Fórmula, S.A. de C.V.	Radio Fórmula	News/talk
XHXC-FM	96.1 FM	Taxco	Radio Cañón, S.A. de C.V.	Ke Buena	Regional Mexican
XHCSDK-FM	96.5 FM	Acapulco	RYTSM, A.C.	—N/a	—N/a
XHRLF-FM	96.7 FM	Mezcala, Carrizalillo y Mazapa	Radio la Filosita, A.C.	La Filosita	Mining
XHNS-FM	96.9 FM	Acapulco	Estéreo Ritmo, S.A. de C.V.	Radio Guerrero	News/talk
XHCHH-FM	97.1 FM	Zumpango del Río	Radiodifusoras Capital, S.A. de C.V.	Lokura FM Grupera	Regional Mexican
XHSIAC-FM	97.5 FM	Xalitla	Comunidad Indígena de Xalitla, Guerrero	Radio Xalitla, La Voz del Alto Balsas	Community radio
XHCPES-FM	97.7 FM	Acapulco	Gobierno del Estado de Guerrero	RTG Radio	Public radio
XHCSBJ-FM	97.7 FM	Ixtapa Zihuatanejo	Radio Lacustre, A.C.	—N/a	—N/a
XHPCPG-FM	98.1 FM	Chilpancingo	Imagen Radio Comercial, S.A. de C.V.	Imagen Radio	News/talk
XHMAR-FM	98.5 FM	Acapulco	Radio Paraíso, S. de R.L. de C.V.	Ke Buena	Regional Mexican
XHZHO-FM	98.5 FM	Zihuatanejo	Pegaso Radiocomunicaciones, S.A. de C.V.	Globo 98.5	Spanish adult contemporary
XHNQ-FM	99.3 FM	Acapulco	Stereorey México, S.A.	Exa FM	Contemporary hit radio
XHEPI-FM	99.7 FM	Tixtla Guerrero	Frecuencia Amiga, S.A. de C.V.	La Bestia Grupera	Regional Mexican
XHSE-FM	100.1 FM	Acapulco	Stereorey México, S.A.	La Mejor	Regional Mexican
XHDOM-FM	100.9 FM	Iguala de la Independencia	Domi Bello de Tenorio, A.C.	Iguala Radio	Community radio
XHBB-FM	101.5 FM	Acapulco	Radio XHBB, S. de R.L. de C.V.	W Radio	News/talk
XHCPEV-FM	101.9 FM	Chilpancingo	Universidad Autónoma de Guerrero	Radio UAGro	University radio
XHSCMC-FM	101.9 FM	Ixcateopan de Cuauhtémoc	La Voz de Ixcateopan Radio, A.C.	La Voz de Ixcateopan	Community radio
XHUQ-FM	101.9 FM	Zihuatanejo	Jonathan Morales Moreno	Variedades FM	
XHAGE-FM	102.3 FM	Acapulco	Radio XHAGE Acapulco, S. de R.L. de C.V.	Los 40	Contemporary hit radio
XHCCAY-FM	102.3 FM	La Unión	Héctor Romero Arellano	La Rancherita	Regional Mexican
XHCHG-FM	102.7 FM	Chilpancingo	XECHG-AM, S.A. de C.V.	Súper	Contemporary hit radio
XHAGS-FM	103.1 FM	Acapulco	Radio XEAGS, S.A. de C.V.	Estéreo Pop	Contemporary hit radio
XHSCDN-FM	103.1 FM	Copalillo	La Voz de Copalillo, A.C.	—N/a	—N/a
XHCPAF-FM	103.3 FM	Iguala de la Independencia	Universidad Tecnológica de la Región Norte de Guerrero	Radio Universidad Tecnológica de la Región Norte de Guerrero	University radio
XHPO-FM	103.9 FM	Acapulco	XHPO-FM, S.A. de C.V.	Buenisiima	Regional Mexican
XHCSBI-FM	104.3 FM	Chilpancingo	Voz de Transformación, A.C.	Radio Restauración	Christian
XHCI-FM	104.7 FM	Acapulco	X.E.C.I., S.A. de C.V.	Romántica	Romantic
XHEZUM-FM	105.1 FM	Chilpancingo	Radio Cañón, S.A. de C.V.	W Radio	News/talk
XHAGR-FM	105.5 FM	Acapulco	Transmisora Regional Radio Fórmula, S.A. de C.V.	Radio Fórmula	News/talk
XHIG-FM	106.5 FM	Iguala	Radio Iguala, S.A. de C.V.	La Grande de Iguala	Regional Mexican
XHSCDW-FM	107.1 FM	Arcelia	Comunicaciones y Cultura de Tierra Caliente, A.C.	La Morenita Calentana	Community radio
XHSCDE-FM	107.5 FM	Petatlán	Radio Coral, A.C.	La Costeñita	Community radio
XHSCAS-FM	107.9 FM	Chilpancingo	Digital con Sentido Social 106.3, A.C.	DSS Radio	Community radio
XHSCAK-FM	107.9 FM	Taxco (Zacazontla, Santa Rosa, Taxco El Viejo y Minas Viejas)	Domi Bello de Tenorio, A.C.	Plata Radio	Community radio
XHSCDG-FM	107.9 FM	Tlapa de Comonfort	Asociación Cívica, Cultural y de Relaciones Humanas, A.C.	Suriana Radio	Community radio

== Defunct stations ==
- XHSUR-FM 93.5, Chilapa de Álvarez (1990–2021)
