= XHBB-FM =

Radio station in Acapulco, Guerrero, Mexico

XEBB-AM/XHBB-FM
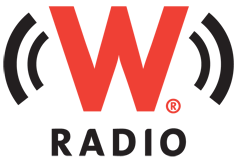
- Acapulco, Guerrero; Mexico
- Frequencies: 600 kHz; 101.5 MHz
- Branding: W Radio

Programming
- Format: news/talk
- Affiliations: Radiopolis

Ownership
- Owner: Grupo Radio Cañón; (Radio Cañón, S.A. de C.V.)
- Sister stations: XHMAR-FM, XHAGE-FM

History
- First air date: January 26, 1953 (concession); 1994 (FM)

Technical information
- Power: 5 kW day/1 kW night
- ERP: 10 kW

Links
- Webcast: Listen live
- Website: grupo-rc.mx

XHBB-FM 101.5/XEBB-AM 600 is a combo radio station in Acapulco, Guerrero, Mexico. It is owned by Grupo Radio Cañón and carries the W Radio news/talk format from Radiópolis.

== History ==
XEBB received its first concession on January 26, 1953. It was owned by Radio Acapulco, S.A. The station was originally known as "La Grande de Acapulco". In 1991, XEBB became a La Comadre with a Regional Mexican format. XEBB added its FM counterpart in 1994 and was consolidated into Radio Integral in 2000.

Logo as "101.5 La Comadre"

La Comadre ran on XHBB until April 8, 2024, when Grupo ACIR dropped its formats from the cluster it ran in the market. Starting May 2, the three Grupo ACIR stations in Acapulco (XHMAR, XHBB and XHAGE) were leased to a new operator, Grupo Radio Cañon, ahead of a sale. XHBB/XEBB took on the W Radio format from Radiópolis. W Radio had previously been in Acapulco on XHNS-FM 96.9, XHPA-FM 93.7 and XHEVP-FM 95.3/XEVP-AM 1030, all stations owned by Grupo Radiorama.
