= North American Regional Broadcasting Agreement =

1941 AM/mediumwave radio station allocation agreement

The North American Regional Broadcasting Agreement (NARBA, French: Accord régional sur la radiodiffusion en Amérique du Nord; Spanish: Convenio Regional Norteamericano de Radiodifusión) refers to a series of international treaties that defined technical standards for AM band (mediumwave) radio stations. These agreements also addressed how frequency assignments were distributed among the signatories, with a special emphasis on high-powered clear channel allocations.

The initial NARBA bandplan, also known as the "Havana Treaty", was signed by the United States, Canada, Mexico, Cuba, the Dominican Republic, and Haiti on December 13, 1937, and took effect March 29, 1941. A series of modifications and adjustments followed, also under the NARBA name. NARBA's provisions were largely supplanted in 1983, with the adoption of the Regional Agreement for the Medium Frequency Broadcasting Service in Region 2 (Rio Agreement), which covered the entire Western hemisphere. However, the AM band assignments in North America largely reflect the standards first established by the NARBA agreements.

== Background ==
Organized AM (mediumwave) radio broadcasting began in the early 1920s, and the United States soon dominated the North American airwaves, with more than 500 stations by the end of 1922. Due to a change in the ionosphere after the sun sets, nighttime signals from AM band stations are reflected for distances extending for hundreds of kilometers. This is valuable in providing radio programming to sparsely settled areas using high-powered transmitters. However, it also leads to the need for international cooperation in station assignments, to avoid mutually interfering signals.

In an effort to rationalize assignments, a major reallocation went into force in the U.S. on November 11, 1928, following the standards set by the Federal Radio Commission's (FRC) General Order 40. At that time, the AM band was defined as 96 frequencies, running in 10 kilocycle-per-second (kHz) steps from 550 to 1500 kHz, which were divided into what became known as "Local", "Regional", and "Clear Channel" frequencies. The only provision the FRC made addressing international concerns was that six frequencies — 690, 730, 840, 910, 960, and 1030 — were designated for exclusive Canadian use. On May 5, 1932, through an exchange of letters, the U.S. and Canada informally endorsed and expanded the 1928 standards, including recognition of Canadian use of 540 kHz. During the 1930s, Canada also began using 1510 kHz, while in 1934, the U.S. authorized two experimental high-fidelity stations on each of 1530 and 1550 kHz. By 1939, Cuban stations existed on frequencies as high as 1600 kHz.

As other countries, especially Mexico and Cuba, developed their own radio broadcasting services, the need arose to standardize engineering practices, reduce interference, and more fairly distribute clear channel assignments. Moreover, the development of better frequency control, and especially directional antennas, made it possible for additional stations to operate on the same or close by frequencies without significantly increasing interference. A key objective for the United States was that, in exchange for receiving clear channel assignments, Mexico would eliminate the high-powered English-language "border blaster" stations that had been directing their programming toward the U.S. and causing significant interference to U.S. and Canadian stations. However, an initial international meeting held in Mexico City in the summer of 1933 failed, primarily due to a lack of agreement over how many clear channel frequencies would be assigned to Mexico.

== 1937 "Havana Treaty" ==
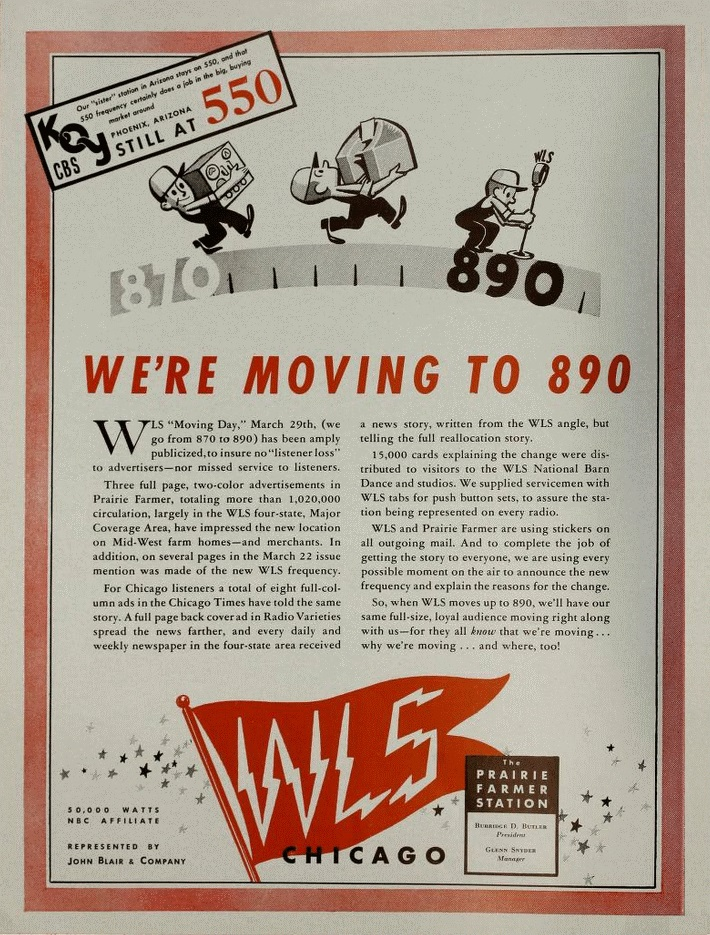
WLS, Chicago, advertisement promoting its March 29, 1941, move from 870 to 890 kHz

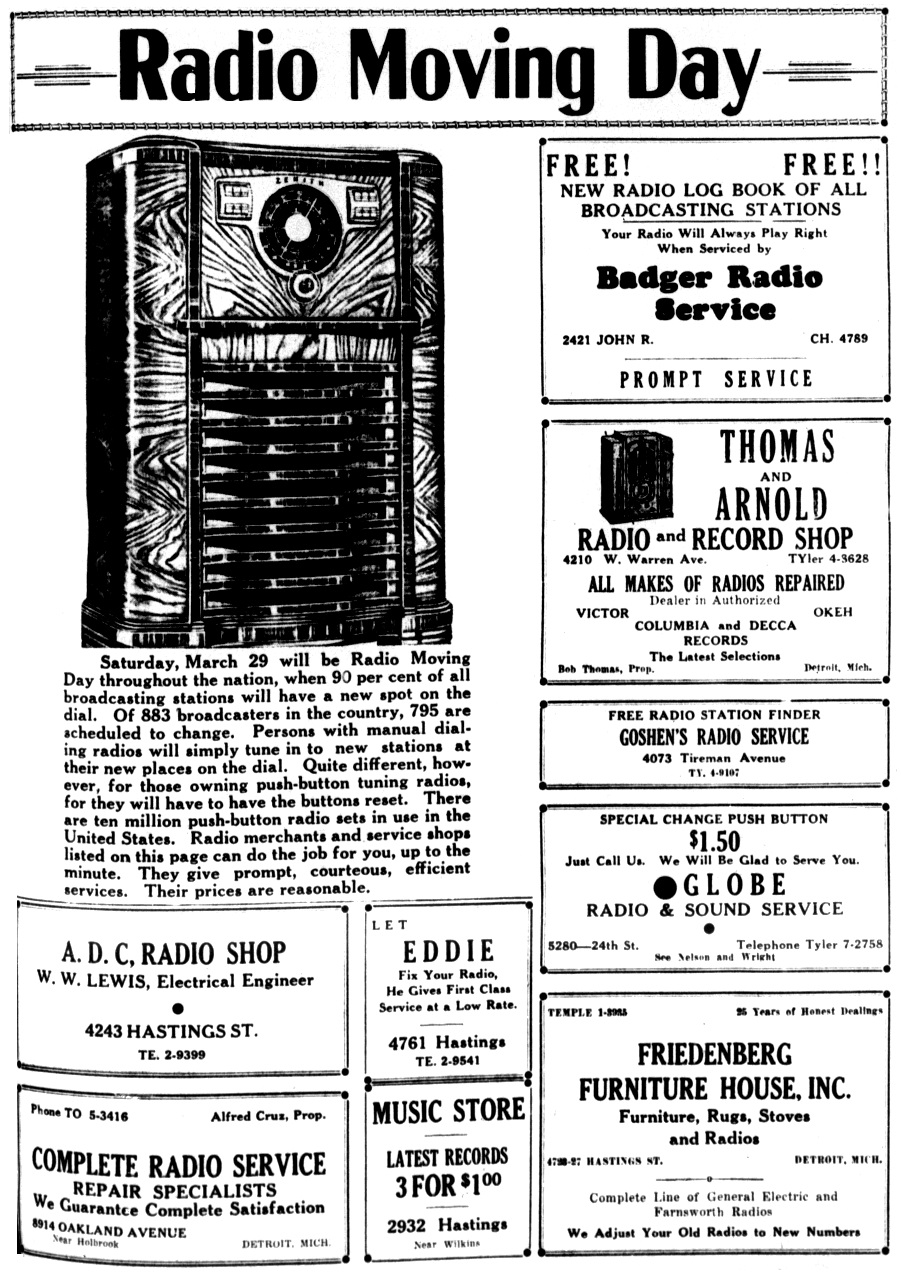
Radio dealer advertisements soliciting customers needing help in resetting the mechanical push buttons on their console receivers.

In 1937, a series of radio conferences, this time successful, was held in Havana, Cuba, and the initial NARBA agreement was signed on December 13, 1937, by representatives from the United States, Canada, Cuba, Mexico, the Dominican Republic, and Haiti. The most significant change was the formal addition of 10 broadcasting frequencies, from 1510 to 1600 kHz, with the 106 available frequencies divided into Clear Channel (59 frequencies), Regional (41) and Local (6) designations. The official lower limit remained at 550 kHz, as it was not possible to add stations at the bottom of the broadcast band due to the need to protect 500 kHz — a maritime international distress frequency — from interference. (Although operation on 540 kHz was not covered by the Agreement, unofficially it became an additional Canadian clear channel frequency.)

Under the Agreement, most existing stations operating on 740 kHz or higher would have to change frequencies. Open frequencies were created throughout the band by "stretching out" the existing assignments, achieved by following a table which in most cases moved all the stations on a common frequency to a new, higher, dial position. This provided gaps of unassigned frequencies, most of which became clear channels allocated to Mexico and Canada. A majority of the frequency shifts were limited to between 10 and 30 kHz, which conserved the electrical height of a station's existing vertical radiator towers, an important factor for readjusting directional antenna parameters to accommodate the new frequency.

Individual stations were specified to be Class I, II, III, or IV, with the class determining the maximum power a station could use and its interference protection standards. In all of the participating countries, Class I and II stations were exclusively assigned to Clear Channel frequencies, while Class III was synonymous with a Regional frequency assignment. In the United States, Class IV stations were only assigned to Local frequencies, although in other countries they were assigned to both Local and Regional ones. A major change was the provision that some clear channels were allocated to be used simultaneously by two stations — those maintaining sole use of a frequency were classified as Class I-A, while stations sharing a clear channel were known as Class I-B. The Agreement assigned six Class I-A frequencies each to Mexico and Canada, and one to Cuba.

Reflecting the existence of improved radio design, the Agreement also reduced the "same market" minimum frequency separation from 50 to 40 kHz. (Mexico elected to further adopt a 30 kHz "same market" spacing, unless this was in conflict with an adjoining nation's "border zone" allocations.) This closer spacing was particularly important in the case of the two highest Local frequencies, 1420 and 1500 kHz, as stations on these frequencies were being moved to 1450 and 1490 kHz, a 40 kHz separation.

According to the Agreement's provisions, its implementation was to take place within one year after its adoption by the pact's four main signatories — the United States, Canada, Cuba and Mexico. Cuba was the first to ratify, on December 22, 1937, and was followed by the U.S. on June 15, 1938, and Canada on November 29, 1938. While waiting on Mexico, in 1939, the U.S. and Canada completed a frequency agreement based on the treaty standards. Mexico finally approved the treaty on December 29, 1939, and work commenced on adopting its wide-ranging provisions.

== March 29, 1941 implementation ==
An engineering conference, with representatives from the U.S., Canada, Cuba, the Dominican Republic, and Mexico, was held from January 14–30, 1941, in Washington, D.C., in order to coordinate the upcoming changes. With a few exceptions, the frequency shifts were scheduled to be implemented at 0800 Greenwich Mean Time (3 a.m. E.S.T.) on March 29, 1941, which was informally known as "moving day". (Philadelphia stations petitioned mayor Robert Lamberton to declare a "Radio Moving Day", but he refused on the grounds that "My experience has been that proclamations by the mayor mean just exactly nothing and I issue as few as I can.")

The frequency changes affected "about a thousand stations in 7 countries". The following chart reviews the assignments before and after March 29, 1941, including information about individual U.S. and Canadian stations, and summarizes the most significant changes:

Old Freq. (kHz)	Station(s)	Moved (kHz)	New Freq. (kHz)	Notes
—	new Canadian clear		540	allocated to CBK later shared with Mexico
550–680	all	unchanged	550–680	
690	all, except CFRB	unchanged	690	Canadian clear
690	CFRB		860	
700–720	all	unchanged	700–720	
730	all, except CFPL	unchanged	730	
730	CFPL	—	1570	
—	new Canadian clear		740	allocated to CBL which moved from 840
740–780	all	up 10	750–790	
—	new Mexican clear		800	allocated to XELO
790–830	all	up 20	810–850	
840	CBL	—	740	
—	new Canadian clear		860	allocated to CFRB
850–870	all	up 20	870–890	
—	new Mexican clear		900	
880–970	all	up 30	910–1000	
—	new Canadian clear		1010	allocated to CFCN (now CBR) which moved from 1030
980	KDKA	up 40	1020	
990	WBZ	up 40	1030	
1000	WHO	up 40	1040	
1010	WHN (now WEPN)	up 40	1050	
	KQW (now KCBS)		740	
	WNAD (now KWPN)		640	
	WNOX (now WNML)		990	
—	new Mexican clear		1050	
1020	KYW	up 40	1060	
1030	CFCN (now CBR)	down 20	1010	
1030	CKLW		800	
1040	WTIC; KRLD; KWJJ (now KRSK)	up 40	1080	
1050	KNX	up 20	1070	shared with CBA (now silent)
1060	WBAL	up 30	1090	
1060	WJAG	up 30	1090	this was later traded for 780 with KFAB
1070–1150	all	up 30	1100–1180	
1160	WOWO	up 30	1190	
1160	WWVA	up 10	1170	
1170	WCAU (now WPHT)	up 40	1210	
1180	KEX	up 10	1190	
1180	KOB (now KKOB)		770	Initially assigned to 1030. Changed to 770, November 1941.
1180	WDGY (now KTLK)	down 50	1130	
1180	WINS		1010	
1190	WOAI	up 10	1200	
1190	WSAZ (now WRVC)		930	
1190	WATR		1320	
—	new Mexican clear		1220	allocated to XEB
1200–1450	all	up 30	1230–1480	
1460	KSTP; WJSV (now WFED)	up 40	1500	
1470	KGA; WLAC; WMEX	up 40	1510	
1480	KOMA (now KOKC); WKBW (now WWKB)	up 40	1520	
1490	KFBK; WCKY	up 40	1530	
1500	all	down 10	1490	
1510	CKCR (later CHYM)	down 20	1490	
—	new Bahamian clear		1540	allocated to ZNS-1 shared with KXEL
—	new Canadian/Mexican clear		1550	allocated to CBE (now CBEF) and XERUV, both stations "grandfathered" at 10 kW
1530	W1XBS to WBRY (later WTBY, then WQQW; now dark)	up 60	1590	Since 1934, U.S. frequencies above 1500 had been allocated only to four experimental stations that broadcast with a signal 20 kHz wide for "high fidelity." The stations were converted to regular broadcasting with the NARBA frequency move, having already been allowed to choose normal call signs in 1936.
1530	W9XBY to KITE (now dark)	up 20	1550	Since 1934, U.S. frequencies above 1500 had been allocated only to four experimental stations that broadcast with a signal 20 kHz wide for "high fidelity." The stations were converted to regular broadcasting with the NARBA frequency move, having already been allowed to choose normal call signs in 1936.
1550	W2XR to WQXR (now WFME)	up 10	1560	Since 1934, U.S. frequencies above 1500 had been allocated only to four experimental stations that broadcast with a signal 20 kHz wide for "high fidelity." The stations were converted to regular broadcasting with the NARBA frequency move, having already been allowed to choose normal call signs in 1936.
1550	W6XAI to KPMC (now KNZR)	up 10	1560	Since 1934, U.S. frequencies above 1500 had been allocated only to four experimental stations that broadcast with a signal 20 kHz wide for "high fidelity." The stations were converted to regular broadcasting with the NARBA frequency move, having already been allowed to choose normal call signs in 1936.
—	new Mexican clear		1570	allocated to XERF
—	new Canadian clear		1580	allocated to CBJ
—	new regional channels		1590–1600	1590–1700 after "Rio"

== Refinements ==
A series of modifications would follow the initial treaty, which was scheduled to expire on March 29, 1946. In early 1946, a three-year interim agreement gave Cuba expanded allocations, including the right to share five U.S., three Canadian, and two Mexican clear channel allocations, plus operate high-powered stations on some regional frequencies. The changes also resulted in the Bahamas being granted use of the 1540 kHz clear channel by the U.S.

The interim agreement expired on March 29, 1949, and there was great difficulty in agreeing on a replacement, in particular due to Mexican objections, which led to two failed conferences. A new NARBA agreement, to be effective for 5 years after ratification, was finally signed at Washington, D.C., on November 15, 1950, for the Bahamas, Canada, Cuba, the Dominican Republic, Jamaica, and the United States. Mexico, which had withdrawn from the conference, and Haiti, which did not participate, were to be given a chance to subscribe. (The United States and Mexico made a bilateral agreement in 1957.) This agreement formally added 540 kHz as a clear channel frequency, and also provided for Cuba to share six, and Jamaica two, of the U.S. clear channel allocations. Some provisions remained controversial, and this version of the treaty was not ratified by the United States until early 1960. In 1980, Cuba gave the required one year notification that it was withdrawing from the NARBA treaty.

== 1981 "Rio Agreement" ==
The NARBA treaties have been substantially superseded by the "Regional Agreement for the Medium Frequency Broadcasting Service in Region 2" (Rio Agreement), which covers the entire Western hemisphere, and was signed at Rio de Janeiro, Brazil in 1981, taking effect on July 1, 1983, at 08:00 UTC. The interference protection criteria in the Rio Agreement are significantly different from NARBA's, and the concept of clear channel stations is eliminated. In adopting this agreement, the Bahamas and Canada declared their intent to renounce their adherence to NARBA. However, much of the structure introduced by that treaty remained intact.

== Additional actions ==
On June 8, 1988, another conference held at Rio de Janeiro, this time under the auspices of the International Telecommunication Union, adopted provisions effective July 1, 1990, to add ten AM band frequencies within Region 2, commonly known as the "expanded band", and running from 1610 kHz to 1700 kHz.

The 1950 NARBA provisions are still in effect for the Bahamas, the Dominican Republic, and United States because those countries have not formally abrogated NARBA. The United States also has active bilateral agreements with Canada ("Agreement Between the Government of the United States of America and the Government of Canada Relating to the AM Broadcasting Service in the Medium Frequency Band" (1984) and Mexico ("Agreement Between the Government of the United States of America and the Government of the United Mexican States Relating to the AM Broadcasting Service in the Medium Frequency Band" (1986)).

== See also ==
- Canadian allocations changes under NARBA
- Clear-channel station – a list of North American clear-channel stations
- Geneva Frequency Plan of 1975 – Similar agreement covering the rest of the world
