= WCKB =

Radio station in Dunn, North Carolina

Dunn, North Carolina; United States
- Frequency: 780 kHz
- Branding: Gospel 780

Programming
- Format: Southern gospel

Ownership
- Owner: North Carolina Central Broadcasters, Inc.

History
- First air date: 1946
- Call sign meaning: Where Christians Keep Believing

Technical information
- Licensing authority: FCC
- Facility ID: 47283
- Class: D
- Power: 7,000 watts day 1 watt night
- Transmitter coordinates: 35°17′1″N 78°35′48″W
- Translator: 102.7 W274CA (Dunn)

Links
- Public license information: Public file; LMS
- Website: www.wckb780.com

WCKB (780 AM) is a radio station in Dunn, North Carolina. It airs a Southern gospel music format.

The locally owned outlet airs church services and other related programming on Sundays in addition to the musical shows. WCKB is owned by NC Central Broadcasters. It transmits with 7,000 watts of power during the day and 1 watt at night.

780 AM is a United States clear-channel frequency. WCKB reduces nighttime power to prevent interference with the skywave signal of WBBM in Chicago.

== History ==
When WCKB signed on in 1946, the letters meant "Where Carolina Keeps Building." Now, general manager Ron Tart says, the letters mean "Where Christians Keep Believing."

Lincoln "Uncle Linc" Faulk was the general manager and an announcer for 25 years.

John G. Thomas, WCKB news director, interviewed Ermon Godwin Jr. on his "Retrospect" program in 1969. The younger Godwin described how his father Edmon Godwin Sr. described "Hollerin'," saying it was a part of doing morning chores, or a routine at the end of the day, and each person had a distinctive style. Godwin found a tape of George Denning, who still hollered. On a Saturday "Let's Talk" program on WCKB on which Godwin made an appearance, the idea for the Spivey's Corner hollerin' contest began.

"Good Morning Charlie" includes a "Swap Shop" type segment as well as listeners telling what goes on in their lives.
