= WGES (AM) =

Spanish-language religious radio station in St. Petersburg, Florida

- St. Petersburg, Florida; United States
- Broadcast area: Tampa Bay Area
- Frequency: 680 kHz
- Branding: Genesis Radio 680AM

Programming
- Language: Spanish
- Format: Christian radio

Ownership
- Owner: Revival Ministries International, Inc.

History
- First air date: May 5, 1950
- Former call signs: WPIN (1950–1968); WWBA (1968–1981); WWLF (1981–1982); WLFW (1982–1985); WLFF (1985–1991); WRMD (1991–2006)
- Call sign meaning: Genesis

Technical information
- Licensing authority: FCC
- Facility ID: 74558
- Class: D
- Power: 800 watts day; 140 watts night
- Transmitter coordinates: 27°51′24.1″N 82°37′25.4″W
- Translator: 92.9 W225CQ-HD2 (Tampa)

Links
- Public license information: Public file; LMS
- Webcast: Listen live
- Website: www.genesis680.com

WGES (680 kHz) is an AM radio station licensed to St. Petersburg, Florida, and serving the Tampa Bay area. It broadcasts a Spanish-language Christian radio format and is owned by Revival Ministries International, Inc. The call sign refers to the Book of Genesis from The Bible.

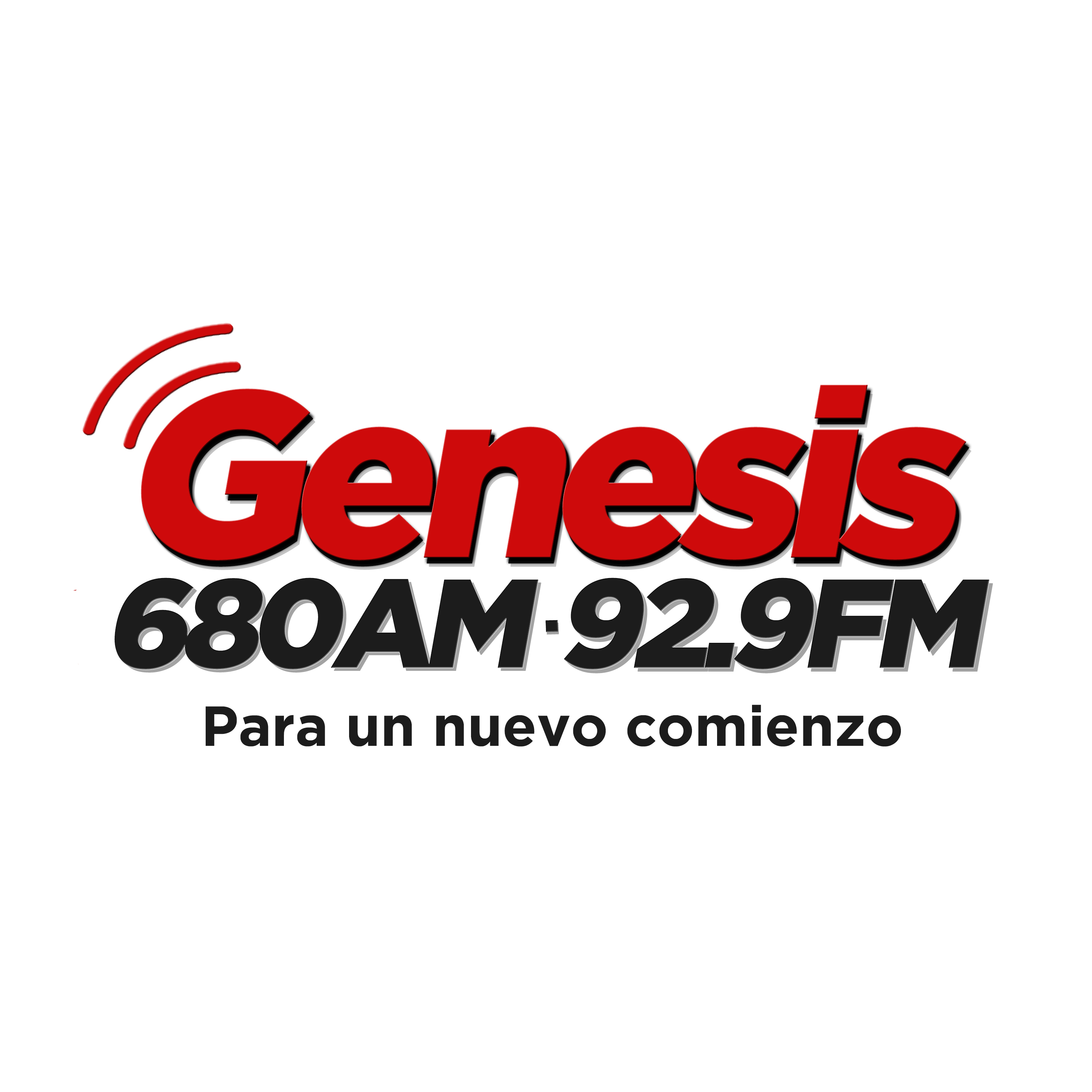
Previous logo

By day, WGES is powered at 800 watts, using a non-directional antenna. As 680 AM is a clear channel frequency, WGES must reduce power at night to 140 watts to avoid interference to other stations. The transmitter is off San Martin Boulevard NE near Riviera Bay in St. Petersburg.

== History ==
The station signed on the air on May 5, 1950, as WPIN. It was a daytimer, powered at 1,000 watts and required to go off the air at sunset. It was owned by Florida West Coast Broadcasters with studios in the Royal Palm Hotel.

For most of its early history, the station was WWBA (referring to Tampa Bay). In the 1960s and 1970s, it simulcast a beautiful music format with its sister station WWBA-FM 107.3 (now WXGL). They played quarter hour sweeps of instrumental cover versions of popular adult songs, as well as Broadway and Hollywood show tunes.
