= XHAGE-FM =

Radio station in Acapulco, Guerrero, Mexico

Acapulco, Guerrero; Mexico
- Frequency: 102.3 MHz
- Branding: Los 40

Programming
- Format: Top 40 (CHR)
- Affiliations: Radiópolis

Ownership
- Owner: Grupo Radio Cañón; (Radio Cañón, S.A. de C.V.)
- Sister stations: XHMAR-FM, XHBB-FM

History
- First air date: January 29, 1993 (concession)
- Call sign meaning: "Acapulco, Guerrero"

Technical information
- ERP: 50 kW

Links
- Webcast: Listen live
- Website: radiocanon.com.mx

XHAGE-FM is a radio station on 102.3 FM in Acapulco, Guerrero, Mexico. It is Grupo owned by Grupo Radio Cañón and carries the Los 40 pop format from Radiópolis.

== History ==
XHAGE received its concession on January 29, 1993. It was owned by Carlos Manuel Flores y Álvarez but promptly sold to ACIR. In 1996, XHAGE began as "Star Mix" with an adult contemporary format until became a simply "Mix" on September 2, 1999.

Mix ran on XHAGE on April 8, 2024, when Grupo ACIR dropped its formats from the cluster it ran in the market. Starting May 2, 2024, the three Grupo Acir stations in Acapulco (XHMAR, XHBB and XHAGE) were leased to a new operator, Grupo Radio Cañon. XHAGE took on the Los 40 format from Radiópolis. Los 40 had previously been in Acapulco on XHCI-FM 104.7 and XHACD-FM 92.1/XEACD-AM 550, all owned by Grupo Radiorama.
