= XHMAR-FM =

Radio station in Acapulco, Guerrero, Mexico

XEMAR-AM / XHMAR-FM
- Acapulco, Guerrero; Mexico
- Frequencies: 710 kHz; 98.5 MHz
- Branding: La Ke Buena

Programming
- Format: Regional Mexican
- Affiliations: Radiópolis

Ownership
- Owner: Grupo Radio Cañón; (Radio Cañón, S.A. de C.V.)
- Sister stations: XHBB-FM, XHAGE-FM

History
- First air date: February 25, 1959; 1994 (FM)
- Former call signs: XEKU-AM (1959-1970s or 1980s)
- Call sign meaning: Mar (sea)

Technical information
- Class: B1 (FM); C (AM)
- Power: 1 kW
- ERP: 10 kW
- Transmitter coordinates: 16°51′42.00″N 99°53′11.0″W

Links
- Webcast: Listen live
- Website: radiocanon.com.mx

XHMAR-FM 98.5/XEMAR-AM 710 is a combo radio station in Acapulco, Guerrero. It is owned by Grupo Radio Cañón and carries the national La Ke Buena Regional Mexican format from Radiópolis.

== History ==
XEMAR received its first concession on February 25, 1959, as XEKU. It was owned by Radio Paraíso, S.A. Sometime in the 1970s or 1980s, XEKU became XEMAR. In 1994, XEMAR became an AM/FM combo.

The station adopted the Inolvidable with a romantic format until the rebranding of Amor in 2002. In mid-2014, the format was moved to XHAGS-FM 103.1, its Digital pop format became Radio Disney and was moved to 98.5.

On December 25, 2019, Disney and Grupo ACIR announced they were mutually ending their relationship, which had covered twelve Mexican cities. Ten of the twelve Radio Disney stations were transitioned to ACIR's replacement pop format, Match, but not XHOK-FM in Monterrey, Nuevo León or XHMAR, which adopted a temporary "98.5 FM" brand.

Amor was moved back from XHAGS-FM to XHMAR on August 4, 2020, after ACIR ceased airing its own formats on stations owned by the Guilbot family in Acapulco and Villahermosa, Tabasco.

Amor ran on XHMAR until April 8, 2024, when Grupo ACIR dropped its formats from the cluster it ran in the market. Starting May 2, 2024, the three ACIR stations in Acapulco (XHMAR, XHBB and XHAGE) were leased to a new operator, Grupo Radio Cañón. XHMAR/XEMAR took on the La Ke Buena Regional Mexican format from Radiópolis. La Ke Buena had previously been in Acapulco on XHPA-FM 93.7, XHPO-FM 103.9 and XHNS-FM 96.9, all run by Grupo Radiorama.
