= 780 AM =

AM radio frequency

The following radio stations broadcast on AM frequency 780 kHz: There are only eight stations in the 48 contiguous United States plus one in Alaska which are authorized to broadcast on 780 AM during nighttime hours. 780 AM is a United States clear-channel frequency. WBBM Chicago and KNOM Nome, Alaska, share Class A status of 780 kHz.

== Argentina ==
- LRA10 in Ushuaia, Tierra del Fuego
- LRA12 in Santo Tomé
- LRF210 Radio 3 in Trelew, Chubut
- LV8 Libertador in Mendoza

== British Virgin Islands ==
- ZBVI

== Mexico ==
- XEGLO-AM in Guelatao de Juárez, Oaxaca
- XESFT-AM in San Fernando, Tamaulipas
- XEXY-AM in Ciudad Altamirano, Guerrero

== United States ==
Stations in bold are clear-channel stations.

Call sign	City of license	Facility ID	Class	Daytime power (kW)	Nighttime power (kW)	Critical hours power (kW)	Transmitter coordinates
KAZM	Sedona, Arizona	64494	D	5	0.095		34.860556°N 111.819444°W
KKOH	Reno, Nevada	11236	B	50	50		39.678056°N 119.801667°W
KLVG	Fountain, Colorado	135885	D	0.5	0.015		38.518611°N 104.600833°W
**KNOM**	Nome, Alaska	9340	A	25	14		64.487778°N 165.299444°W
KSPI	Stillwater, Oklahoma	63441	D	0.25			36.082222°N 97.053611°W
WAVA	Arlington, Virginia	54465	D	12		9.8	38.976389°N 77.114444°W
**WBBM**	Chicago, Illinois	9631	A	45	43		41.934167°N 88.072778°W
WCKB	Dunn, North Carolina	47283	D	7	0.001		35.283333°N 78.596944°W
WIIN	Ridgeland, Mississippi	48646	D	4.4			32.386667°N 90.163056°W
WJAG	Norfolk, Nebraska	73121	D	1			42.031667°N 97.496389°W
WPTN	Cookeville, Tennessee	13820	D	1			36.163333°N 85.524722°W
WWOL	Forest City, North Carolina	27479	D	10			35.350556°N 81.901111°W
WXME	Monticello, Maine	17514	D	5	0.06		46.341667°N 67.817778°W

== In fiction ==
- KACL in Seattle, Washington - featured in the series Frasier
