= XHSFT =

Two Mexican stations bear the callsign XHSFT, both in San Fernando, Tamaulipas:

- XHSFT-FM 103.7, defunct radio station
- XHSFT-TDT channel 25, transmitter for Canal de las Estrellas
