= KAZM =

Radio station in Sedona, Arizona

Currently silent
- Sedona, Arizona; United States
- Broadcast area: North Central Arizona
- Frequency: 780 kHz
- Branding: KAZM 106.5 fm & 780 am Mellow Mountain Radio

Programming
- Format: Full-service radio
- Affiliations: Premiere Networks; Westwood One; Arizona Cardinals; Arizona State University; Arizona Diamondbacks; Phoenix Suns; University of Arizona; Northern Arizona University

Ownership
- Owner: Cutter Grind Broadcasting LLC

History
- First air date: November 1, 1974

Technical information
- Licensing authority: FCC
- Facility ID: 64494
- Class: D
- Power: 5,000 watts day; 95 watts night
- Transmitter coordinates: 34°51′38″N 111°49′10″W
- Translator: 106.5 K293DA (Sedona)

Links
- Public license information: Public file; LMS
- Webcast: Listen live
- Website: www.mellowmountainradio.com

KAZM 780 AM and 106.5 FM is a full-service radio station in Sedona, Arizona, United States. The station is owned by Cutter Grind Broadcasting.

KAZM's skywave signal has been received in Green River, Wyoming, and Salt Lake City, Utah. KAZM can be received across most of northern Arizona during the day, and can be heard in Phoenix under the right conditions.

KAZM is a Class D station broadcasting on the clear-channel frequency of 780 kHz. WBBM in Chicago is the dominant Class A station on this frequency within the lower 48 states. KNOM in Nome, Alaska, is also a Class A station.

== History ==
KAZM first signed on the air on November 1, 1974. The station throughout the years ran a couple of formats, first as MOR and then later adult contemporary from 1984 until the 1990s. It would then become a brokered mixture of news/talk, sports, classic rock, and oldies.

In October 2023, longtime owner Tabback Broadcasting sold KAZM–by then carrying mostly ESPN Radio programming as "ESPN 780"–to Charles Helstein's Cutter Grind Broadcasting in a $390,000 deal completed in February 2024. By the end of 2023, KAZM switched to Mellow Mountain Radio which is a full-service format, consisting of local, state, and national news coverage every hour interspersed with songs within the soft oldies music genre (focused more specifically on the subgenre of "yacht rock"). KAZM also carried live play-by-play coverage of Arizona-based sports teams, but dropped the ESPN Radio affiliation; the lineup also included talk shows such as Coast To Coast AM.

KAZM went silent in March 2026, after being evicted from land owned by the Arizona State Land Department (ASLD) due to violations of its lease. Cutter Grind had not obtained the required insurance, and had operated a campground and vehicular storage yard on the property in contravention of Sedona city ordinances. The lease, which had been slated to run through December 12, 2033, was instead canceled by ASLD on December 9, 2025.
