= XHVG-FM =

XHVG-FM may refer to:

- XHVG-FM (Baja California), a radio station in Mexicali, Baja California, Mexico
- XHVG-FM (Yucatán), a radio station in Mérida, Yucatán, Mexico
