= Geneva Frequency Plan of 1975 =

International agreement about radio broadcast frequencies

ITU's Regions 1 and 3 includes Europe, Africa, and Asia Region 1 Region 2 Region 3

The Final Acts of the Regional Administrative LF/MF Broadcasting Conference (Regions 1 and 3) Geneva, 1975 is the internationally agreed frequency plan which was drawn up to implement the provisions of the Final Acts of the Regional Administrative LF/MF Broadcasting Conference (Regions 1 and 3) held in Geneva, Switzerland, in 1975. It covers radio broadcasting in the long- and medium-wave bands outside the Americas (a separate agreement being in place for North and South America).

The plan was drawn up under the auspices of the World Administrative Radio Conference (WARC) of the International Telecommunication Union (ITU) with the assistance of the European Broadcasting Union (EBU/UER).

The Geneva plan replaced the 1948 Copenhagen plan. It became necessary because of the large number of broadcasting stations in these frequency ranges leading to ever more mutual interference (many countries had refused to ratify the Copenhagen plan and compliance was patchy even among those which had). The Geneva plan entered into force on 23 November 1978 and although its intended lifespan was only until 1989, it is still valid (with small modification by mutual coordination between countries) today, and compliance has been far more widespread.

Most existing European radio stations were required to change their broadcasting frequencies following implementation of the plan. In most cases the changes were slight (less than five kilohertz) but were more drastic in some cases, particularly in the United Kingdom, where all BBC national stations moved to a new wavelength or band. However the increased number of radio services and reduction (in most cases) of interference to radio signals (particularly at nighttime) was considered by most broadcasters to be worth the initial inconvenience.

As a result of the plan most mediumwave (and later longwave) stations outside North and South America operate on exact multiples of 9 kHz; the sum of all digits of the frequency will be 9 or a multiple of 9 (see 9#Mathematics).

== Predecessors to the GE75 Plan ==
- Geneva 1925 (effective 14 November 1926) 10 kHz spacings on MW;
- Brussels 1928 (effective 13 January 1929) 9 kHz spacings on MW (10 kHz above 1000 kHz);
- Prague 1929 (effective 30 June 1929) "European Radio-electric Conference of Prague 1929" 9 kHz spacings on MW (10 kHz above 1400 kHz);
- Madrid/Lucerne 1932 (effective 15 January 1934) "Lucerne Convention European Wavelength Plan" Mostly 9 kHz spacings but not harmonic multiples;
- Montreux 1939 (was to be effective 1940 but never implemented due to World War II);;
- Copenhagen 1948 (effective 15 March 1950) "European LW/MW Conference Copenhagen 1948 (European broadcasting convention)" Mostly 9 kHz (8 kHz above 1529 kHz; 7, 8, and 9 kHz on LW) spacings but not harmonic multiples—offset 1 kHz on MW and (generally) 2 kHz on LW.

A vintage European radio set with a dial marked according to the Copenhagen Plan of 1948

== See also ==
- AM radio
- Mediumwave
- MW DX
- Longwave
- North American Regional Broadcasting Agreement
- Regional Agreement for the Medium Frequency Broadcasting Service in Region 2
