= XHKOK-FM =

Radio station in Acapulco, Guerrero, Mexico

- Acapulco, Guerrero; Mexico
- Frequency: 88.9 MHz
- Branding: Radio de la Costa

Programming
- Format: Spanish tropical music

Ownership
- Owner: Grupo Radiorama; (XEKOK Medio Radial del Pacífico, S.A. de C.V.)
- Operator: Grupo Radio Comunicación
- Sister stations: XHPA-FM, XHCI-FM, XHNS-FM

History
- First air date: October 5, 1978; 48 years ago (concession)
- Former frequencies: 1380 kHz, 750 kHz, 107.5 MHz

Technical information
- Class: B1
- ERP: 25 kW
- Transmitter coordinates: 16°49′42″N 99°51′22″W

Links
- Webcast: Listen live
- Website: radiovision.mx

XHKOK-FM is a radio station on 88.9 FM in Acapulco, Guerrero. It is owned by Grupo Radiorama and operated by Grupo Radio Comunicación, and known as Radio de la Costa with a Spanish-language tropical music format.

== History ==
XEKOK-AM 1380 received its concession on October 5, 1978. It was owned by Jesús Gil Reatiga and broadcast as a 1 kW daytimer from Las Cruces, Guerrero.

In the 1990s, XEKOK was moved to Acapulco and 750 kHz. It also increased its power to 5 kW.

Logo as "Romantica 107.5"

In November 2010, XEKOK was cleared to migrate to FM as XHKOK-FM 107.5. The station changed frequencies to 88.9 MHz on October 20, 2020, in order to clear the reserved band for indigenous and community stations.

Starting January 3, 2022, the four Radiorama stations in Acapulco (XHKOK, XHCI, XHNS, and XHPA) were leased to a new operator, Grupo Radio Visión. Three took on formats from Radiópolis, while XHKOK was affiliated with Imagen Radio. On October 1, 2023, XHKOK switched national talk networks to Heraldo Radio. The Heraldo Radio returns in Acapulco after broadcast on XHACD-FM. Heraldo ended its transmitions for the second time in March 2025, due to the station leased to Grupo Radio Comunicación and became Radio de la Costa, playing a tropical music format.
