= XHNU-FM =

Radio station in Acapulco, Guerrero, Mexico

Acapulco, Guerrero; Mexico
- Frequency: 94.5 MHz
- Branding: Súper

Programming
- Format: Pop

Ownership
- Owner: Grupo Radiorama; (XHNU-FM, S.A.)
- Operator: Grupo Audiorama Comunicaciones
- Sister stations: XHKJ-FM, XHACD-FM, XHEVP-FM, XHPO-FM

History
- First air date: January 4, 1977 (concession)

Technical information
- ERP: 15 kW

XHNU-FM is a radio station on 94.5 FM in Acapulco, Guerrero, Mexico. It is owned by Grupo Radiorama, It is operated by Grupo Audiorama Comunicaciones and carries a pop format known as Súper.

== History ==
XHNU received its concession on January 4, 1977. It was owned by Elba Yolanda Brust Carmona and originally operated on 98.5 MHz (now home to XHMAR-FM). At some point before 1994, XHNU moved to 94.5. Brust Carmona sold to Radiorama in 2006.
