= 650 AM =

AM radio frequency

The following radio stations broadcast on AM frequency 650 kHz: 650 AM is a United States clear-channel frequency. WSM Nashville and KENI Anchorage share Class A status of 650 kHz.

== Argentina ==
- Belgrano in Buenos Aires

== Bolivia ==
- CP 263 in El Alto

== Canada ==
Call sign	City of license	Daytime power (kW)	Nighttime power (kW)	Transmitter coordinates
CKGA	Gander, Newfoundland and Labrador	5	5	48.960278°N 54.660278°W
CKOM	Saskatoon, Saskatchewan	10	10	52.079167°N 106.511389°W

== Colombia ==
- HJKH in Bogotá

== Cuba ==
- CMFA in Cienfuegos
- CMJA in Santiago de Cuba

== Dominican Republic ==
- HIAD in Santo Domingo

== Denmark ==
=== Greenland ===
- OZM in Godhavn

== Honduras ==
- HRLK in Comayagua
- HRVW in San Pedro Sula

== Mexico ==
- XECSBK-AM in Puerto Vallarta, Jalisco
- XEPX-AM in El Vigía/Puerto Ángel, Oaxaca
- XEVG-AM in Mérida, Yucatán
- XEHEEP-AM in Hermosillo, Sonora

== Nicaragua ==
- YNWW in Asese

== Panama ==
- HOS 22 in Panama City

== United States ==
Stations in bold are clear-channel stations.

Call sign	City of license	Facility ID	Class	Daytime power (kW)	Nighttime power (kW)	Unlimited power (kW)	Transmitter coordinates
**KENI**	Anchorage, Alaska	12516	A			50	61.166111°N 149.826111°W
KGAB	Orchard Valley, Wyoming	30224	B	8.5	0.5		41.053056°N 104.8325°W
KIKK	Pasadena, Texas	25450	D	0.25			29.688333°N 95.174722°W
KMTI	Manti, Utah	59035	B	10	0.9		39.294167°N 111.636944°W
KPRP	Honolulu, Hawaii	13880	B			10	21.445278°N 158.063611°W
KSTE	Rancho Cordova, California	22883	B	21.4	0.92		38.479722°N 121.277222°W
WNMT	Nashwauk, Minnesota	73173	B	10	1		47.375278°N 93.015556°W
**WSM**	Nashville, Tennessee	74066	A			50	35.997222°N 86.792222°W

== Uruguay ==
- CX6 Clásica in Montevideo

== Venezuela ==
- YVLH in Maracay
