= Red W Interactiva =

Mexican talk radio network

- Country: Mexico

Programming
- Format: Talk radio

Ownership
- Owner: Grupo Pegaso

History
- Launch date: October 22, 2001
- Closed: January 31, 2002

Red W Interactiva was a talk radio network in Mexico that operated from October 22, 2001, to January 31, 2002. It was owned by Grupo Pegaso, headed by Alejandro Burillo Azcárraga.

== History ==
Red W Interactiva commenced operations on October 22, 2001, featuring a format composed entirely of talk radio programs. It provided talk shows, radio serials, entertainment and celebrity programs, and an audio simulcast of Multivisión's main newscast. The network signed up dozens of affiliates across the country, as many as 48 at launch, and was heard in Mexico City on XEUR-AM 1530. Red W Interactiva's live, talk-heavy format was cited as being a good fit for stations in the interior of the country, at the time primarily on AM. The network also planned opt-out windows in its programming to incorporate local content.

The name of the network attracted some concern with regard to its similarity to XEW radio, colloquially known as "la W". According to Burillo, the name was chosen in order to "revive the tradition started by Emilio Azcárraga Vidaurreta".

Within months of operation, its owner, Grupo Pegaso, encountered cash flow difficulties that led it to close less profitable ventures, including Red W Interactiva. The network ceased operations on January 31, 2002, with the closure costing Pegaso more than one million dollars and leading to layoffs at the network's Mexico City headquarters. A group of the network's executives, led by Eugenio Bernal Macouzet, sought to continue operation of the network, saying that Pegaso had not given the project enough time to mature. Pegaso's larger problems led to the sale of its core cellular telephony business to Telefónica's Movistar division in 2002; the company also retained XEZHO-AM, a radio station in Zihuatanejo, Guerrero, whose acquisition closed after the discontinuation of operations, on March 25, 2002.

The network had negotiated the rights to radio coverage of the 2002 FIFA World Cup together with Radiorama, MVS Radio, Cadena RASA, and Radio 13; the deal did not continue after Red W Interactiva was shuttered. The network's former affiliates also manifested their discontent against Grupo Pegaso for not maintaining several of the commitments the network had made once it discontinued operations.

== Programs ==
In its brief three months on the air, Red W Interactiva carried a wide range of news, talk and audience participation programs. Daniel Bisogno, one of the hosts of TV Azteca's Ventaneando entertainment talk show, hosted the network's morning show, El exprimidor. Women's programming included the magazine program Diario de una mujer, hosted by Margarita Gralia. Telenovela actor José Ángel Llamas was part of the cast of the radio novel and contest program La recompensa, in which a 500,000-peso prize was on the line.
