= XHZ-FM =

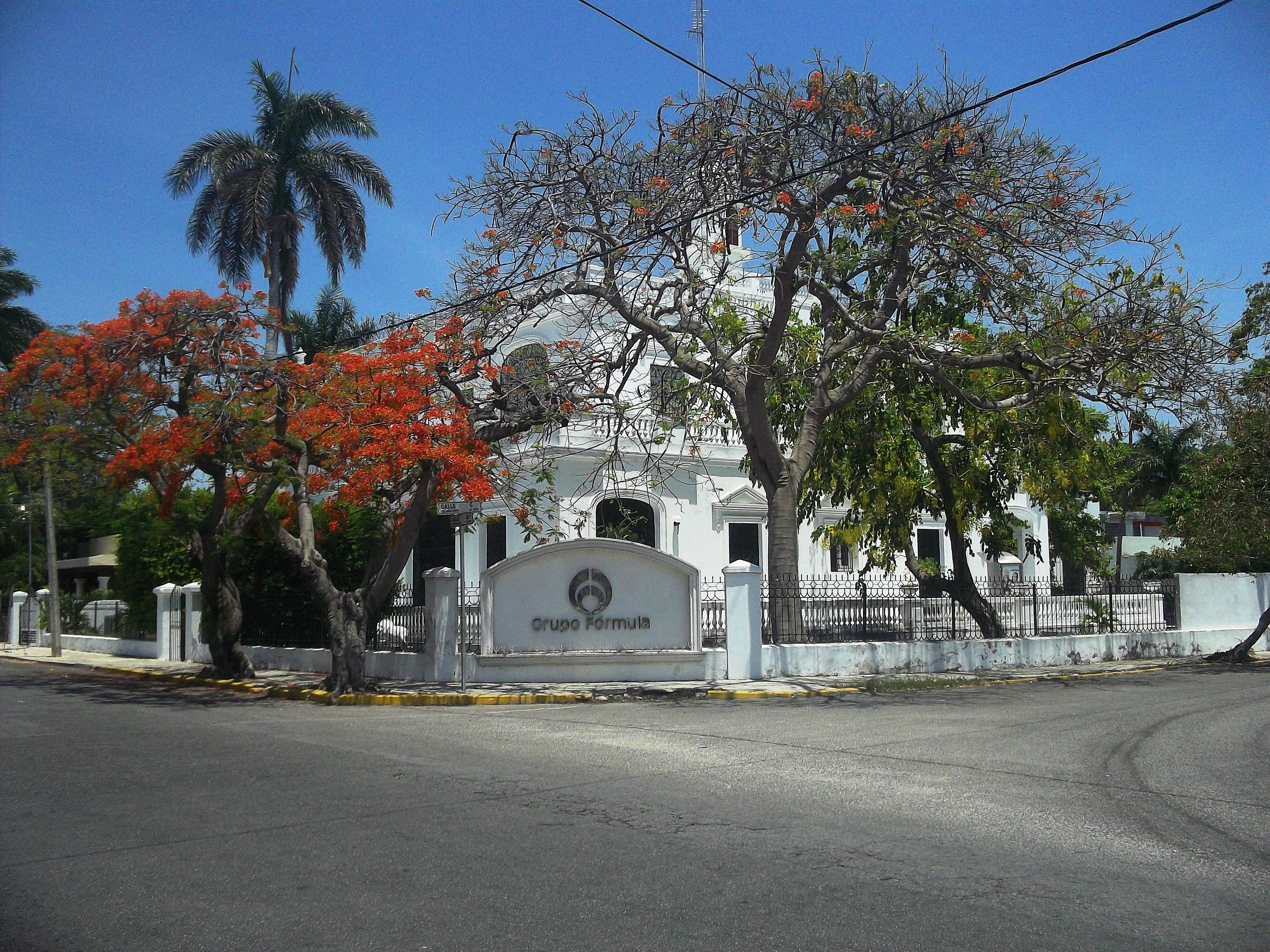
- Mérida, Yucatán; Mexico
- Frequency: 105.1 MHz
- Branding: Radio Fórmula Yucatán (Segunda Cadena)

Programming
- Format: News/talk

Ownership
- Owner: Grupo Fórmula; (Transmisora Regional Radio Fórmula, S.A. de C.V.)
- Sister stations: XHVG-FM

History
- First air date: March 1, 1933 (concession)
- Former frequencies: 630 kHz, 600 kHz

Technical information
- ERP: 25 kW
- Transmitter coordinates: 21°02′53.41″N 89°38′10.69″W

Links
- Website: radioformulayucatan.com

XHZ-FM is a radio station on 105.1 FM in Mérida, Yucatán, Mexico. It is an owned and operated station of Radio Fórmula.

== History ==
XHZ is among southern Mexico's oldest radio stations. It traces its lineage to a station operated by Jorge L. Palomeque and authorized on March 12, 1935 (with a concession key of March 1, 1933). XEZ-AM broadcast on 630 kilohertz with a power of 500 watts. Palomeque sold the station to La Voz de la Península, S.A. in 1955. By the 1960s, XEZ had moved to 600 and broadcast with 2,000 watts of power. In the 1980s, it further increased its daytime power to 5 kilowatts, and in 2001, Radio Fórmula bought XEZ.

In 2010, XEZ was authorized to move to FM.

On November 1, 2022, XHACA-FM and XHZ adopted Radio Fórmula's Trión musical brand. And on 2025, XHZ returned to its news/talk format.
