= 680 AM =

AM radio frequency

The following radio stations broadcast on AM frequency 680 kHz: 680 AM is a North American clear-channel frequency. KNBR and KBRW share Class A status on 680 kHz. WRKO, WPTF, CJOB, and CFTR also broadcast on 680 kHz, with 50,000 watts at all times, but are class B.

== 458 Argentina ==
- LT3 in Rosario, Santa Fe Province
- LU12 in Rio Gallegos, Santa Cruz
- LV6 in Mendoza

== In Canada ==
Call sign	City of license	Daytime power (kW)	Nighttime power (kW)	Transmitter coordinates
CFTR	Toronto, Ontario	50	50	43.214167°N 79.608611°W
CJOB	Winnipeg, Manitoba	50	50	49.653889°N 97.191944°W

== In Mexico ==
- XECHG-AM in Chilpancingo, Guerrero

== In the United States ==
Stations in bold are clear-channel stations.

Call sign	City of license	Facility ID	Class	Daytime power (kW)	Nighttime power (kW)	Unlimited power (kW)	Transmitter coordinates
KBRD	Lacey, Washington	26893	D	0.25			47.062222°N 122.830278°W
**KBRW**	Barrow, Alaska	60375	A	10	10		71.256667°N 156.525556°W
KFEQ	St. Joseph, Missouri	34419	B	5	5		39.828611°N 94.805556°W
KKGR	East Helena, Montana	49725	D	5			46.568889°N 111.908889°W
KKYX	San Antonio, Texas	48273	B	50	10		29.500833°N 98.831667°W
**KNBR**	San Francisco, California	35208	A			50	37.547222°N 122.233333°W
KOMW	Omak, Washington	49163	D	5			48.394444°N 119.533333°W
KWKA	Clovis, New Mexico	14748	B			0.5	34.363333°N 103.218056°W
WAPA	San Juan, Puerto Rico	8889	B	10	9.5		18.404444°N 65.947778°W
WCBM	Baltimore, Maryland	4759	B	50	20		39.374167°N 76.858056°W
WCNN	North Atlanta, Georgia	56389	B	50	10		33.961667°N 84.263333°W
WCTT	Corbin, Kentucky	14361	B	0.77	0.83		36.9025°N 84.080556°W
WDBC	Escanaba, Michigan	35115	B	6	1		45.763056°N 87.094722°W
WGES	St. Petersburg, Florida	74558	D	0.8	0.14		27.856389°N 82.623889°W
WHBE	Newburg, Kentucky	56520	B	1	0.45		38.091944°N 85.682222°W
WINR	Binghamton, New York	67191	B	5	0.5		42.114722°N 75.854444°W
WISR	Butler, Pennsylvania	7900	D	0.25	0.05		40.8775°N 79.9025°W
WKAZ	Charleston, West Virginia	71662	B	10	0.221		38.318611°N 81.541111°W
WMFS	Memphis, Tennessee	34374	B	8	5		35.222778°N 90.043611°W
WNZK	Dearborn Heights, Michigan	5348	B		2.5		42.098611°N 83.33°W
WOGO	Hallie, Wisconsin	63427	B	2.5	0.5		44.889444°N 91.384167°W
WPTF	Raleigh, North Carolina	21630	B	50	50		35.793889°N 78.761389°W
WRKO	Boston, Massachusetts	1902	B	50	50		42.490278°N 71.218056°W
