= Canadian allocations changes under NARBA =

1941 changes in radio station allotments

The North American Regional Broadcasting Agreement (NARBA) took effect on March 29, 1941, requiring nearly all radio stations in North America to change frequency. This article details the major Canadian allocations changes under NARBA.

The principal reason for Canada in entering the NARBA negotiations was to gain more clear-channel allocations for Canadian stations, particularly for the CBC, which at that time was both Canada's public broadcaster and also its broadcasting regulator. Up to that point, these allocations had been dominated by commercial stations from the United States. Canada had only six clear-channel frequencies: 540, 690, 730, 840, 910, and 1050, of which 540, 730, and 910 were shared with Mexico, and 1050 was shared with the United States.

The result of the treaty for Canada was to add new clear-channel allocations at 740, 990, and 1010; with the expansion of the AM band to 1605 kHz, Canada would later add 1580.

Most stations throughout North America were minimally affected by the allocations changes. Their channels simply moved up (or in a few cases down) the dial to a new frequency which was shared (or not) with the same stations as were there before. Major Canadian cities, however, saw more changes, as the creation of the three new clear channels invited a reshuffle of channels among the existing broadcasters. (No new Canadian stations were licensed as a part of this process.) The major changes were as follows:

- In the Maritimes, CBA in Sackville, New Brunswick moved from 1050 to 1070. There were (and are) no other clear-channel stations in the Maritimes.
- In Quebec, all of the important stations were located in Montreal. CKAC on 730 remained unchanged. CBF moved from 910 (which would have become 940) to 690, paving the way for CBM to move from 960, a regional channel, to clear-channel 940.
- In Ontario, changes were again limited to the largest city, Toronto. CBL moved from 840 (which would have become 860) to the new clear, 740. This allowed CFRB to move from 690 to 860, freeing up 690 for use in Montreal.
- In Manitoba, Winnipeg's CKY moved from 910 to 990. (The channel would eventually be taken over by the CBC.)
- In Alberta, CJCA in Edmonton moved from clear channel 730 to regional channel 930. (This would make it possible for the CBC to later build CBX in Edmonton on 740 kHz.) In Calgary, CFCN moved from 1030 to 1010; that channel would also eventually be taken over by the CBC.
- In British Columbia, Vancouver's CBR moved from 1100 to 1130, both secondary assignments on a U.S. clear channel. (It would only later move to 690, opening up the 1130 allocation for a commercial station in Vancouver.)
