= XHSFT-FM =

Former radio station in San Fernando, Tamaulipas

XESFT-AM, XHSFT-FM
Defunct
- San Fernando, Tamaulipas; Mexico
- Frequencies: 780 AM, 103.7 FM

Ownership
- Owner: Radio Tauro, S.A. de C.V.

History
- First air date: November 9, 1988
- Last air date: June 2019
- Call sign meaning: San Fernando Tamaulipas

Technical information
- Class: B (FM); AA (FM)
- Power: 5,000 watts daytime 1,000 watts nighttime
- ERP: 6 kW
- Transmitter coordinates: 24°50′06″N 98°10′18″W

XESFT-AM/XHSFT-FM was a combo radio station in San Fernando, Tamaulipas. It last carried the Regional Mexican format known as La Poderosa.

== History ==
XESFT-AM received its concession on November 7, 1988, and signed on two days later. It was owned by Arnoldo Rodríguez Zermeño. In 1997, Zermeño sold the station to Radiodifusora XESFT, S.A. de C.V., which in turn sold it to its final concessionaire, controlled by Raúl Garza Acosta and Raúl Gregorio Garza Salazar, in 2000.

It was authorized to migrate to FM in 2011. The station's concession expired without a renewal on November 6, 2015, and XHSFT was officially taken off the air in June 2019, leaving the entire municipality of San Fernando without any FM radio service and prompting the municipality to buy advertising on its own pirate Christian radio station.
