= XHAGS-FM =

Radio station in Acapulco, Guerrero, Mexico

- Acapulco, Guerrero; Mexico
- Frequency: 103.1 MHz
- Branding: Estéreo Pop

Programming
- Format: Contemporary hit radio

Ownership
- Owner: Guilbot family; (Radio XEAGS, S.A. de C.V.)
- Operator: Imagina Más Radio

History
- First air date: November 24, 1992 (concession); 1994 (FM)
- Former call signs: XEVMA-AM, XEAGS-AM
- Former frequencies: 1430 kHz, 1070 kHz
- Call sign meaning: Station founder Alberto Guilbot Serros

Technical information
- Power: 1 kW day/0.2 kW night
- ERP: 15 kW

XHAGS-FM 103.1 is a radio station in Acapulco, Guerrero. It is owned by the Guilbot family and operated by Imagina Más Radio.

== History ==
XEAGS received its first concession on November 24, 1992. Originally XEVMA-AM on 1430, it promptly became XEAGS-AM/XHAGS-FM, a full combo, and it moved to 1070 AM. The station was rechristened with the initials of its owner, Alberto Guilbot Serros. In 1999, Serros transferred the concession to its current concessionaire, which he owned. For a significant period of time, Grupo ACIR operated XEAGS/XHAGS as well as XHVILL-FM in Villahermosa, Tabasco.

The Amor format moved from XHMAR-FM 98.5 in early 2014. XHAGS had previously been Digital 103.1 with a pop format. Amor returned to XHMAR on August 4, 2020.
