= ZBVI =

Tortola; British Virgin Islands
- Broadcast area: Eastern Caribbean
- Frequency: 780 kHz
- Branding: ZBVI 780 AM

Programming
- Format: Adult contemporary/Caribbean

History
- First air date: 1965

Technical information
- Facility ID: 99877
- Power: 10,000 watts daytime 20,000 watts night
- Transmitter coordinates: 18°25′28″N 64°36′17″W

Links
- Website: zbviradio.net

ZBVI 780 is an AM radio station broadcasting from Tortola, British Virgin Islands. Although the station is located in the British Virgin Islands the broadcast reach extends to Anguilla, the United States Virgin Islands and Puerto Rico's islands Culebra and Vieques. In 1971 the United States banned cigarette radio advertising, resulting in ZBVI having a category of niche advertising clients.
