= XHCI-FM =

Radio station in Acapulco, Guerrero, Mexico

- Acapulco, Guerrero; Mexico
- Frequency: 104.7 MHz
- Branding: Romántica

Programming
- Format: Spanish adult hits

Ownership
- Owner: Grupo Radiorama; (X.E.C.I., S.A. de C.V.)
- Operator: Grupo Radio Visión
- Sister stations: XHPA-FM, XHKOK-FM, XHNS-FM

History
- First air date: September 24, 1958 (concession)

Technical information
- ERP: 25 kW
- Transmitter coordinates: 16°52′49.51″N 99°51′16.5″W

Links
- Webcast: Listen live
- Website: radiovision.mx

XHCI-FM is a radio station on 104.7 FM in Acapulco, Guerrero. It is owned by Grupo Radiorama and operated by Grupo Radio Visión with a Spanish-language adult hits format known as Romántica.

== History ==
XECI-AM 1340 received its concession on September 24, 1958. By 1970, it was owned by Eduardo Morales Díaz de la Vega. The station was later branded as La Nueva Radiorama and La Nueva 13-40. In the 1980s, the English-language music program Súper Chavo 13-40 was among the most popular in the market.

In the 1990s, XECI-AM was known as Romántica 1340. In 2005, XHCI changed the format to Rock 1340, rock music in Spanish and English; this lasted until April 30, 2007, when it returned to a Spanish adult hits format.

In November 2010, XECI was cleared to migrate to FM as XHCI-FM 104.7. In 2015, Romántica was moved to another station, XHKOK-FM, and XHCI-FM was relaunched as @FM (Arroba FM) with a pop format.

Logo used 2015–2021 with the @Arroba FM format

Starting January 3, 2022, the four Radiorama stations in Acapulco (XHKOK, XHCI, XHNS, and XHPA) were leased to a new operator, Grupo Radio Visión. XHCI took on the Los 40 Principales format from Radiópolis. Los 40 had previously been in Acapulco on XHACD-FM 92.1/XEACD-AM 550.

On April 1, 2024, Grupo Radio Visión dropped all Radiópolis formats. The station flipped back to romantic. Then in March 2025, operation of the station was leased to Grupo Radio Comunicación.
