= Regulation of radio transmission in the United States =

Radio regulation in the United States was enforced to eliminate different stations from broadcasting on each other's airwaves. Regulated by the Federal Communications Commission, standardization was encouraged by the chronological and economic advances experienced by the United States of America. Commenced in 1910, before the Communications Act of 1934 was passed, the Federal Radio Commission was the first organization established to control the functioning of radio as a whole through the Commerce Clause. Airwaves run across interstate and international waters, leading to some form of regulation. As years progressed, deregulation was strongly encouraged to provide a little independence from the government.

== History ==
Technology was the driving force in encouraging regulation of broadcast. "The physical limitation on the airwaves or electromagnetic spectrum restricts the number of stations". Regulation of radio was set in motion in 1910 when the US Congress felt legislation was needed over the infant wireless communication industry. First regulated by an independent commission, radio grew exponentially during the 1920s and encouraged the development of broadcasting. As a result, the Radio Act of 1927 was passed. The act's passage was a result of the unrestricted utilization of wireless telegraph and telephone use. The usage impeded upon public and private message transmission, especially vessels in distress. The implementation of the act generated an independent commission, the Federal Radio Commission, to determine regulatory policy for broadcasting in the United States. Designed to be short-term, the act was renewed every year until 1934.

Seven years later, the Communications Act of 1934 was passed and expanded the powers of the agency by introducing the Federal Communications Commission (FCC) as the permanent body to determine regulatory policy of radio and television in the United States, subject to Congressional oversight. Replacing the Federal Radio Commission, the FCC not only regulates radio and television broadcasting under the authority of Federal law, but telephone, telegraph, and cable television. A guideline included in the Communications Act, the Fairness Doctrine, was created to enforce restrictions on radio and television broadcasting until 1987. It was instituted to provide a platform for equal coverage of public issues. During the past 90 years, radio regulation has varied tremendously. In the beginning, the Department of Commerce providing minute oversight and eventually the FCC enforced harsher restrictions. It wasn't until the beginning of the 1980s that the FCC began to adopt less callous regulatory policies on broadcasters, replacing explicit requirements with market based competition.

The Commerce Clause played a huge factor in the regulation of radio. Assigned to Congress by the U.S. Constitution, the clause was implemented to regulate interstate and foreign commerce. Congress has influence over the number, location, and activities of stations all over the country. Early radio stations served as basic communication systems, transmitters of messages that were meant to facilitate commerce and protect the health and well being of U.S. Citizens. Ships with more than 60 passengers were required to have transmitting equipment.

Title 47 is the bible of radio broadcasting. It regulates all radio communication; from how antennas are constructed to rights afforded broadcast employees and customers with disabilities. Regulations can also list out station classifications that determine what frequencies stations broadcast on and how much power a station can use in its broadcasts. Title 47 is extremely diverse in what it controls. Radio broadcasts consist of amplitude modulation (AM) and frequency modulation (FM) stations, noncommercial radio stations, and low-powered broadcast stations, to name a few, all are administrated by the policies in Title 47 of the Code of Federal Regulations. Maintained and published by the Government Printing Office (GPO), all rules can be found in the Federal Register.

== Deregulation ==
A tremendous amount of effort was showcased to regulate radio in a way that benefited everyone. The most significant and controversial events occurred between 1975 and 1995. The deregulation endeavors were very contentious. Many felt that the deregulation of radio would by and large diminish supply of informational programming and end equal coverage of public issues. Commenced in 1981, the deregulation of AM and FM radio content control was orchestrated by the Carter Federal Communications Commission. It was the Reagan FCC that abolished the fairness doctrine in 1987. Dramatic changes occurred in the radio markets. A significant revision was an increase in volume of informational programming. It provided evidence that the possibility of regulation can encourage a "chilling effect" on free speech. Known as the Deregulation of Radio, many felt regulation was being outrageously abused by politicians and special interest groups and discouraging support for content regulation of both radio and television. It was the Carter administration that encouraged the FCC to reverse their position on broadcast radio. The administration advocated for more dependence on marketplace forces and less in content control. According to "Chilling the Internet? Lessons from FCC Regulation of Radio Broadcasting" the Deregulation of Radio consisted of:

- Non entertainment program regulation. The FCC eliminated "guidelines" indicating how much informational programming each station should carry to have its license renewed, replacing it with "a generalized obligation for commercial radio stations to offer programming responsive to public issues."
- Ascertainment. Elimination of formal documentation of "community needs".
- Commercials. Abolition of FCC guidelines on maximum commercial time allowed on radio stations.
- Program logs. Elimination of program logs, to be replaced by "an annual listing of five to ten issues that the licensee covered together with examples of programming offered in response thereto."

Although it influenced a substantial change, the deregulation of radio had no effect on the Fairness Doctrine. It wasn't until 1984 that the FCC began to look at the content of the Fairness Doctrine to question the effectiveness and constitutionality of the policy.

== Programming trends in radio ==
In the past two decades, there have been three significant events in regard to regulating radio. First, taken as a whole, there was a rapid growth in radio stations. Most of the expansion came from FM radio. This was as a result of public policy and market demand. Another noteworthy event was the deregulation of radio in 1981. Lastly, another momentous event that occurred through radio regulation was the abolition of the Fairness Doctrine in August 1987.

== Evolution of federal policy decisions ==
- 1906: The first international radio convention was assembled at Berne, Switzerland.
- 1910: Congress passed legislation placing telegraph, telephone, and cable companies doing interstate business under the jurisdiction of the Interstate Commerce Commission. The Radio Act of 1910 signed into law.
- 1911: A radio division was established by the Department of Commerce to govern the Radio Act of 1910.
- 1912: Congress passed the "Marine Act" to regulate communications. This was the first general US law to oversee the use of radio transmissions.
- 1927: The Federal Radio Act formed the Federal Radio Commission.
- 1930: Federal Radio Commission made permanent by Congress.
- 1934: The Communications Act was created. Establishing the Fairness Doctrine.
- 1959: Amendment of the Communications Act.
- 1987: Fairness Doctrine abolished.

== Legal cases ==
In 1969, the Red Lion Broadcasting Company argued that the FCC had violated their constitutional rights through the First Amendment. The broadcasting company argued that a rule that was implemented by the FCC, "requiring a person or group whose character, honesty or integrity is attacked on the Plaintiff's (Red Lion) broadcast be given the opportunity to respond to the attack is unconstitutional". The Supreme Court upheld the Fairness Doctrine in its final decision. After the conclusion of the case, the FCC initialized a rule-making proceeding to make any personal attacks to the Fairness Doctrine more clear cut and easily enforceable. Around 1973, broadcasting company Columbia Broadcasting System went to court to contest the Democratic National Committee about abusing their First Amendment right. The Supreme Court decided that "a broadcast licensee's general policy of not selling advertising time to groups or individuals wishing to speak on issues they consider important" doesn't infringe upon the Communications Act of 1934 or their First Amendment.
