= XHACA-FM =

Radio station in Acapulco, Guerrero

Acapulco, Guerrero; Mexico
- Frequency: 96.1 MHz
- Branding: Trión

Programming
- Format: Alternative rock

Ownership
- Owner: Radio Fórmula; (Transmisora Regional Radio Fórmula, S.A. de C.V.)
- Sister stations: XHAGR-FM

History
- First air date: November 10, 1964 (concession)
- Former call signs: XEIZ-AM, XEACA-AM
- Former frequencies: 630 kHz, 950 kHz, 106.3 MHz
- Call sign meaning: Acapulco

Technical information
- ERP: 10 kW
- HAAT: 437.3 m
- Transmitter coordinates: 16°49′15.17″N 99°50′06.52″W

Links
- Website: trion.fm

XHACA-FM is a radio station on 96.1 FM in Acapulco, Guerrero. It is part of Radio Fórmula.

== History ==
XEIZ-AM 630 received its concession on November 10, 1964. It quickly became XEACA-AM and broadcast with 5,000 watts on 630 kHz.

XEACA moved to 950 kHz in the 1990s and was sold to Grupo ACIR, carrying its Radio ACIR and Radio Felicidad formats. ACIR shed the station in 2009 to a concessionaire owned by Efrén Huerta Rodríguez and Roberto Agustín Shimidzu Castro on behalf of Grupo Fórmula.

In November 2010, XEACA was approved to migrate to FM on 106.3 MHz as XHACA-FM. However, 106-108 MHz was designated in 2014 as a reserved band for community and indigenous radio stations. As 96.1 MHz was available for a Class B1 station, the Federal Telecommunications Institute ordered XHACA to move to 96.1 in the near future upon renewing its concession in 2017; the change took place on January 30, 2021.

On November 1, 2022, XHACA-FM and XHZ-FM in Mérida, Yucatán, adopted Radio Fórmula's Trión musical brand.
