= Radio y Televisión de Guerrero =

State radio and television broadcaster of Mexican state of Guerrero

Radio and Television of Guerrero
- Radio y Televisión de Guerrero

Agency overview
- Formed: 1980
- Headquarters: Monte Blanco 37, Fracc. Hornos Insurgentes, Acapulco, Guerrero, Mexico
- Website: rtg.com.mx

Radio y Televisión de Guerrero is a statewide public television network and series of radio stations, owned and operated by the agency of the same name in the State of Guerrero.

== History ==
RTG began operations in 1980 with a television station, "Televisión Educativa", channel 7 in the state capital of Chilpancingo. On April 1, 1983, Radio Guerrero, then a separate department of the state government was founded. Its first station was XEGRO-AM 870 in Chilpancingo, and the first program on the station was the second government report of Alejandro Cervantes Delgado. In 1986, XEGRC-AM 820 was built in Coyuca de Catalán.

On June 26, 1987, the television and radio services were combined as Radio y Televisión de Guerrero. The following year, the radio and TV services expanded. Channel 7 added a more powerful transmitter in Acapulco, while AM stations were added in Ometepec and Taxco. At the end of the year, XHGRC-FM 97.7 Acapulco, the flagship of the entire service, came to air. While permitted by 2000, XHZTA-FM 92.1 in Zihuatanejo did not come on air until October 2016.

XEGRO-AM in Chilpancingo was off the air beginning in June 2012, when its equipment was stolen. In 2015, the state government began working to restore the station to service with equipment shared by XECHH-XHCHH "Capital Máxima".

The entire state network saw its concessions lapse in 2022, but the stations continued to broadcast. New concessions for all of the operating RTG stations were issued by the Federal Telecommunications Institute in 2023.

== Radio ==
RTG holds permits for these radio stations:

RTG radio stations
Call sign	Frequency	City
XHCPES-FM	97.7 MHz	Acapulco
XECPCH-AM	870 kHz	Chilpancingo
XECPCG-AM	820 kHz	Coyuca de Catalán
XECPOG-AM	1100 kHz	Ometepec
XECPTG-AM	1310 kHz	Taxco de Alarcón
XHCPEX-FM	92.1 MHz	Zihuatanejo

All of the AM stations are authorized as daytimers but operate from 5 a.m. to midnight. The FM stations operate 24 hours a day.

== Television ==
RTG broadcasts a television service on two stations and on Satmex 5 C-band satellite nationally (4105 MHz, H, 2666 kbit/s, FEC 3/4).

RF	VC	Call sign	Location	ERP
33	4	XHCPFU-TDT	Acapulco	5.79 kW
35	4	XHCPFW-TDT	Chilpancingo	0.4349 kW

In the 2000s, the IPN's Once TV supplied programming to RTG under agreement. In 2006, Canal Once supplied 15 hours a day (on weekdays) of programming to RTG.

RTG's broadcasts in Chilpancingo have been sporadic. In 2012, it was reported that this transmitter was being shut down to conserve electricity. It received its digital authorization very late in 2016, for RF channel 35.

RTG began digital transmissions in 2016 in Acapulco on physical channel 33 and moved to virtual channel 4 in October 2016.
