= XHZHO-FM =

Radio station in Zihuatanejo, Guerrero

- Zihuatanejo, Guerrero; Mexico
- Frequency: 98.5 FM
- Branding: Globo

Programming
- Format: Romantic
- Affiliations: MVS Radio

Ownership
- Owner: Pegaso Radiocomunicaciones, S.A. de C.V.; (Franman Comunicaciones, S.A. de C.V.)

History
- First air date: October 26, 1994 (concession)
- Call sign meaning: Zihuatanejo

Technical information
- ERP: 5 kW
- HAAT: 238.5 m
- Transmitter coordinates: 17°38′52.47″N 101°34′56.05″W

Links
- Website: fmglobo.com/plaza/zihuatanejo/

XHZHO-FM is a radio station on 98.5 FM in Zihuatanejo, Guerrero, Mexico.

== History ==
XEZHO-AM 1410 received its concession on October 26, 1994. It was owned by Radio Fama, S.A. de C.V., broadcasting with 5,000 watts as a daytimer. Pegaso acquired XEZHO in 2002, not long after shuttering its Red W Interactiva radio venture, and converted it to operate with 2 kW day and 1 kW night.

In November 2010, XEZHO was cleared to move to FM as XHZHO-FM 98.5. For a time, it operated as local talk station Zihua 98.5, owned by Grupo Pegaso before flipping to grupera, namely the La Mejor and Ke Buena formats. During this time, XHZHO was a sister station to XHUQ-FM under Alfa Medios.

In October 2016, Ke Buena moved from XHZHO to XHUQ as the former was spun off. Costa Medios retained XHZHO as a grupera station named La Nueva until November 2018, when XHZHO relaunched under new management as La 98.5, Siente El Beat. This lasted until returning to La Mejor on February 15, 2021. The format was then dropped the next year, with XHZHO switching to the sister FM Globo brand in September 2022.
