= XHCHG-FM =

AM and FM radio station in Chilpancingo, Guerrero

XECHG-AM/XHCHG-FM
- Chilpancingo, Guerrero; Mexico
- Frequencies: 680 kHz; 102.7 MHz
- Branding: Súper 102.7

Programming
- Format: Pop music in English and Spanish

Ownership
- Owner: Grupo Audiorama Comunicaciones; (XECHG-AM, S.A. de C.V.)
- Sister stations: XHEPI-FM

History
- First air date: April 26, 1991 (concession); 1994 (FM)
- Former frequencies: 97.9 MHz (1994–2004); 107.1 MHz (2004–2019)
- Call sign meaning: CHilpancingo Guerrero

Technical information
- Class: FM: B1; AM: B
- Power: 5 kW day/2.5 kW night
- ERP: 3 kW
- HAAT: 302 meters (991 ft)
- Transmitter coordinates: 17°33′53.3″N 99°27′31.2″W

Links
- Website: www.audioramaguerrero.mx/super107/

XHCHG-FM/XECHG-AM is a combo radio station on 102.7 FM and 680 AM in Chilpancingo, Guerrero. It is owned by Grupo Audiorama Comunicaciones and known as Súper 102.7 with a pop music format in English and Spanish.

== History ==
Final logo on 107.1 MHz until the April 2019 frequency change

XECHG received its first concession on April 26, 1991. It was owned by Radiorama subsidiary Radio Signo, S.A.

In 1994, XECHG added an FM counterpart, XHCHG-FM on 97.9 MHz. In July 2004, XHCHG was moved from 97.9 to 107.1. XHCHG was moved again to 102.7 MHz on April 12, 2019, as a condition of the renewal of its concession, in order to clear 106-108 MHz as much as possible for community and indigenous stations.
