= XHEPI-FM =

Radio station in Tixtla-Chilpancingo, Guerrero, Mexico

- Tixtla, Guerrero; Mexico
- Broadcast area: Chilpancingo, Guerrero
- Frequency: 99.7 FM
- Branding: La Bestia Grupera

Programming
- Format: Regional Mexican

Ownership
- Owner: Grupo Audiorama Comunicaciones; (Frecuencia Amiga, S.A. de C.V.)
- Sister stations: XHCHG-FM

History
- First air date: December 8, 1961 (concession)

Technical information
- ERP: 3 kW
- Transmitter coordinates: 17°33′44.6″N 99°28′01″W

Links
- Webcast: Listen live
- Website: audiorama.mx

XHEPI-FM is a radio station on 99.7 FM in Chilpancingo, Guerrero, Mexico, with transmitter in Tixtla. It is owned by Grupo Audiorama Comunicaciones and carries its regional Mexican format known as La Bestia Grupera.

== History ==
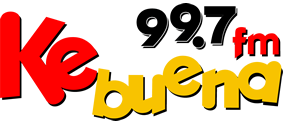
Logo with Ke Buena, used until 2017

XEPI-AM 1250 received its concession on December 8, 1961. It was owned by Andrés Peyrón González and broadcast with 1,000 watts.

In the 1980s, XEPI began to pass through Peyrón González's estate after his death. It was first owned by María Cristina Olaguibel Alemán Vda. de Peyrón, in 1989, and then by Isidoro Carlos Peyrón Pichardo, who picked up the station in 2003.

In 2008, XEPI was cleared to move from 1250 to 990 kHz. It ramped up its power from 2.5 to 20 kW during the day as part of the move.

In November 2010, XEPI was cleared to move to FM as XHEPI-FM 99.7. That same year, it was sold to Frecuencia Amiga, whose shares are owned by members of the Amilpas García family.
