= XHSUR-FM =

Radio station in Chilapa de Álvarez, Guerrero, Mexico

Defunct
- Chilapa de Álvarez, Guerrero; Mexico
- Frequency: 93.5 MHz
- Branding: La Más Bonita

Programming
- Format: Regional Mexican

Ownership
- Owner: Cadena Radial del Sur, S.A. de C.V.

History
- First air date: March 18, 1990
- Last air date: August 31, 2021
- Call sign meaning: SUR

Technical information
- ERP: 12.5 kW
- HAAT: -147.2 m
- Transmitter coordinates: 17°37′02″N 99°11′55″W

XHSUR-FM was a radio station on 93.5 FM in Chilapa de Álvarez, Guerrero, Mexico. It is owned by Cadena Radial del Sur, S.A. de C.V., and is known as La Más Bonita with regional mexican format.

== History ==
XECLA-AM 770 received its concession on August 2, 1989, signing on March 18, 1990. The 1.5 kW daytimer was owned by Alejandro Zendejas López. In 1997, it was sold to Cadena Radial del Sur, S.A. de C.V. and promptly changed calls to reflect its new ownership. It also increased its power to 5 kW day and added 1 kW of nighttime power.

XESUR was cleared for AM-FM migration in 2010 as XHSUR-FM 93.5.

On August 19, 2021, Cadena Radial del Sur surrendered the concession and informed the Federal Telecommunications Institute that it would shutter the station on August 31, citing 3.4 million pesos in debts owed to utilities, back taxes, and other unpaid obligations, as well as the loss of population and businesses due to violence and COVID-19 and a lack of advertisers.
