= XHKJ-FM =

Radio station in Acapulco, Guerrero, Mexico

- Acapulco, Guerrero; Mexico
- Frequency: 89.7 MHz
- Branding: Vida

Programming
- Format: Spanish adult hits

Ownership
- Owner: Grupo Radiorama; (Radio Mar, S.A.)
- Operator: Grupo Audiorama Comunicaciones
- Sister stations: XHACD-FM, XHNU-FM, XHEVP-FM, XHPO-FM

History
- First air date: May 16, 1941

Technical information
- ERP: 15 kW
- HAAT: 346.7 m
- Transmitter coordinates: 16°52′25.93″N 99°51′00.8″W

Links
- Webcast: Listen live
- Website: audiorama.mx

XHKJ-FM is a radio station on 89.7 FM in Acapulco, Guerrero. It is owned by Grupo Radiorama, although it is originally operated by Grupo Audiorama Comunicaciones and known as Vida, carrying a Spanish-languague adult hits format.

== History ==
XEKJ-AM received its concession in 1943, two years after beginning operation. It was Guerrero's first radio station, owned by María del Refugio Acosta de Valdivieso and broadcast with 500 watts day and 250 watts night on 1400 kHz. Ramón Ortega Escobedo bought XEKJ in 1947 and sold it to Radio Mar, S.A. in 1956. XEKJ later began broadcasting with 1,000 watts.

XEKJ was cleared for a FM migration in 2011 as XHKJ-FM 89.7. Its tower was approved to move to Cerro de los Lirios in 2017.
