= XEXY-AM =

Radio station in Ciudad Altamirano, Guerrero, Mexico

- Ciudad Altamirano, Guerrero; Mexico
- Frequency: 780 kHz
- Branding: La Poderosa Voz del Balsas

Ownership
- Owner: Sucesión de Rafael García Vergara
- Sister stations: XERY-AM

History
- First air date: December 13, 1969

Technical information
- Power: 2.5 kW
- Transmitter coordinates: 18°22′14″N 100°40′44″W

Links
- Website: www.radioxexy.mx

XEXY-AM is a radio station on 780 AM in Ciudad Altamirano, Guerrero, Mexico. It is owned by the García Vergara family and known as La Poderosa Voz del Balsas.

== History ==
XEXY received its concession on December 13, 1969. It was owned by Rafael García Vergara and broadcast with 500 watts as a daytimer on 1530 kHz. By the 1980s, it was operating with 1,000 watts, and it later moved to 780 in order to broadcast with 2.5 kW.

XEXY was cleared for AM-FM migration in 2011 as XHXY-FM 89.5. The migration never took place, as with sister station XERY-AM in Arcelia. There would be no local FM station in Ciudad Altamirano until 2018, when XHSCBP-FM began broadcasting as a community station.
