= XHSCAK-FM =

Radio station in Taxco de Alarcón, Guerrero

Taxco de Alarcón, Guerrero; Mexico
- Frequency: 107.9 FM
- Branding: Plata Radio

Programming
- Format: Cultural/community radio

Ownership
- Owner: Domi Bello de Tenorio, A.C.
- Sister stations: XHDOM-FM Iguala, XHCSAH-TDT 10

History
- First air date: 2019
- Call sign meaning: (templated callsign)

Technical information
- Class: A

XHSCAK-FM is a community radio station broadcasting to Taxco de Alarcón, Guerrero on 107.9 FM. It is known as Plata Radio and owned by Domi Bello de Tenorio, A.C.

== History ==
Domi Bello de Tenorio filed for a station in Taxco on October 6, 2016. The concession was received on August 27, 2018, and the station began broadcasting in 2019.
