= XHAGR-FM =

Radio Fórmula station in Acapulco, Guerrero

XHAGR-FM/XEAGR-AM
- Acapulco, Guerrero; Mexico
- Frequencies: 810 kHz; 105.5 MHz
- Branding: Radio Fórmula

Programming
- Format: News/talk

Ownership
- Owner: Radio Fórmula; (Transmisora Regional Radio Fórmula, S.A. de C.V.)
- Sister stations: XHACA-FM

History
- First air date: January 25, 1994 (concession); November 1994 (FM)
- Call sign meaning: Acapulco, Guerrero

Technical information
- Class: B1 (FM); B (AM)
- Power: 7 kW day/0.6 kW night
- ERP: 10 kW
- HAAT: 437.3 m
- Transmitter coordinates: 16°49′15.17″N 99°50′06.52″W

Links
- Website: radioformulaguerrero.com

XHAGR-FM 105.5/XEAGR-AM 810 is a combo radio station in Acapulco, Guerrero. It is owned by and carries the Radio Fórmula network.

== History ==
XEAGR received its first concession on January 25, 1994. It was originally owned by Radio Creatividad, S.A., a subsidiary of Radiorama. That November, the station was authorized for its FM combo, XHAGR-FM 105.5. In 2000, Radio Fórmula bought the station.
