= XHVG-FM (Yucatán) =

Radio station in Mérida, Yucatán

XEVG-AM/XHVG-FM

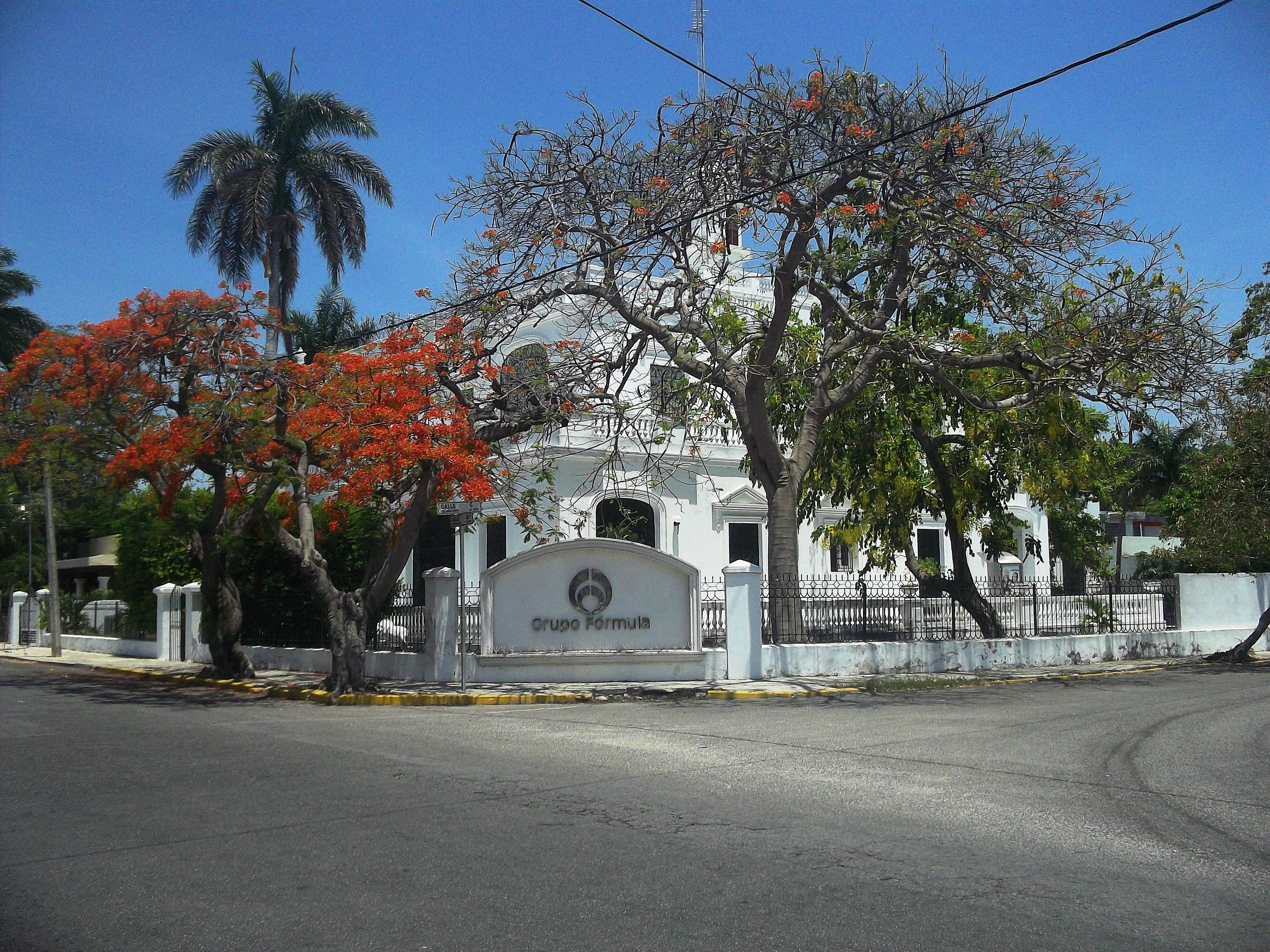
- Mérida, Yucatán; Mexico
- Broadcast area: Mérida, Yucatán
- Frequencies: 650 kHz; 94.5 (MHz)
- Branding: Radio Fórmula Yucatán (Primera Cadena)

Programming
- Format: News/talk

Ownership
- Owner: Radio Fórmula; (Transmisora Regional Radio Fórmula, S.A. de C.V.)
- Sister stations: XHZ-FM

History
- First air date: 1987

Technical information
- Power: AM: 2.5 kW day/.017 kW night
- ERP: FM: 10 kW
- Transmitter coordinates: 21°02′53.41″N 89°38′10.69″W

Links
- Website: radioformulayucatan.com

XHVG-FM 94.5/XEVG-AM 650 is a combo radio station in Mérida, Yucatán, Mexico, carrying Radio Fórmula programming.

== History ==
The concession for 650 AM was awarded in 1987 to Audio Panorama. The FM station was added in 1994.
