= XHUQ-FM =

Radio station in Zihuatanejo, Guerrero, Mexico

Zihuatanejo, Guerrero; Mexico
- Frequency: 101.9 MHz
- Branding: Variedades FM

Programming
- Format: Regional Mexican

Ownership
- Owner: Grupo Alfa Comunicaciones; (Jonathan Morales Moreno)

History
- First air date: April 28, 1968

Technical information
- Class: B1
- ERP: 15 kW
- HAAT: 114.8 meters
- Transmitter coordinates: 17°38′56.4″N 101°34′24.96″W

Links
- Website: www.variedadesfm.com.mx

XHUQ-FM is a radio station on 101.9 FM in Zihuatanejo, Guerrero. It is owned by Grupo Alfa Comunicaciones and is known as Variedades FM with a Regional Mexican format.

== History ==
XEUQ-AM 960 received its concession on April 25, 1968, and signed on three days later. It was owned by José Barajas Barajas and broadcast with 1,000 watts. In 1979, José Mario and Armando Morales Vallejo bought XEUQ; the former became the sole concessionaire in 1997.

In November 2010, XEUQ was cleared to move to FM as XHUQ-FM' 101.9. The migration took place in 2011.

In October 2016, a format switch moved the Ke Buena format, picked up just two months prior by XHZHO-FM 98.5, to XHUQ. The station had previously had the La Poderosa grupera format and picked up Los 40 upon disaffiliating from Radiorama.

The station became known as Radio Variedades in 2018 and later changed to Variedades FM.
