= XHRUV-FM =

Radio station of the Universidad Veracruzana

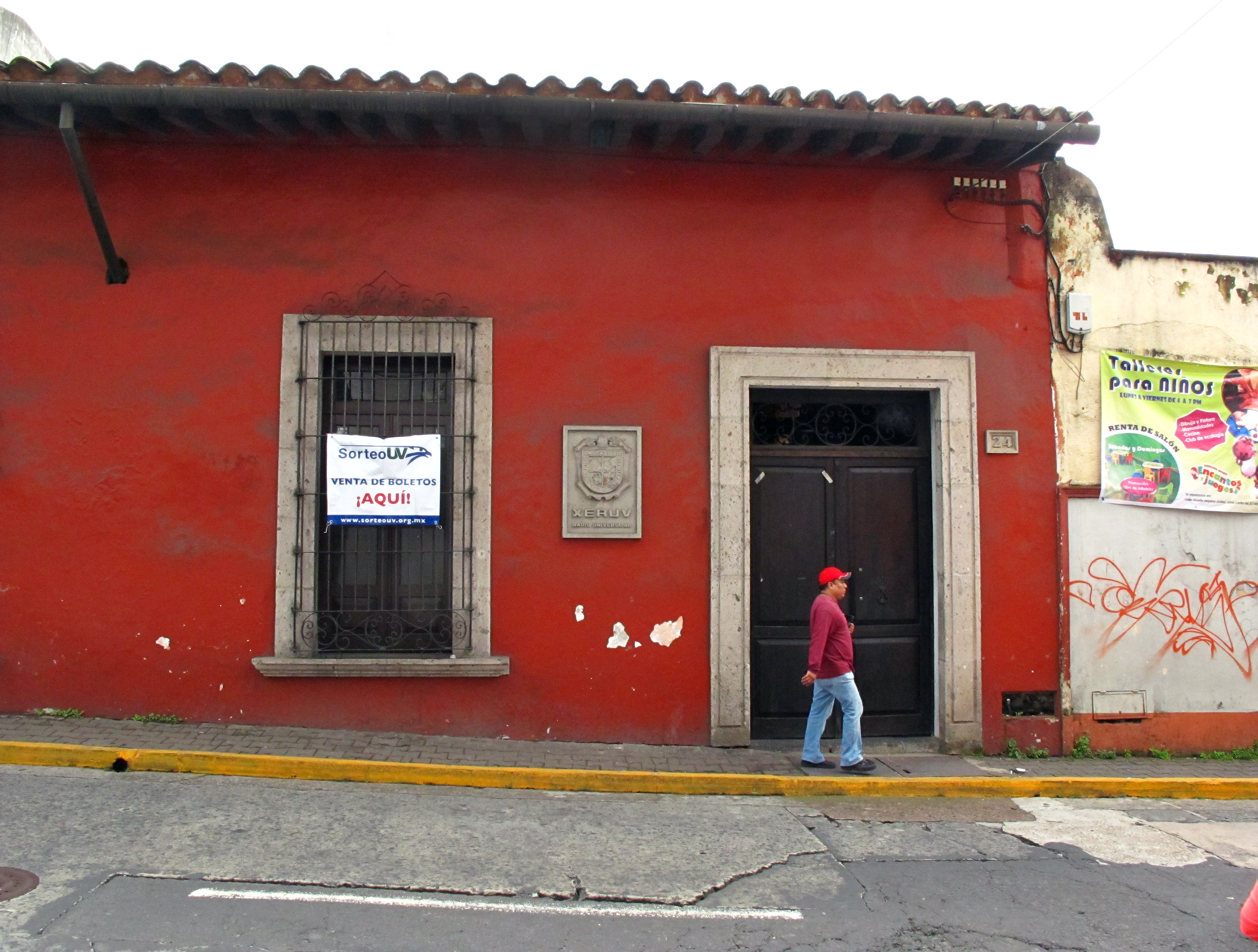
- Station building
- Xalapa, Veracruz; Mexico
- Broadcast area: Xalapa
- Frequency: 90.5 MHz
- Branding: Radio UV

Programming
- Language: Spanish
- Format: Public broadcasting (news, cultural shows, classical music)

Ownership
- Owner: Universidad Veracruzana
- Sister stations: XECPAD-AM 1300 kHz

History
- First air date: 1944 on AM; June 2014 on FM
- Former call signs: XEXB (1950s–1979?); XEJJ (1940s–1950s); XERUV-AM (AM station, to 2016)
- Former frequencies: 1400 kHz (1955–1979); 580 kHz (c. 1946–1955); 1550 kHz (1955–2016)
- Call sign meaning: "Radio Universidad Veracruzana"

Technical information
- Licensing authority: CRT
- Class: B1
- ERP: 25 kW
- HAAT: 59.2 m
- Transmitter coordinates: 19°35′09.9″N 96°59′57.4″W

Links
- Webcast: Web player mms://148.226.22.2/radiouv (direct stream)
- Website: www.uv.mx/radio

XHRUV-FM is the radio station of the Universidad Veracruzana in the Mexican state of Veracruz. It broadcasts from the state capital of Xalapa on 90.5 MHz. It uses the identification "Radio UV" and broadcasts a mix of news, cultural shows and classical music from its transmitter in Acajete, Veracruz. The station is on the air from 5 a.m. to 1 a.m.

XHRUV is the successor to XERUV-AM, which was a Class A clear-channel station on 1550 AM in Xalapa that is now silent.

== History ==
Radio UV was established on 15 September 1944, just days after the university itself, and was broadcasting with 200 watts on 580 kHz as XEJJ by 1946. By 1955, it increased power to 500 watts and moved to 1400 kHz, and began transmitting from the Cerro de Macuiltépetl with studios in the Xalapa Teatro del Estado in 1956. The programming was 12 hours of classical music. The call sign also changed to XEXB in the 1950s.

The station was shut down later, only transmitting music sporadically.

An agreement to swap frequencies with XEZL was made in 1965, with the goal of swapping frequencies and also using some of XEZL's schedule for cultural programming. By 1979, XERUV-AM it was a 10,000 watt station on 1550 kHz, and began transmitting 20 hours per day from the local Teatro del Estado on 2 March 1980 with programming that included talk, sports, and children's literature. The station gained space in the Casona de Clavijero in 1988, and a new transmitter location in Acajete, Veracruz in 1997.

In 2014, the station gained an FM sister station, XHRUV-FM 90.5 MHz, on a separate permit. The station signed on with test transmissions in June 2014.

In 2016, the IFT denied a long-pending request to renew XERUV-AM's permit, because the original renewal made in 2005 by then-station manager Fernando Escalante Sobrino was 15 days late. As a result, effective June 1, XERUV-AM went off the air, and XHRUV-FM was officially launched.
