= XHDOM-FM =

Community radio station in Iguala, Guerrero

Iguala, Guerrero; Mexico
- Frequency: 100.9 FM
- Branding: Iguala Radio

Programming
- Format: Cultural/community radio

Ownership
- Owner: Domi Bello de Tenorio, A.C.
- Sister stations: XHSCAK-FM Taxco de Alarcón

History
- First air date: April 2017
- Call sign meaning: DOMi Bello de Tenorio

Technical information
- Class: A
- ERP: 2.356 kW
- HAAT: -256.8 m
- Transmitter coordinates: 18°22′02.85″N 99°32′26.49″W

Links
- Website: igualaradio.com

XHDOM-FM is a community radio station broadcasting to Iguala, Guerrero on 100.9 FM. It is known as Iguala Radio and owned by Domi Bello de Tenorio, A.C.

== History ==
XHDOM came to air in April 2017 after receiving its social community concession on March 16 of the same year.
