= XERY-AM =

Radio station in Arcelia, Guerrero

- Arcelia, Guerrero; Mexico
- Frequency: 1450 AM
- Branding: La Poderosa Voz del Sur

Programming
- Format: Variety

Ownership
- Owner: Rafael García Tapia
- Sister stations: XEXY-AM

History
- First air date: November 25, 1971
- Call sign meaning: R from Rafael García Vergara

Technical information
- Class: B
- Power: 2 kW day 1 kW night
- Transmitter coordinates: 18°19′32″N 100°17′10″W

Links
- Website: radioarcelia1450.com

XERY-AM is a radio station on 1450 AM in Arcelia, Guerrero, Mexico. It is owned by Rafael García Tapia and known as La Poderosa Voz del Sur.

== History ==
XERY received its concession on November 25, 1971.

XERY was cleared for AM-AM migration in 2011 as XHRY-FM 94.3. In 2013, the legal representative for XERY opted to renounce its authorization to move to FM, leaving XERY as an AM-only station for the foreseeable future.
