= Clear-channel station =

Type of AM radio station

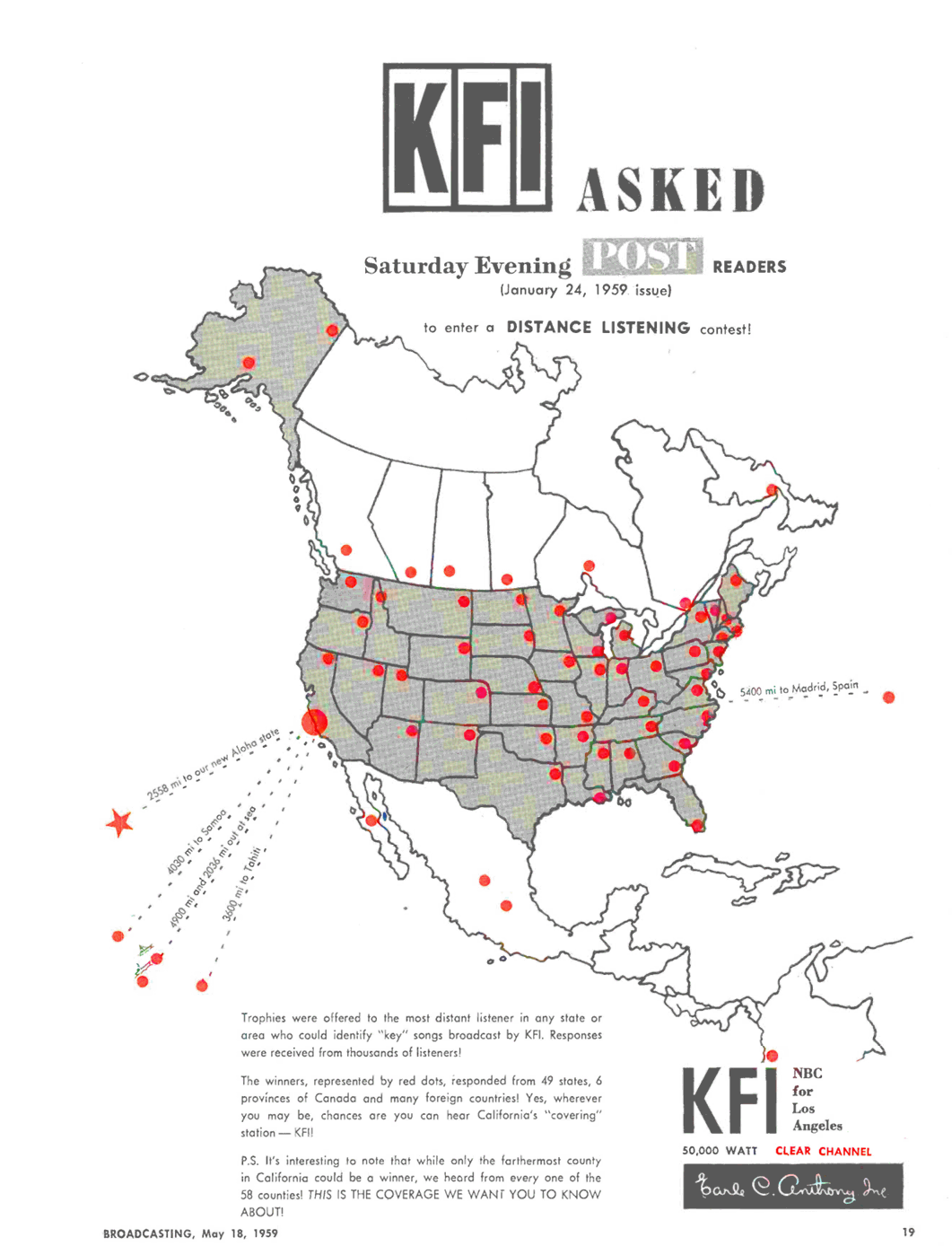
In 1959, a special program by a clear-channel station KFI in Los Angeles was used to record its extensive nighttime coverage.

A clear-channel station is a North American AM radio station that has the highest level of protection from interference from other stations, particularly from nighttime skywave signals. This classification exists to ensure the viability of cross-country or cross-continent radio service enforced through a series of treaties and statutory laws. Known as Class A stations since the 1983 adoption of the Regional Agreement for the Medium Frequency Broadcasting Service in Region 2 (Rio Agreement), they are occasionally still referred to by their former classifications of Class I-A (the highest classification), Class I-B (the next highest class), or Class I-N (for stations in Alaska too far away to cause interference to the primary clear-channel stations in the lower 48 states). The term "clear-channel" is used most often in the context of North America and the Caribbean, where the concept originated.

Since 1941, these stations have been required to maintain a transmitter power output of at least 10,000 watts to retain their status. Nearly all such stations in the United States, Canada and The Bahamas broadcast with 50,000 watts, with several clear-channel stations in Mexico going as high as 150,000 watts, and XEW in Mexico City having formerly operated with 250,000 watts for over 80 years before moving the transmitter and reducing to 100,000 watts in 2016. Cuba was originally included in the plan and had several stations given clear-channel status, but stopped participating after the Cuban Revolution of 1959.

== Description ==
60 medium wave frequencies were set aside in 1941 under the North American Regional Broadcasting Agreement (NARBA) for use by usually only one, although in some cases two or three, AM stations, covering a wide nighttime area via skywave propagation. These frequencies were known as the "clear channels", and the stations on them are thus clear-channel stations. NARBA set aside 37 Class I-A frequencies and 27 Class I-B frequencies. The Class I-N stations in Alaska shared those same frequencies. Where only one station was assigned to a clear channel, the treaty provides that it must operate with a nominal power of 50 kilowatts or more. These were for the most part Class I-A. Stations on the other clear channels, with two or more stations, must use between 10 kW and 50 kW, and most often use a directional antenna so as not to interfere with each other. In addition to the frequencies, the treaty also specified the specific locations where stations on Class I-B channels could be built.

Some of the original NARBA signatories, including the United States, Canada, and Mexico, have implemented bilateral agreements that supersede NARBA's terms, eliminating among other things the distinction between the two kinds of clear channel: the original "I-A" and "I-B" classes, and the newer, U.S.-only "I-N" class, which are now all included in class A. Classes "I-A" and "I-B" still mandate a minimum efficiency of 362.10 mV/m/kW at 1 km, whereas Class "I-N" is permitted to use the lower Class B minimum efficiency of 281.63 mV/m/kW at 1 km. There exist exceptions, where a former Class B station was elevated to Class A, yet it maintained its previous antenna system, or made only minor changes thereto.

Clear-channel stations, unlike other AM stations in North America, have protection from interference to their nighttime skywave secondary service area. Other stations are entitled, at most, to protection from nighttime interference in their primary service area—that which is covered by their groundwave signal.

Many stations beyond those listed in the treaty have been assigned to operate on a clear channel (and some had been long before NARBA came into effect in 1941). In most cases, those stations operate during the daytime only, so as not to interfere with the primary stations on those channels. Since the early 1980s, many such stations have been permitted to operate at night with such low power as to be deemed not to interfere; these stations are still considered "daytimers" and are not entitled to any protection from interference with their nighttime signals. Another group of stations, formerly known as class II stations, were licensed to operate on the former "I-B" clear channels with significant power at night, provided that they use directional antenna systems to minimize radiation towards the primary stations.

=== Daytimers ===
Daytimers (also known as daytime-only stations) are AM radio stations that are limited to broadcasting during the daytime only, as their signals would interfere with clear-channel and other radio stations at night, when solar radiation is reduced, and medium-frequency radio signals can propagate much farther. Such stations are allowed three manners of operation after sunset; to sign off the air completely until sunrise, reduce power (sometimes dramatically, to only a few watts), or switch to a nighttime-only frequency (such as the Detroit area's WNZK, which broadcasts on 690 kHz during the day, and on 680 kHz at night). Their broadcast class is Class D. A great number of these stations use FM translators to continue their broadcasts overnight, and some also broadcast on the internet and have separate streams that air when the station's over-the-air signal has signed off.

Daytime-only stations originated in 1928 shortly after General Order 40 was imposed. One of the first to do so was WKEN in Kenmore, New York (later WUFO). WKEN proposed the concept to avoid the then-common practice of having to share one frequency between multiple stations; under General Order 40, WKEN would have had to share its frequency with Buffalo station WKBW, and the daytime-only proposal allowed both stations their own frequency. WUFO remains a daytime-only station, albeit with a 24/7 FM translator introduced in mid-2017.

As of 2013, daytimers exist only in the United States and Mexico. The last Canadian daytime station, CKOT in Tillsonburg, Ontario, signed off on February 17 of that year after converting to the FM band. There were 61 daytimers in Mexico in 2015.

== List of clear-channel stations ==
The following two tables show all of the class-A stations in North America.

First is the Canada, Mexico, and contiguous United States table, for the former class I-A and class I-B stations. General Order 40 allocations are in bold.

Second is the Alaska table, for the former class I-N stations.

Under the most recent treaty, Mexican Class A stations that previously operated with 50 kW or less (but a minimum of 10 kW nights) may increase power to 100 kW days while retaining their 10 kW night operation. This created some anomalies where stations licensed for 10 kW during all hours could increase power to 100 kW days and 10 kW nights, unless a directional antenna system was installed for nights, in which case the maximum night power was 50 kW. Additionally, one Class B station that had been operating non-directionally with 100 kW days and 50 kW nights was required to reduce power to 50 kW during all hours.

Class A (former I-A/I-B) stations
kHz	Call sign	City of license	State / province	Coun- try	kW	Transmitter coordinates
540	CBK	Watrous	Saskatchewan	(Canada)	50	51.68°N 105.446667°W
540	XEWA	San Luis Potosí	San Luis Potosí	(Mexico)	150	22.157944°N 100.92625°W
640	CBN	St. John's	Newfoundland and Labrador	(Canada)	10	47.568889°N 52.8125°W
640	**KFI**	Los Angeles	California	(United States)	50	33.879722°N 118.013056°W
650	**WSM**	Nashville	Tennessee	(United States)	50	35.998194°N 86.790833°W
660	**WFAN**	New York City	New York	(United States)	50	40.859722°N 73.785278°W
670	**WSCR**	Chicago	Illinois	(United States)	50	41.934167°N 88.073333°W
680	**KNBR**	San Francisco	California	(United States)	50	37.547222°N 122.233333°W
690	CKGM (Note: 690 kHz at Montreal was originally assigned under NARBA to CBF (that station migrated to FM in 1998), and was later reused by CINF; after CINF closed in January 2010, CKGM applied for and was granted the frequency, and moved from 990 kHz to 690 kHz in September 2012.)	Montreal	Quebec	(Canada)	50	45.2953°N 73.7217°W
690	XEWW	Tijuana	Baja California	(Mexico)	77.5 / 50	32.297778°N 117.03°W
700	**WLW**	Cincinnati	Ohio	(United States)	50	39.353056°N 84.325°W
710	KIRO	Seattle	Washington	(United States)	50	47.398611°N 122.433333°W
710	**WOR**	New York City	New York	(United States)	50	40.7975°N 74.09°W
720	**WGN**	Chicago	Illinois	(United States)	50	42.011667°N 88.035278°W
730	CKAC	Montreal	Quebec	(Canada)	50	45.5139°N 73.9733°W
730	XEX	Mexico City	Mexico City	(Mexico)	60	19.36505°N 98.957703°W
740	CFZM (Note: 740 kHz was used by CBC Radio One's CBL in Toronto until 2000 when the station moved to 99.1 FM. CFZM, known at the time as CHWO, acquired 740 in 2001.)	Toronto	Ontario	(Canada)	50	43.575°N 79.817222°W
750	**WSB**	Atlanta	Georgia	(United States)	50	33.843889°N 84.253333°W
760	**WJR**	Detroit	Michigan	(United States)	50	42.168056°N 83.215°W
770	**WABC**	New York City	New York	(United States)	50	40.880556°N 74.069444°W
780	**WBBM**	Chicago	Illinois	(United States)	35 / 42	41.990556°N 88.027778°W
800	XEROK	Ciudad Juárez	Chihuahua	(Mexico)	50	31.695556°N 106.383611°W
810	**KSFO**	San Francisco	California	(United States)	50	37.526389°N 122.100556°W
810	WGY	Schenectady	New York	(United States)	50	42.792336°N 74.011937°W
820	**WBAP**	Fort Worth	Texas	(United States)	50	32.610556°N 97.167778°W
830	**WCCO**	Minneapolis	Minnesota	(United States)	50	45.178889°N 93.349722°W
840	**WHAS**	Louisville	Kentucky	(United States)	50	38.261111°N 85.428611°W
850	**KOA**	Denver	Colorado	(United States)	50	39.506111°N 104.765833°W
860	CJBC	Toronto	Ontario	(Canada)	50	43.575°N 79.8175°W
870	**WWL**	New Orleans	Louisiana	(United States)	50	29.837222°N 90.131944°W
880	**WHSQ**	New York City	New York	(United States)	50	40.859806°N 73.785444°W
890	**WLS**	Chicago	Illinois	(United States)	50	41.555833°N 87.848333°W
900	CKBI	Prince Albert	Saskatchewan	(Canada)	10	53.2008°N 105.7538°W
900	XEW	Mexico City	Mexico City	(Mexico)	100	19.36505°N 98.957703°W
920	CKNW (Note: 920 kHz is not a clear channel frequency, it is regional. Never the less, CKNW, which broadcasts at 50,000 watts full time, using a directional antenna, was promoted to Class A status.)	Vancouver	British Columbia	(Canada)	50	49.161554°N 122.731892°W
940	CFNV (Note: 940 kHz at Montreal was originally assigned under NARBA to CBM (that station migrated to FM in 1998), and was later reused by CINW, which ceased operations in 2010. Despite leaving the air, it remained notified to the U.S. as a class-A allotment. A new license has since been granted to Tietolman-Tétrault-Pancholy Media (TTP) to broadcast a French news-talk format at 940 AM by the CRTC. After numerous delays, the station began broadcasting a series of test tones intermittently on October 26, 2016. Official testing began on November 16, 2016, with music and recorded announcements with a phone number to report signal interference. Although the station was given a deadline of November 21, 2016, by the CRTC to launch its French news-talk format, the station has yet to do so.)	Montreal	Quebec	(Canada)	50	45.3928°N 73.6981°W
940	XEQ	Mexico City	Mexico City	(Mexico)	30	19.360217°N 98.992194°W
990	CBW	Winnipeg	Manitoba	(Canada)	50 / 46	49.836111°N 97.512778°W
990	CBY	Corner Brook	Newfoundland and Labrador	(Canada)	10	48.9328°N 57.9061°W
1000	**KNWN**	Seattle	Washington	(United States)	50	47.463611°N 122.440833°W
1000	WMVP	Chicago	Illinois	(United States)	50	41.818056°N 87.988333°W
1000	XEOY	Mexico City	Mexico City	(Mexico)	50 / 10	19.3883°N 99.1247°W
1010	CBR	Calgary	Alberta	(Canada)	50	50.9380°N 113.9616°W
1010	CFRB	Toronto	Ontario	(Canada)	50	43.5110°N 79.6300°W
1020	**KDKA**	Pittsburgh	Pennsylvania	(United States)	50	40.55948°N 79.9526°W
1030	**WBZ**	Boston	Massachusetts	(United States)	50	42.2788°N 70.8761°W
1040	**WHO**	Des Moines	Iowa	(United States)	50	41.652778°N 93.350278°W
1050	XEG	Monterrey	Nuevo León	(Mexico)	100	25.698056°N 100.175°W
1060	**KYW**	Philadelphia	Pennsylvania	(United States)	50	40.103333°N 75.248889°W
1060	XECPAE	Mexico City	Mexico City	(Mexico)	100 / 20	19.363972°N 99.027194°W
1070	**KNX**	Los Angeles	California	(United States)	50	33.859722°N 118.349722°W
1080	KRLD	Dallas	Texas	(United States)	50	32.890281°N 96.645561°W
1080	WTIC	Hartford	Connecticut	(United States)	50	41.7775°N 72.805278°W
1090	WBAL	Baltimore	Maryland	(United States)	50	39.375833°N 76.7725°W
1090	XEPRS	Rancho del Mar, Rosarito	Baja California	(Mexico)	50	32.402278°N 117.086722°W
1100	**WTAM**	Cleveland	Ohio	(United States)	50	41.280556°N 81.622778°W
1110	KFAB	Omaha	Nebraska	(United States)	50	41.119722°N 96.001667°W
1110	**WBT**	Charlotte	North Carolina	(United States)	50	35.132222°N 80.889722°W
1120	**KMOX**	St. Louis	Missouri	(United States)	50	38.722778°N 90.055278°W
1130	CKWX	Vancouver	British Columbia	(Canada)	50	
1130	KWKH	Shreveport	Louisiana	(United States)	50	32.705°N 93.881944°W
1130	**WBBR**	New York City	New York	(United States)	50	40.810833°N 74.04°W
1140	**WRVA**	Richmond	Virginia	(United States)	50	37.403611°N 77.316389°W
1140	XEMR	Monterrey	Nuevo León	(Mexico)	50	25.764444°N 100.253056°W
1160	**KSL**	Salt Lake City	Utah	(United States)	50	40.78°N 112.0975°W
1170	KOTV	Tulsa	Oklahoma	(United States)	50	36.146944°N 95.8075°W
1170	WWVA	Wheeling	West Virginia	(United States)	50	40.101944°N 80.867222°W
1180	**WHAM**	Rochester	New York	(United States)	50	43.081944°N 77.725°W
1190	**KEX**	Portland	Oregon	(United States)	50	45.422222°N 122.565833°W
1200	**WOAI**	San Antonio	Texas	(United States)	50	29.502111°N 98.128806°W
1210	**WPHT**	Philadelphia	Pennsylvania	(United States)	50	39.979444°N 74.986944°W
1220	XEB	Mexico City	Mexico City	(Mexico)	100	19.308611°N 99.058889°W
1500	KSTP	Saint Paul	Minnesota	(United States)	50	45.025556°N 93.051667°W
1500	WFED	Washington, D.C.	Washington, D.C.	(United States)	50	39.041944°N 77.046389°W
1510	WLAC	Nashville	Tennessee	(United States)	50	36.271944°N 86.757778°W
1520	KOKC	Oklahoma City	Oklahoma	(United States)	50	35.333333°N 97.504444°W
1520	WWKB	Buffalo	New York	(United States)	50	42.769444°N 78.842778°W
1530	KFBK	Sacramento	California	(United States)	50	38.848333°N 121.482778°W
1530	WCKY	Cincinnati	Ohio	(United States)	50	39.065278°N 84.6075°W
1540	KXEL	Waterloo	Iowa	(United States)	50	42.18°N 92.310556°W
1540	ZNS-1	Nassau	New Providence	(The Bahamas)	50	25.003917°N 77.350333°W
1550	CBEF (Note: 1550 kHz was originally CBE (AM), which shut down the AM station after moving to 97.5 CBEW-FM in 2011. On November 1, 2012, CBEF, traditionally on 540 kHz, also started broadcasting on the same AM transmitter and frequency that CBE had used.)	Windsor	Ontario	(Canada)	10	42.2156°N 82.9208°W
1560	KNZR (Note: KNZR is the only U.S. class-A station licensed to operate with less than 50 kilowatts full-time.)	Bakersfield	California	(United States)	25 / 10	35.308333°N 119.046111°W
1560	WFME (Note: WFME is currently operating with 1,000 watts under a special temporary authority after airing on a new transmitter site in West Orange, New Jersey. It is currently unknown if the station will return as a Clear-channel station.)	New York City	New York	(United States)	50	40.716667°N 73.917778°W
1570	XERF	Ciudad Acuña	Coahuila	(Mexico)	100	29.35°N 101.033333°W
1580	CKDO (Note: 1580 kHz was originally used by CBJ in Chicoutimi, Quebec. After that station moved to FM in 1999, CHUC applied for and was granted 1580 kHz in Cobourg, Ontario, with 10 kW, but chose instead to move to FM itself (despite being notified to the U.S. as an existing station on 1580). CKDO moved from 1350 to 1580 kHz on August 13, 2006, and became that day a class A station using 10 kW. U.S. FCC record is at)	Oshawa	Ontario	(Canada)	10	43.871944°N 78.764722°W

Alaskan class A (former class I-N) stations
kHz	Call sign	City of license	Nat- ion	kW	Transmitter coordinates
640	KYUK	Bethel	(United States)	10	60.78175°N 161.885639°W
650	KENI	Anchorage	(United States)	50	61.166111°N 149.826111°W
660	KFAR	Fairbanks	(United States)	10	64.808056°N 147.492778°W
670	KDLG	Dillingham	(United States)	10	59.045278°N 158.451944°W
680	KBRW	Barrow	(United States)	10	71.256667°N 156.525556°W
700	KBYR	Anchorage	(United States)	10	61.206944°N 149.922222°W
720	KOTZ	Kotzebue	(United States)	10	66.839444°N 162.568056°W
750	KFQD	Anchorage	(United States)	50	61.338333°N 150.034167°W
770	KCHU	Valdez	(United States)	9.7	61.111111°N 146.260833°W
780	KNOM	Nome	(United States)	25 / 14	64.487778°N 165.299444°W
820	KCBF	Fairbanks	(United States)	10	64.878889°N 147.668333°W
850	KICY	Nome	(United States)	50	64.4875°N 165.314722°W
890	KBBI	Homer	(United States)	10	59.670556°N 151.443889°W
1020	KVNT	Eagle River	(United States)	10	61.483889°N 149.762222°W
1080	KOAN	Anchorage	(United States)	10	61.12°N 149.895278°W
1170	KJNP	North Pole	(United States)	50 / 21	64.759444°N 147.323889°W

== List of former clear-channel stations ==
Freq. (kHz)	Call sign	City of license	State / province	Country	Fate
540	CBT	Grand Falls-Windsor	Newfoundland	(Canada)	Moved to FM on December 31, 2022.
850	XETQ-AM	Ixhuatlancillo	Veracruz	(Mexico)	Migrated to FM as XHTQ-FM in 2013. At its height XETQ was authorized for 100 kW day/50 kW night. In the 1990s it lowered its power to 10 kW day/1 kW night.
1070	CBA	Moncton	New Brunswick	(Canada)	Moved to FM in April 2008. Canada has not withdrawn the international notification for CBA.
1090	KAAY	Little Rock	Arkansas	(United States)	Downgraded to class B in 2026 by reducing night power to 3.4 kilowatts with a two tower directional antenna.
1190	WOWO	Fort Wayne	Indiana	(United States)	Downgraded to class B in 1998 by reducing night power to 9.8 kilowatts with a three tower directional antenna; Inner City Broadcasting purchased WOWO so that its station in New York, WLIB, could remain on air 24 hours a day. WOWO was later purchased by Pathfinder Communications, the current owners.
1190	XEWK	Guadalajara	Jalisco	(Mexico)	Migrated to FM. The AM station was turned off in 2021.
1510	KGA	Spokane	Washington	(United States)	Downgraded to class B in 2011 to make room for co-channel sister station KSFN, Piedmont, California, reducing night power to 15 kW
1550	XERUV-AM	Xalapa	Veracruz	(Mexico)	A bad permit renewal, made in 2005, required this station to shut down in June 2016. When the university applied to resume operation on AM, it was denied, and the station moved to FM and launched XHRUV-FM on a frequency of 90.5 MHz on June 1, 2016.

== History ==
In the early days of radio, regulators had difficulty reducing interference between stations. There were two major limitations: a lack of good frequency control during the 1920s, resulting in heterodyne tones that were encountered far beyond the range of understandable audio, and no directional antennas or skywave-suppressing vertical antennas until the early 1930s. The problem was much more severe at night, when skywave signals expanded station signal coverage to hundreds of kilometers. However, with most stations located at urban locations, quality skywave service was considered to be important for providing nighttime reception to the extensive rural regions.

For the U.S., a form of clear channels first appeared in 1923 when the Commerce Department started moving stations which had previously shared three (initially two) frequencies (two for entertainment stations, one for "weather and crop reports") onto a band of frequencies from 550 to 1350 kHz, which was later extended to 1500 kHz, with 550 to 1070 kHz reserved for higher powered "Class B" stations. Many of the Class B frequencies were assigned to a single station, although a few were used on both the East and West coasts, which were considered far enough apart to limit interference. Class B stations with transmitters located in population centers were limited to 1,000 watts, although stations that operated transmitters at remote sites were permitted to use up to 5,000 watts.

Problems intensified in the summer of 1926, when a successful challenge was made by station WJAZ to the government's authority, under the Radio Act of 1912, to assign station transmitting frequencies and powers. This led to unrestricted expansion of the number of stations to 732, and increased the number of stations operating on same frequency. Moreover, previously stations had been assigned to transmitting frequencies of multiples of 10 kHz, which largely eliminated heterodynes from adjacent frequencies. However, during the lapse in regulation, some stations relocated to non-standard "split frequencies", increasing heterodyne interference.

The Federal Radio Commission (FRC) was formed in March 1927, and one of its key tasks was to reorganize the chaotic broadcast band. A May 1927 reallocation began the process, in part by eliminating "split frequency" operations. A report on the FRC's ongoing work was issued December 1, 1927, which reviewed operations on 600 to 1000 kHz, and divided these frequencies into ones that were considered "clear" and "unclear". Its 1928 implementation of General Order 32 was only partially successful in reducing the number of stations. On November 11, 1928, the FRC implemented General Order 40, which classified AM band frequencies as Local, Regional or Clear. Under restrictions imposed by the Davis Amendment, eight clear channels were assigned to each of 5 U.S. regions. This classification also reserved a small number of frequencies for use by Canada. The maximum power for clear channel stations was gradually increased to 50,000 watts: additionally there were some short-lived experiments with 250–500 kilowatt "super-power" operations, most prominently by WLW in Cincinnati, Ohio

The Federal Radio Commission was replaced by the Federal Communications Commission (FCC) in 1934. There was debate in Washington, D.C., and in the U.S. broadcasting industry, over whether continuation of the clear-channel system was justifiable. The licensees of clear-channel stations argued that, without their special status, many rural areas would receive no radio service at all. Rural broadcasters pointed out that most of the clear-channel stations were licensed to serve large cities on the two coasts, which made little sense for a service that was meant to provide radio to the vast rural areas in the middle of the country. On June 13, 1938, the U.S. Senate adopted resolution 294, sponsored by Burton K. Wheeler (D-Montana), which stated that it was the "sense of the Senate... that the Federal Communications Commission should not adopt or promulgate rules to permit or otherwise allow any station operating on a frequency in the standard broadcast band (550 to 1600 kilocycles) to operate on a regular or other basis with power in excess of 50 kilowatts". However, the clear-channel licensees argued that a 50,000 watt limit in the U.S. should be lifted. They pointed to successful experiments made by WLW in Cincinnati before World War II, and in later years successful implementation by state broadcasters in Europe and the Middle East, as evidence that this would work and improve the service received by most Americans. Other broadcasters, particularly in the western states, argued to the contrary; that if the special status of the clear-channel stations was eliminated, they would be able to build facilities to provide local service to those rural "dark areas".

The clear channel standards were continued by the March 1941 adoption of the North American Regional Broadcasting Agreement, during which most stations shifted frequencies, in order to increase the number of Canadian clear channel assignments, as well as provide clear channels to Mexico and the Bahamas. Because FM and TV stations did not yet exist, the FCC's main intent for the clear-channel assignments was to provide reliable radio service to the thousands of Americans who lived in the vast rural areas of the United States. As a result, these stations usually reached large portions of North America at night. Radio fans (and staff at those stations) often affectionately call such stations "flamethrowers" or "blowtorches" because of their high power, and boast about their reach by a combined state and provincial count of their coverage area. One of the most outspoken of the small-town broadcasters, Ed Craney of KGIR in Butte, Montana, went so far as to apply to move his station, then on the 1370 kHz regional channel, to a class I-A signal on 660 kHz, asking the FCC to downgrade the NBC New York flagship, WEAF (now WFAN), to make way for the Butte station. The FCC denied Craney's petition.

After 1941, several clear-channel stations applied for power increases to between 500 and 750 kW; with dissemination of national defense information cited as one reason this would be in the public interest. In October 1941, the FCC's engineering department presented a report on a complete reorganization of the clear-channel service; the report considered the possibility of "some 25 superpower stations of 500,000 watts or more, strategically located to provide maximum service" (as Broadcasting described it), and suggested that stations would have to be relocated away from the east and west coasts in such a scenario, as coastal stations waste energy over the oceans. One complication the FCC considered was the 1938 Wheeler resolution suggestion that stations be limited to 50 kW.

One station, KOB in Albuquerque, New Mexico, fought a long legal battle against the FCC and New York's WABC for the right to move from a regional channel to a clear channel, 770 kHz, arguing that the New York signal was so weak in the mountain west that it served no one there. KOB eventually won the argument in the late 1960s; it and several other western stations were allowed to move to eastern clear channels. (Western clear channels, such as 680 in San Francisco, had been "duplicated" in the eastern states for many years.)

These new Class II-A assignments began what would later be called "the breakdown of the clear channels".

Initial Thirteen Class II-A Allocations by the FCC in 1961
Freq.	Class I-A station	Proposed Allocation	Class II-A Assignment
670	WMAQ Chicago, Illinois	Idaho	KBOI Boise, Idaho
720	WGN Chicago, Illinois	Nevada or Idaho	KDWN Las Vegas, Nevada (deleted March 22, 2024)
750	WSB Atlanta, Georgia	KFQD Anchorage, Alaska	KFQD Anchorage, Alaska (from 730 kHz.)
760	WJR Detroit, Michigan	KFMB San Diego, California	KFMB San Diego, California (from 540 kHz.)
780	WBBM Chicago, Illinois	Nevada	KKOH Reno, Nevada
880	WCBS New York, New York	North Dakota, South Dakota or Nebraska	KRVN Lexington, Nebraska
890	WLS Chicago, Illinois	Utah	KDXU Saint George, Utah
1020	KDKA Pittsburgh, Pennsylvania	New Mexico	KCKN Roswell, New Mexico
1030	WBZ Boston, Massachusetts	Wyoming	KTWO Casper, Wyoming
1100	KYW Cleveland, Ohio	Colorado	KNZZ Grand Junction, Colorado
1120	KMOX Saint Louis, Missouri	California or Oregon	KPNW Eugene, Oregon
1180	WHAM Rochester, New York	Montana.	KOFI Kalispell, Montana
1210	WCAU Philadelphia, Pennsylvania	Kansas, Nebraska or Oklahoma	KGYN Guymon, Oklahoma

The class I-A station owners' proposal to increase power fifteen-fold was not immediately quashed, but the new II-A stations would make it effectively impossible for stations on the duplicated channels to do so, and the owners eventually lost interest. That proposal was finally taken off the FCC's docket in the late 1970s.

On May 29, 1980, the FCC voted to limit the protection for all clear-channel stations to a 750-mile (1,207 km) radius around the transmitter. Stations on those frequencies outside the area of protection were no longer required to sign off or power down after sundown.

In 1987, the FCC changed its rules to prohibit applications for new "class-D" stations. (Class-D stations have night power between zero and 250 watts, and frequently operate on clear channels.) However, any existing station could voluntarily relinquish nighttime authority, thereby becoming a class-D, and several have done so since the rule change.

== See also ==
- Regulation of radio broadcast in the United States
- Clear Channel Communications
- MW DX
