= XHEVP-FM =

Radio station in Acapulco, Guerrero, Mexico

- Acapulco, Guerrero; Mexico
- Frequency: 95.3 MHz
- Branding: La Bestia Grupera

Programming
- Format: Grupera

Ownership
- Owner: Grupo Audiorama Comunicaciones; (XEVP-AM, S.A. de C.V.)
- Sister stations: XHKJ-FM, XHACD-FM, XHNU-FM, XHPO-FM

History
- First air date: July 28, 1987
- Former call signs: XEVP-AM
- Former frequencies: 1030 kHz

Technical information
- Class: B1
- ERP: 15 kW
- HAAT: 381 m
- Transmitter coordinates: 16°52′25.93″N 99°51′00.8″W

Links
- Webcast: Listen live
- Website: audiorama.mx

XHEVP-FM is a radio station on 95.3 FM in Acapulco, Guerrero, Mexico. It is owned by Grupo Audiorama Comunicaciones and carries regional Mexican format known as La Bestia Grupera.

== History ==
XEVP-AM 1030 came to air on July 28, 1987, four months earlier after the concession was awarded on March 4. It was owned by Radiorama subsidiary Radio Universo, S.A., and it broadcast as a daytimer with 1 kW. In 1993, it was allowed to begin nighttime broadcasts with 500 watts. In the mid-2000s, XEVP became an affiliate of the W Radio news/talk format, replacing its longtime Radio Fiesta format.

In November 2010, XEVP was cleared to move to FM as XHEVP-FM 95.3. In 2013, XHEVP switched to a grupera format as La Bestia Grupera.
