= XHPO-FM =

- Acapulco, Guerrero; Mexico
- Frequency: 103.9 MHz
- Branding: Buenísima

Programming
- Format: Spanish tropical music

Ownership
- Owner: Grupo Radiorama; (XHPO-FM, S.A. de C.V.)
- Operator: Grupo Audiorama Comunicaciones
- Sister stations: XHACD-FM, XHEVP-FM, XHKJ-FM, XHNU-FM

History
- First air date: November 28, 1988 (concession)

Technical information
- ERP: 31 kW

XHPO-FM is a radio station on 103.9 FM in Acapulco, Guerrero. It is owned by Grupo Radiorama and operated by Grupo Audiorama Comunicaciones, and carries a Spanish-language tropical music format known as Buenísima.

== History ==
Logo with the Ke Buena format used until 2017

XHPO received its concession on November 28, 1988. It was originally owned by Televisa Radio and known as Ke Buena with a Regional Mexican format, until it was sold to Grupo Radiorama in 2017 and rebranded as Buenísima with a tropical music format.
