= XHNS-FM =

Radio station in Acapulco, Guerrero, Mexico

Acapulco, Guerrero; Mexico
- Frequency: 96.9 MHz
- Branding: Radio Guerrero

Programming
- Format: News/talk

Ownership
- Owner: Radiorama; (Estéreo Ritmo, S.A. de C.V.)
- Operator: Grupo Radio Visión
- Sister stations: XHKOK-FM, XHPA-FM, XHCI-FM

History
- First air date: September 13, 1973 (concession)

Technical information
- ERP: 30.5 kW

Links
- Webcast: Listen live
- Website: radiovision.mx

XHNS-FM is a radio station on 96.9 FM in Acapulco, Guerrero, Mexico. It is owned by Grupo Radiorama and operated by Grupo Radio Visión as a news/talk-formatted station known as Radio Guerrero.

== History ==
XHNS received its concession on September 13, 1973. It was owned by Eduardo Morales Díaz de la Vega and originally had an ERP of 3.57 kW. Díaz de la Vega sold XHNS to Estéreo Ritmo, S.A., in August 1985, and by the 1990s, the station had an ERP of 9 kW.

Logo used 2015–2021 with the La Mas Picuda format

Starting January 3, 2022, the four Radiorama stations in Acapulco (XHKOK, XHCI, XHNS, and XHPA) were leased to a new operator, Grupo Radio Visión. XHNS took on the W Radio format from Radiópolis.

On April 1, 2024, Grupo Radio Visión and Radiópolis parted ways. XHNS continued with its existing talk format under the new name Radio Guerrero.
