= XHPA-FM =

Radio station in Acapulco, Guerrero, Mexico

- Acapulco, Guerrero; Mexico
- Frequency: 93.7 MHz
- Branding: La Poderosa

Programming
- Format: Regional Mexican

Ownership
- Owner: Grupo Radiorama; (Radio Concierto Acapulco, S.A. de C.V.)
- Operator: Grupo Radio Comunicación
- Sister stations: XHKOK-FM, XHNS-FM, XHCI-FM

History
- First air date: August 15, 1969 (concession)

Technical information
- ERP: 30.5 kW

Links
- Webcast: Listen live
- Website: gruporadiocomunicacion.com

XHPA-FM is a radio station on 93.7 FM in Acapulco, Guerrero. It is owned by Grupo Radiorama and operated by Grupo Radio Comunicación, and known as La Poderosa with a Regional Mexican format.

== History ==
XHPA received its concession on August 15, 1969.

Logo used 2014–2021 with the Fiesta Mexicana format

Starting January 3, 2022, the four Radiorama stations in Acapulco (XHKOK, XHCI, XHNS, and XHPA) were leased to a new operator, Grupo Radio Visión. XHPA took on the La Ke Buena Regional Mexican format from Radiópolis.

On April 1, 2024, Grupo Radio Visión dropped all Radiópolis formats. XHPA continued in the Regional Mexican format and was rebranded as La Más Picuda. Then in March 2025, the station leased to Grupo Radio Comunicación and changed names to La Poderosa.
