= Regional Agreement for the Medium Frequency Broadcasting Service in Region 2 =

International radio treaty

ITU's Region 2 encompasses North and South America Region 1 Region 2 Region 3

The Regional Agreement for the Medium Frequency Broadcasting Service in Region 2, commonly known as the Rio Agreement, is an international treaty defining standards for AM band (mediumwave) radio stations. It was signed in Rio de Janeiro, Brazil, on 19 December 1981 and took effect on 1 July 1983 at 08:00 UTC. The agreement was the result of a conference organized by the International Telecommunication Union (ITU), and set standards for ITU Region 2, covering the western hemisphere countries located in North America, South America, and the Caribbean.

A major feature of the agreement was the division of stations into three main classifications: Class A, normally limited to 100 kilowatts (kW) daytime and 50 kW at night; Class B, limited to 50 kW, and Class C, limited to a nighttime power of 1 kW. Individual nations were also authorized to make further refinements based on their particular circumstances.
