= XHACD-FM =

Radio station in Acapulco, Guerrero, Mexico

Acapulco, Guerrero; Mexico
- Frequency: 92.1 MHz
- Branding: Voces 92.1

Programming
- Format: news/English contemporary music

Ownership
- Owner: Grupo Radiorama; (Radio Mundo de Acapulco, S.A.)
- Operator: Grupo Audiorama Comunicaciones
- Sister stations: XHKJ-FM, XHNU-FM, XHEVP-FM, XHPO-FM

History
- First air date: January 25, 1972 (concession)
- Call sign meaning: "Acapulco"

Technical information
- ERP: 25 kW
- HAAT: 345.33 m
- Transmitter coordinates: 16°52′25.9″N 99°51′00.8″W

XHACD-FM is a radio station on 92.1 FM in Acapulco, Guerrero, Mexico. It is owned by Grupo Radiorama and operated by Grupo Audiorama Comunicaciones with a news/English contemporary music format known as "Voces 92.1".

== History ==
Logo used 2016–17 with the Los 40 format

Logo used 2017–19 with the Retro FM format

XEACD-AM 550 received its concession on January 25, 1972. The 500-watt station, initially owned by Ruben Nava del Villar Sánchez, was sold to Radio Mundo de Acapulco, S.A. within five years. The concessionaire name references the Radio Mundo standards format, similar to XEN-AM in Mexico City, that XEACD ran in its early years.

XEACD was cleared for AM-FM migration in 2010 as XHACD-FM 92.1.

In 2017, the station changed from Los 40 to "Retro FM", a Spanish classic hits format, as part of a wider breakup between Audiorama and Televisa Radio.

On November 1, 2019, the station's Retro format ended and it began broadcasting the talk programming of Heraldo Radio. Heraldo programming ended on July 1, 2021, and the station remained in the news/talk format with local programming as "Voces".
