= List of radio stations in Alaska =

The following is a list of FCC-licensed radio stations in the U.S. state of Alaska, which can be sorted by their call signs, frequencies, cities of license, licensees, and programming formats.

== List of radio stations ==
| Call sign | Frequency | City of license | Licensee | Format |
|---|---|---|---|---|
| KAAC | 99.7 FM | Utqiagvik | Adventist Radio Alaska Corporation | Religious |
| KABN | 960 AM | Kenai | Alaska Broadcast Television, Inc. | |
| KAEB | 91.9 FM | Sand Point | Aleutian Peninsula Broadcasting, Inc. | Variety |
| KAFC | 93.7 FM | Anchorage | Christian Broadcasting, Inc. | Contemporary Christian |
| KAGV | 1110 AM | Big Lake | Voice for Christ Ministries, Inc. | Religious |
| KAKD | 104.9 FM | Dillingham | Bay Broadcasting Company | Contemporary Christian/Southern gospel |
| KAKI | 88.1 FM | Juneau | Educational Media Foundation | Christian Contemporary Worship Music (Air1) |
| KAKL | 88.5 FM | Anchorage | Educational Media Foundation | Contemporary Christian (K-Love) |
| KAKN | 100.9 FM | Naknek | Bay Broadcasting Company | Contemporary Christian/Southern gospel |
| KAKQ-FM | 101.1 FM | Fairbanks | iHM Licenses, LLC | Hot AC |
| KALG | 98.1 FM | Kaltag | Big River Public Broadcasting Corporation | Public Radio |
| KAMC-FM | 90.7 FM | Soldotna | Alaska Multi Culture Corp. | Variety |
| KASH-FM | 107.5 FM | Anchorage | iHM Licenses, LLC | Country |
| KATB | 89.3 FM | Anchorage | Christian Broadcasting, Inc. | Religious |
| KAUK | 91.7 FM | Juneau | KTOO Public Media | Public Radio |
| KAVM | 105.1 FM | Cold Bay | Alaska Village Missions, Inc. | Religious |
| KAYO | 100.9 FM | Wasilla | Alpha Media Licensee LLC | Classic country |
| KBBI | 890 AM | Homer | Kachemak Bay Broadcasting Inc | Public Radio |
| KBBO-FM | 92.1 FM | Houston | OMG FCC Licenses LLC | Variety Hits |
| KBFX | 100.5 FM | Anchorage | iHM Licenses, LLC | Classic rock |
| KBJZ-LP | 94.1 FM | Juneau | Gastineau Broadcasting Corporation | Jazz/Blues |
| KBKO | 88.3 FM | Kodiak | Sacred Heart Radio, Inc. | Catholic |
| KBOU | 95.9 FM | Tok | Our Fathers World Radio | Religious |
| KBRJ | 104.1 FM | Anchorage | Alpha Media Licensee LLC | Country |
| KBRW | 680 AM | Utqiaġvik | Silakkuagvik Communications, Inc. | Public Radio |
| KBRW-FM | 91.9 FM | Utqiaġvik | Silakkuagvik Communications, Inc. | Public Radio |
| KBUQ | 91.9 FM | Buckland | Kotzebue Broadcasting, Inc. | Variety |
| KBYR | 700 AM | Anchorage | OMG FCC Licenses LLC | News/Talk Information |
| KCAM | 790 AM | Glennallen | Joy Media Ministries | Religious |
| KCAM-FM | 88.7 FM | Glennallen | Joy Media Ministries | Contemporary Christian |
| KCAW | 104.7 FM | Sitka | Raven Radio Foundation, Inc. | Public Radio |
| KCBF | 820 AM | Fairbanks | Tor Ingstad Licenses, LLC | Sports (ESPN) |
| KCDV | 100.9 FM | Cordova | Bayview Communications, Inc. | Adult Contemporary |
| KCEF | 93.3 FM | Chefornak | Bethel Broadcasting, Inc. | Public Radio |
| KCHU | 770 AM | Valdez | Terminal Radio, Inc. | Public Radio |
| KCUK | 88.1 FM | Chevak | Kashunamiut School District | Public Radio |
| KDFJ-LP | 105.9 FM | Fairbanks | Bible Baptist Church of Fairbanks | Religious Teaching |
| KDHS-LP | 95.5 FM | Delta Junction | Delta/Greely School District | Variety |
| KDJF | 93.5 FM | Ester | Tor Ingstad Licenses, LLC | Country |
| KDLG | 670 AM | Dillingham | Dillingham City School District | Variety |
| KDLG-FM | 89.9 FM | Dillingham | Dillingham City School District | Variety |
| KDLL | 91.9 FM | Kenai | Pickle Hill Public Broadcasting, Inc. | Public Radio |
| KDRG | 91.9 FM | Deering | Kotzebue Broadcasting, Inc. | Variety |
| KEAG | 97.3 FM | Anchorage | Alpha Media Licensee LLC | Classic hits |
| KEDI | 98.3 FM | Bethel | Strait Media LLC | Full Service |
| KENI | 650 AM | Anchorage | iHM Licenses, LLC | News/Talk |
| KEUL | 88.9 FM | Girdwood | Girdwood Community Club Inc | Variety |
| KFAR | 660 AM | Fairbanks | Rob Ingstad Licenses, LLC | News/Talk |
| KFAT | 92.9 FM | Anchorage | OMG FCC Licenses LLC | Rhythmic Top-40 |
| KFBX | 970 AM | Fairbanks | iHM Licenses, LLC | Talk |
| KFMJ | 99.9 FM | Ketchikan | KFMJ Radio LLC | Classic hits |
| KFNP-LP | 99.5 FM | North Pole | North Star Broadcasting, Inc. | Christian (Radio 74 Internationale) |
| KFPS | 88.1 FM | False Pass | Aleutian Peninsula Broadcasting, Inc. | Public Radio |
| KFQD | 750 AM | Anchorage | Alpha Media Licensee LLC | News/Talk |
| KFSE | 106.9 FM | Kasilof | KSRM Radio Group, Inc. | Mainstream rock |
| KFSK | 100.9 FM | Petersburg | Narrows Broadcasting Corp. | Public Radio |
| KGOT | 101.3 FM | Anchorage | iHM Licenses, LLC | Top 40 (CHR) |
| KGTL | 620 AM | Homer | Peninsula Communications, Inc. | News/Talk |
| KGTW | 106.7 FM | Ketchikan | Alaska Broadcast Communications, Inc. | Country |
| KGYA | 90.5 FM | Grayling | Kuskokwim Public Broadcasting Corporation | Variety |
| KHAR | 590 AM | Anchorage | Alpha Media Licensee LLC | Adult standards |
| KHCX | 90.9 FM | Homer | Safe Harbor Broadcasting, Inc. | Christian Contemporary |
| KHGQ | 101.7 FM | Shungnak | Nome Seventh-Day Adventist Church | Religious |
| KHKY | 92.7 FM | Akiachak | Yupiit School District | Variety |
| KHNS | 102.3 FM | Haines | Lynn Canal Broadcasting | Public Radio/Variety |
| KHOO | 90.7 FM | Hoonah | Hoonah City School District | Variety |
| KHRA-LP | 94.1 FM | Anchorage | Holy Rosary Academy | Catholic |
| KHSK | 93.3 FM | Emmonak | Bethel Broadcasting, Inc. | Nostalgia |
| KHUS | 98.1 FM | Huslia | Big River Public Broadcasting Corporation | Public Radio |
| KHUU | 97.1 FM | Hughes | Big River Public Broadcasting Corporation | Public Radio |
| KHYG-FM | 91.1 FM | Hydaburg | Hydaburg City School District | Variety |
| KIAK-FM | 102.5 FM | Fairbanks | iHM Licenses, LLC | Country |
| KIAM | 630 AM | Nenana | Voice for Christ Ministries, Inc. | Religious |
| KIAM-FM | 91.9 FM | Nenana | Voice for Christ Ministries, Inc | Religious |
| KIAN | 91.9 FM | Kiana | Kotzebue Broadcasting, Inc. | Variety |
| KIAO | 90.3 FM | Delta Junction | Delta Junction Seventh-Day Adventist Church | Religious (3ABN) |
| KIBH-FM | 91.7 FM | Seward | Kenai Mountains Public Media, Inc. | Variety |
| KICY | 850 AM | Nome | Arctic Broadcasting Association | Religious |
| KICY-FM | 100.3 FM | Nome | Arctic Broadcasting Association | Contemporary Christian |
| KIEA | 91.9 FM | Selawik | Kotzebue Broadcasting, Inc. | Variety |
| KIFW | 1230 AM | Sitka | Alaska Broadcast Communications, Inc | Full service |
| KIGG | 103.3 FM | Igiugig | Dillingham City School District | Variety |
| KIGI | 106.9 FM | Igiugig | Bay Broadcasting Company | Religious |
| KIJV (Alaska) | 790 AM | Juneau | Audacy, Inc. | Dance |
| KINU | 89.9 FM | Kotzebue | Kotzebue Broadcasting Inc. | Variety |
| KINY | 800 AM | Juneau | BTC USA Holdings Management Inc. | Full service |
| KIYU-FM | 88.1 FM | Galena | Big River Public Broadcasting Corporation | Public Radio |
| KJBA | 96.7 FM | Craig | New Hope Baptist Church of Craig | Unknown Format |
| KJHA | 88.7 FM | Houston | Evangelistic Alaska Missionary Fellowship, Inc. | Christian |
| KJLP | 88.9 FM | Palmer | Christian Broadcasting, Inc. | Religious |
| KJNO | 630 AM | Juneau | Alaska Broadcast Communications, Inc | News/Talk, Sports (CBS/ESPN) |
| KJNP | 1170 AM | North Pole | Evangelistic Alaska Missionary Fellowship, Inc. | Christian |
| KJNP-FM | 100.3 FM | North Pole | Evangelistic Alaska Missionary Fellowship, Inc. | Christian |
| KJNR | 91.9 FM | Bethel | New Life Tabernacle Homer AK | Contemporary Christian |
| KKED | 104.7 FM | Fairbanks | iHM Licenses, LLC | Rock |
| KKET | 95.9 FM | Allakaket | Big River Public Broadcasting Corporation | Public Radio |
| KKIS-FM | 96.5 FM | Soldotna | KSRM Radio Group, Inc. | Contemporary Hit Radio |
| KKLK | 89.3 FM | Savoonga | Nome Seventh-Day Adventist Church | Religious |
| KKNI-FM | 105.3 FM | Sterling | KSRM Radio Group, Inc. | Classic Hits |
| KKQA | 88.1 FM | Akutan | Aleutian Peninsula Broadcasting, Inc. | Public Radio |
| KKWG | 93.3 FM | Kongiganak | Bethel Broadcasting, Inc. | Unknown Format |
| KLAM | 1450 AM | Cordova | Bayview Communications, Inc. | Country/Classic rock/Talk |
| KLEF | 98.1 FM | Anchorage | Chinook Concert Broadcasters | Classical |
| KLOP | 91.5 FM | Holy Cross | Kuskokwim Public Broadcasting Corporation | Variety |
| KLSF | 89.7 FM | Juneau | Educational Media Foundation | Contemporary Christian (K-Love) |
| KMBQ-FM | 99.7 FM | Wasilla | OMG FCC Licenses LLC | Modern AC |
| KMGS | 89.5 FM | Anvik | Kuskokwim Public Broadcasting Corporation | Variety |
| KMVN | 105.7 FM | Anchorage | Last Frontier Mediactive, LLC | Rhythmic Hot AC |
| KMXS | 103.1 FM | Anchorage | Alpha Media Licensee LLC | Hot AC |
| KMXT | 100.1 FM | Kodiak | Kodiak Public Broadcasting Corp. | Public Radio |
| KNAK-LP | 97.1 FM | Naknek | King's Chapel Bristol Bay Radio | Religious Teaching |
| KNBA | 90.3 FM | Anchorage | Koahnic Broadcast Corporation | Adult Album alternative |
| KNEE | 95.1 FM | Nenana | 40 Below Broadcasting | Oldies |
| KNGW | 88.9 FM | Juneau | CSN International | Religious (CSN International) |
| KNIB | 89.5 FM | Nikolai | Kuskokwim Public Broadcasting Corporation | Variety |
| KNKO | 88.5 FM | Shageluk | Kuskokwim Public Broadcasting Corporation | Variety |
| KNLT | 95.5 FM | Palmer | Joshua G. Fryfogle | Adult Album Alternative |
| KNNA-FM | 99.1 FM | Nenana | Athabascan Fiddlers Association, Inc. | Public Radio |
| KNOM | 780 AM | Nome | KNOM Radio Mission, Inc. | Full service |
| KNOM-FM | 96.1 FM | Nome | KNOM Radio Mission, Inc. | Full service |
| KNSA | 930 AM | Unalakleet | Unalakleet Broadcasting, Inc. | Variety |
| KNUL | 99.1 FM | Nulato | Big River Public Broadcasting Corporation | Public Radio |
| KNUN | 91.9 FM | Toksook Bay | Kashunamiut School District | Native American |
| KOAN | 1080 AM | Anchorage | Iglesia Pentecostal Vispera del Fin | Spanish |
| KODK | 90.7 FM | Kodiak | Kodiak Public Broadcasting Corporation | Public Radio |
| KOFW | 91.9 FM | Deltana | Our Father's World Radio | Unknown Format |
| KOGJ | 88.1 FM | Kenai | CSN International | Religious (CSN International) |
| KOLD-FM | 91.9 FM | Cold Bay | Aleutian Peninsula Broadcasting, Inc. | Public Radio |
| KONR-LP | 106.1 FM | Anchorage | Organization for Northern Development d/b/a Out North | Variety |
| KORI | 91.9 FM | Noorvik | Kotzebue Broadcasting, Inc. | Variety |
| KOTZ | 720 AM | Kotzebue | Kotzebue Broadcasting, Inc. | Variety |
| KOYU | 98.1 FM | Koyukuk | Big River Public Broadcasting Corporation | Public Radio |
| KPEN | 840 AM | Kenai | Peninsula Communications Inc | Nostalgia |
| KPEN-FM | 101.7 FM | Soldotna | Peninsula Communications, Inc. | Country |
| KPWI | 94.9 FM | Craig | Adventist Radio Alaska Corporation | Religious |
| KQHE | 92.7 FM | Fairbanks | Little Flower Ministries | Catholic |
| KQQJ | 90.7 FM | Juneau | Juneau Seventh-Day Adventist Church | Christian |
| KQQN | 89.3 FM | Nome | Nome Seventh-Day Adventist Church | Christian |
| KQQS | 89.3 FM | Sitka | Sitka Seventh-Day Adventist Church | Christian |
| KQVK | 91.9 FM | Kivalina | Kotzebue Broadcasting, Inc. | Variety |
| KRAK | 102.1 FM | Anchorage | OMG FCC Licenses LLC | Mainstream rock |
| KRBD | 105.3 FM | Ketchikan | Rainbird Community Broadcasting Corp. | Public Radio |
| KRBY | 98.1 FM | Ruby | Big River Public Broadcasting Corporation | Public Radio |
| KRFF | 89.1 FM | Fairbanks | Athabascan Fiddlers Association, Inc. | Native American/Americana |
| KRGW | 106.9 FM | Fairbanks | Adventist Radio Alaska Corporation | Christian |
| KRLL-FM | 93.9 FM | Circle | Athabascan Fiddlers Association, Inc. | Native American |
| KRMR | 93.3 FM | Russian Mission | Bethel Broadcasting, Inc. | News/Talk |
| KRNN | 102.7 FM | Juneau | Capital Community Broadcasting, Inc. | Variety |
| KRUA | 88.1 FM | Anchorage | University of Alaska – Board Of Regents | College |
| KRUP | 99.1 FM | Dillingham | Strait Media LLC | Talk |
| KSBZ | 103.1 FM | Sitka | Alaska Broadcast Communications, Inc. | Hot AC |
| KSCM | 94.3 FM | Scammon Bay | Visionalaska, Inc., Alaska Brethren Ministries | Religious |
| KSDP | 830 AM | Sand Point | Aleutian Peninsula Broadcasting, Inc | Public Radio/Full service |
| KSKA | 91.1 FM | Anchorage | Alaska Public Telecom., Inc. | Public Radio |
| KSKC | 89.5 FM | Crooked Creek | Kuskokwim Public Broadcasting Corporation | Variety |
| KSKO-FM | 89.5 FM | McGrath | Kuskokwim Public Broadcasting Corporation | Variety |
| KSKP | 89.5 FM | Sleetmute | Kuskokwim Public Broadcasting Corporation | Variety |
| KSLD | 1140 AM | Soldotna | KSRM Radio Group, Inc. | Sports (ESPN) |
| KSLK | 101.7 FM | Selawik | Nome Seventh-Day Adventist Church | Christian |
| KSRM | 920 AM | Soldotna | KSRM Radio Group, Inc. | News/Talk |
| KSTK | 101.7 FM | Wrangell | CoastAlaska, Inc. | Public Radio |
| KSUA | 91.5 FM | Fairbanks | University of Alaska, on Behalf of U Of AK, Fairbanks | Alternative rock |
| KSUP | 106.3 FM | Juneau | BTC USA Holdings Management Inc. | Hot AC |
| KSVQ | 89.3 FM | Gambell | Nome Seventh-Day Adventist Church | Christian |
| KSYU | 98.1 FM | Saint Marys | Big River Public Broadcasting Corporation | Public Radio |
| KTDZ | 103.9 FM | College | Rob Ingstad Licenses, LLC | Adult Hits |
| KTKF | 89.5 FM | Tok | Athabascan Fiddlers Association, Inc. | Ethnic |
| KTKN | 930 AM | Ketchikan | Alaska Broadcast Communications, Inc | Talk/Hot Adult Contemporary |
| KTKU | 105.1 FM | Juneau | Alaska Broadcast Communications, Inc. | Country |
| KTMV | 91.9 FM | Mountain Village, Alaska | Kashunamiut School District | |
| KTNA | 88.9 FM | Talkeetna | Talkeetna Community Radio, Inc. | Public Radio |
| KTOG | 91.9 FM | Togiak | Dillingham City School District | Variety |
| KTOO | 104.3 FM | Juneau | Capital Community Broadcasting, Inc. | Public Radio |
| KTUY | 101.7 FM | Togiak | Adventist Radio Alaska Corp. | Unknown Format |
| KTYU | 99.1 FM | Tanana | Big River Public Broadcasting Corporation | Public Radio |
| KTZN | 550 AM | Anchorage | iHM Licenses, LLC | Sports (FSR) |
| KUAC | 89.9 FM | Fairbanks | University of Alaska | Public Radio/Classical |
| KUBY-LP | 101.7 FM | Dillingham | Lightpole Radio DLG | Religious Teaching |
| KUCB | 89.7 FM | Unalaska | Unalaska Community Broadcasting, Inc. | Variety |
| KUDU | 91.9 FM | Tok | Lifetalk Radio, Inc. | Religious (LifeTalk Radio) |
| KUHB-FM | 91.9 FM | St. Paul | Pribilof School District Board of Education | Public Radio |
| KUIM | 96.1 FM | Bethel | Adventist Radio Alaska Corporation | Christian |
| KUIT | 93.3 FM | Goodnews Bay | Bethel Broadcasting, Inc. | Unknown Format |
| KUUK | 91.9 FM | Noatak | Kotzebue Broadcasting, Inc. | Variety |
| KUZY | 93.3 FM | Nunam Iqua | Bethel Broadcasting, Inc. | Unknown Format |
| KVAK | 1230 AM | Valdez | North Wave Communications, Inc. | Country/Talk |
| KVAK-FM | 93.3 FM | Valdez | North Wave Communications, Inc. | Adult contemporary/Classic rock |
| KVGR | 94.3 FM | Kiana | VisionAlaska, Inc., Alaska Brethren Ministries | Unknown Format |
| KVHZ | 1430 AM | Wasilla | WorthRome, LLC | Dance |
| KVNT | 1020 AM | Eagle River | Christian Broadcasting, Inc. | News/Talk |
| KVOK-FM | 101.1 FM | Kodiak | Kodiak Island Broadcasting Company, Inc. | Contemporary Hit Radio |
| KVRF | 89.5 FM | Sutton | Radio Free Palmer, Inc. | Variety |
| KVRK | 88.3 FM | Chickaloon | Radio Free Palmer, Inc. | Variety |
| KWDD | 94.3 FM | Fairbanks | Tor Ingstad Licenses, LLC | Country |
| KWHL | 106.5 FM | Anchorage | Alpha Media Licensee LLC | Active rock |
| KWHQ-FM | 100.1 FM | Kenai | KSRM Radio Group, Inc. | Country |
| KWLF | 98.1 FM | Fairbanks | Tor Ingstad Licenses, LLC | Top 40 (CHR) |
| KWNQ | 93.3 FM | Quinhagak | Bethel Broadcasting, Inc. | Unknown Format |
| KWRG-LP | 99.9 FM | Wrangell | Wrangell Adventist Broadcasting Corp. | Christian (LifeTalk Radio) |
| KWRK-LP | 90.9 FM | Fairbanks | Alaska Peace Center | Variety |
| KWTB | 92.3 FM | Alakanuk | Bethel Broadcasting, Inc. | Unknown Format |
| KWVV-FM | 103.5 FM | Homer | Peninsula Communications, Inc. | Alternative rock |
| KXBA | 93.3 FM | Nikiski | Peninsula Communications Inc. | Classic hits |
| KXES-LP | 92.9 FM | Galena | Yukon Wireless, Inc. | Variety |
| KXGA | 90.5 FM | Glennallen | Terminal Radio, Inc. | Public Radio |
| KXKM | 89.7 FM | Mccarthy | Terminal Radio Inc. | Public Radio |
| KXLL | 100.7 FM | Juneau | Capital Community Broadcasting, Inc. | Adult Album Alternative/Modern Rock hybrid |
| KXLR | 95.9 FM | Fairbanks | Rob Ingstad Licenses, LLC | Active rock |
| KXLW | 96.3 FM | Houston | OMG FCC Licenses LLC | Country |
| KXXJ | 1330 AM | Juneau | BTC USA Holdings Management Inc. | Classic hits |
| KYKA | 104.9 FM | Meadow Lakes | Educational Media Foundation | Christian Contemporary Worship Music (Air1) |
| KYKD | 100.1 FM | Bethel | Voice for Christ Ministries, Inc. | Religious |
| KYKT | 91.9 FM | Yakutat | Yakutat Tlingit Tribe | Unknown Format |
| KYMG | 98.9 FM | Anchorage | iHM Licenses, LLC | Adult contemporary |
| KYMR-FM | 88.9 FM | Metlakatla | Annette Islands School District | Unknown Format |
| KYSC | 96.9 FM | Fairbanks | Rob Ingstad Licenses, LLC | Classic rock |
| KYUK | 640 AM | Bethel | Bethel Broadcasting, Inc. | Public radio |
| KYUK-FM | 90.3 FM | Bethel | Bethel Broadcasting, Inc. | Freeform |
| KYUP | 91.9 FM | Scammon Bay | Kashunamiut School District | Public Radio |
| KZLR | 88.3 FM | Fairbanks | Educational Media Foundation | Contemporary Christian (K-Love) |
| KZNC | 91.9 FM | Red Dog Mine Port | Kotzebue Broadcasting, Inc. | Variety |
| KZND-FM | 94.7 FM | Houston | Last Frontier Mediactive, LLC | Alternative rock |
| KZNR | 91.1 FM | Red Dog Mine | Kotzebue Broadcasting, Inc. | Variety |
| KZPA | 900 AM | Fort Yukon | Gwandak Public Broadcasting, Inc. | Full Service |

== Defunct stations ==
- KABN-FM - Kasilof
- KAKQ - Fairbanks
- KALA - Sitka
- KAMP-LP - St. Michael
- KANC - Anchorage
- KAQU-LP - Sitka
- KAUG - Anchorage
- KCDS - Deadhorse
- KCKC - Long Island
- KEGR-LP - Wasilla
- KEAA-LP - Eagle
- KGBU - Ketchikan
- KGVC - Glacier View
- KHGO - Homer
- KHOH - Seldovia
- KHZK - Kotzebue
- KIAL - Unalaska
- KIBH - Seward
- KJFP - Yakutat
- KLIU-LP - Unalakleet
- KMJG - Homer
- KOGB - McGrath
- KRAW - Sterling
- KRSA - Petersburg
- KSEW - Seward
- KSEW - Sitka
- KSVJ - Seward
- KUWL - Fairbanks
- KVBV-LP - Anchorage
- KVIM-LP - Juneau
- KVOK - Kodiak
- KWJG - Kasilof
- KWMD - Kasilof
- KZXX - Kenai
