= KJNP-TV =

Television station in North Pole, Alaska

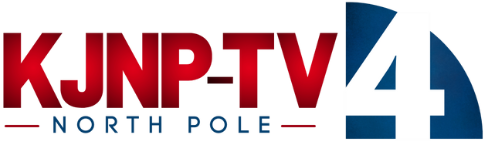
- North Pole–Fairbanks, Alaska; United States
- City: North Pole, Alaska
- Channels: Digital: 20 (UHF); Virtual: 4
- Branding: KJNP-TV

Programming
- Affiliations: Religious Independent

Ownership
- Owner: Christian Broadcasting, Inc.

History
- First air date: December 7, 1981
- Former channel number: Analog: 4 (VHF, 1981–2009)
- Former affiliations: Independent (1981–1990); TBN (1990–2022)
- Call sign meaning: "King Jesus North Pole"; derived from former sister stations KJNP-AM-FM

Technical information
- Licensing authority: FCC
- Facility ID: 20015
- ERP: 30.9 kW; 3.36 kW (STA)
- HAAT: 491.6 m (1,613 ft)
- Transmitter coordinates: 64°52′43.4″N 148°3′22.7″W

Links
- Public license information: Public file; LMS
- Website: cbimediagroup.com/kjnp-channel-4-north-pole

KJNP-TV (channel 4) is a religious independent television station licensed to North Pole, Alaska, United States, serving the Fairbanks area. The station is owned by Christian Broadcasting, Inc. KJNP-TV's transmitter is located on the Ester Dome.

== History ==
Signing on on December 7, 1981, and becoming an affiliate of the Trinity Broadcasting Network (TBN) in 1990 (and its only full-power affiliate in Alaska), KJNP-TV became the fourth television station in the Fairbanks area after KUAC. Originally broadcasting 16 hours a day, the schedule expanded to 24 hours a day in 2003, following the installation of a new transmitter.

KJNP-TV and KJNP-AM-FM (which launched in 1967) were founded by Don and Gen Nelson.

On April 26, 2022, Evangelistic Alaska Missionary Fellowship agreed to donate KJNP-TV to Anchorage-based Christian Broadcasting, Inc.; the transaction was completed on August 8, separating the TV station from KJNP radio.

In addition to religious and some secular programs, KJNP-TV also broadcasts Closing Comments, one of the longest-running public affairs programs on local television.

== Technical information ==
=== Subchannels ===
The station's signal is multiplexed:

Subchannels of KJNP-TV
Channel	Res.	Short name	Programming
4.1	480i	KJNP	Main KJNP-TV programming (4:3)
4.2	Audio only	KCBR	KCBR-FM 90.7
4.3	Audio only	KAFC	KAFC 93.7
4.4	Audio only	KATB	KATB 89.3
4.5	Audio only	KVNT	KVNT 1020

=== Analog-to-digital conversion ===
KJNP-TV shut down its analog signal, over VHF channel 4, on June 12, 2009, the official date on which full-power television stations in the United States transitioned from analog to digital broadcasts under federal mandate. The station's digital signal remained on its pre-transition UHF channel 20, using virtual channel 4.

== See also ==
- KJNP (AM)
- KJNP-FM
