= KIAM =

Kiam or KIAM may refer to:

== People ==
- Omar Kiam (1894–1954), American costume and fashion designer
- Song Hoot Kiam (1830–1900), Singaporean community leader
- Victor Kiam (1926–2001), American entrepreneur

== Other ==
- 11011 KIAM, asteroid
- KIAM (AM), a radio station (630 AM) licensed to Nenana, Alaska, United States
- KIAM-FM, a radio station (91.9 FM) licensed to North Nenana, Alaska, United States
- Kiam Building, a building in Houston, Texas, United States
