= KJNP =

KJNP is a broadcasting call sign, standing for King Jesus North Pole. KJNP may refer to the following broadcasting stations established by missionaries Don and Gen Nelson:

- KJNP (AM), a radio station (1170 AM) licensed to North Pole, Alaska, United States
- KJNP-FM, a radio station (100.3 FM) licensed to North Pole, Alaska, United States
- KJNP-TV, a television station (channel 4 analog/20 digital) licensed to North Pole, Alaska, United States
