= KSWD =

KSWD may refer to:

- KSWD (FM), a radio station (94.1 FM) licensed to Seattle, Washington, United States
- KKLQ (FM), a radio station (100.3 FM) licensed to Los Angeles, California, United States, which used the call sign KSWD from May 2008 to November 2017
- KSEW, a radio station (950 AM) licensed to Seward, Alaska, United States, which used the call sign KSWD from September 1991 to May 2008
- KKNI-FM, a radio station (105.9 FM) licensed to Seward, Alaska, United States, which used the call sign KSWD-FM from January 2006 to May 2008
- KSWD, the Indian Railways station code for Kasarwadi railway station, Pune, Maharashtra, India
