= KMBQ =

KMBQ may refer to:

- KMBQ-FM, a radio station (99.7 FM) licensed to serve Wasilla, Alaska, United States
- KVHZ, a radio station (1430 AM) licensed to serve Wasilla, which held the call sign KMBQ from 2008 to 2011
