= KPEN =

KPEN may refer to:

- KPEN (AM), a radio station (840 AM) licensed to serve Kenai, Alaska, United States
- KPEN-FM, a radio station (101.7 FM) licensed to serve Soldotna, Alaska
