= Tabe Slioor =

Finnish photographer (1926–2006)

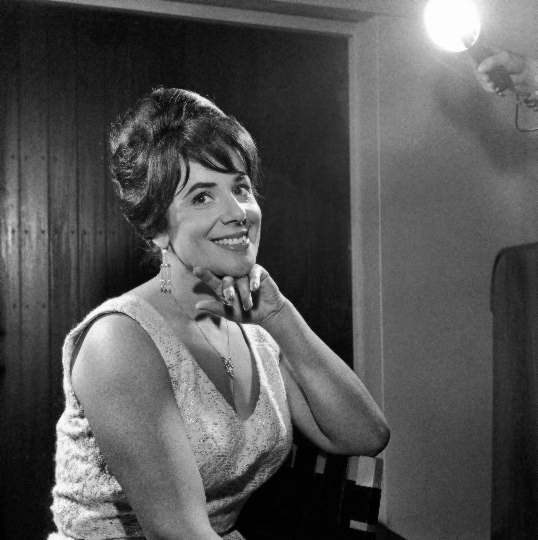
Ms. Slioor in 1961.

Tabe Maria Ingeborg Slioor (21 November 1926, Helsinki – 25 April 2006, Turku) was a Finnish socialite, reporter, and photojournalist, living and working in Europe and the United States.

== Biography ==
=== Background ===
Slioor was born to a Persian father, a fruit shopkeeper, and a Finnish mother, a homemaker, in Helsinki, Finland in 1926, and had three older brothers. After her parents divorced, Slioor was raised in an orphanage for girls, seeing her parents sometimes. Her father died in 1936, and her mother lived in a hospital for mental issues. In 1947, The Salvation Army's Family Tracing Service found out that Slioor's paternal grandfather was still living in Iran and carried the title of Prince.

=== Life and career in Finland ===
Slioor married her first husband Sigurd Laesvirta, a Finnish painter, in 1944, and they had a daughter named Aulikki. Through the marriage, Slioor was involved in Finnish art circles and soon started to work as a model. After divorcing her first husband in 1948, Slioor became a single parent and continued working as a model and also appeared in the Finnish film Tanssi yli hautojen (Dancing on Graves), which was directed by Toivo Särkkä and written by Mika Waltari. The film was released in 1950.

Slioor was trained in a local modeling school in Finland, and then founded the Helsinki School for Models in 1951. The following year, she continued her training at the Ecole Parisienne de Mannequins modeling school in Paris, and became the first Finn to earn a top diploma in modeling. To get more currency for her trip to Paris, Slioor needed a special permission from the Bank of Finland, where she met and befriended Urho Kekkonen, who later became arguably the most powerful and significant President of Finland. The nature of their relationship has been a subject of speculation for decades.

Slioor's beauty, poise, charisma, and events of life allowed her to rise to importance in the eyes of the fledgling Finnish media, and she has been called one of the first Finnish celebrities along the 1952 Miss Universe Armi Kuusela. In addition to modeling and running her own modeling school, Slioor also took part in race rallying and won three times the women's series of The Race of 1000 Kilometers organized by The Automobile and Touring Club of Finland. Slioor was also the first woman to be allowed to go to restaurants in Finland without a male company.

In 1953, Slioor met both Prince Bertil of Sweden and Erik von Frenckell, a nobleman and married Mayor of Helsinki, at a society event in Finland. While she reportedly befriended with Prince Bertil and kept in touch with him over the years, Slioor and Von Frenckell became lovers, and several newspaper articles were written about them at the time. Slioor and von Frenckell openly attended various events in Finland, and they also travelled together around Europe, including Austria, Switzerland, and France. At Brussels World's Fair, they attended a ball held to honour Princess Margaret of England, and Slioor played piano four hands with her. They also explored the fair in the same group with the Princess.

Slioor started to organize fashion shows for members of the Finnish upper class in the early 1950s. She held fashion shows not only in Finland, though, but also in Russia, New York, and even on the Queen Elizabeth. In 1955, Slioor lived in New York for a while, staying first at the Plaza Hotel and then in Sonja Henie's residence. She studied privately in a local modeling school, and held a successful fashion show for Vijaya Lakshmi Pandit and the wives of some of the UN diplomats. Among other newspapers and radio and TV interviews, The New York Times wrote an article about Slioor, "a buxom, flashing-eyed beauty", who is "Finland's leading model and the director of the Helsinki School for Models". In 1957, Slioor organized a major modeling and textile fair with great success in Saint Petersburg with the Soviet Union Chamber of Commerce. Mayor Nikolay Smirnov served as the patron of the fair, which attracted thousands of visitors every day. By the time, Slioor had also held her own fashion show on Finnish television, which origin is in the mid-1950s.

From 1955 to 1965, Slioor lived in a grand apartment in Ullanlinna, a wealthy district of Helsinki, and hosted various social events for artists, including actors, writers and poets, as well as diplomats, professors, royals, and other celebrities. She was good friends with Pentti Saarikoski, George de Godzinsky and others. From 1960 to 1962, Slioor was married to Kalevi Nietosvaara, a Finnish jurist and longtime friend. In 1962, she starred in Se alkoi omenasta (It Started with an Apple), a Teuvo Tulio short film about Slioor herself.

During the early 1960s, Slioor published a serialized account of her life and relationships with men in the Finnish men's magazine Jallu (Finland's equivalent to Playboy). The memoirs, completed with numerous photographs, letters, and other documents, were featured in 10 issues under the title of Miehet ja minä (Men And I), and Slioor was on the cover of each of those issues. As Slioor was very open about her relationship with von Frenckell, a nobleman and married mayor of Helsinki, there was an enormous interest in the subject, and Jallu broke records as around 280,000 copies of one issue were sold (Finland's population was 4.5 million at the time).

Slioor soon founded her own magazine, Madame (1962 – 1965), which became the first gossip magazine in Finland. Her daughter Aulikki worked for the magazine as well, travelling around Europe and North Africa. Within the magazine, Slioor also launched her own collection of Tabe perfumes, made in France, and had Timo Sarpaneva design the bottles and packages.

=== Years in the United States ===
Slioor moved to the United States in the mid-1960s and married Matti Kosonen, a Finnish American pilot and Vietnam veteran. The marriage lasted from 1965 to 1968.

During the years in the States, Slioor worked as a reporter and photographer, living in San Francisco. She met, interviewed, and photographed various public figures, including Ronald Reagan, Robert F. Kennedy, Henry Miller, Bing Crosby, Harry Belafonte, and Rita Hayworth, and sent numerous reportages from the States to be published in Jallu magazine in Finland, appearing on the Jallu covers with the likes of Tom McCall, Nelson Rockefeller, and Spiro Agnew. Slioor also reported from San Quentin Prison, being the first reporter allowed to photograph the prison freely, and made work trips to other parts of the States, including Chicago.

In San Francisco, Slioor befriended with Benny Bufano, who taught her to do mosaics. Later on, Bufano stated he had sold two of Slioor's works for $1,000 per each. Slioor and Bufano started to work and attend social events together, including the wedding of Angela Alioto, the daughter of Joseph Alioto, then-mayor of San Francisco. Slioor also befriended with other high-profile people, including Melvin Belli, Clinton Duffy, Walt Baptiste, and Ching Wah Lee.

In 1969, The Bufano Society of the Arts started to claim back sculptures given or sold by Bufano to Slioor. She had pieces of art by Bufano worth around $250,000. Slioor refused, and the media started to report on the case, including especially both the San Francisco Chronicle and The San Francisco Examiner as well as TV and radio stations like KTVU. The case was also followed by the Finnish press. Eventually, Slioor had to return most of the works as The Bufano Society was the legal owner of all of Bufano's art. Bufano had no right to give away any of his works to anyone as he did not own those personally, like stated in the San Francisco Chronicle on February 11, 1969. In the court, Slioor was represented by the law firm of Melvin Belli, who had also handled her third divorce. Furthermore, Slioor had been working on Bufano's autobiography for months, but it was never finished as Bufano died in 1970.

While living in San Francisco, Slioor got married for the last time. Her fourth husband was photographer William Douglas Ganslen. The couple, however, divorced in 1976.

As for Slioor's daughter Aulikki, she started to work in the music business, working in sound engineering for Herbie Hancock, Lydia Pense and Cold Blood, Santana, The Pointer Sisters, and others, as well as jamming with Jorma Kaukonen of Jefferson Airplane and Jerry Garcia of the Grateful Dead at Kaukonen's. Aulikki also worked as a cowgirl in Tennessee Ernie Ford's ranch in Nevada. Later on, she moved to Alaska, became a private pilot, got married, had a daughter, and worked as an artist and a writer. She also had her own art studio and gallery, and hosted her own radio shows on KBBI and KDLL. Nowadays, Aulikki Slioor Knight works for her husband's business, Commercial & Recreational Marine Services LLC.. In September 2010, she and her husband ended a long, successful journey as they sailed 2455 miles in three months, bringing their new boat, a 1959 wooden yacht, from Sausalito, California, to Homer, Alaska.

=== Later life in Finland ===
After 16 years in the United States, Slioor moved back to Finland and disappeared from the public spotlight. In 1997, WSOY published her autobiography Tabe, and she gave interviews for Finnish TV, radio, and print media about her life. After the launch of the book, she disappeared again.

Slioor spent most of her later life in Turku, where she lived in a small apartment with her cat. During the years, she kept in touch with her family and friends, including daughter Aulikki and granddaughter Sativa. In spring 2006, it was widely reported that Slioor had died.

In 2007, Slioor's life was portrayed in a play in a Helsinki theatre, and she was also named as one of Finland's 90 dignitaries since its independence in 1917 by authors of The National Biography of Finland. Slioor also made front-page headlines in 2009, when it was revealed that Urho Kekkonen, the longest-serving President of Finland, had used the Finnish Security Police to keep an eye on her. In 2010, Slioor became a media subject again as her life was portrayed in a new play at the Alexander Theatre in Helsinki. She also became one of the central figures in researcher Laura Saarenmaa's doctoral thesis Intiimit äänet (Voices of Intimacy).

In the summers of 2011 and 2012, the Finnish Broadcasting Company aired Se alkoi omenasta (It Started with an Apple), the 1962 short film on Slioor's life, starring Slioor as herself. Also in 2012, Slioor's famed 1964 Corvette Sting Ray Coupe was showcased at the annual American Car Show in Finland. The car has been prominently featured in the Finnish press over the years, including the original stories and pictures in Jallu magazine and more recent ones in the automobile magazine Mobilisti and the second largest newspaper in the country Ilta-Sanomat.

In 2014, Finnish women's magazine Eeva published a front-page article on Slioor and Erik von Frenckell's romance.
