= KICY =

KICY may refer to:

- KICY (AM), a radio station (850 AM) licensed to Nome, Alaska, United States
- KICY-FM, a radio station (100.3 FM) licensed to Nome, Alaska, United States
