= KKNI =

KKNI may refer to:

- KKNI-FM, a radio station (105.3 FM) licensed to serve Sterling, Alaska, United States
- KVHZ, a radio station (1430 AM) licensed to serve Wasilla, Alaska, which held the call sign KKNI from 2014 to 2017
