= KCEF =

KCEF may refer to:

- KCEF (FM), a radio station (93.3 FM) licensed to serve Chefornak, Alaska, United States
- Westover Air Reserve Base (ICAO code KCEF)
