= KDBZ =

KDBZ may refer to:

- KDBZ-CD, a low-power television station (channel 29, virtual 6) licensed to serve Bozeman, Montana, United States
- KRAK (FM), a radio station (102.1 FM) licensed to serve Anchorage, Alaska, United States, which held the call sign KDBZ from 2002 to 2014
