= KXLW =

Radio station in Houston–Anchorage, Alaska

Coordinates: 61.336°N 149.516°W

- Houston, Alaska; United States
- Broadcast area: Anchorage, Alaska
- Frequency: 96.3 MHz
- Branding: 96.3 The Moose

Programming
- Format: Country

Ownership
- Owner: Ohana Media Group; (OMG FCC Licenses LLC)
- Sister stations: KBBO-FM; KBYR; KFAT; KMBQ-FM; KRAK

History
- First air date: 2003

Technical information
- Licensing authority: FCC
- Facility ID: 78362
- Class: C2
- ERP: 10,000 watts
- HAAT: 270 meters (890 ft)

Links
- Public license information: Public file; LMS
- Website: themoose963.com

KXLW (96.3 The Moose) is a commercial country music radio station in Houston, Alaska, broadcasting to the Anchorage, Alaska area on 96.3 FM. It is owned by Ohana Media. Its studios are located in Downtown Anchorage and its transmitter is in Eagle River, Alaska.

The station adjusted its format from a hybrid of classic rock and country music to a mix of contemporary and classic country hits in October 2010.

On March 21, 2016, KXLW rebranded as "96.3 The Moose", and shifted its playlist to an 1980s/1990s country based format.
