= KSKP =

KSKP may refer to:

- KSKP (FM), a radio station (89.5 FM) licensed to serve Sleetmute, Alaska, United States; see List of radio stations in Alaska
- KSKP-CA, a defunct low-power television station (channel 25) formerly licensed to serve Oxnard, California, United States
