= KBBO =

KBBO may refer to:

- KBBO (AM), a radio station (980 AM) licensed to Selah, Washington, United States
- KBBO-FM, a radio station (92.1 FM) licensed to Houston, Alaska, United States
