= KAFC (disambiguation) =

KAFC is a commercial Christian contemporary music radio station in Anchorage, Alaska.

KAFC may also refer to:

- Kent Athletic F.C.
- Kidsgrove Athletic F.C.
