= KFAT =

KFAT may refer to:

- The ICAO code for Fresno Yosemite International Airport, located in Fresno, California, United States
- KFAT (FM), a radio station (92.9 FM) licensed to Anchorage, Alaska, United States
- KBAY, a radio station (94.5 FM) located in Gilroy, California, United States, that used the call sign KFAT from 1975 to 1983
- National Union of Knitwear, Footwear & Apparel Trades
