= KUCB =

KUCB may refer to:

- KUCB (FM), a radio station (89.7 FM) licensed to serve Unalaska, Alaska, United States
- KUCB-LD, a low-power television station (channel 8) licensed to serve Dutch Harbor, Alaska
- KUCB-FM (Iowa), a defunct radio station (89.3 FM) formerly licensed to serve Des Moines, Iowa, United States
