= KNUN =

KNUN may refer to:

- KNUN (FM), a radio station (91.9 FM) licensed to serve Toksook Bay, Alaska, United States
- Saufley Field (ICAO code KNUN)
