= KWAP =

KWAP may refer to:

- KWAP-LP, a low-power radio station (97.5 FM) licensed to serve Florissant, Missouri, United States; see List of radio stations in Missouri
- Kumpulan Wang Persaraan (Diperbadankan) or Retirement Fund (Incorporated), a pension fund in Malaysia
- KVHZ, a radio station (1430 AM) licensed to serve Wasilla, Alaska, United States, which held the call sign KWAP from 2011 to 2014
