= Walter Soboleff =

Native Alaskan scholar, elder and religious leader

- Ka'jaḵ'tii

Personal life
- Born: November 14, 1908 Killisnoo, Alaska, United States
- Died: May 22, 2011 (aged 102) Juneau, Alaska
- Spouse: Genevieve Ross
- Education: University of Dubuque

Religious life
- Religion: Presbyterian

Walter Alexander Soboleff (Tlingit: Ka'jaḵ'tii; Russian: Уолтер Александр Со́болев; November 14, 1908 – May 22, 2011) was a Tlingit scholar, elder and religious leader. Soboleff was the first Native Alaskan to become an ordained Presbyterian minister.

== Early life ==
Soboleff was born in Killisnoo, Alaska, on November 14, 1908, to a Tlingit mother and a Russian father. Soboleff was born into the Tlingit name Ka'jaḵ'tii, meaning One Slain in Battle. His mother, Anna Hunter, who had been orphaned in nearby Sitka, had canoed to Killisnoo with her brother to stay with their aunt. His father, Alexander "Sasha" Soboleff, resided in Killisnoo with his parents and three brothers. Walter Soboleff's paternal grandfather, was a Russian Orthodox minister named Ivan Soboleff, who moved to Killisnoo from San Francisco during the 1890s. His father, Alexander, died when Walter was twelve years old and his mother remarried.

He was raised in Tenakee. He first attended a U.S. Government School in Tenakee before enrolling at the Sheldon Jackson School boarding school in Sitka when he was five years old. He began working as a Tlingit language interpreter for doctors at ten years old during the height of the 1918 flu pandemic in Southeast Alaska.

Soboleff was hired for his first job at the Hood Bay fish cannery when he was a freshman at Sheldon Jackson High School in 1925. He earned 25 cents an hour at the cannery.

In 1925, Soboleff sailed from Sitka to Seattle aboard the Admiral Lines steamship. He then hitchhiked from Seattle to enroll at college at Oregon Agricultural College (Oregon State University). However, he was only able to stay at Oregon Agricultural College for one semester due to the financial pressures of the Great Depression. He hitchhiked back to Seattle, where he stayed at a YMCA in the city until he could return to his studies.

Soboleff won a scholarship to the University of Dubuque in 1933. He completed a bachelor's degree at the University of Dubuque in 1937 in education. Soboleff went on to earn a master's degree in divinity, also from the University of Dubuque, in 1940.

Soboleff returned to Sitka, Alaska, during the summer of 1940, where he initially worked in cold storage or seine fishing. He was ordained a Presbyterian minister and married his wife, Genevieve Ross, a Haida woman and nurse who was involved in the revival of the Haida language in Alaska. Walter and Genevieve had four children: Janet, Sasha, Walter Jr. and Ross.

== Ministry and activism ==
Soboleff moved to Juneau, Alaska, where he served as a minister at Memorial Presbyterian Church in 1940, a then-predominantly Tlingit church which grew to include members from other ethnic groups. The Church was unjustly closed in 1962, and in 2022, the PCUSA formally apologized for "the act of spiritual abuse." He also began broadcasting radio news in the Tlingit language for local station KSEW.

Soboleff traveled to remote Alaskan settlements, fishing villages, and even lighthouses as needed by the Presbyterian ministry. He also became a Tlingit and Native Alaskan advocate for cultural education, human rights and rights of indigenous people in Alaska.

== Death ==
Walter Soboleff died at his home in Juneau, Alaska, on May 22, 2011, at the age of 102, of complications from bone cancer and prostate cancer. His first wife, Genevieve, died in January 1986. He married his second wife, Tshimshian Stella Alice Atkinson, in 1999. Atkinson died in April 2008.

== Legacy and honors ==
Alaska Governor Sean Parnell ordered that all state flags be lowered to half staff in Soboleff's honor. Hundreds of people, including Governor Parnell, attended Soboleff's memorial service at Centennial Hall in Juneau. The service was broadcast live on television throughout the state of Alaska.

In May 2015, the Sealaska Heritage Institute opened the Walter Soboleff Building, a cultural and research center in downtown Juneau, Alaska.

In 2016, Congress created the Alyce Spotted Bear and Walter Soboleff Commission on Native Children in his memory.

In 2023, the General Assembly of the PCUSA apologized to Walter Soboleff, his family, clan, the former members of Memorial Presbyterian Church, the community as a whole, and made reparations. Bronwen Boswell, the clerk of the PCUSA, said: "The Presbyterian Church USA apologizes for the act of spiritual abuse committed by the Presbyterian Church's decision of closure, which was sadly aligned with nationwide racism toward Alaska Natives, Indigenous nations, Native Americans and other people of color."
