= KVHZ =

- Wasilla, Alaska; United States
- Broadcast area: Matanuska-Susitna Valley
- Frequency: 1430 kHz
- Branding: KHitz 107.1

Programming
- Language: English
- Format: Mainstream rock

Ownership
- Owner: Aaron Coman and Erin Marie Cruz; (WorthRome, LLC)

History
- First air date: December 12, 2008 (as KMBQ)
- Former call signs: KMBQ (2008–2011); KWAP (2011–2014); KKNI (2014–2017)

Technical information
- Licensing authority: FCC
- Facility ID: 161023
- Class: B
- Power: 1,000 watts
- Transmitter coordinates: 61°37′4.1″N 149°17′18″W
- Translator: 107.1 K296FP (Willow Creek)

Links
- Public license information: Public file; LMS
- Webcast: Listen Live
- Website: khitz1071.com

KVHZ (1430 AM) is an American radio station licensed to serve the community of Wasilla, Alaska. The station began broadcasting under program test authority as KMBQ in December 2008. Currently owned by Aaron Coman and Erin Marie Cruz, through licensee WorthRome, LLC, the station received its broadcast license on January 27, 2012.

KHITZ 107.1 (branded on-air as KHITZ 107–1) is a commercial rock-leaning music radio station serving the Mat-Su Valley and surrounding areas of Southcentral Alaska.

== History ==
=== Early days ===
In January 2004, Thomas L. Sweeney of Spokane, Washington, applied to the Federal Communications Commission (FCC) for a construction permit for a new broadcast radio station. The FCC granted this permit on December 15, 2005, with a scheduled expiration date of December 15, 2008. However, Sweeney died on January 31, 2006, at the age of 83. His daughter, Ruth Ann Sweeney, acting as her father's personal representative, notified the FCC of the involuntary transfer of control of the permit and the FCC approved the transfer on June 30, 2006.

While awaiting FCC action, Ruth Ann Sweeney reached an agreement in May 2006 to sell the construction permit to Charles Dunham, owner of Northern Radio, Inc., and the license holder for KSWD and KSWD-FM in Seward, Alaska. The FCC approved this sale on August 31, 2006, and the transaction was formally consummated on October 2, 2006.

=== Klapperich era ===
Dunham's tenure as owner was short-lived as in November 2006, he reached an agreement to sell the permit to John N. Klapperich. The FCC approved this sale on December 28, 2006, and formal consummation of the deal took place on January 29, 2007. Klapperich had the FCC assign the under-construction station call sign KMBQ on April 26, 2008.

Facing a December 15, 2008, deadline to begin broadcast operations or risk losing the construction permit, Klapperich faced a literal roadblock to completing construction as neighboring property owners blocked the access road to the property. Their objections included claims that the wetlands area in which the tower was located was a bird and salmon habitat and that "AM radio waves can cause brain damage". Klapperich and his crew were able to complete construction and begin broadcasting on December 10, just days ahead of the deadline, with a simulcast of then-sister station KMBQ-FM (99.7 FM). He immediately filed an application for the station's broadcast license which the FCC accepted on December 22, 2008, but it would require more than three years of filings and counter-filings before the commission would take further action.

In January 2009, Klapperich applied to the FCC to transfer the KMBQ construction permit from his personal control to Spirit of Alaska Broadcasting, Inc., a company wholly owned by Klapperich and his wife, Joan. The FCC approved the transfer on January 23, 2009, and formal consummation was filed on February 1, 2009.

=== Financial problems ===
In July 2010, Spirit of Alaska Broadcasting, Inc., licensee for KMBQ, KMBQ-FM, and KBYR, was placed into receivership by creditor Gladstone Capital Corp. The broadcaster owed the lender more than $2 million, according to published reports. The FCC granted an involuntary transfer of control of the broadcast licenses on August 19, 2010. Spirit of Alaska Broadcasting co-owner John Klapperich told the Anchorage Daily News that this was "an unbelievable situation" and that he and his wife "cleaned the potties on Sundays and we did everything we could for the station and the community." Although the station group reported a $10,000 profit for June 2010, the creditor took action when the broadcaster failed to promptly make payroll tax payments. Control of the stations was given to Virginia-based Bob Woodward, acting as receiver, with the goal of paying off "as much of its debt as possible".

In August 2011, sister stations KBYR (700 AM) and KMBQ-FM (99.7 FM) plus FM translators K203BY and K261AO were sold by Woodward, as receiver for Spirit of Alaska Broadcasting, Inc., to Ohana Media Group, LLC, for a reported $1.227 million. As KMBQ (1430 AM) was not part of this transaction, the licensee requested a new call sign for the station and it was assigned KWAP by the FCC on October 28, 2011.

=== Falling silent ===
In August 2010, the station's transmitter facility was damaged, taking the station dark from the 15th until the damage was repaired and normal operation resumed on August 20. The station fell silent again on December 29, 2010, but temporary measures returned them to the air a few days later.

However, in February 2011, KMBQ notified the FCC that "technical issues impeding normal operations" had again taken the station dark on January 23, 2011. The station's licensee reported that "dangerous ice and snow conditions immediately surrounding the transmitter site" prevented them from accessing the site to inspect or repair the equipment. The station's silence continued through the spring and summer, prompting the FCC to grant the station special temporary authority on October 12, 2011, to remain silent through no later than January 23, 2012. As a matter of law, if any U.S. broadcast station remains silent for a full year then its license is subject to automatic forfeiture and cancellation by the FCC. The station resumed regular broadcasting on November 22, 2011.

=== Broadcast license ===
After construction and testing were completed and with normal broadcast operations under program test authority continuing, the station applied for its broadcast license on January 10, 2012. The FCC granted the station its license on January 27, 2012.

The station changed its call sign to KKNI on January 22, 2014.

=== Launch of dance format ===
On April 4, 2016, KKNI operated its own automation and studio providing an in house classic rock format. The Wasilla station was a clone of KKNI-FM in Sterling AK but was not a simulcast. The station switched from the classic rock-format to dance, branded as "K Hitz 107 FM" (simulcast on FM translator K296FP 107.1 FM Willow Creek, Alaska). Effective May 2, 2016, Alaska Multimedia, LLC acquired KKNI and K296FP for $225,800. The station changed its call sign to the current KVHZ on January 18, 2017.

Effective September 30, 2021, Alaska Multimedia sold KVHZ and K296FP to Aaron Coman and Erin Marie Cruz's WorthRome, LLC for $180,000.
