= KIAM-FM =

- Nenana, Alaska; United States
- Frequency: 91.9 MHz

Programming
- Format: Religious

Ownership
- Owner: Voice For Christ Ministries, Inc.
- Sister stations: KIAM (AM), KAGV, KYKD

Technical information
- Licensing authority: FCC
- Facility ID: 174373
- Class: C3
- ERP: 950 watts
- HAAT: 257 meters (843 ft)
- Transmitter coordinates: 64°33′50″N 149°05′21″W

Links
- Public license information: Public file; LMS
- Webcast: Listen Live
- Website: KIAM-FM website

KIAM-FM (91.9 FM) is a radio station licensed to serve North Nenana, Alaska. The station is owned by Voice For Christ Ministries, Inc. It airs a Religious radio format as part of the I AM Radio Network.

The station was assigned the KIAM-FM call letters by the Federal Communications Commission on February 26, 2008.

== Translators ==
| Call sign | Frequency (MHz) | City of license | Facility ID | Class | ERP (W) | Height (m (ft)) |
|---|---|---|---|---|---|---|
| K232DM | 94.3 | Allakaket, Alaska | 138954 | D | 250 | 144 m (472 ft) |
| K232DV | 94.3 | Ambler, Alaska | 139014 | D | 250 | 108 m (354 ft) |
| K232DU | 94.3 | Anaktuvuk Pass, Alaska | 138968 | D | 250 | 647 m (2,123 ft) |
| K221AA | 92.1 | Bettles, Alaska | 70439 | D | 600 | 214 m (702 ft) |
| K231BJ | 94.1 | Eagle, Alaska | 139005 | D | 250 | 274 m (899 ft) |
| K232DX | 94.3 | Grayling, Alaska | 139008 | D | 250 | 58 m (190 ft) |
| K232DK | 94.3 | Hughes, Alaska | 139009 | D | 250 | 104 m (341 ft) |
| K232EV | 94.3 | Iliamna, Alaska | 139011 | D | 250 | 57 m (187 ft) |
| K232DL | 94.3 | McCarthy, Alaska | 139015 | D | 250 | 466 m (1,529 ft) |
| K232DZ | 94.3 | McGrath, Alaska | 139016 | D | 250 | 108 m (354 ft) |
| K232DJ | 94.3 | Perryville, Alaska | 139017 | D | 250 | 20 m (66 ft) |
| K232ES | 94.3 | Port Alsworth, Alaska | 139018 | D | 250 | 123 m (404 ft) |
| K232DI | 94.3 | Prudhoe Bay, Alaska | 139019 | D | 250 | 25 m (82 ft) |
| K241AB | 96.1 | Ruby, Alaska | 70441 | D | 250 | 60 m (200 ft) |
| K232DT | 94.3 | Sand Point, Alaska | 139021 | D | 250 | 31 m (102 ft) |
| K221DI | 92.1 | Tanana, Alaska | 70440 | D | 490 | 27 m (89 ft) |
