= Alaska Educational Radio System =

Alaskan non-profit radio network

Alaska Educational Radio System (AERS) is an Alaskan non-profit organization and is licensee of radio stations that are affiliated with Pacifica Radio, National Public Radio and other community radio and public broadcasting networks. AERS has studios in Anchorage and Soldotna.

AERS operates community radio stations KWMD (90.7 FM) and previously, KABN-FM (89.7) which broadcasts cover much of Southcentral Alaska including Anchorage, Eagle River, Kasilof, Kenai, Nikiski, Palmer, Soldotna, Sterling and Wasilla. AERS is further affiliated with KEUL (88.9 FM) located in Girdwood.

AERS has facilities pending in several additional communities including Fairbanks, Homer and Seward.
