= Miller's Reach Fire =

1996 wildfire in Alaska, United States

Miller's Reach fire
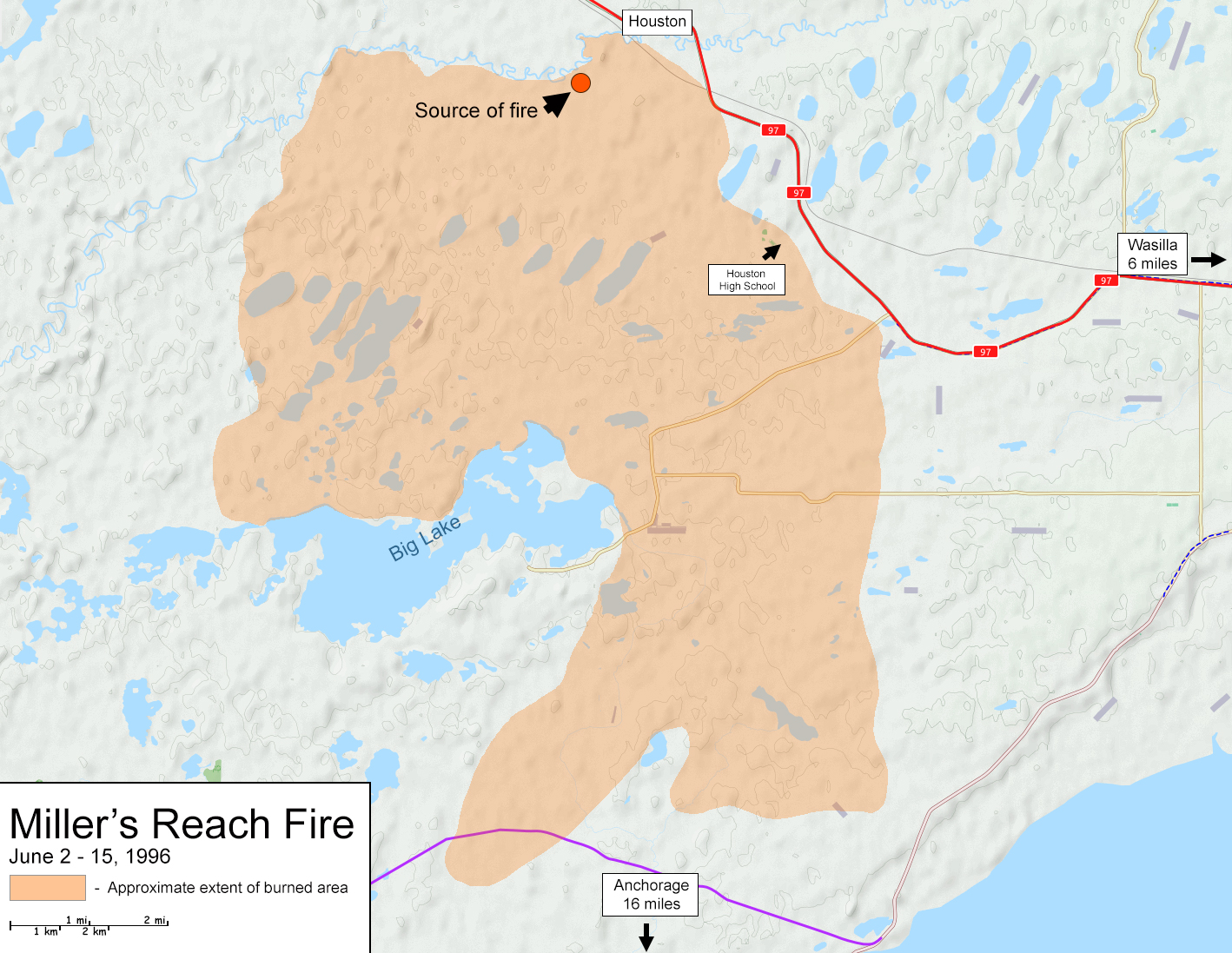
- Extent of the burned area in the fire
- Date: June 2, 1996 – June 15, 1996
- Location: Near Houston, Alaska, United States
- Coordinates: 61.617°N 149.855°W

Statistics
- Burned area: 37,336 acres (151 km^{2})

Impacts
- Deaths: 0
- Structures lost: 344
- Cost: >$10 million

Ignition
- Cause: Uncertain; likely due to mishandling of fireworks

The Miller’s Reach Fire, also known as the Big Lake Fire, was a wildfire that began on June 2, 1996 in an area around Miller’s Reach Road near Houston, Alaska, approximately 33 miles (53 km) north of Anchorage, Alaska. The fire burned over 37,000 acres (15,000 ha), destroyed at least 344 structures, and caused more than $10 million in damage to structures and property. The fire was at the time the most destructive in Alaska history, consuming more structures than all other wildfires in Alaskan history combined. 37 fire departments and 1,800 firefighting and support personnel responded to the fire. It took nearly two weeks to completely control the fire.

== Circumstances before the fire ==
The region where the fire occurred consists of flat terrain with occasional low rolling hills less than 80 meters (260 ft) in height. Boreal forest predominates in the area, composed mostly of black spruce, with some birch, alder, white spruce, and cottonwood. A very thick undergrowth was present at the time of the fire.

A drought began in the area in September 1995, some nine months before the fire. During the winter of 1995/1996, the area received less than 30% of its normal precipitation. Due to the lack of snowfall, the ground froze to a depth of as much as 3 meters (9.8 ft). With the ground frozen so deep, the spring thaw of accumulated snow ran off into streams in the area rather than being subsumed into the ground. Drought conditions with humidities lower than 25% persisted in the region prior to the inception of the fire.

== Evolution of the fire ==
Around 4:00 p.m. local time on June 2, a fire began in the Miller's Reach Road area. The fire was contained within six hours after burning approximately 62 acres (25 ha). A few hot spots remained, which were expected to be resolved by the next day.

On June 3, the weather during the day consisted of light winds out of the southwest, fair skies, and moderate humidity. A cold front passed through the area, and by 7:20 p.m. the winds had shifted around into the northwest and had increased to 33 miles per hour (53 km/h) and humidity had dropped to 20%. The fire reignited and spread out of control. As a result of the sustained drought, the predominant black spruce were drier than normal and became the primary fuel for the fire. This resulted in a crown fire. Within four hours, the fire had spread south 4.5 miles (7.2 km). The Alaska Division of Forestry incident commander called for an evacuation of neighborhoods in the Big Lake area. Many people defied the evacuation order, including Iditarod Trail Sled Dog Race champion Martin Buser. By the evening, 1,500 acres (610 ha) were involved in the fire.

On the morning of June 4, a red flag warning was issued by the Anchorage Weather Service Forecast Office, due to high winds, high temperatures, and low humidity. The fire continued to rapidly spread through the canopy of the forest. The fire reached the northeast shore of Big Lake by the afternoon. The fire had burned 12,000 acres (4,900 ha). The initial command and control center was placed at Houston High School, about three miles southeast of the ignition point of the fire. As the fire and the response from local, state and federal authorities grew, a unified command structure was established at Creekside Plaza in Wasilla, Alaska, about 12 miles further east. Governor Tony Knowles issued a State Disaster Declaration.

By June 5, the fire had spread west along the north shore and south along the east shore of Big Lake. Winds gusted to more than 30 miles (48 km) from both the north and the southeast during the day, but dropped to a light breeze later in the day. Smoke rose as high as 15,000 feet (4,600 m) into the sky.

By June 7, reports indicated the fire was slowing down. On June 8, President Clinton signed Federal Disaster Declaration AK-1119-DR, making federal disaster relief funding available. This funding eventually exceeded $8 million. On June 10, the fire was declared to be contained. On June 15, the fire was declared to be under control.

== Aftermath ==
The Big Lake, Alaska area suffered significant and sustained economic loss. Rail and road transportation between Anchorage and Fairbanks was temporarily cut off. Following the fire, funds exceeding $1.5 million were made available for wildfire mitigation measures.

In 1998, a class action lawsuit seeking approximately $100 million in damages was brought against the State of Alaska alleging the state mismanaged the fire. In 2003, a unanimous jury ruled in favor of the state.

== Sources ==
- Hufford, Gary L.; Kelley, H. Lee; Sparkman, William; Moore, Raymond K. (1998), "Use of Real-Time Multisatellite and Radar Data to Support Forest Fire Management", Weather and Forecasting, 13 (3): 592–605, Bibcode:1998WtFor..13..592H, doi:10.1175/1520-0434(1998)013<0592:UORTMA>2.0.CO;2
