= KDJF =

Radio station in Ester–Fairbanks, Alaska

- Ester, Alaska; United States
- Broadcast area: Fairbanks, Alaska
- Frequency: 93.5 MHz
- Branding: 93-5 Chet FM

Programming
- Format: Country

Ownership
- Owner: Tor Ingstad Licenses, LLC
- Sister stations: KYSC

History
- First air date: 2008

Technical information
- Licensing authority: FCC
- Facility ID: 164233
- Class: C1
- ERP: 15,500 watts
- HAAT: 481 m (1,578 ft)
- Transmitter coordinates: 64°52′45″N 148°03′14″W

Links
- Public license information: Public file; LMS
- Webcast: KDJF Webstream
- Website: KDJF Online

KDJF (93.5 FM) is a radio station licensed to serve Ester, Alaska; however, the station's offices are in Fairbanks, Alaska. Like many other radio stations in the area (such as North Pole's KJNP-FM), its tower is located on Ester Dome. The station is owned by Tor Ingstad Licenses, LLC. It airs a country music format. Programming on KDJF includes the syndicated Rick and Bubba Show on mornings.

The station was assigned the KDJF call letters by the Federal Communications Commission on November 21, 2005.
