= KSKO-FM =

Non-commercial radio station in McGrath, Alaska

Coordinates: 62°55′57″N 155°31′7″W

- McGrath, Alaska; United States
- Broadcast area: Alaska Bush
- Frequency: 89.5 MHz
- Branding: KSKO

Programming
- Format: Variety (radio)

Ownership
- Owner: Kuskokwin Public Broadcasting Corporation

History
- First air date: July 1, 1981; 44 years ago

Technical information
- Licensing authority: FCC
- Facility ID: 198148
- Class: D
- ERP: 90 watts
- HAAT: -25 meters

Links
- Public license information: Public file; LMS
- Website: www.kskopublicradio.com

KSKO-FM is a non-commercial radio station in McGrath, Alaska, broadcasting on 89.5 FM. KSKO is rebroadcast on Class D FM repeaters full time in Grayling, Shageluk, Holy Cross, Nikolai, and Anvik. For part of the day, KSKO is also rebroadcast on KZPA 900 in Fort Yukon and KRFF 89.1 in Fairbanks; KSKO also rebroadcasts a midday show from KRFF. Two new "repeaters" were built in the summer and fall of 2021, KSKC Crooked Creek and KSKP Sleetmute which added 200 people to KSKO's "population served" count for a total of about 1,200 on owned and operated repeaters/signals across a stretch of 200 miles or so along the west central interior.

The station began broadcasting on July 1, 1981, initially on a frequency of 870 kHz on the AM dial. Station owners Kuskokwin Public Broadcasting Corporation switched from AM to FM in 2015. This switch was made after the AM, which was generator powered 24/7 south of the village, became too costly to operate at over $6 a gallon of generator fuel. KSKO-FM 89.5 is on city commercial power at the studio and the repeaters are located at schools, which are on their villages' commercial power.

KSKO celebrated its 40th anniversary on July 1, 2021.

KSKO holds the annual "Back to Bluegrass" music festival in McGrath, which is held in June or July featuring local and regional musicians. The event is a fundraiser for KSKO.

== Repeaters ==
Call sign	Frequency	City of license	FID	Power (W)	ERP (W)	HAAT	Class
KMGS	89.5 FM	Anvik, Alaska	189897	—	270	57 m (187 ft)	D
KSKC	89.5 FM	Crooked Creek, Alaska	198150	—	90	−137 m (−449 ft)	D
KLOP	91.5 FM	Holy Cross, Alaska	189898	—	50	−9 m (−30 ft)	D
KRFF (Note: KSKO programming is shared on this station for part of the day.)	89.1 FM	Fairbanks, Alaska	173890	—	10,000	474 m (1,555 ft)	C1
KZPA	900 AM	Fort Yukon, Alaska	25701	5,000	—	—	B
KGYA	90.5 FM	Grayling, Alaska	190173	—	50	−71 m (−233 ft)	D
KNIB	89.5 FM	Nikolai, Alaska	198149	—	90	9 m (30 ft)	D
KNKO	88.5 FM	Shageluk, Alaska	189899	—	50	−9 m (−30 ft)	D
KSKP	89.5 FM	Sleetmute, Alaska	198151	—	90	−58 m (−190 ft)	D
