= KIAM (AM) =

Radio station in Nenana, Alaska

Coordinates: 64°28′41.3″N 149°05′18.6″W

- Nenana, Alaska; United States
- Broadcast area: Fairbanks, Alaska
- Frequency: 630 kHz

Programming
- Format: Religious

Ownership
- Owner: Voice for Christ Ministries, Inc.
- Sister stations: KIAM-FM, KAGV, KYKD

History
- First air date: June 28, 1985

Technical information
- Licensing authority: FCC
- Class: B
- Power: 10,000 watts day 3,100 watts night
- Translator: see below

Links
- Public license information: Public file; LMS
- Webcast: Listen Live
- Website: KIAM website

KIAM (630 kHz) is an AM radio station broadcasting a religious format. Licensed to Nenana, Alaska, United States, the station serves the Alaska Interior area. The station is currently owned by Voice for Christ Ministries, Inc.

Logo before 91.9 simulcast

== Translators ==
In addition to the main station, KIAM has an additional 15 translators to widen its broadcast area.

Broadcast translators for KIAM
Call sign	Frequency	City of license	FID	FCC info
K221AA	92.1 FM	Bettles, Alaska	70439	LMS
K232DZ	94.3 FM	McGrath, Alaska	139016	LMS
K232DJ	94.3 FM	Perryville, Alaska	139017	LMS
K232DI	94.3 FM	Prudhoe Bay, Alaska	139019	LMS
K241AB	96.1 FM	Ruby, Alaska	70441	LMS
K221DI	92.1 FM	Tanana, Alaska	70440	LMS
