= KIYU-FM =

Public radio station in Galena, Alaska

- Galena, Alaska; United States
- Broadcast area: Alaska Bush
- Frequency: 88.1 MHz
- Branding: KIYU

Programming
- Format: Public radio
- Affiliations: Alaska Public Radio Network; NPR

Ownership
- Owner: Big River Public Broadcasting Corporation

History
- First air date: July 4, 1986

Technical information
- Licensing authority: FCC
- Facility ID: 178861
- Class: D
- ERP: 100 watts
- HAAT: 15 meters (49 ft)
- Transmitter coordinates: 64°44′34″N 156°50′30″W

Links
- Public license information: Public file; LMS
- Webcast: Listen live (via TuneIn)
- Website: kiyu.com

KIYU-FM is a Public Radio formatted broadcast radio station licensed to Galena, Alaska, serving the Alaska Bush. KIYU is owned and operated by Big River Public Broadcasting Corporation.

KIYU had originally broadcast on AM at 910 kHz, but the license for the AM station was surrendered on May 4, 2020. The FM station began broadcasting in 2008, and remains on the air.

== Rebroadcasters ==
In addition to the main station, KIYU is relayed on 10 full-power FM repeaters to widen its broadcast area. KIYU programming is also simulcast on KRFF in Fairbanks, weekday afternoons.

Call sign	Frequency	City of license	FID	ERP (W)	HAAT	Class	Transmitter coordinates	FCC info	Notes
KALG	98.1 FM	Kaltag, Alaska	178864	100	−77 m (−253 ft)	D	64°19′40″N 158°43′36″W	LMS	
KAMN	98.1 FM	Iliamna, Alaska	180624	100	−47 m (−154 ft)	D	59°45′17″N 154°52′15″W	LMS	
KHUS	98.1 FM	Huslia, Alaska	178866	36	57 m (187 ft)	D	65°41′48″N 156°21′52″W	LMS	
KHUU	97.1 FM	Hughes, Alaska	199395	87	−164 m (−538 ft)	D	66°2′50″N 154°15′20″W	LMS	
KKET	95.9 FM	Allakaket, Alaska	199490	99	−44.4 m (−146 ft)	D	66°33′53″N 152°38′38″W	LMS	
KNUL	99.1 FM	Nulato, Alaska	178863	100	5 m (16 ft)	D	64°43′59″N 158°6′25″W	LMS	
KOYU	98.1 FM	Koyukuk, Alaska	178865	100	−7 m (−23 ft)	D	64°52′58″N 157°42′10″W	LMS	
KRBY	98.1 FM	Ruby, Alaska	178862	100	−21 m (−69 ft)	D	64°44′20″N 155°28′48″W	LMS	
KSYU	98.1 FM	Saint Marys, Alaska	180724	53	40 m (131 ft)	D	62°3′11.0″N 163°10′40.2″W	LMS	
KTYU	99.1 FM	Tanana, Alaska	197861	7	108.8 m (357 ft)	D	65°10′52.6″N 151°59′4.1″W	LMS	
