= KFAT (FM) =

Radio station in Anchorage, Alaska

- Anchorage, Alaska; United States
- Frequency: 92.9 MHz
- Branding: 92.9 K-Fat

Programming
- Format: Rhythmic Top 40

Ownership
- Owner: Ohana Media Group; (OMG FCC Licenses LLC)
- Sister stations: KBBO-FM; KBYR; KMBQ-FM; KRAK; KXLW

History
- First air date: 1990
- Former call signs: KWQJ (1990–1997)

Technical information
- Licensing authority: FCC
- Facility ID: 221
- Class: C2
- ERP: 10,000 watts
- HAAT: 270 meters (890 ft)
- Transmitter coordinates: 61°20′11″N 149°30′48″W

Links
- Public license information: Public file; LMS
- Website: kfat929.com

KFAT (92.9 MHz, "K-Fat") is a rhythmic CHR-formatted FM radio station licensed to serve Anchorage, Alaska. The station is owned by Ohana Media Group. Its studios are located in Downtown Anchorage and its transmitter is in Eagle River, Alaska.

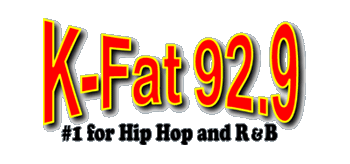
former logo

The station was assigned the call letters KWQJ on October 3, 1990. On February 7, 1997, it changed its call sign to KFAT.
