= KCFT-CD =

Television station in Anchorage, Alaska

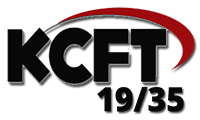
- Anchorage, Alaska; United States
- Channels: Digital: 35 (UHF); Virtual: 35

Programming
- Affiliations: 35.1: Religious Independent; for others, see § Subchannels

Ownership
- Owner: CBI Media Group; (Alaska Broadcast Television, Inc.)
- Sister stations: KAFC, KATB, KVNT

History
- First air date: July 11, 1984
- Former call signs: K20AG (1984–1994); KCFT-LP (1994–2013)
- Former channel numbers: Analog: 20 (UHF, 1984–2011)
- Former affiliations: American Christian Television System (1984–1995); FamilyNet (1995–2017)
- Call sign meaning: "Christian Family Television"

Technical information
- Licensing authority: FCC
- Facility ID: 787
- Class: CD
- ERP: 15 kW
- HAAT: 171.6 m (563 ft)
- Transmitter coordinates: 61°4′0″N 149°44′44″W

Links
- Public license information: Public file; LMS
- Website: kcft.org

KCFT-CD (channel 35) is a low-power, Class A television station in Anchorage, Alaska, United States. It is owned by CBI Media Group alongside radio stations KATB (89.3 FM), KAFC (93.7 FM), and KVNT (1020 AM). The stations share studios on Northern Lights Boulevard in Anchorage. KCFT-CD features a variety of Christian talk and teaching programs.

In 1983, the American Christian Television System (ACTS) won the ability to build a low-power TV station on channel 20 in Anchorage as part of an FCC lottery. ACTS, a division of the Southern Baptist Convention, began constructing studios on 1/4 Mile O'Malley Road and network reception facilities in downtown Anchorage. K20AG began broadcasting on July 11, 1984. It was the second station built by ACTS after one in Tyler, Texas. By January 1995, when it became KCFT-LP, it was affiliated with FamilyNet.

At various times in its history, the station has broadcast local sports, including Anchorage Pilots baseball in 1986 and Alaska Anchorage Seawolves in the 2000s.

== Subchannels ==
The station's signal is multiplexed:

Subchannels of KCFT-CD
Channel	Res.	Short name	Programming
35.1	1080i	KCFT-LP	Religious Independent
35.2	Audio only	KCFT-LP	KATB (Christian talk/teaching)
35.3	Audio only	KCFT-LP	KAFC (CCM)
35.4	Audio only	KCFT-LP	KVNT (News/Talk)
