= Augie Hiebert =

American television executive

August Gottlob Hiebert (December 4, 1916 – September 13, 2007) was an American television executive. Hiebert is credited with building Alaska's first television station, KTVA in Anchorage in 1953. He is often called the "father of Alaskan television."

== Early life ==
Augie Hiebert was born in Trinidad, Washington. Fascinated with electronics as a teenager, he built his first amateur radio in Bend, Oregon, when he was only 15. He landed his first job in Wenatchee, Washington, at a radio station after graduating from high school. He worked his way up from an announcer to a station engineer at another radio station in Bend.

== Alaskan television and radio ==
=== Alaskan radio ===
In 1939, Hiebert followed one of his Bend, Oregon, co-workers, Austin E. "Cap" Lathrop, to Fairbanks, Alaska, where they built the city's first radio station, KFAR.

On December 7, 1941, Heibert, at his KFAR radio station in Fairbanks, was the first Alaskan to hear the news of the Japanese attack at Pearl Harbor. He alerted the military.

Hiebert helped to set up KENI, another AM station, in Anchorage in 1948.

Additionally, Hiebert established Alaska's first FM radio station, KNIK, in Anchorage in 1960.

Hiebert's first Satellite AM radio station was KBYR programmed and formatted by Broadcasters Hall Of Fame Inductee Rod Williams.

=== Alaskan television ===
Hiebert founded Northern Television, an Alaska-based production and broadcasting company. Hiebert and his small company would help found many of Alaska's original television station. (Hiebert sold Northern Television in 1997.)

In 1953 Hiebert and his company built Alaska's first television station, KTVA, in Anchorage. The station initially offered local news, as well as some television programs and feature films. KTVA only broadcast for a few hours a day in its early years. All of its network programming had to be physically flown in as film or kinescope from the mainland United States, since there were no satellite broadcasting or nearby antenna broadcasts available in Alaska in those days.

In 1955, just two years after launching KTVA, Hiebert founded KTVF, Alaska's second television station, in Fairbanks.

Hiebert worked behind the scenes to bring live coverage of Neil Armstrong's walk on the Moon on July 20, 1969. The lunar live coverage was a coup for Hiebert and Alaska, since live coverage of events usually had to be pre-taped and shipped to the state in the late 1960s. Hiebert and other station owners negotiated with the U.S. military and the Alaskan congressional delegation to bring a live satellite feed of the landing to Alaska.

Hiebert was advocate for the special needs of Alaska's broadcasters. He organized 'Alaska Days' for Federal Communications Commission to educate members about the difficulties of broadcasting in a vast and sparsely populated state such as Alaska.

== Retirement ==
Hiebert retired in 1997 at the age of 80 and sold his company, Northern Television the same year. However, he continued to be active in broadcasting after his retirement. He focused much of his energy on establishing a video-news program for Mirror Lake Middle School. He also worked with the Federal Communications Commission (FCC) to get Mirror Lake's FM radio station, KAUG, federally licensed. KAUG was the first middle school radio station in the United States to be licensed by the FCC.

In 2003, Heibert was commended by the U.S. Senate for his service to the Alaska Communications industry.

== Death ==
Hiebert died in Anchorage, Alaska on September 13, 2007 at the age of 90. He had recently been diagnosed with non-Hodgkin's lymphoma. Veteran television newscaster and journalist Walter Cronkite released a prepared statement on the news of Hiebert's death, "The great state of Alaska has lost one of its most distinguished citizens. Augie Hiebert was the pioneer of communications who brought radio and later television to his beloved home state."
