= KRAW =

Coordinates: 60.5322°N 151.0833°W

KWMD
- Sterling, Alaska; United States
- Broadcast area: Kenai, Alaska
- Frequency: 90.1 MHz

Programming
- Format: Defunct

Ownership
- Owner: Alaska Educational Radio System

History
- Former call signs: KWMD (2003–2010)

Technical information
- Facility ID: 93589
- Class: A
- ERP: 1,200 watts
- HAAT: 6 meters

KRAW was a non-commercial radio station in Sterling, Alaska, broadcasting to the Kenai, Alaska, area on 90.1 FM. KRAW signed on as KWMD on July 26, 2003, programming a non-commercial modern rock format.

KRAW ceased continuous broadcast on August 2, 2004, pending FCC approval of technical changes between several Alaska Educational Radio System (AERS) stations including a change in frequency. However, KRAW periodically broadcast for short periods to maintain the license. On March 10, 2008, AERS filed with the FCC for alternative technical changes to the station’s license/facilities..

KRAW's license expired on May 18, 2013, due to the station having been dark for more than a year. The FCC deleted the KRAW call sign from their database on February 5, 2014.
