= KZPA =

Radio station in Fort Yukon, Alaska

- Fort Yukon, Alaska; United States
- Broadcast area: Yukon Flats
- Frequency: 900 kHz
- Branding: KZPA Radio 900

Programming
- Languages: English, Gwich'in, Athabaskan
- Format: Full-service and public radio
- Affiliations: CHON-FM; KRFF; KSKO-FM; NPR; PRX

Ownership
- Owner: Gwandak Public Broadcasting, Inc.

History
- First air date: September 30, 1993

Technical information
- Licensing authority: FCC
- Facility ID: 25701
- Class: B
- Power: 5,000 watts (unlimited)
- Transmitter coordinates: 66°33′22.8″N 145°12′13.4″W

Links
- Public license information: Public file; LMS
- Webcast: Listen live
- Website: kzparadio.org

KZPA is a full-service formatted broadcast radio station. The station is licensed to Fort Yukon, Alaska and serves Yukon Flats in far Northwestern Alaska. KZPA is owned and operated by Gwandak Public Broadcasting, Inc.

KZPA launched on September 30, 1993. It derives part of its programming from KSKO-FM in McGrath, Alaska, KRFF in Fairbanks, Alaska, and CHON-FM in Whitehorse, Yukon.
