= KRAK (FM) =

Coordinates: 61.119°N 149.897°W

- Anchorage, Alaska; United States
- Frequency: 102.1 MHz
- Branding: Rock 102.1

Programming
- Format: Active rock

Ownership
- Owner: Ohana Media Group; (OMG FCC Licenses LLC)
- Sister stations: KBBO-FM; KBYR; KFAT; KMBQ-FM; KXLW

History
- First air date: November 6, 1961
- Former call signs: KBYR-FM (1961–1966); KAMU (1966–1969); KWKO (1969–1973); KJZZ (1973–1980); KRKN (1980–1986); KPXR (1986–1994); KKRO (1994–2002); KDBZ (2002–2014); KTMB (2014–2025)
- Call sign meaning: Sounds like "rock", "Rock Alaska"; could also be phonemed to sound like "crack"

Technical information
- Licensing authority: FCC
- Facility ID: 28647
- Class: C3
- ERP: 23,000 watts
- HAAT: 25 meters (82 ft)

Links
- Public license information: Public file; LMS
- Webcast: Listen live
- Website: rock1021.com

KRAK (102.1 MHz, "Rock 102.1") is a commercial FM radio station licensed in Anchorage, Alaska, United States. The station is owned by Ohana Media and broadcasts an active rock format. KRAK's studios are located in Downtown Anchorage and its transmitter is in the city's Bayshore district. It is unique among Anchorage radio stations in that it has no live disc jockeys and guarantees to tell listeners the name and artist of every song played.

== History ==
The station first signed on November 6, 1961, as KBYR-FM. The station went silent for a time after the 1964 Alaska earthquake; it became KAMU in 1966 and KWKO in 1969. From 1967 to 1973, KAMU/KWKO broadcast an easy listening format. During this period, the station's main program was Night Flight. As Anchorage was a major stopover point for various airlines' intercontinental routes, the show featured a unique opening simulating a jet in takeoff mode. Station owner Joe O'Hearn welcomed listeners as the "captain" of the program, and flight attendants representing various international airlines recited safety procedures in their native languages as well as in English.

The station changed its call sign to KJZZ in 1973, then to KRKN in 1980. From 1986 to 1994, the station held the call letters KPXR. In March 1994, the station became KKRO, broadcasting classic rock as "Arrow" until 2002. In 1997, Ingstad AK Broadcasting, Inc. sold KKRO to Williams Broadcasting, Inc. for $850,000.

On September 7, 2011, at 12:01 a.m., the then-KDBZ changed its format from hot adult contemporary (branded as "102.1 The Buzz") to adult album alternative (AAA), branded as "102.1 The Peak".

Logo for KTMB as "Oldies 102.1"

On March 7, 2014 KDBZ flipped to classic hits as "Oldies 102.1". The station would eventually change its call sign to KTMB, and would, by the end of its run, rebrand the format as "Classic Hits 102.1 KTMB".

On November 30, 2025, KTMB changed its call letters to KRAK; despite this, the station would continue to run under the "KTMB" brand until May 2026, when Ohana Media Group announced that KRAK would flip to active rock as "Rock 102.1" at 10:21 a.m. on May 22, ahead of the upcoming Memorial Day weekend; the station is led by former KWHL host Brad "The Beard" Stennett, who explained in a Facebook post when asked about the move that he was piqued to suggest the move to Ohana following the death of Ozzy Osbourne the previous year, realizing they did not have a station in their cluster focused straightforward to a male audience and seeking to fill that hole with the move.
