= KXBA =

Coordinates: 60.510°N 151.272°W

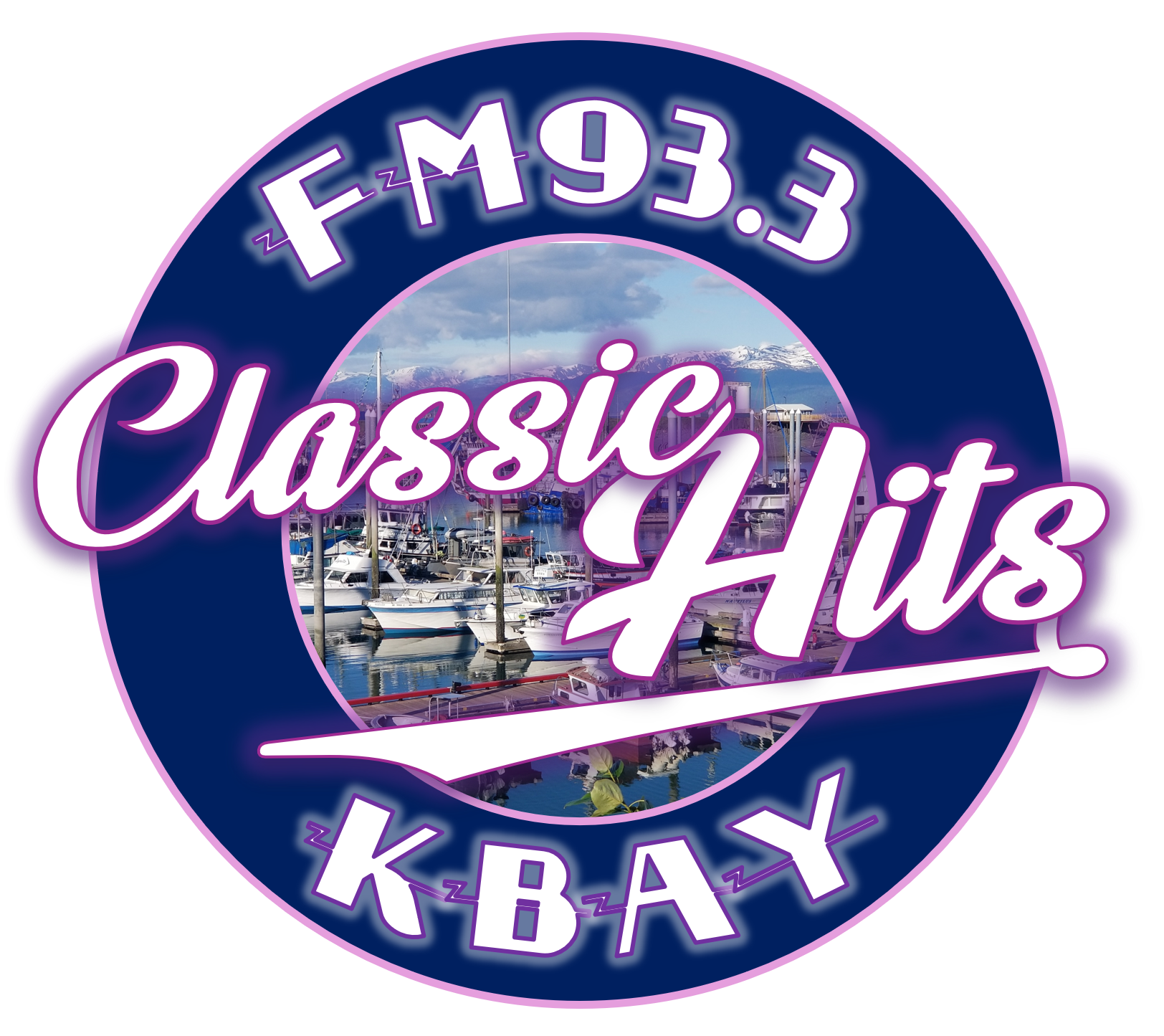
- Nikiski, Alaska; United States
- Broadcast area: Kenai, Alaska
- Frequency: 93.3 MHz
- Branding: K-Bay 93.3 Classic Hits

Programming
- Format: Classic hits

Ownership
- Owner: Peninsula Radio Group Inc.
- Sister stations: KPEN-FM, KWVV, KGTL, KPEN-AM

History
- Call sign meaning: K X BAY

Technical information
- Licensing authority: FCC
- Facility ID: 86717
- Class: C2
- ERP: 50,000 watts
- HAAT: 74 meters (243 ft)
- Translators: 92.3 K222DK (Unalaska); 92.7 K224DX (Seward); 102.5 K273CM (Soldotna); 104.5 K283CS (Seward-Woodrow); 104.9 K285FU (Unalaska); 106.1 K291BH (Kenai)

Links
- Public license information: Public file; LMS
- Website: kbayfm.com

KXBA (93.3 FM, "K-Bay 93.3 Classic Hits") is a commercial radio station in Nikiski, Alaska, broadcasting to the Kenai, Alaska area.

KXBA airs a classic hits music format.

The station, and its sister stations, were purchased in November of 2024 from Peninsula Communications Inc, by Peninsula Radio Group Inc.
