= KSRM =

Coordinates: 60°30′46.9″N 151°11′27″W

- Soldotna, Alaska; United States
- Broadcast area: Kenai, Alaska
- Frequency: 920 kHz
- Branding: KSRM 920AM & 92.5FM

Programming
- Format: News/talk
- Affiliations: ABC News Radio; Fox News Radio; NBC News Radio; Compass Media Networks; Genesis Communications Network; Premiere Networks; Salem Radio Network; USA Radio Network; Westwood One; Seattle Kraken; Seattle Seahawks

Ownership
- Owner: Matt Wilson; (KSRM Radio Group, Inc.)
- Sister stations: KFSE, KKIS-FM, KKNI-FM, KSLD, KWHQ-FM

History
- First air date: November 23, 1967

Technical information
- Licensing authority: FCC
- Facility ID: 35635
- Class: B
- Power: 5,000 watts unlimited
- Translator: 92.5 K223DG (Soldotna)

Links
- Public license information: Public file; LMS
- Webcast: Listen Live
- Website: KSRM Online

KSRM (920 AM) is a commercial radio station programming talk in Soldotna, Alaska, broadcasting to the Kenai, Alaska, area.

Logo before translator sign on
