= KHZK =

Kotzebue, Alaska; United States
- Frequency: 103.9 MHz

Programming
- Format: Defunct (formerly Religious)

Ownership
- Owner: Horizon Christian Fellowship

Technical information
- Licensing authority: FCC
- Facility ID: 164295
- Class: A
- ERP: 200 watts
- HAAT: 14 meters (46 feet)
- Transmitter coordinates: 66°54′11″N 162°34′16″W

Links
- Public license information: Public file; LMS

KHZK (103.9 FM) was a radio station licensed to serve Kotzebue, Alaska. The station was owned by Horizon Christian Fellowship. It aired a religious radio format.

The station had been assigned these call letters by the Federal Communications Commission (FCC) since March 29, 2006.

The station was started and operated by Keith and Kelly Kendall, from Julian, California.

The station's license was cancelled by the FCC on May 13, 2013.
