= KAUG =

Radio station of the Anchorage School District in Anchorage, Alaska

Anchorage, Alaska; United States
- Frequency: 89.9 MHz

Programming
- Format: Variety

Ownership
- Owner: Anchorage School District

History
- First air date: 2007
- Last air date: February 2, 2022
- Call sign meaning: A reference to Augie Hiebert, who assisted in putting the station on the air

Technical information
- Licensing authority: FCC
- Facility ID: 165582
- Class: D
- ERP: 4 watts
- HAAT: 30 meters (98 feet)
- Transmitter coordinates: 61°24′33″N 149°25′15″W

Links
- Public license information: Public file; LMS

KAUG (89.9 FM) was a radio station licensed to serve Anchorage, Alaska. The station was last owned by the Anchorage School District. It aired a variety format.

The station was assigned the KAUG call letters by the Federal Communications Commission (FCC) on August 7, 2007. The FCC cancelled the station's license and deleted its call sign on February 2, 2022, for failure to file an application for license renewal.
