= KICY (AM) =

Coordinates: 64°29′15″N 165°18′53″W

- Nome, Alaska; United States
- Broadcast area: Alaska Bush
- Frequency: 850 kHz
- Branding: AM 850

Programming
- Format: Religious
- Affiliations: Moody Radio; Salem Radio Network

Ownership
- Owner: Arctic Broadcasting Association
- Sister stations: KICY-FM

History
- First air date: 1960
- Call sign meaning: ICY conditions in northern Alaska

Technical information
- Licensing authority: FCC
- Class: A
- Power: 50,000 watts
- Translator: (97.3 MHz) K247CV (Elim)

Links
- Public license information: Public file; LMS
- Webcast: Listen Live
- Website: KICY website

KICY is a commercial radio station airing Southern Gospel music and other Christian religious programming in Nome, Alaska, broadcasting on 850 AM. From the 11:00 PM to 4:00 AM critical hours the station transmits with a three-tower directional array located slightly east of Nome, and pointing due west into Siberia, Russia and airs Russian language programming.

KICY started broadcasting in 1960.
