= KWHQ-FM =

Coordinates: 60.513°N 151.191°W

- Kenai, Alaska; United States
- Broadcast area: Kenai, Alaska
- Frequency: 100.1 (MHz)
- Branding: Q-100 The Point

Programming
- Format: Country

Ownership
- Owner: Matt Wilson; (KSRM Radio Group, Inc.)
- Sister stations: KFSE, KKIS-FM, KKNI-FM, KSLD, KSRM

History
- Former call signs: KQOK

Technical information
- Facility ID: 35636
- Class: C3
- ERP: 25,000 watts
- HAAT: 58 meters (190 ft)

Links
- Webcast: Listen Live
- Website: radiokenai.net/stations/kwhq-100-1fm/

KWHQ-FM (100.1 FM, "Q-100 The Point") is a commercial country music radio station in Kenai, Alaska.
