= KKIS-FM =

Coordinates: 60.523°N 151.059°W

- Soldotna, Alaska; United States
- Broadcast area: Kenai, Alaska
- Frequency: 96.5 MHz
- Branding: 96.5 KKIS FM

Programming
- Format: Contemporary hit radio

Ownership
- Owner: Matt Wilson; (KSRM Radio Group, Inc.)
- Sister stations: KFSE; KKNI-FM; KSLD; KSRM; KWHQ-FM

Technical information
- Licensing authority: FCC
- Facility ID: 34883
- Class: C3
- ERP: 10,000 watts
- HAAT: 79 meters (259 ft)

Links
- Public license information: Public file; LMS
- Webcast: Listen Live
- Website: streamdb6web.securenetsystems.net/cirruscontent/KKIS

KKIS-FM (96.5 FM) is a commercial contemporary hit radio music radio station in Soldotna, Alaska, broadcasting to the Kenai, Alaska, area.

== Other history ==
Call sign KKIS was previously used by an FM station in Walnut Creek, California at 92.1 MHz, and an AM station in Pittsburg, California at 990 kHz.
