= KGTL =

- Homer, Alaska; United States
- Broadcast area: South Central Alaska
- Frequency: 620 kHz
- Branding: AM 620 The Answer

Programming
- Format: News/Talk
- Affiliations: Fox News Radio; Compass Media Networks; Salem Radio Network; Premiere Networks; Westwood One

Ownership
- Owner: Peninsula Radio Group, Inc.
- Sister stations: KPEN-FM, KWVV, KXBA, KPEN (AM)

History
- Former call signs: KTGL, KPEN

Technical information
- Licensing authority: FCC
- Facility ID: 52152
- Class: B
- Power: 5,000 watts (unlimited)
- Transmitter coordinates: 59°41′0.8″N 151°37′58.7″W
- Translator: See § Translators

Links
- Public license information: Public file; LMS
- Website: https://kgtltheanswer.com

KGTL (620 AM) is a radio station licensed to serve Homer, Alaska. The station is owned by Peninsula Radio Group, Inc. It airs a news/talk format.

The station, and its sister stations, were purchased in November of 2024 from Peninsula Communications Inc, by Peninsula Radio Group Inc.

The station was assigned these call letters by the U.S. Federal Communications Commission (FCC) on July 17, 1987.

The price of electricity was increased by 47% in July 2008. In February 2009 KGTL applied for Special Temporary Authority from the FCC to operate with 2,500 watts full-time.

== Translators ==
Broadcast translators for KGTL
Call sign	Frequency	City of license	FID	FCC info
K261DV	100.1 FM	Homer, Alaska	142498	LMS
K265CK	100.9 FM	Kachemak City, Alaska	52154	LMS
K274DD	102.7 FM	Ninilchik, Alaska	203204	LMS
K290AA	105.9 FM	Seldovia, Alaska	52163	LMS
K272DG	102.3 FM	Seward, Alaska	52160	LMS
