= KJNP (AM) =

Radio station in North Pole, Alaska

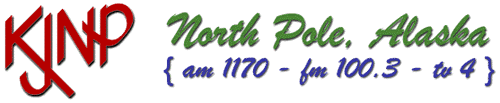
- North Pole, Alaska; United States
- Broadcast area: Fairbanks, Alaska
- Frequency: 1170 kHz
- Branding: 1170 KJNP-AM

Programming
- Format: Christian radio

Ownership
- Owner: Evangelistic Alaska Missionary Fellowship, Inc.
- Sister stations: KJNP-FM

History
- First air date: October 11, 1967
- Call sign meaning: King Jesus North Pole

Technical information
- Licensing authority: FCC
- Facility ID: 19866
- Class: A
- Power: 50,000 watts (day); 21,000 watts (night)
- Transmitter coordinates: 62°45′32.5″N 147°19′34.7″W

Links
- Public license information: Public file; LMS
- Website: KJNP Online

KJHA
- Houston, Alaska; United States
- Frequency: 88.7 MHz
- Branding: King Jesus

Programming
- Format: Christian radio

Ownership
- Owner: Evangelistic Alaska Missionary Fellowship, Inc.

History
- Call sign meaning: King Jesus Houston Alaska

Technical information
- Licensing authority: FCC
- Facility ID: 77894
- Class: A
- ERP: 430 watts
- HAAT: 16.5 meters
- Transmitter coordinates: 61°38′42.6″N 149°51′59.6″W

Links
- Public license information: Public file; LMS

KJNP (1170 AM) and KJHA (88.7 FM) are non-commercial radio stations which simulcast their programming. KJNP is licensed to North Pole, Alaska and serves the Fairbanks area. KJHA is licensed to work in Houston, Alaska, just north of Anchorage. The stations air a Christian radio format.

KJNP's radio studios and transmitter are located a short distance northeast of the city center of North Pole, off the Richardson Highway. KJNP is a Class A station broadcasting on the clear-channel frequency of 1170 AM.

KJHA's transmitter is off Route 3, South Parks Highway, north of Houston.

In addition to the main stations, programming is relayed by an additional five FM translators to widen its broadcast area.

Broadcast translators for KJNP
Call sign	Frequency	City of license	FID	ERP (W)	Class	FCC info
K296DI	107.1 FM	Barrow, Alaska	20021	20 vertical	D	LMS
K285DQ	104.9 FM	Circle, Alaska	20009	140	D	LMS
K296DU	107.1 FM	Dot Lake, Alaska	20011	160 horizontal	D	LMS
K296BG	107.1 FM	Fort Yukon, Alaska	20013	4 vertical	D	LMS
K285DR	104.9 FM	Tok, Alaska	20014	138 vertical	D	LMS

These radio stations were founded by Don and Gen Nelson; the former died in 1997, and The later died in 2009. The AM incarnation of KJNP was the first of these stations, launched in 1967. KJNP-FM and KJNP-TV both followed in 1981. KJHA followed many years later.

In addition to the broadcasting ministry, Don Nelson made scores of road trips over the course of several decades between Alaska and his home state of Minnesota, conducting another ministry along the Alaska Highway and in numerous small towns in Canada.

The station airs one of the few non-English-language programs heard in the Fairbanks area, a weekly program in Iñupiaq produced by parishioners from First Presbyterian Church of Fairbanks. KJNP is pretty common AM station among Finnish and other Nordic DX listeners during dark winter time as the station has powerful transmitter with favorable antenna pattern and high AM frequency.

== See also ==
- KJNP-FM
- KJNP-TV
