= KSEW (Sitka, Alaska) =

KSEW (1400 AM) was a radio station in Sitka, Alaska.

The frequency began in 1949 as KALA. On September 13, 1954, The 1400 AM frequency was reactivated as KSEW. KSEW was a low-power, multilingual radio station that broadcast in both English and Tlingit. One of the employees of KSEW was Tlingit scholar Walter Soboleff. It was shut down on June 2, 1969, with its license deleted one week later on June 9, 1969. In its early years, KSEW simulcasted programs with KIFW.
