= KWMD =

KRAW
Kasilof, Alaska; United States
- Broadcast area: South Central Alaska area
- Frequency: 90.7 MHz

Programming
- Format: Public Radio
- Affiliations: Pacifica Radio

Ownership
- Owner: Alaska Educational Radio System, Inc.

History
- First air date: 1973
- Former call signs: KWMD

Technical information
- Licensing authority: FCC
- Facility ID: 93248
- Class: A
- ERP: 500 watts
- HAAT: 60 meters
- Transmitter coordinates: 60°22′44″N 151°11′30″W

Links
- Public license information: Public file; LMS

KRAW (90.7 FM) was a Pacifica Radio-affiliated talk radio station. KRAW was licensed to Kasilof, Alaska by the Alaska Educational Radio System (AERS).

The station broadcasts a wide spectrum of pre-recorded and live streamed programs from the Pacifica Radio network and affiliated stations, as well as live programs from local contributors. Additional live and pre-recorded programming is garnered from a variety of local and international broadcasters including KEUL Girdwood, WILL Urbana, Illinois, and others.

It also downloads and broadcasts programs from a wide variety of internet sources and podcasts including Blast the Right, Other Minds radio, Joe Frank, The Black Coffee Channel and acksisofevil.org.

== Service area ==
KRAW itself covers the North and Central Kenai Peninsula. KRAW provides service to additional communities and areas through the following translator:

K300BY, 107.9 MHz, Palmer/Wasilla

AERS plans to simulcast KRAW by Fall 2008 over new full service FM facilities in several additional Alaskan communities including Fairbanks, Homer and Seward.
