= KFSE =

- Kasilof, Alaska; United States
- Frequency: 106.9 MHz
- Branding: The Fuse 106.9 FM

Programming
- Format: Mainstream rock
- Affiliations: United Stations Radio Networks

Ownership
- Owner: Matt Wilson; (KSRM Radio Group, Inc.)
- Sister stations: KKIS-FM, KKNI-FM, KSLD, KSRM, KWHQ-FM

History
- First air date: 2007
- Former call signs: KZNZ (2005–2007)
- Call sign meaning: "Fuse"

Technical information
- Licensing authority: FCC
- Facility ID: 78420
- Class: C3
- ERP: 8,000 watts
- HAAT: 62 meters (203 feet)
- Transmitter coordinates: 60°25′55″N 151°08′26″W

Links
- Public license information: Public file; LMS
- Webcast: Listen live
- Website: KFSE Online

KFSE (106.9 FM) is a radio station licensed to serve Kasilof, Alaska. The station is owned by Matt Wilson, through licensee KSRM Radio Group, Inc. It airs a mainstream rock music format.

The station was assigned the KFSE call sign by the Federal Communications Commission on July 10, 2007. The station flipped to its current format on Thanksgiving Day, November 22, 2007.

KFSE is an affiliate of the syndicated Pink Floyd program "Floydian Slip."
