= KBYR (AM) =

Coordinates: 61°12′23″N 149°55′28″W

- Anchorage, Alaska; United States
- Broadcast area: Anchorage metropolitan area
- Frequency: 700 kHz
- Branding: AM700 KBYR

Programming
- Format: Talk radio
- Affiliations: Compass Media Networks; Radio America; Townhall News; Westwood One

Ownership
- Owner: Ohana Media Group; (OMG FCC Licenses LLC)
- Sister stations: KBBO-FM; KMBQ-FM; KRAK; KXLW

History
- First air date: 1948
- Former frequencies: 1240 kHz (1948–1956); 1270 kHz (1956–1971)

Technical information
- Licensing authority: FCC
- Facility ID: 49612
- Class: A
- Power: 10,000 watts (unlimited)
- Translator: See below

Links
- Public license information: Public file; LMS
- Website: kbyr.com

KBYR (700 AM) is a commercial radio station licensed to Anchorage, Alaska, United States. It airs a talk format and is owned by the Ohana Media Group. The studios are on Gambell Street in Anchorage. Programming is also heard on two FM translator stations.

== History ==
KBYR signed on the air in 1948. Alaska was not yet a state then. KBYR originally broadcast at 1240 kHz and was only powered at 250 watts, a fraction of its current output. It was owned by Aleutian Broadcasters with studios on 4th and B Streets. It moved to 1270 kHz in 1956, then to 700 kHz in 1971.

In the 1970s, KBYR was owned by the Alaska Broadcasting System. It had a full service format, playing middle of the road music, news and sports. KBYR was an affiliate of CBS Radio and the ABC Entertainment Network.

== Programming ==
Dave Stroh is KBYR's lone local personality; the remainder of the schedule is nationally syndicated conservative talk shows, many of which are recorded and delayed due to time zone differences.

Former logo

== Translators ==
In addition to the main station, KBYR is relayed by two FM translators to widen its broadcast area.

Call sign	Frequency	City of license	FID	ERP (W)	Class	FCC info
K261AO	100.1 FM	Arco Base Camp, Alaska	49635	91 horizontal	D	LMS
K203BY	88.5 FM	Kuparuk, Alaska	76790	188	D	LMS
