= KSLD =

Coordinates: 60°31′23.9″N 151°03′31″W

- Soldotna, Alaska; United States
- Broadcast area: Kenai, Alaska
- Frequency: 1140 kHz
- Branding: ESPN 1140AM & 96.9FM

Programming
- Format: Sports
- Affiliations: ESPN Radio; NFL on Westwood One Sports; Peninsula Oilers

Ownership
- Owner: Matt Wilson; (KSRM Radio Group, Inc.)
- Sister stations: KFSE, KKIS-FM, KKNI-FM, KSRM, KWHQ-FM

History
- First air date: February 24, 1984 (as KCSY)
- Former call signs: KCSY (1984–1991)

Technical information
- Licensing authority: FCC
- Facility ID: 34880
- Class: B
- Power: 10,000 watts unlimited
- Translator: 96.9 K245DB (Soldotna)

Links
- Public license information: Public file; LMS
- Webcast: Listen Live
- Website: KSLD Online

KSLD (1140 AM) is a commercial sports radio station in Soldotna, Alaska, in the United States, broadcasting to the Kenai, Alaska, area; it is owned by Matt Wilson, through licensee KSRM Radio Group, Inc.

Logo before translator sign on

1140 AM is a United States and Mexican clear-channel frequency.
