= KSEW (Seward, Alaska) =

- Seward, Alaska; United States
- Broadcast area: South Central Alaska
- Frequency: 950 kHz

Ownership
- Owner: Seward Media Partners, LLC
- Sister stations: KKNI-FM

History
- First air date: 1972
- Last air date: February 1, 2014
- Former call signs: KRXA (1972–1991); KSWD (1991–2008)
- Call sign meaning: Seward

Technical information
- Facility ID: 72209
- Class: B
- Power: 1,000 watts (unlimited)
- Transmitter coordinates: 60°05′27″N 149°20′20″W

KSEW (950 AM) was a radio station licensed to Seward, Alaska, United States. The station was owned by Seward Media Partners, LLC, and aired an adult contemporary music format.

The frequency was previously used by KIBH, which began on December 27, 1948, on 1340 AM before moving to 950 AM in August 1965, was a radio station licensed to Seward, Alaska, before shutting down on July 26, 1969, with its license deleted on August 15, 1969.

The station was first licensed as KRXA on June 21, 1971, and was assigned KSEW by the Federal Communications Commission on May 14, 2008.

Under a previous owner, the station simulcasted with KYSC in Fairbanks for several years.

KSEW's license expired and was deleted on February 1, 2014, after the application for renewal of the station's license was not filed on time. In addition it had not paid FCC fees for a number of years and efforts to collect the debt were unsuccessful.
