= KWVV-FM =

Coordinates: 59.684°N 151.633°W

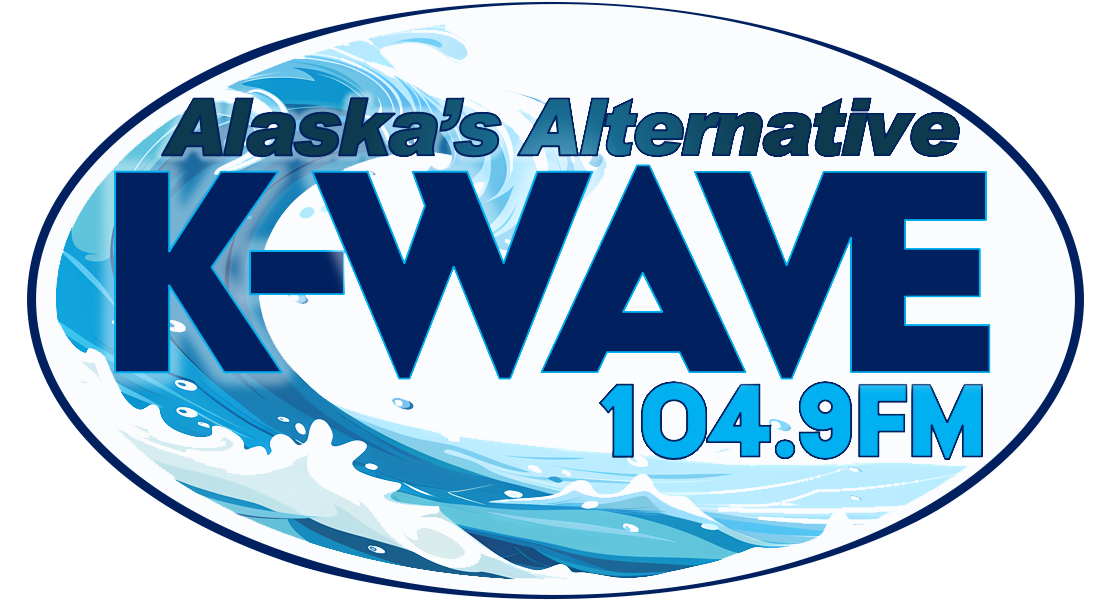
- Homer, Alaska; United States
- Broadcast area: South Central Alaska
- Frequency: 103.5 MHz
- Branding: K-Wave, Alaska's Alternative

Programming
- Format: Alternative rock

Ownership
- Owner: Peninsula Radio Group, Inc.
- Sister stations: KGTL, KPEN-FM, KXBA, KPEN-AM

History
- First air date: 2025|1|1

Technical information
- Licensing authority: FCC
- Facility ID: 52145
- Class: C
- ERP: 25,000 watts
- HAAT: 351 meters (1,152 ft)

Links
- Public license information: Public file; LMS
- Website: alaskasalternative.com

KWVV-FM (103.5 FM, "K-Wave") is a commercial alternative rock music radio station in Homer, Alaska. It changed to this new format on January 1st, 2025.

Prior to the format change on January 1, 2025, K-Wave was an adult album alternative format that KWVV-FM produced programming for in-house.

The station, and its sister stations, were purchased in November of 2024 from Peninsula Communications Inc, by Peninsula Radio Group Inc.

== Translators ==
- K236CC in Seward-Woodrow, Alaska, broadcasting on 95.1 FM.
- K292ED in Kachemak City, Alaska, broadcasting on 106.3 FM.
- K281BA in Delta Junction-Fort Greely, Alaska, broadcasting on 104.1 FM.
- K285DU in Homer, Alaska, broadcasting on 104.9 FM.
- K285EF in Kenai, Alaska, broadcasting on 104.9 FM.
- K285AA in Kodiak, Alaska, broadcasting on 104.9 FM.
- K283AB in Soldotna, Alaska, broadcasting on 104.5 FM.
