= Kiam Building =

Building in Houston, Texas

Coordinates: 29.7690°N 95.3579°W

The Kiam Building is located at 320 Main Street in Downtown Houston. Clothier Ed Kiam commissioned H.C. Holland to design the five-story, brick Romanesque Revival building, which was completed in 1893. The Kiam Building was the first in Houston to operate an electric elevator, and it was wired for electric lighting. Kiam operated his haberdashery on the ground floor and leased rooms on the upper floors as office space. Another retailer, Sakowitz operated in the Kiam Building between 1918 and 1929. Barry Moore completed restoration of the building in 1981. The Greater Houston Preservation Alliance recognized Moore's work with a Good Brick Award the same year.
