= KATB =

Radio station in Anchorage, Alaska

Coordinates: 61.067°N 149.746°W

- Anchorage, Alaska; United States
- Frequency: 89.3 MHz
- Branding: Life Changing Radio

Programming
- Format: Religious radio

Ownership
- Owner: CBI Media Group; (Christian Broadcasting, Inc.)
- Sister stations: KAFC, KVNT, KCFT-CD, KJLP

History
- First air date: June 1985

Technical information
- Licensing authority: FCC
- Facility ID: 10933
- Class: C2
- ERP: 14,500 watts
- HAAT: 202 meters

Links
- Public license information: Public file; LMS
- Webcast: Listen live
- Website: katb.org

KATB (89.3 FM) is a radio station broadcasting a religious radio format. Licensed to Anchorage, Alaska, United States, it serves the Anchorage area. The station is currently owned by Christian Broadcasting Inc radio group.

== Repeaters/Translators ==
- KJLP 88.9 FM, K202CB 88.3 FM, and K214FK 90.7 FM in Palmer, Alaska
- K206AO 89.1 FM in Eagle River, Alaska
