= KDLL =

Public radio station in Kenai, Alaska

Coordinates: 60.567°N 151.126°W

- Kenai, Alaska; United States
- Broadcast area: Kenai, Alaska
- Frequency: 91.9 MHz (HD Radio)
- Branding: 91.9FM Kenai and Soldotna

Programming
- Format: Public radio

Ownership
- Owner: Pickle Hill Public Broadcasting, Inc.
- Sister stations: KBBI

History
- Call sign meaning: KDLL = "dill" (an ingredient used for pickling)

Technical information
- Licensing authority: FCC
- Facility ID: 52538
- Class: A
- ERP: 4,900 watts
- HAAT: 22 meters (72 ft)

Links
- Public license information: Public file; LMS
- Website: www.kdll.org

KDLL is a non-commercial radio station in Kenai, Alaska, broadcasting on 91.9 FM. The station airs public radio programming from the National Public Radio network and the BBC World Service. KDLL also airs some locally originated programming.
