= KPEN-FM =

Radio station in Soldotna, Alaska

Coordinates: 60.511°N 151.272°W

- Soldotna, Alaska; United States
- Broadcast area: Kenai, Alaska
- Frequency: 101.7 (MHz)
- Branding: CHET FM, Coastal Country

Programming
- Format: Country

Ownership
- Owner: Peninsula Radio Group, Inc.
- Sister stations: KGTL, KWVV, KXBA, KPEN-AM

History
- First air date: 1985

Technical information
- Licensing authority: FCC
- Facility ID: 52149
- Class: C3
- ERP: 25,000 watts
- HAAT: 73 meters (240 ft)
- Translators: K257DB (99.3 MHz, Anchor Point, etc.); K257ER (99.3 MHz, Kenai); K265EX (100.9 MHz, Soldotna); K270CH (101.9 MHz, Homer); K271BF (102.1 MHz, Unalaska); K274AB (102.7 MHz, Kodiak); K274BO (102.7 MHz, Kachemak City; K287CD (105.3 MHz, Seward-Woodrow

Links
- Public license information: Public file; LMS
- Website: https://kpenfm.com

KPEN-FM is a commercial radio station in Soldotna, Alaska, broadcasting to the Kenai, Alaska, area on 101.7 FM.

KPEN-FM airs a country music format.

The station, and its sister stations, were purchased in November of 2024 from Peninsula Communications Inc, by Peninsula Radio Group Inc.

KPEN-FM was originally a San Francisco radio station which began broadcasting on October 27, 1957. Following a series of tests, the Federal Communications Commission (FCC) authorized KPEN to become the first station west of the Mississippi River to transmit in multiplex stereo, August 10, 1961. The station was later sold and became known as KIOI.

Another SF Bay Area station, originally known as KPGM, adopted the KPEN call letters in December 1969, one month after they became available. That station, located in Los Altos, CA, broadcasting on 97.7 FM, was not related to the San Francisco station. It had broadcast studios at the San Antonio center with transmitters west of El Monte avenue in Santa Clara county California in 1975 they moved out of the San Antonio center to the (now defunct) Old Mill Mall in Mountain View, CA.
