= KYSC =

Classic rock radio station in Fairbanks, Alaska, United States

Coordinates: 64.879°N 148.056°W

- Fairbanks, Alaska; United States
- Broadcast area: Fairbanks, Alaska
- Frequency: 96.9 MHz
- Branding: 96.9 The River

Programming
- Format: Classic rock

Ownership
- Owner: Rob Ingstad Licenses, LLC
- Sister stations: KDJF

History
- First air date: 2001
- Call sign meaning: KYSC-FM (sound-alike of former KISS-FM branding)

Technical information
- Licensing authority: FCC
- Facility ID: 77906
- Class: C1
- ERP: 5,800 watts
- HAAT: 490 meters

Links
- Public license information: Public file; LMS
- Webcast: Listen live
- Website: 969theriver.com

KYSC (96.9 FM) is a commercial classic rock music radio station in Fairbanks, Alaska.

KYSC was the commercial flagship station of University of Alaska Nanooks hockey before losing their rights to KSUA prior to the start of the 2008–2009 season.
