= KVNT =

Radio station in Eagle River, Alaska

Coordinates: 61°29′05″N 149°45′58″W

- Eagle River, Alaska; United States
- Broadcast area: Anchorage metropolitan area
- Frequency: 1020 kHz
- Branding: Valley News Talk 1020

Programming
- Format: Talk radio
- Affiliations: Compass Media Networks; Salem Radio Network; Townhall News; Westwood One

Ownership
- Owner: CBI Media Group; (Christian Broadcasting, Inc.)
- Sister stations: KAFC, KATB, KCFT-CD

History
- First air date: March 1986
- Former call signs: KCFA (1985–1992); KFFR (1992–1997); KAXX (1997–2008); KABA (2008–2009); KOAN (2009–2013)
- Call sign meaning: Valley News Talk

Technical information
- Licensing authority: FCC
- Facility ID: 53491
- Class: A
- Power: 10,000 watts
- Translators: 92.5 K223BJ (Eagle River); 104.5 K283AZ (Anchorage); 105.3 K287CL (Eagle River)

Links
- Public license information: Public file; LMS
- Webcast: Listen Live
- Website: cbimediagroup.com

KVNT (1020 AM) is a commercial radio station licensed to Eagle River, Alaska, United States, and broadcasting to the Anchorage metropolitan area. It airs a talk radio format and is owned by CBI Media Group. Its studios are located on Business Park Boulevard in Anchorage.

KVNT's transmitter is sited on Hazel Avenue in Wasilla. Programming is also heard on three low-power FM translators: 92.5 MHz, 104.5 MHz and 105.3 MHz.

== History ==
=== KCFA and KAXX ===
The station signed on the air in March 1986. Its original call sign was KCFA. It was powered at 10,000 watts by day but had to drop its power at sunset to 2,500 watts to avoid interference to 50,000-watt clear channel station KDKA in Pittsburgh. (Today, both KDKA and KVNT are Class A stations and KVNT no longer must reduce its power at night.)

In its early years, KCFA was a Christian radio station, broadcasting talk and teaching shows from noted Christian leaders. In 1997, the call letters switched to KAXX. It was a simulcast of KLEF 98.1 FM until February 12, 2007.

In 2007, KAXX's owner died. The FCC granted the estate of the licensee permission to remain silent for 6 months. It received a special temporary authority (STA) to stay off the air. KAXX needed to work out the details of transferring the license to another party. . If the station stayed silent for a period of 12 months, the license was to expire as a matter of law.

=== KABA and KOAN ===
KAXX returned to the air January 19, 2008. The station then began airing a business news format. KAXX changed its call letters to KABA on March 28, 2008. The license was transferred to Alaska Integrated Media of Anchorage, Alaska.

The station once again went dark for several months on September 15, 2008. This time it was due to transmitter failure. The station changed its call letters to KOAN on June 9, 2009. The KOAN call letters were previously used on channel 6 in Anchorage (a low-power station operating as an 87.7 FM station), which took the KABA call letters and business format.

=== KVNT ===
KOAN returned to the airwaves in December 2010 under the moniker FOX News Talk 1020. The station used a mix of local talent from former progressive talk sister station KUDO and Fox News Talk personalities in other dayparts.

Former logo

On November 20, 2013, KOAN changed its call letters to KVNT and rebranded as Valley News Talk 1020. It dropped its affiliation with Fox and began airing programs from the Salem Radio Network and Westwood One. It also began carrying news from Townhall, owned by Salem Media.

== Programming ==
Tom Anderson hosts the station's local morning show; the rest of the schedule is nationally syndicated conservative talk shows.
