= KUCB (FM) =

Radio station in Unalaska, Alaska

- Unalaska, Alaska; United States
- Broadcast area: Alaska Bush
- Frequency: 89.7 MHz (HD Radio)
- Branding: KUCB

Programming
- Format: Variety

Ownership
- Owner: Unalaska Community Broadcasting, Inc.

Technical information
- Licensing authority: FCC
- Facility ID: 171909
- Class: A
- ERP: 660 watts
- HAAT: −94 meters (−308 ft)
- Transmitter coordinates: 53°52′31.7″N 166°32′31.9″W

Links
- Public license information: Public file; LMS
- Website: kucb.org

Television station
- KUCB-LD

Dutch Harbor, Alaska; United States
- Channels: Digital: 8 (VHF); Virtual: 8

Ownership
- Owner: Unalaska Community Broadcasting, Inc.

History
- First air date: 1977
- Former call signs: K08IW (1977–2005); KIAL-LP (2005–2008); KUCB-LP (2008–2022)
- Former channel numbers: Analog: 8 (VHF, 1977–2021)

Technical information
- Facility ID: 68756
- ERP: 7 watts
- HAAT: −81 meters (−266 ft)
- Transmitter coordinates: 53°52′31.7″N 166°32′31.9″W

Links
- Public license information: LMS

KUCB is a non-commercial radio station in Unalaska, Alaska, broadcasting on 89.7 FM. It signed on in October 2008 to replace KIAL 1450 AM. KUCB generally broadcasts local programming, plus programming from National Public Radio, Native Voice One and Alaska Public Radio. The KIAL radio and television stations were formerly owned by the municipality of Unalaska; due to municipal cutbacks they now operate as an independent non-profit organization dependent largely on individual donors. Shortly after its sell-off, KIAL, which only broadcast at 50 watts, moved to the FM dial as KUCB, with a stronger signal.

== Television ==
KUCB also operates KUCB-LD, a 7-watt low-power television station on channel 8 in Dutch Harbor, Alaska. The majority of the channel's schedule consists of a community bulletin board, although several hours of locally produced programs are also shown. While some sources identify the station as K08IW, FCC records indicate that a station with these calls became KIAL-LP on August 5, 2005, with KUCB-LP assigned on August 15, 2008. As of 2022, the station was silent.
