= KBBI =

Coordinates: 59°40′11.8″N 151°26′45.7″W

- Homer, Alaska; United States
- Frequency: 890 kHz (HD Radio)

Programming
- Format: Public radio
- Affiliations: National Public Radio

Ownership
- Owner: Kachemak Bay Broadcasting Inc.
- Sister stations: KDLL

History
- First air date: 1981
- Former frequencies: 1250 kHz
- Call sign meaning: Kachemak Bay Broadcasting, Inc.

Technical information
- Licensing authority: FCC
- Facility ID: 33256
- Class: A
- Power: 10,000 watts unlimited

Links
- Public license information: Public file; LMS
- Website: www.kbbi.org

KBBI (890 AM) is a National Public Radio member radio station in Homer, Alaska. KBBI is a Class A, clear-channel station which broadcasts with a power of 10,000 watts.
