= KBBO-FM =

Radio station in Houston–Anchorage, Alaska

Coordinates: 61.336°N 149.516°W

- Houston, Alaska; United States
- Broadcast area: Anchorage, Alaska
- Frequency: 92.1 MHz
- Branding: 92.1 Bob FM

Programming
- Format: Variety hits

Ownership
- Owner: Ohana Media Group; (OMG FCC Licenses LLC)
- Sister stations: KRAK; KFAT; KXLW

History
- First air date: 1997 (as KQEZ)
- Former call signs: KCYT (1996–1997); KQEZ (1997–2005)
- Call sign meaning: "Bob"

Technical information
- Licensing authority: FCC
- Facility ID: 68694
- Class: C2
- ERP: 10,000 watts
- HAAT: 270 meters (890 ft)

Links
- Public license information: Public file; LMS
- Webcast: Listen live
- Website: 921bob.com

KBBO-FM (92.1 MHz, "Bob FM") is a commercial variety hits music radio station in Houston, Alaska, broadcasting to the Anchorage, Alaska, area. It is owned by Ohana Media. Its studios are located in Downtown Anchorage and its transmitter is in Eagle River, Alaska.
