= KAFC =

Radio station in Anchorage, Alaska

Coordinates: 61.067°N 149.746°W

Anchorage, Alaska; United States
- Broadcast area: Anchorage metropolitan area
- Frequency: 93.7 MHz
- Branding: 93.7 KAFC

Programming
- Language: English
- Format: Christian adult contemporary

Ownership
- Owner: CBI Media Group; (Christian Broadcasting, Inc.)
- Sister stations: KATB; KVNT; KCFT-CD

Technical information
- Licensing authority: FCC
- Facility ID: 78507
- Class: C2
- ERP: 27,000 watts
- HAAT: 202 meters

Links
- Public license information: Public file; LMS
- Webcast: Listen Live
- Website: kafc.org

KAFC (93.7 FM, "93.7 KAFC") is a commercial radio station in Anchorage, Alaska, United States. Its format is Christian adult contemporary music, and its studios are located on Northern Lights Boulevard at Boniface Parkway in Anchorage, and its transmitter is in the Bayshore district.

Logo under previous slogan
