= KAGV =

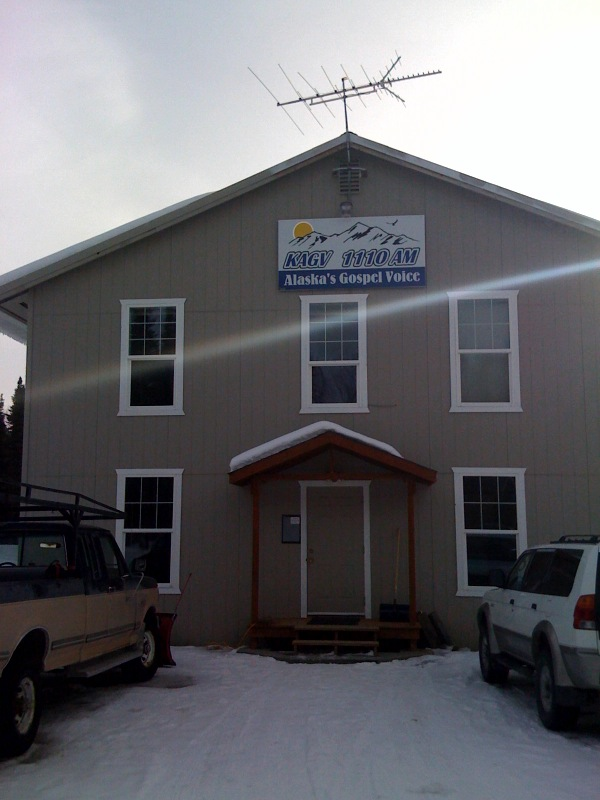
- KAGV studios in March 2009
- Big Lake, Alaska; United States
- Broadcast area: Matanuska Valley
- Frequency: 1110 kHz

Programming
- Format: Religious

Ownership
- Owner: Voice For Christ Ministries, Inc.

History
- First air date: January 30, 2002
- Call sign meaning: Alaska's Gospel Voice

Technical information
- Licensing authority: FCC
- Facility ID: 129316
- Class: B
- Power: 10,000 watts
- Transmitter coordinates: 61°38′1.1″N 149°47′44″W

Links
- Public license information: Public file; LMS
- Webcast: Listen Online
- Website: KAGV Online

KAGV (1110 AM) is a radio station licensed to serve Big Lake, Alaska, United States. The station is owned by Voice For Christ Ministries, Inc. It airs a religious radio format.

The station was assigned these call letters by the Federal Communications Commission on January 30, 2002.
