= KICY-FM =

Coordinates: 64.502°N 165.413°W

- Nome, Alaska; United States
- Broadcast area: Alaska Bush
- Frequency: 100.3 MHz
- Branding: Icy 100.3

Programming
- Format: Christian Contemporary

Ownership
- Owner: Arctic Broadcasting Association

History
- First air date: 1977

Technical information
- Licensing authority: FCC
- Facility ID: 2677
- Class: A
- ERP: 1,000 watts
- HAAT: -110 meters

Links
- Public license information: Public file; LMS
- Webcast: Listen Live
- Website: KICY-FM website

KICY-FM is a commercial Christian contemporary music radio station in Nome, Alaska, broadcasting on 100.3 FM.
