= KYKD =

Coordinates: 60.805°N 161.790°W

- Bethel, Alaska; United States
- Broadcast area: Alaska Bush
- Frequency: 100.1 MHz
- Branding: Giving the Winds a Mighty Voice

Programming
- Format: Religious

Ownership
- Owner: Voice for Christ Ministries

Technical information
- Licensing authority: FCC
- Class: C3
- ERP: 12,000 watts horizontal
- HAAT: 22 meters
- Translator: see below

Links
- Public license information: Public file; LMS
- Webcast: Listen Live
- Website: KYKD website

KYKD (100.1 FM) is a non-profit radio station airing a Christian radio format in Bethel, Alaska. The station is owned by Voice for Christ Ministries.

== Translators ==
In addition to the main station, KYKD is relayed by an additional 6 translators to widen its broadcast area.

Broadcast translators for KYKD
Call sign	Frequency	City of license	FID	ERP (W)	Class	FCC info
K232ER	94.3 FM	Aniak, Alaska	138978	250	D	LMS
K232DV	94.3 FM	Ambler, Alaska	139014	250	D	LMS
K229CV	93.7 FM	Upper Kalskag, Alaska	139013	250	D	LMS
K232DS	94.3 FM	Hooper Bay, Alaska	139028	250	D	LMS
K232DW	94.3 FM	Quinhagak, Alaska	139020	250	D	LMS
K232FQ	94.3 FM	Togiak, Alaska	10823	380	D	LMS

KYKD also provides programming to KSCM in Scammon Bay, owned by VisionAlaska, a non-profit organization who operates the station in partnership with Voice for Christ Ministries and the Scammon Bay Evangelical Covenant Church.
