= KJNP-FM =

Radio station in North Pole–Fairbanks, Alaska

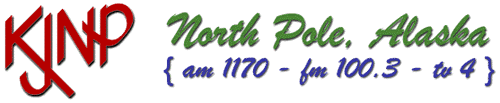
- North Pole, Alaska; United States
- Broadcast area: Greater Fairbanks, Alaska, area
- Frequency: 100.3 MHz

Programming
- Format: Religious

Ownership
- Owner: Evangelistic Alaska Missionary Fellowship, Inc.
- Sister stations: KJNP (AM)

History
- First air date: 1981
- Call sign meaning: King Jesus North Pole

Technical information
- Licensing authority: FCC
- Facility ID: 20016
- Class: C1
- ERP: 25,000 watts
- HAAT: 479 meters (1572 feet)
- Transmitter coordinates: 64°52′44″N 148°03′10″W

Links
- Public license information: Public file; LMS
- Website: KJNP-FM Online

KJNP-FM (100.3 FM) is a radio station licensed to serve North Pole, Alaska. The station is owned by Evangelistic Alaska Missionary Fellowship. It airs a Religious radio format.

KJNP-FM was founded by Don & Gen Nelson. The station was assigned the KJNP-FM call letters by the Federal Communications Commission on January 26, 1981.

== Translators ==
Broadcast translator for KJNP-FM
| Call sign | Frequency | City of license | FID | ERP (W) | Class | FCC info |
|---|---|---|---|---|---|---|
| K285AL | 104.9 FM | Fort Yukon, Alaska | 20017 | 4 | D | LMS |
