= Houston, Alaska =

City in Alaska, United States

Houston
- City
- Flag

- Location in Matanuska-Susitna Borough and the state of Alaska

- Location in Alaska
- Coordinates: 61°36′30″N 149°46′25″W
- Country: United States
- State: Alaska
- Borough: Matanuska-Susitna
- Incorporated: June 6, 1966

Government
  - Mayor: Carter Cole
  - State senator: Mike Shower (R)
  - State rep.: Kevin McCabe (R)

Area
  - Total: 25.25 sq mi (65.41 km^{2})
  - Land: 23.94 sq mi (62.01 km^{2})
  - Water: 1.32 sq mi (3.41 km^{2})
- Elevation: 249 ft (76 m)

Population (2020)
  - Total: 1,975
  - Estimate (2022): 2,100
  - Density: 82.5/sq mi (31.85/km^{2})
- Time zone: UTC-9 (Alaska (AKST))
  - Summer (DST): UTC-8 (AKDT)
- ZIP code: 99694
- Area code: 907
- FIPS code: 02-33800
- GNIS feature ID: 1416613
- Website: www.houstonak.us

Houston is a city in Matanuska-Susitna Borough, Alaska, United States. It is part of the Anchorage, Alaska Metropolitan Statistical Area. It is located roughly 33 miles from downtown Anchorage, though it is a 57-mile drive between the two points. The population was 1,975 at the 2020 census, up from 1,912 in 2000.

== Geography ==
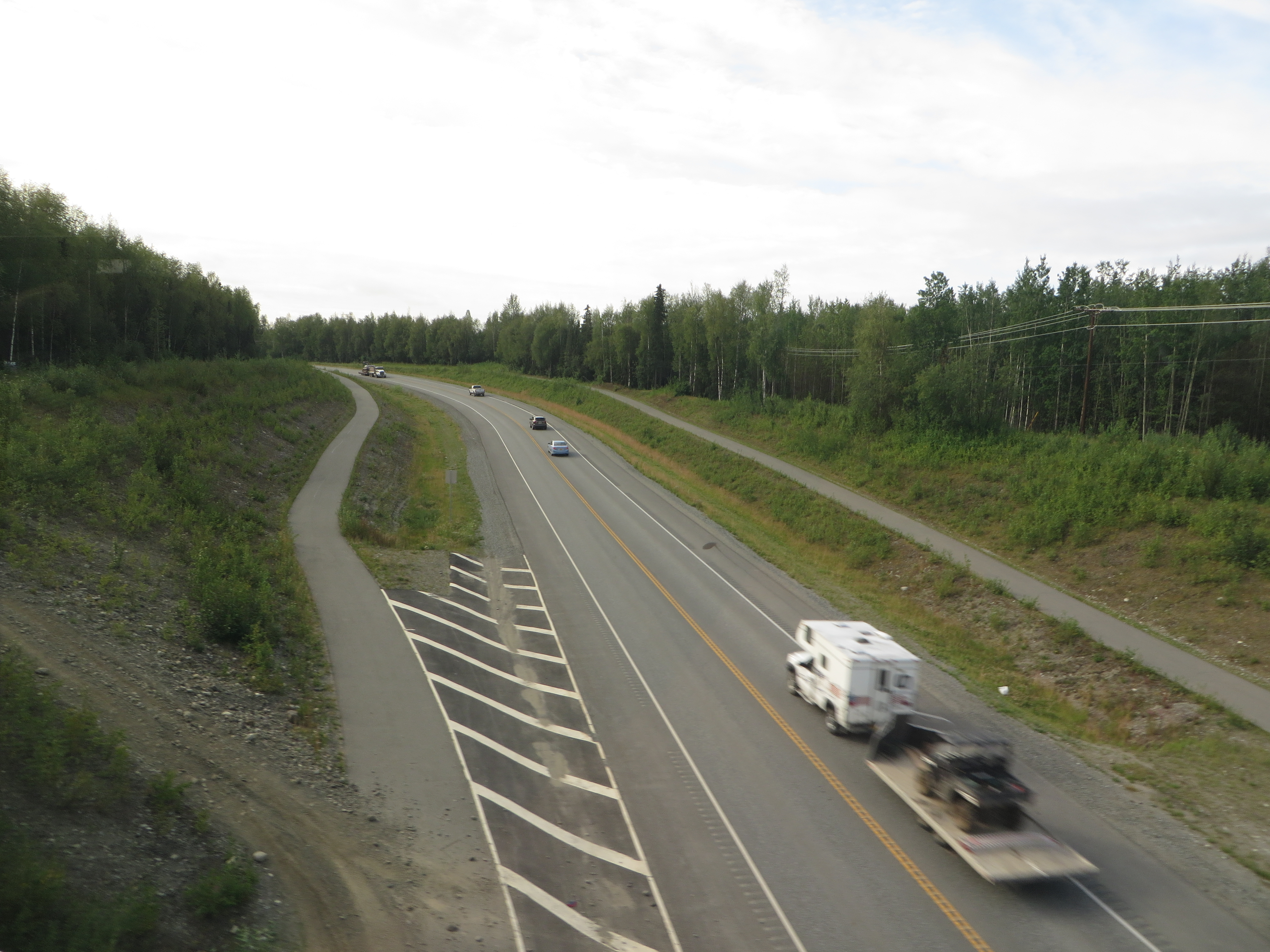
View from aboard an Alaska Railroad train, looking at the George Parks Highway near its crossing of the Little Susitna River

Houston is located at 61°36′30″N 149°46′25″W (61.608309, -149.773719). This places it along the George Parks Highway and the Little Susitna River.

According to the United States Census Bureau, the city has a total area of 23.9 square miles (62 km^{2}), of which, 22.4 square miles (58 km^{2}) of it is land and 1.1 square miles (2.8 km^{2}) of it (4.89%) is water.

== Demographics ==
Historical population
Census	Pop.	Note	%±
1970	69		—
1980	370		436.2%
1990	697		88.4%
2000	1,202		72.5%
2010	1,912		59.1%
2020	1,975		3.3%
U.S. Decennial Census

=== 2020 census ===
As of the 2020 census, Houston had a population of 1,975. The median age was 40.2 years; 24.9% of residents were under the age of 18 and 13.3% were 65 years of age or older. For every 100 females there were 115.8 males, and for every 100 females age 18 and over there were 114.0 males age 18 and over.

0.0% of residents lived in urban areas, while 100.0% lived in rural areas.

There were 798 households in Houston, of which 31.3% had children under the age of 18 living in them. Of all households, 41.9% were married-couple households, 26.6% were households with a male householder and no spouse or partner present, and 19.8% were households with a female householder and no spouse or partner present. About 28.9% of all households were made up of individuals and 10.3% had someone living alone who was 65 years of age or older.

There were 1,030 housing units, of which 22.5% were vacant. The homeowner vacancy rate was 5.1% and the rental vacancy rate was 8.5%.

Racial composition as of the 2020 census
Race	Number	Percent
White	1,622	82.1%
Black or African American	6	0.3%
American Indian and Alaska Native	117	5.9%
Asian	20	1.0%
Native Hawaiian and Other Pacific Islander	6	0.3%
Some other race	10	0.5%
Two or more races	194	9.8%
Hispanic or Latino (of any race)	41	2.1%

=== 2022 American Community Survey ===
According to the 2022 American Community Survey, the median income for a household in the city was $53,750, and the median income for a family was $75,096. Males had a median income of $40,417 versus $28,207 for females. The per capita income for the city was $35,792. About 20% of the population fell below the poverty line, including 33.3% of those under age 18 and 10.1% of those age 65 or over.

14% of residents were veterans, compared to 10.1% of Alaska's population as a whole and 6.2% of Americans more generally.

== History ==
Houston Siding was first listed on a blueprint map of the Alaska Railroad in 1917 as part of the growing mining operations in the area. It was heavily used by the U.S. Navy during World War II, after which the mines were abandoned.

Houston was incorporated as a third-class city in 1966, and later re-designated as a second-class city in 1973.

Other notable events in the city's history include:

- On August 30, 1972, George Boney, the chief justice of the Alaska Supreme Court and at the time the youngest chief justice of any U.S. state supreme court, died in Houston (at Cheri Lake) in a boating accident which resulted in drowning.
- On June 3, 1996, the Miller's Reach wildfire covered more than 37,000 acres (14,973 ha) in Houston and adjacent Big Lake. Property loss included 454 buildings; it cost over $16 million.

== Legal firework sales ==
Houston, Alaska is home to the Gorilla Fireworks Stand along its Parks Highway, providing a wide range of pyrotechnic explosions and products to the public. The city allows the sale of fireworks, which are prohibited throughout the Mat-Su Borough and Anchorage, and the sales taxes generated from those help pay for emergency services. These stands are the only place to purchase fireworks legally in Southcentral Alaska, and provide entertainment to many residents and visitors of the state. Taxes from fireworks sales at Houston's parks highway stands cover 10-15% of the city fire department's budget.

Fireworks buyers are charged a 2% sales tax, plus an additional 2% tax. This policy was approved by the voters of Houston in 2010, and was made permanent by the City Council. The additional tax was meant to “promote increased public safety”, and all the tax take goes to the fire department.

== Cannabis legalization ==
In 2014, Alaska voters approved the legalization of recreational marijuana and its retail sale. However, local governments were given the right to ban commercial grow operations or pot sales within city limits. While Palmer and Wasilla originally banned marijuana sales and grow operations, Houston attempted to bolster its city revenues by allowing marijuana commerce. The mayor of Houston, Virgie Thompson, believed that cannabis excise and sales taxes could cover expenses for a new city police force.

Houston issued the first limited grow room license in the Matsu Valley to Lacey and Ron Bass in 2016. In 2021, marijuana tax revenue alone comprised over 33% of Houston's total collected taxes.

== Notable person ==
- James Bondsteel (1947–1987), Medal of Honor recipient, lived in Houston until his death in 1987

== See also ==
- List of cities in Alaska
