= KRFF (FM) =

- Fairbanks, Alaska; United States
- Frequency: 89.1 MHz
- Branding: Voice of Denali

Programming
- Format: Native American music Americana music

Ownership
- Owner: Athabascan Fiddlers Association, Inc.

History
- First air date: February 28, 2014

Technical information
- Licensing authority: FCC
- Facility ID: 173890
- Class: C1
- ERP: 10,000 watts
- HAAT: 474 meters (1,555 ft)
- Transmitter coordinates: 64°52′45″N 148°3′10″W

Links
- Public license information: Public file; LMS
- Webcast: Listen live
- Website: krff891.com

KRFF (89.1 FM) is a non-commercial radio station licensed to Fairbanks, Alaska. Broadcasting at 10,000 watts effective radiated power, the station's format consists of Native American music and Americana music. KRFF is owned by Athabascan Fiddlers Association, Inc.

== Repeaters ==
Call sign	Frequency	City of license	FID	ERP (W)	HAAT	Class	FCC info
KRLL-FM	93.9 FM	Circle, Alaska	203344	85	−26.5 m (−87 ft)	D	LMS
KNNA-FM	99.1 FM	Nenana, Alaska	199589	1	259.7 m (852 ft)	D	LMS
KTKF	89.5 FM	Tok, Alaska	198722	85	−11.4 m (−37 ft)	D	LMS
