= KKNI-FM =

Coordinates: 60.4881°N 150.7474°W

- Sterling, Alaska; United States
- Broadcast area: South Central Alaska
- Frequency: 105.3 MHz

Programming
- Format: Classic hits

Ownership
- Owner: Matt Wilson; (KSRM Radio Group, Inc.)
- Sister stations: KFSE, KKIS-FM, KSLD, KSRM, KWHQ-FM

History
- First air date: 1999 (as KPFN at 105.9)
- Former call signs: KPFN (1998–2006); KSWD-FM (2006–2008); KKNI (2008–2014)
- Former frequencies: 105.9 MHz (1999–2007)

Technical information
- Licensing authority: FCC
- Facility ID: 72677
- Class: C3
- ERP: 7,000 watts
- HAAT: 86.5 meters (284 ft)
- Translator: 95.7 K239AV (Sterling)

Links
- Public license information: Public file; LMS
- Webcast: Listen Live
- Website: KKNI-FM Online

KKNI-FM is a commercial classic hits music radio station in Sterling, Alaska, broadcasting on 105.3 FM. Previous call signs were KPFN and KSWD-FM with a frequency of 105.9, but in 2007, the station relocated to 105.3 and the KSWD-FM call sign was assigned to a Los Angeles, California station.

KKNI-FM is owned by Matt Wilson, through licensee KSRM Radio Group, Inc.
