= KMBQ-FM =

Radio station in Wasilla, Alaska

Coordinates: 61.642°N 149.441°W

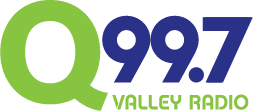
- Wasilla, Alaska; United States
- Broadcast area: Mat-Su Valley area
- Frequency: 99.7 MHz
- Branding: Q99.7

Programming
- Format: Modern adult contemporary

Ownership
- Owner: Ohana Media Group

History
- First air date: March 15, 1985 (as KNBZ)
- Former call signs: KNBZ (1984–1990)

Technical information
- Licensing authority: FCC
- Facility ID: 35118
- Class: C1
- ERP: 51,000 watts
- HAAT: -48 meters

Links
- Public license information: Public file; LMS
- Website: kmbq.com

KMBQ-FM (99.7 FM) is a radio station with studios located in Downtown Anchorage, broadcasting a modern adult contemporary format. Licensed to Wasilla, Alaska, United States, the station serves the Mat-Su Valley area. The station is currently owned by Seattle-based Ohana Media Group, and its transmitter is north of Wasilla.
