= AlaskaOne =

PBS member network in Alaska, United States

- Type: Non-commercial educational broadcast television network
- Country: United States
- TV stations: See § Stations
- Broadcast area: Statewide Alaska (except Anchorage)
- Owner: various, see table below
- Launch date: 1995; 31 years ago
- Dissolved: July 1, 2012; 14 years ago
- Affiliation: PBS
- Official website: www.alaskaone.org

AlaskaOne (or Alaska One) was a PBS member network of public television stations based in Fairbanks, Alaska, from 1995 to 2012. It served communities in Alaska outside Anchorage. It was operated by the University of Alaska Fairbanks.

It comprised five stations:

- KUAC-TV channel 9 (Fairbanks)
- KTOO-TV channel 3 (Juneau)
- KMXT-LP channel 9 (Kodiak)
- KYUK-LD channel 15 (Bethel)
- KIAL-LP/KUCB-LP channel 8 Unalaska (licensed station operated by KUCB radio) (Licensed in Dutch Harbor)

KUAC-TV was the flagship station. The other four stations were locally owned, and occasionally broke off from the main AlaskaOne feed to air local programming. KUAC's massive translator network in the Alaska Interior aired the full network schedule.

KYUK-TV originally aired on full-power channel 4 in Bethel starting in September 1972, introducing television to the area, broadcasting seven hours of programming a day, five days a week. Its founding general manager was Andy Edge; opening night featured participation of at least eight locals. Swanson's Department Store brought in a television set rush in its opening week (it was estimated that at least 100 such sets existed in Bethel and the surrounding area). It also had programs in Yupik from the beginning. It reportedly ceased operation and had its license deleted by the FCC on March 20, 2009. According to KYUK's website, in 2004 its signal was moved to low-power K15AV. However, it renamed the low-powered TV station as KYUK-LP (now KYUK-LD).

KUAC-TV signed on in 1971 as the first public television station in Alaska. KYUK followed in 1972, with KTOO coming online in 1978. The three stations merged into the AlaskaOne network in 1995.

Some AlaskaOne programs were also seen on Alaska's omnibus network, the Alaska Rural Communications Service, which is partially owned by AlaskaOne.

The organization also operates a radio network, which uses material from National Public Radio, American Public Media, Public Radio International, the Alaska Public Radio Network, and CoastAlaska.

In November 2011, AlaskaOne's corporate entity, Alaska Public Broadcasting Service, voted to transfer the network's operations from KUAC-TV to KAKM effective July 1, 2012. Claiming that this arrangement would do financial harm to KUAC, UAF announced on December 8 that KUAC-TV would leave AlaskaOne and revert to being a separate station at that time. On July 1, KUAC-TV officially relaunched as a separate station, while KTOO-TV and KYUK merged with KAKM to form Alaska Public Television.

== Stations ==
Station	City of license	Channels Virtual / Digital	Owner	First air date	Last air date	Call letters’ meaning	Sister station(s)	ERP (Digital)	HAAT (Digital)	Facility ID	Transmitter Coordinates	Website
KUAC-TV	Fairbanks	9 / 9 (VHF)	University of Alaska	December 22, 1971 (54 years ago)	N/A	University of Alaska; College	KUAC-FM	30 kW	168.9 m	69315	64°54′40.3″N 147°46′47.5″W	www.kuac.org
KTOO-TV	Juneau	3 / 10 (VHF)	Capital Community Broadcasting, Inc.	October 1, 1978 (47 years ago)	N/A	N/A	KTOO	1 kW	-363 m	8651	58°18′4.8″N 134°25′13.6″W	www.ktoo.org

KUCB-LP, channel 8, is a low-powered station operating at 10 watts. Further information about the station is unavailable.
