= Corey Flintoff =

American journalist

Corey Flintoff (born April 8, 1946) is a retired journalist. Among his positions was international correspondent based in Moscow for National Public Radio (NPR) for four years.

== Early life and education ==
Flintoff was born in Fairbanks, Alaska.

He earned a bachelor's degree from University of California at Berkeley and a master's degree from University of Chicago (where one of his professors was Norman Maclean).

== Career ==
Flintoff's broadcasting career began in Bethel, Alaska, at the bilingual (English-Yup'ik Eskimo) station KYUK. He spent many years as a newscaster and reporter at the Alaska Public Radio Network before joining NPR in 1990, where he was a newscaster.

In 2007, Flintoff was included in a report compiled by MSNBC of journalists who had made campaign contributions to political candidates. A 2003 contribution of $538 to Howard Dean made their list. Flintoff insists that his wife made the contribution from a joint account. In spite of the error, Flintoff stated that it led to policy reforms at NPR.

Flintoff retired in October 2016.

== Personal life ==
Corey Flintoff is married to Diana Derby. They have a daughter, Claire Flintoff.
