= KAKM =

Television station in Anchorage, Alaska

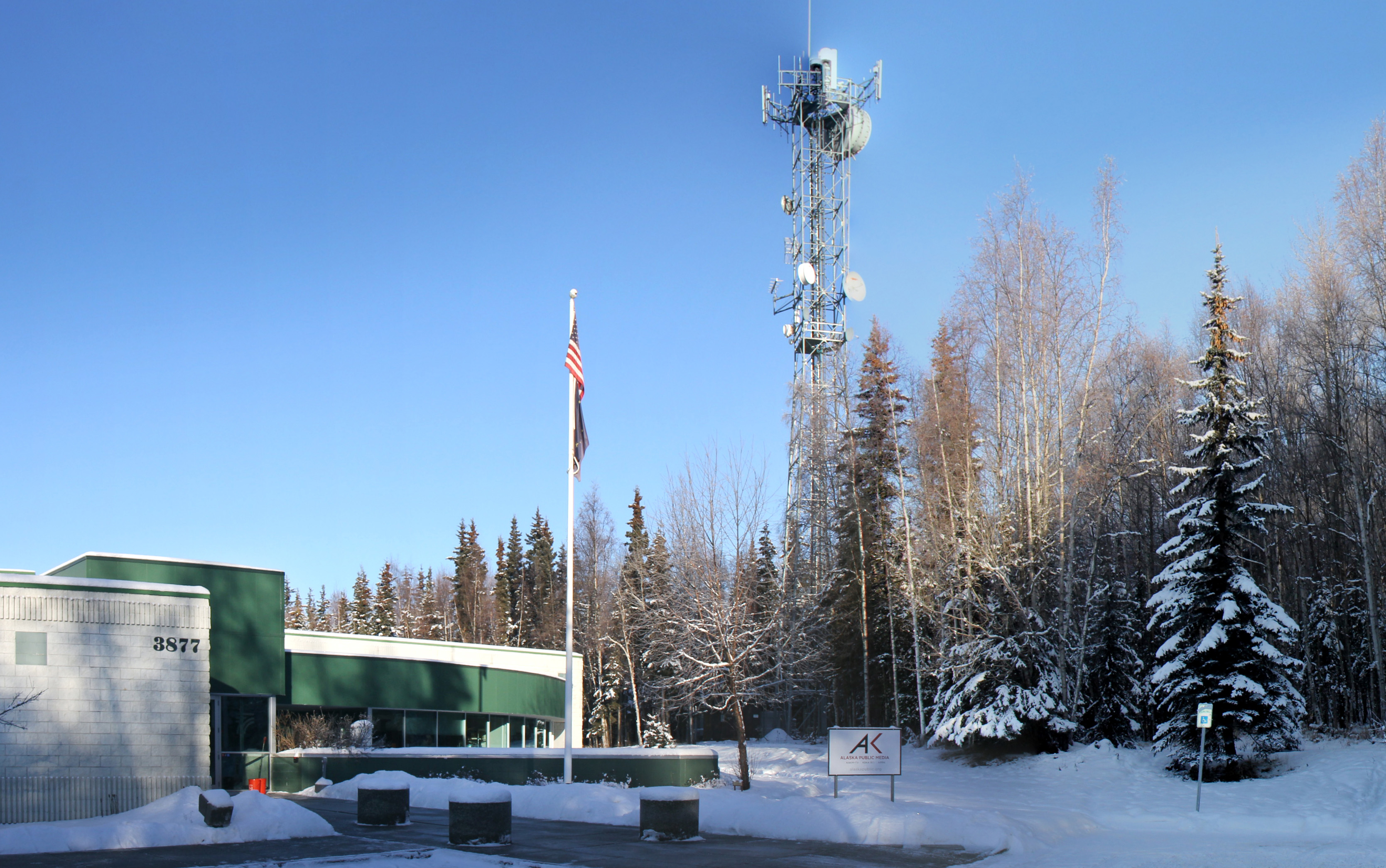
- Anchorage, Alaska; United States
- Channels: Digital: 8 (VHF); Virtual: 7
- Branding: Alaska Public Media

Programming
- Affiliations: 7.1: PBS; for others, see § KAKM subchannels

Ownership
- Owner: Alaska Public Media; (Alaska Public Telecommunications, Inc.)
- Sister stations: KTVA, KSKA

History
- First air date: May 7, 1975
- Former channel numbers: Analog: 7 (VHF, 1975–2009)
- Call sign meaning: Anchorage, Kenai, Matanuska

Technical information
- Licensing authority: FCC
- Facility ID: 804
- ERP: 50 kW
- HAAT: 240 m (787 ft)
- Transmitter coordinates: 61°25′19.8″N 149°52′27.8″W
- Translator(s): see § KAKM translators

Links
- Public license information: Public file; LMS
- Website: www.alaskapublic.org

KTOO-TV
Satellite of KAKM
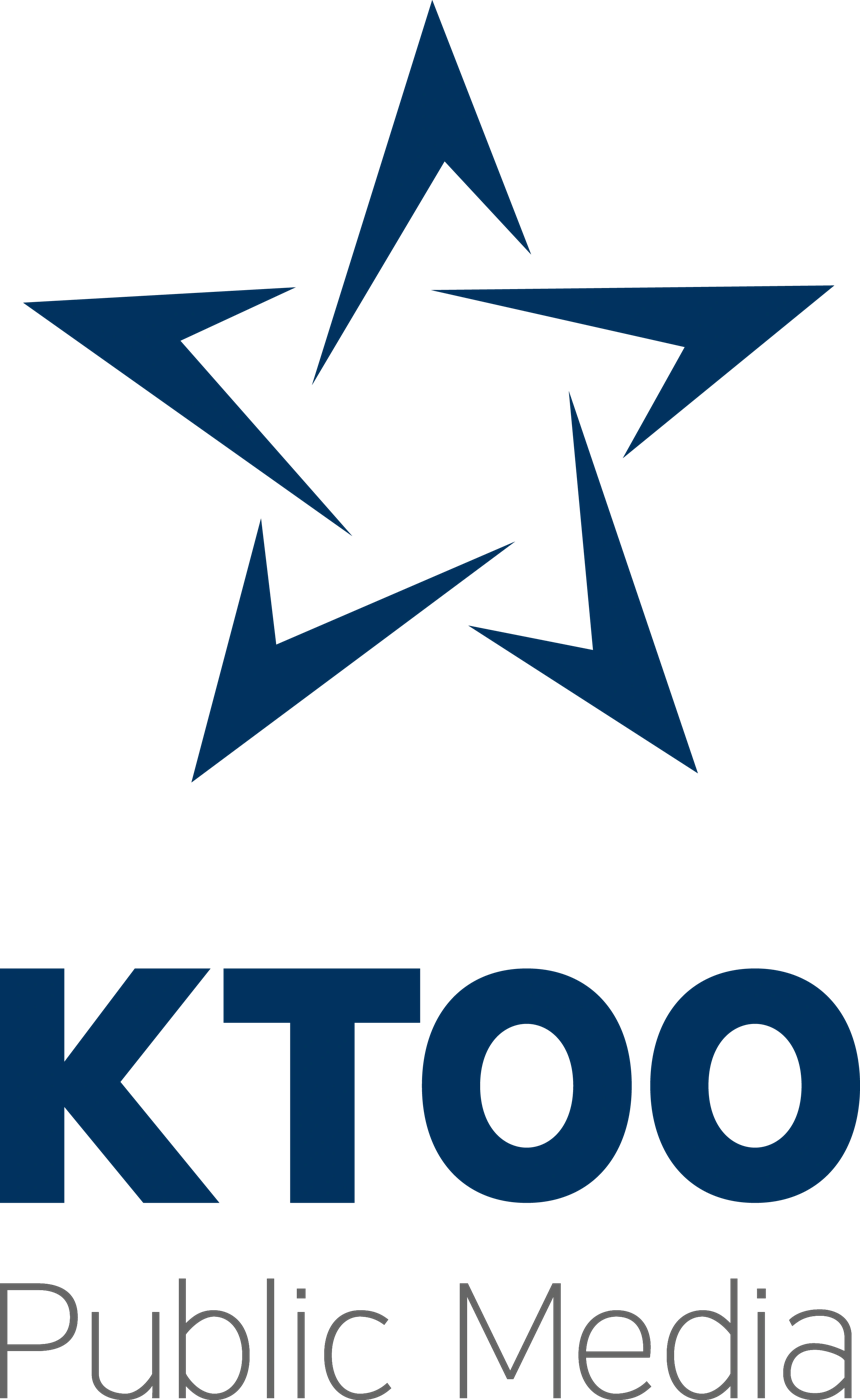
- Juneau, Alaska
- Channels: Digital: 10 (VHF); Virtual: 3

Programming
- Affiliations: 3.1: PBS; for others, see § KTOO-TV subchannels

Ownership
- Owner: KTOO Public Media
- Sister stations: KTOO, KNLL, KRNN

History
- First air date: October 1, 1978
- Former channel numbers: Analog: 3 (VHF, 1978–2009)
- Call sign meaning: The word "Too"

Technical information
- Licensing authority: FCC
- Facility ID: 8651
- ERP: 1 kW
- HAAT: −363.7 m (−1,193 ft)
- Transmitter coordinates: 58°18′4.8″N 134°25′13.6″W

Links
- Public license information: Public file; LMS
- Website: ktoo.org

KYUK-LD
Translator of KAKM
- Bethel, Alaska
- Channels: Digital: 15 (UHF); Virtual: 15
- Branding: KYUK-TV 15

Programming
- Affiliations: 15.1: PBS; 15.2: ARCS; 15.3: 360 North

Ownership
- Owner: Bethel Broadcasting, Incorporated
- Operator: Alaska Public Media
- Sister stations: KYUK-FM

History
- First air date: September 18, 1981
- Former call signs: K02KU (1981–1985); K15AV (1985–2012); K15AV-D (2012)
- Call sign meaning: Yukon-Kuskokwim Delta

Technical information
- Licensing authority: FCC
- Facility ID: 62614
- Class: LD
- ERP: 100 W
- HAAT: 46.51 m (153 ft)
- Transmitter coordinates: 60°47′30.3″N 161°46′30.3″W

Links
- Public license information: LMS
- Website: kyuk.org

KAKM (channel 7) is a PBS member television station in Anchorage, Alaska, United States. Owned by Alaska Public Media, it is sister to NPR member KSKA (91.1 FM). The two stations share studios at the Elmo Sackett Broadcast Center on the campus of Alaska Pacific University on University Drive in Anchorage; KAKM's transmitter is located near Knik, Alaska.

KAKM was the only PBS station in Alaska that was not part of AlaskaOne during its existence. The call letters were chosen to represent the three major geographic areas served by the station: Anchorage, Kenai, and Matanuska.

KAKM programming is available on partner station KTOO-TV (channel 3), licensed in the capital city of Juneau. This station is owned by KTOO Public Media as a sister to non-commercial FM radio stations KTOO, KXLL, and KRNN. KTOO's transmitter is located in downtown Juneau. KTOO was formerly part of AlaskaOne, until its dissolution in 2012.

KAKM is also relayed on low-power station KYUK-LD (channel 15) in Bethel, owned by Bethel Broadcasting, Incorporated as sister to radio stations KYUK (AM) and KYUK-FM.

== History ==
KAKM first started regular transmissions on May 7, 1975, at 7:07 p.m. Previously, PBS programming had been offered to Anchorage stations on a per-program basis: for example, Sesame Street was carried on KTVA (channel 11), Mister Rogers' Neighborhood on KIMO (channel 13, now KYUR) and The Electric Company on KENI-TV (channel 2, now KTUU-TV).

KAKM became the flagship station of Alaska Public Television, the successor to AlaskaOne, replacing KUAC-TV in Fairbanks, on July 1, 2012 (which became a standalone station again). As a result, KTOO-TV became a full-time satellite of KAKM. KYUK-LD also rebroadcasts KAKM, but it carries the Alaska Rural Communications Service on its second digital subchannel in place of Create.

== Station presentation ==
KAKM's former "Line 7" logo, in blue

KAKM's former "Line 7" logo, in mauve

KAKM's former "Line 7" logo, with sister station KSKA

== Technical information ==
The stations' signals are multiplexed:

=== KAKM subchannels ===
Subchannels of KAKM and KTVA
Channel		Res.	Short name	Programming
KAKM	KTVA	Res.	Short name	Programming
7.1	11.1	1080i	KAKM-HD	PBS
7.2	11.2	480i	Create	Create
7.3	11.3	480i	KTOO360	KTOO 360TV
7.4	11.4	1080i	24_7HD	PBS Kids

=== KTOO-TV subchannels ===
Subchannels of KTOO-TV
Channel	Res.	Short name	Programming
3.1	1080i	AK PBS	PBS (KAKM)
3.2	480i	Create	Create
3.3	1080i	KTOO360	KTOO 360TV
3.4	1080i	PBSKids	PBS Kids
3.5	480i	KTOO-FM	News/Talk/NPR
3.6	480i	KRNN-FM	Music
3.7	480i	KXLL-FM	Music

=== KYUK-LD subchannels ===
Subchannels of KYUK-LD
Channel	Res.	Short name	Programming
15.1	480i	AK PBS	PBS (4:3)
15.2	480i	ARCS	Alaska Rural Communications Service (4:3)
15.3	480i	KTOO360	KTOO 360TV (4:3)

KTOO 360TV provides statewide coverage of Alaska public affairs, documentaries, historical programs, and Native topics. Originating from the studios of KTOO-TV in Juneau, 360TV programming includes Gavel Alaska, which provides unedited live & recording broadcast TV and streaming coverage the Alaska Legislature.

=== Analog-to-digital conversion ===
KAKM and KTOO shut down their analog signals on June 12, 2009, the official date on which full-power television stations in the United States transitioned from analog to digital broadcasts under federal mandate:

- KAKM shut down its analog signal, over VHF channel 7; the station's digital signal remained on its pre-transition VHF channel 8, using virtual channel 7.
- KTOO shut down its analog signal, over VHF channel 3; the station's digital signal remained on its pre-transition VHF channel 10, using virtual channel 3.

=== Translators ===
KAKM and KTOO extend their over-the-air coverage through a network of translator stations.

==== KAKM translators ====
- Girdwood: K05FW-D
- Homer: K07PF-D
- Kasilof: K25PI-D
- Kenai: K12LA-D
- Ninilchik: K21AM-D
- Sitka: K09AAD-D
