= The Spirit of New Wine =

Documentary about wine

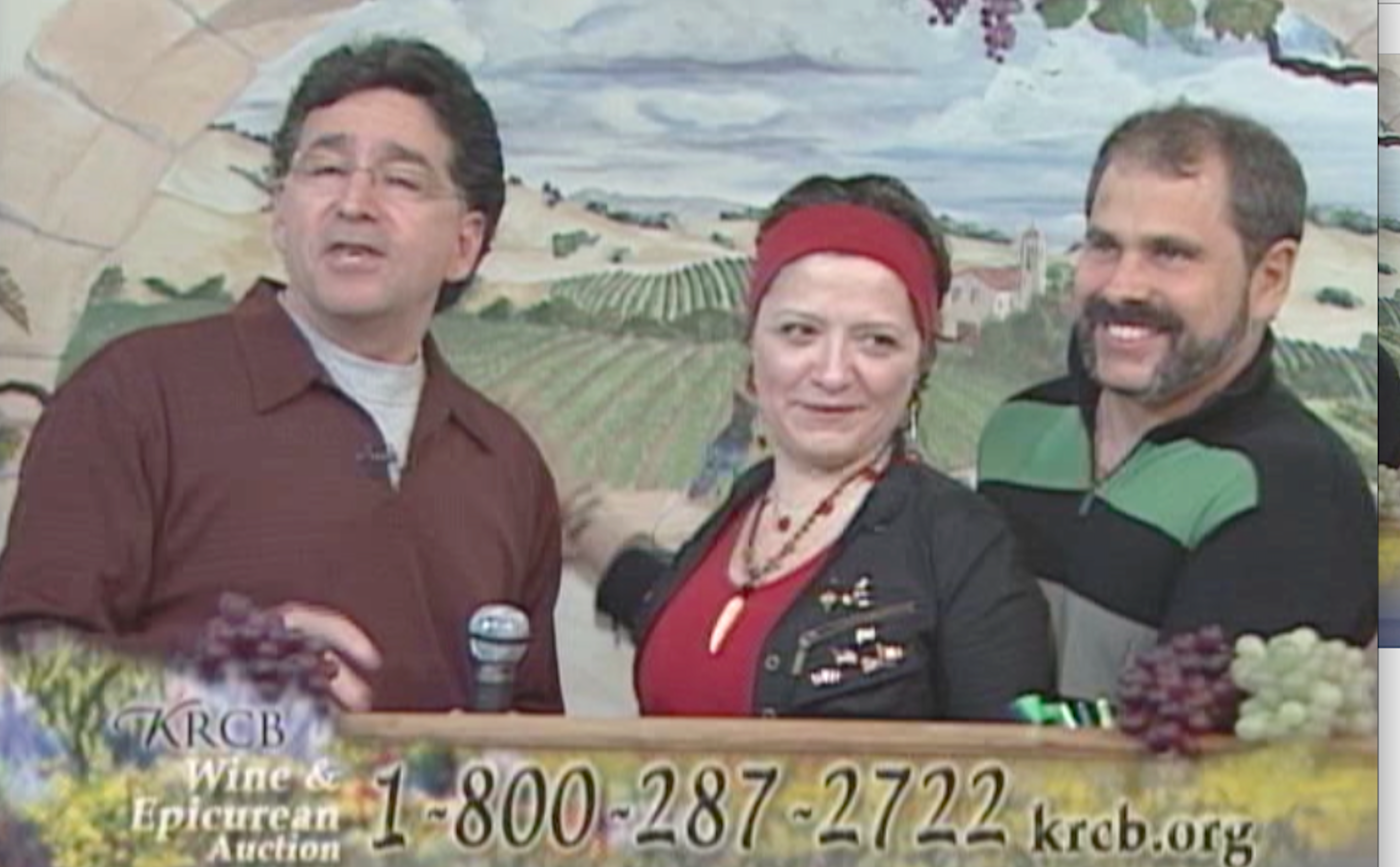
Denise and Thomas Brickel (middle and right) discuss THE SPIRIT OF NEW WINE on KRCB's annual wine auction in October 2008.

The Spirit of New Wine is a documentary about the cultural and spiritual connotations of wine, with a special focus on wine's connection to cuisine, health, art, nature and lifestyle. It was produced, edited, directed and hosted by journalist Denise Ingrid Brickel (née Denise Ingrid Aliaga Monge). Recorded in the fall of 2007, The Spirit of New Wine consists of three 26 minute episodes: California Bounty, Sweeter than Wine and New Wine. It was first aired on KRCB, a public television station based in Santa Rosa, California, on October 19, 2008. It features 13 original songs - four by Denise and Thomas Brickel, seven by Patrick Bloom and the Mayflies, and two by James Patrick Regan.

== Interviews ==
The documentary features an interview with Canadian author, broadcaster and theologian Tom Harpur, author of The Spirituality of Wine, Water into Wine, The Pagan Christ, Living Waters, and Born Again, in which the spiritual meaning of wine in the Judeo-Christian faiths is discussed. Other guests interviewed throughout the documentary include Peter Marks, Senior Vice President of Wine at COPIA, the American Center for Wine, Food & the Arts; Aimee Sunseri, Barry Grushkowitz and Sarah Quider, winemakers; Cheryl Forberg, Chef and Nutritionist for NBC's The Biggest Loser; Antone Fahden, owner of Hans Fahden Vineyards; Claudia Sansone, cookbook writer; Jessel Miller, Napa Valley artist; and Kelly McDonald, Napa Valley Wine Train executive chef.

== California Bounty (Episode 1) ==
California Bounty is an overview of wine basics and the intimate relationship between wine and cuisine. Host Denise Ingrid Brickel tastes a variety of California white and red wines and learns practical wine tasting tips from Peter Nelson, wine consultant. The craft of winemaking is discussed at length by Sonoma and Napa vintners Barry Grushkowitz, J.D. Shon, Judd Finklestein and others. Chef Kelly MacDonald offers viewers wine and food pairing recommendations, while Cheryl Forberg, nutritional writer and advisor to NBC's The Biggest Loser, reviews the multiple health benefits of wine.

== Sweeter than Wine (Episode 2) ==
The second episode examines how wine is quickly becoming a part of the U.S. lifestyle. Interviewees discuss how wine represents the search for roots and traditions that are often amiss in American culture. Peter Marks, Master of Wine and Wine Educator, discusses the rising presence of wine in American culture. Winemakers Sarah Quider and Aimee Sunseri speak about the special role of women in winemaking, and they reflect on their own involvement in the wine business. Napa artist Jessel Miller discuss the symbolic relationship between wine and art, while Claudia Sansone, television culinary artist to celebrity chefs, describes the wine country lifestyle and the people who live and love it.

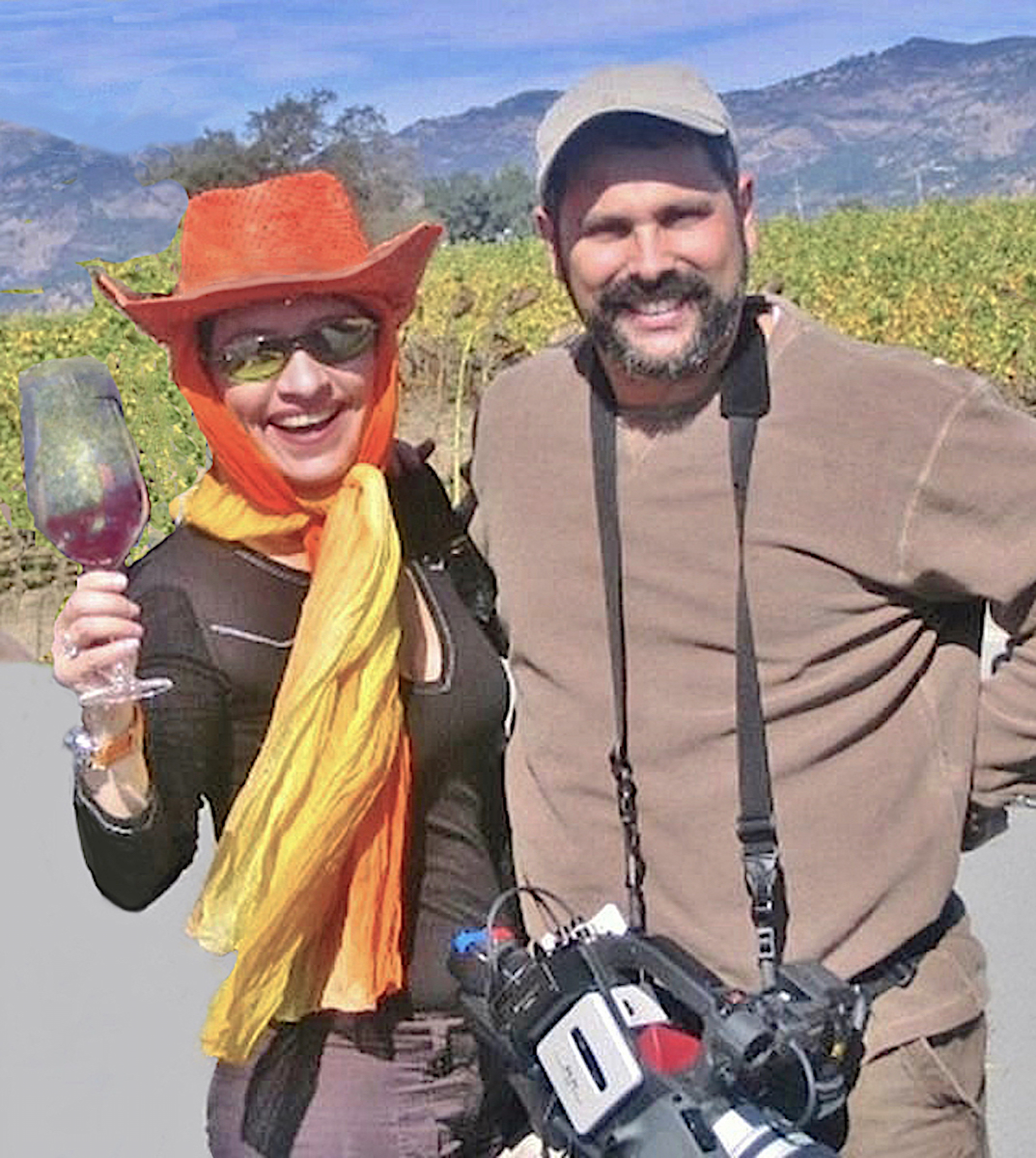
Denise and Thomas Brickel, producers of THE SPIRIT OF NEW WINE

== New Wine (Episode 3) ==
The third episode of the documentary trilogy focuses on the intangible elements wine presents that resemble man's invisible nature. Tom Harpur, Toronto Star journalist and author of The Spirituality of Wine and Water into Wine, discusses the symbolic meaning of pruning and grape crushing, the importance of tending 'the vineyard in one's heart,' the connection between spirituality and nature, and the modern-day relevance of the Biblical expression, 'new wine in old wineskins.' Representatives of the Protestant, Jewish, Muslim and Catholic faiths - Chuck Cody, pastor and wine judge, Ernie Weir, Napa Valley maker of kosher wine, Dr. Mustafa Kuko, director of the Islamic Center of Riverside, and Abbott Thomas Davis of New Clairvaux Abbey, where members of the Cistercian order harvest grapes and make tempranillo wine – discuss the symbolic meaning of wine in their respective faiths.

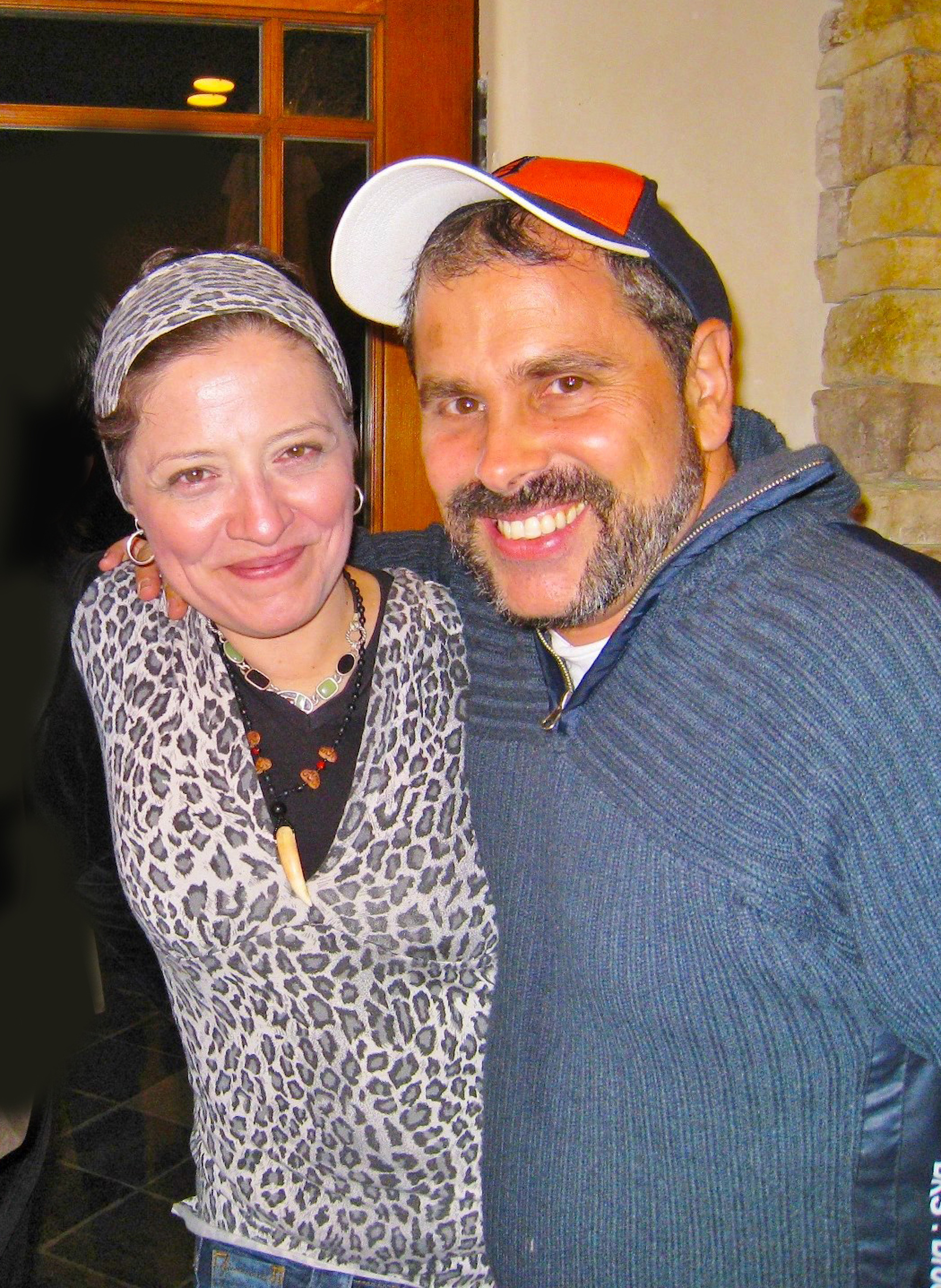
Denise and Thomas Brickel in California

== National broadcasts ==
From 2008 to 2011, eighteen public television stations incorporated The Spirit of New Wine into their programming. These stations included KRCB (Santa Rosa, California), WNIN (Indiana Public Television), WSKG (Pennsylvania/Northern New York), KBDI (Colorado Public Television), New Hampshire Public Television, KTOO/AlaskaOne, WPBS (Canada), KQED (San Francisco, California), EIGHT (Arizona State University), KTEH (Central California), ETV (South Carolina), KEDT (South Texas), KLRN (Austin, Texas), KCSM (San Mateo, California), KVCR (San Bernardino, California), WPSU (Pennsylvania State University), WXEL (West Palm Beach, Florida) and KTWU (Kansas).
