= KUAC =

KUAC may refer to:

- KUAC-TV, a television station (channel 9 analog/24 digital) licensed to Fairbanks, Alaska, United States
- KUAC (FM), a radio station (89.9 FM) licensed to Fairbanks, Alaska, United States
