= KYUK =

KYUK may refer to any of three co-owned public broadcasting stations in Bethel, Alaska:

- KYUK (AM), an NPR news/talk and music station on 640 kHz, established in 1971
- KYUK-FM, a music-only station on 90.3 MHz, established in 2009
- KYUK-LD, a low-power television station licensed to serve Bethel, Alaska, United States
