= KTOO (FM) =

Public radio station in Juneau, Alaska

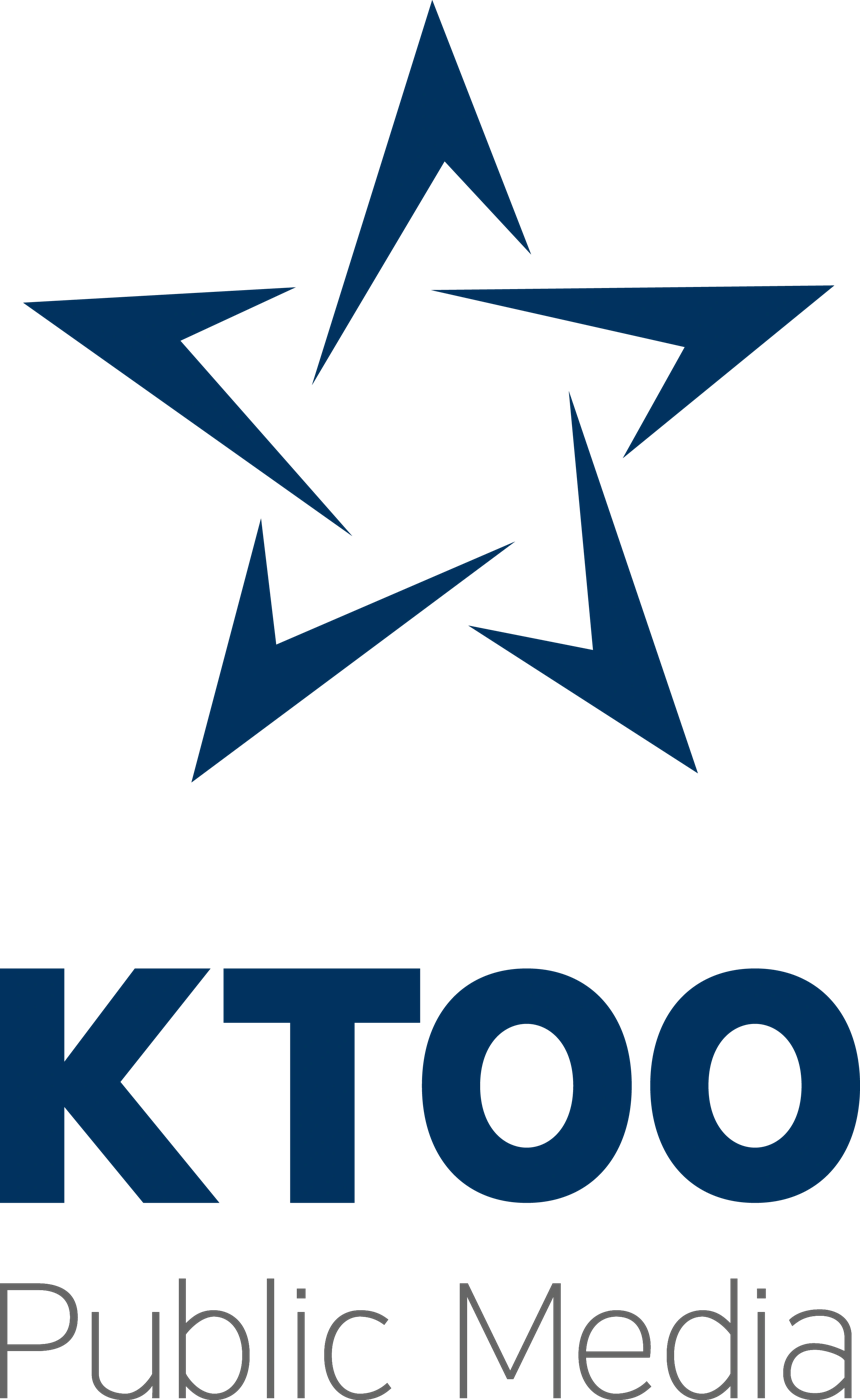

Juneau, Alaska; United States
- Frequency: 104.3 MHz (HD Radio)
- Branding: KTOO News

Programming
- Format: Public radio
- Affiliations: National Public Radio

Ownership
- Owner: Capital Community Broadcasting, Inc.
- Sister stations: KRNN, KXLL

Technical information
- Licensing authority: FCC
- Facility ID: 8650
- Class: A
- ERP: 1,400 watts
- HAAT: −328 meters (−1,076 ft)
- Transmitter coordinates: 58°18′04″N 134°25′21″W

Links
- Public license information: Public file; LMS
- Webcast: Listen Live
- Website: ktoo.org

KTOO (104.3 FM) is a non-commercial educational radio station licensed to serve Juneau, Alaska, United States. The station is owned by KTOO Public Media. It is the radio sister to KTOO-TV, a PBS satellite member station of KAKM.

The station airs public radio programming from NPR.

KTOO also operates KTOO 360TV, a statewide public television service. Programming included Gavel Alaska, the state's legislative and public affairs coverage, and First Nations Experience programming.

KTOO operates two other radio stations, KXLL 100.7 FM and KRNN 102.7 FM. All three are members of the regional organization CoastAlaska and the Alaska Public Radio Network.

All stations share a broadcasting complex in downtown Juneau at 360 Egan Drive.

== Translators ==
KTOO programming is also carried on broadcast translator stations to extend or improve the coverage area of the primary station.

| Call sign | Frequency | City of license | FID | ERP (W) | Class | FCC info |
|---|---|---|---|---|---|---|
| K210AS | 89.9 FM | Excursion Inlet, Alaska | 8645 | 65 | D | LMS |
| K201AM | 88.1 FM | Gustavus, Alaska | 8654 | 51 | D | LMS |
| K220BT | 91.9 FM | Hoonah, Alaska | 8652 | 9 | D | LMS |
| K269AO | 101.7 FM | Lemon Creek, Alaska | 8644 | 10 | D | LMS |
