= CoastAlaska =

CoastAlaska's logo.

CoastAlaska is a nonprofit management service organization for seven public radio stations in Southeast Alaska: KRBD, Ketchikan; KSTK, Wrangell; KTOO, KXLL, KRNN, Juneau; KFSK, Petersburg; and KCAW, Sitka.

In the 1990s, when government funding for public radio was decreasing, the radio stations of Southeast Alaska banded together in an effort to save costs by merging accounting and payroll operations. They also collaboratively funded engineers for miscellaneous technology and transmitter maintenance, as opposed to each station hiring their own engineer. In addition to these services, it also serves as a network to share news stories between news departments throughout Southeast Alaska.

The only Southeast Alaska public radio station that is not a member of CoastAlaska is KHNS, which serves the listening area of Haines, Skagway, and Klukwan (upper Lynn Canal).
