= KHNS =

- Haines, Alaska; United States
- Broadcast area: Alaska Panhandle area
- Frequency: 102.3 MHz (HD Radio)

Programming
- Format: Public radio and variety
- Affiliations: NPR, PRX

Ownership
- Owner: Lynn Canal Broadcasting

Technical information
- Licensing authority: FCC
- Facility ID: 39331
- Class: A
- ERP: 3,000 watts
- HAAT: −372.0 meters (−1,220.5 ft)
- Transmitter coordinates: 59°13′6″N 135°25′29″W

Links
- Public license information: Public file; LMS
- Webcast: Listen live
- Website: khns.org

KHNS (102.3 FM) is a public radio station with principal studios and offices in Haines, Alaska, United States, and secondary studios in Skagway, Alaska.

KHNS is broadcast throughout the upper Lynn Canal area which includes the communities of Haines, Skagway and Klukwan.

== Programming ==
KHNS is the region's only local radio station and offers a wide variety of programming. Local news is produced by staff in Haines, but also covers Skagway, which is 14 miles from Haines via Ferry.

KHNS receives statewide news from the Alaska Public Radio Network, national news from National Public Radio, and international news from the BBC. KHNS also subscribes to a variety of nationally syndicated shows. The station also produces local music shows in a variety of genres.

Notably, KHNS is the only Southeast Alaskan public radio station that is not a member of CoastAlaska.

== Translator ==
Call sign	Frequency	City of license	FID	ERP (W)	HAAT	Class	FCC info
K220BK	91.9 FM	Skagway, Alaska	39333	49	24 m (79 ft)	D	LMS
