= KUAC-TV =

Television station in Fairbanks, Alaska

- Fairbanks, Alaska; United States
- Channels: Digital: 9 (VHF); Virtual: 9
- Branding: KUAC TV 9

Programming
- Affiliations: 9.1: PBS; for others, see § Subchannels

Ownership
- Owner: University of Alaska Fairbanks
- Sister stations: KUAC (FM)

History
- First air date: December 22, 1971
- Former channel numbers: Analog: 9 (VHF, 1971–2009); Digital: 24 (UHF, 2004–2009)
- Call sign meaning: University of Alaska College

Technical information
- Licensing authority: FCC
- Facility ID: 69315
- ERP: 30 kW
- HAAT: 168.9 m (554 ft)
- Transmitter coordinates: 64°54′40″N 147°46′47″W

Links
- Public license information: Public file; LMS
- Website: kuac.org

KUAC-TV (channel 9) is a PBS member television station in Fairbanks, Alaska, United States. It is owned by the University of Alaska Fairbanks alongside NPR member KUAC (89.9 FM). The two stations share studios at the Fine Arts Building/Complex on the UAF campus on Tanana Drive; KUAC-TV's transmitter is located on Bender Mountain. KUAC-TV is the only PBS station in Alaska that is not part of Alaska Public Media, which was established on July 1, 2012.

== History ==
KUAC-TV signed on for the first time on December 22, 1971, as an early Christmas present to the Interior. It was the first public television station in Alaska, and the only one until KAKM in Anchorage signed on in 1975. It originally aired for only five hours a day, from 5 p.m. to 10 p.m. As the difficulties associated with bringing PBS programming decreased, channel 9 increased its schedule, and now operates 24 hours a day.

In 1995, KUAC-TV joined with KTOO-TV in Juneau and KYUK-TV in Bethel to form AlaskaOne, a network of PBS stations serving all of Alaska outside of Anchorage. The three stations formed the Alaska Public Broadcasting Service to air a common PBS schedule. This move was made in hopes of sharing administrative costs. KTOO and KYUK occasionally broke off from the AlaskaOne feed to air programming relevant to their areas, while KUAC-TV used its massive translator network to deliver AlaskaOne programming across the Interior.

On November 18, 2011. the APBS board voted to transfer the operation of the AlaskaOne feed to Alaska Public Telecommunications, owner of Anchorage's PBS station, KAKM. In response, UAF, which cast the lone dissenting vote, announced on December 11 that KUAC-TV would break off from AlaskaOne and revert to being a separate locally-focused PBS station on July 1, 2012. UAF contended that a single statewide PBS service would not meet the needs of the Interior. On July 1, KUAC-TV resumed its original branding of "KUAC TV9," while KTOO and KYUK joined with KAKM to form Alaska Public Media.

== Technical information ==
=== Subchannels ===
The station's digital signal is multiplexed:

Subchannels of KUAC-TV
Channel	Res.	Short name	Programming
9.1	720p	KUAC-1	PBS
9.4	480i	KUAC-4	UAF TV/First Nations Experience (4:3)
9.5	480i	KUAC-5	PBS Kids
9.6	Audio only	KUAC-FM	KUAC-FM
9.9	480i	360TV	KTOO 360TV (4:3)

In 2004, the station signed on the first high-definition public television service in Alaska.

=== Analog-to-digital conversion ===
KUAC-TV shut down its analog signal, over VHF channel 9, in April 2009. The station's digital signal relocated from its pre-transition UHF channel 24 to VHF channel 9.
