= KUAC (FM) =

Public radio station in Fairbanks, Alaska

Coordinates: 64.8798°N 148.0547°W

- Fairbanks, Alaska; United States
- Frequency: 89.9 MHz (HD Radio)
- Branding: KUAC 89.9 FM

Programming
- Format: Public Radio, News/Talk, Classical
- Affiliations: National Public Radio; Public Radio International; American Public Media; Classical 24; XPoNential Radio; BBC World Service

Ownership
- Owner: University of Alaska Fairbanks
- Sister stations: KUAC-TV

History
- First air date: October 1, 1962 (at 104.9 FM)
- Former frequencies: 104.9 MHz (1962–1968); 104.7 MHz (1968–1998)
- Call sign meaning: University of Alaska College

Technical information
- Licensing authority: FCC
- Facility ID: 85347
- Class: C
- ERP: 38,000 watts
- HAAT: 506 meters (1,660 ft)
- Translator: see below

Links
- Public license information: Public file; LMS
- Webcast: KUAC Webstream
- Website: kuac.org

KUAC is a non-commercial FM radio station in Fairbanks, Alaska, broadcasting at 89.9 MHz. The station is operated by the University of Alaska Fairbanks. It debuted on October 2, 1962, originally at 104.9 MHz, as Alaska's first non-commercial radio station and second FM station (after KNIK in Anchorage).

KUAC airs public radio programming, primarily from National Public Radio, Public Radio International and American Public Media, as well as other sources, such as the Alaska Public Radio Network. In keeping with its roots, numerous multi-hour blocks of classical and jazz musics are programmed throughout the schedule, as well as programs focusing on more modern genres such as Afropop Worldwide, Beale Street Caravan, Hearts of Space, Mountain Stage and World Cafe. The station has an extensive pool of volunteers, who produce many hours of locally originated programming per week, mostly in the evenings and on weekends.

== History ==
On October 1, 1962, the University of Alaska Fairbanks launched KUAC, the first public radio station in the state of Alaska and the first FM in Interior Alaska, at 104.9 FM. It replaced an older carrier current station on the campus. Despite being the first—and for years, the only—FM station in the region, listenership was high, and ownership of FM radios in Fairbanks was above the national average by 1967. With no other public stations in the state, some KUAC output, such as the newspaper editorial roundup Alaska's Opinions, was duplicated onto tapes and sent out to commercial stations statewide.

KUAC-FM began broadcasting in stereo in January 1968, more than a month later than planned, after strong demand for stereo radio equipment prompted manufacturers to be backlogged on orders. Later that year, the station moved to 104.7 MHz and increased the effective radiated power of its transmitter, then located atop the Student Union Building, to 10,500 watts.

KUAC broadcast mostly classical music, news and talk programming, as well as other educational features such as recorded classes on tape for elementary school students. As part of the launch of KUAC-TV channel 9 in 1971, the station moved from its original home in Constitution Hall to newer, larger studios in the university's Fine Arts Complex. (The Constitution Hall studios would be used to launch carrier current campus station KMPS, a predecessor to KSUA.) KUAC joined National Public Radio and began airing All Things Considered that August; the program was fed to Fairbanks by a satellite link from Stanford University via the ATS-1 communications satellite. Other news and music programs were sent to KUAC on midnight Pan Am flights from Oregon. The station also had to survive budget cuts in 1986 that threatened to end the entire UAF broadcasting operation.

KUAC also began to expand its coverage into remote areas of the state. This often required innovative engineering solutions. In 1985, a translator was set up to serve Central, Circle and Circle Hot Springs; as grid power was not available at the transmitter site, the facility ran off solar power and was equipped with batteries, allowing it to run during the dark Alaskan winters. In November 1997, KUAC began to air in Nome.

Until 1982, the portion of the FM band below 100 MHz, including the typical noncommercial educational reserved band of 88–92 MHz, was reserved in Alaska for telecommunications purposes. As a result, KUAC, as well as other public radio stations in Alaska such as KSKA, operated on licenses that, if sold, could be converted to commercial operation. In 1995, the station landed a $178,000 federal grant to build a new, more powerful facility broadcasting with 38,000 watts at 89.9 MHz—in the reserved band—atop the Ester Dome. By comparison, the 104.7 facility was atop the shorter Bender Mountain at 10,000 watts. 89.9 MHz, initially bearing the call letters KUAB, came to air in April 1997, maintaining public radio service while the studio-transmitter link to the 104.7 transmitter on Bender Mountain was broken.

The new facility in the reserved band opened up the ability for the University of Alaska Fairbanks to sell the 104.7 license to a commercial buyer. Capstar, a forerunner to iHeartMedia, acquired the 104.7 license for $205,000 in February 1998. On June 22, that frequency became a commercial alternative rock outlet known as "The Edge"; its call letters changed to KKED on July 10.

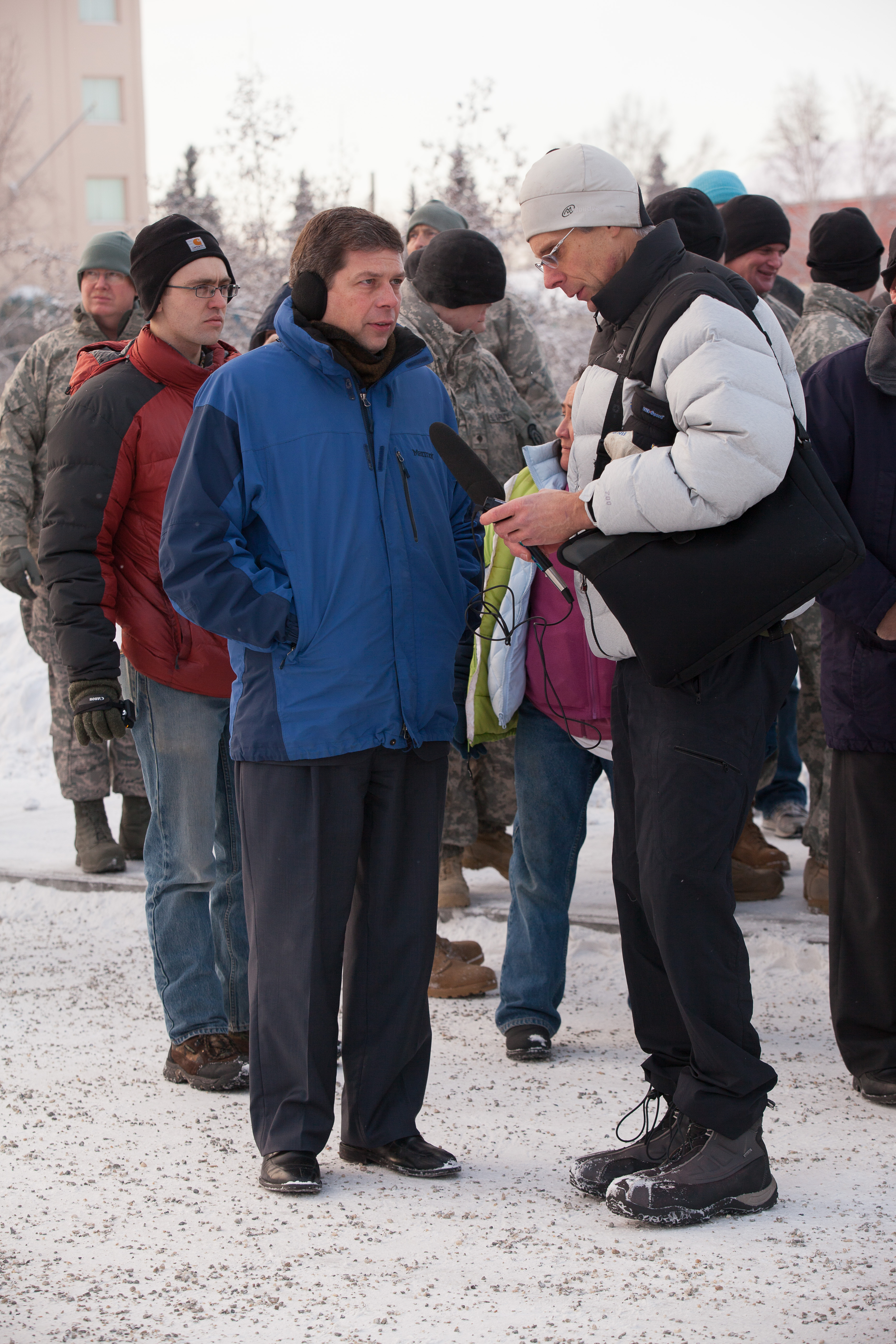
KUAC news director Dan Bross interviews U.S. Senator Mark Begich in downtown Fairbanks on November 12, 2012.

Since the 2010s, KUAC has contended with years of budget cuts from the state government. Between 2012 and 2017, university funding for the station declined by 56 percent. The station has responded with multiple rounds of staff and service cutbacks. The station eliminated its program director role in 2014. In 2017, KUAC cut ties with the Alaska Public Radio Network—an action contemplated previously—and ceased broadcasting in HD Radio. In 2019, further cuts—from the state, which eliminated all direct funding to public broadcasting, and at the university—prompted the discontinuation of several multicast services by KUAC radio and television. In order to keep the stations in operation, the university forgave an $800,000 loan used to rebuild the radio antenna and update television master control equipment. Other difficulties have come from operating in Alaska's winters: in 2012, a thick layer of ice and snow coated the tower and the antennas on top of it, weakening the station's signal.

== Digital television rebroadcast ==
KUAC FM broadcasts on sister station KUAC-TV on channel 9.6.

Channel	Programming
9.1	Main KUAC-TV programming / PBS
9.2	World
9.3	Create
9.4	UAF TV/First Nations Experience
9.5	PBS Kids
9.6	KUAC FM

== Translators ==
Broadcast translators for KUAC
Call sign	Frequency	City of license	FID	ERP (W)	Class	FCC info
K226AY	93.1 FM	Bettles, Alaska	142605	60	D	LMS
K219AQ	91.7 FM	Delta Junction, Alaska	69215	125	D	LMS
K219DM	91.7 FM	Eagle, Alaska	90668	155	D	LMS
K269AD	101.7 FM	Healy, Alaska	69002	50	D	LMS
K216AN	91.1 FM	Nenana, Alaska	69330	43	D	LMS
K217CK	91.3 FM	Nome, Alaska	811	188	D	LMS
K216DT	91.1 FM	Tok, Alaska	88474	187	D	LMS
