= KSTK =

Coordinates: 56.454°N 132.383°W

- Wrangell, Alaska; United States
- Broadcast area: Alaska Panhandle
- Frequency: 101.7 MHz (HD Radio)
- Branding: 101.7 KSTK

Programming
- Format: Public Radio

Ownership
- Owner: CoastAlaska, Inc.

Technical information
- Licensing authority: FCC
- Facility ID: 73924
- Class: A
- ERP: 3,000 watts
- HAAT: -106 meters

Links
- Public license information: Public file; LMS
- Website: www.kstk.org

KSTK is a non-commercial radio station in Wrangell, Alaska, broadcasting on 101.7 FM. The station airs public radio programming from the National Public Radio network and the BBC World Service. The station also airs some locally originated programming.

KSTK is a member of CoastAlaska.

The public radio consortium Coast-Alaska agreed to acquire Wrangell station KSTK in 2019 because of funding challenges faced by KSTK on both the state and national level, as the Corporation for Public Broadcasting (CPB) had raised the threshold to receive a federal grant to stations having $300,000 of local and state funding, which was a challenge for a small Wrangell community in Alaska of around 3000 people.

== Translators ==
Broadcast translator for KSTK
Call sign	Frequency	City of license	FID	ERP (W)	Class	FCC info
K296FN	107.1 FM	North Wrangell Island, Alaska	156538	10	D	LMS
K220CV	91.9 FM	Wrangell, Etc., Alaska	73925	51	D	LMS
