= Nellie Jimmie =

American politician and community leader (born 1979)

Nellie Unangiq Jimmie
- Unangik

Member of the Alaska House of Representatives from the 38th district
- Incumbent
- Assumed office January 21, 2025
- Preceded by: Conrad McCormick

Personal details
- Born: 1979 (age 46–47) Bethel, Alaska, U.S.
- Party: Democratic
- Children: 2

Nellie Darlene Jimmie (Yup'ik: Unangik; born 1979) is an American politician and community leader serving as a member of the Alaska House of Representatives for district 38. She previously operated a local business and was a representative on the Alaska Village Electric Cooperative board for Toksook Bay, Alaska.

== Early life and education ==
Nellie D. Jimmie, also known by her Yup'ik name Unangik, was born in Bethel, Alaska, in 1979. She is of Yup'ik, Ojibwa, and Lakota descent, and her upbringing was rooted in the subsistence lifestyle of her community, including activities such as fishing, hunting, and gathering. Her parents are Alexie and Aleta Jimmie, from whom she learned traditional knowledge and cultural practices. Jimmie spent her early years in Bethel before moving to Toksook Bay in 1987.

She graduated from Nelson Island High School in 1996 and later attended the Alaska Job Corps Center, completing a program in 2000. She completed some college coursework at the University of Phoenix in 2009.

== Career ==
Jimmie served as the Alaska Village Electric Cooperative (AVEC) board representative for Toksook Bay. She worked with her family in operating Bayview General Merchandise Inc.

During the 2024 Alaska House of Representatives election, Jimmie ran to represent district 38. Her opponents included the incumbent, Conrad McCormick, a Democrat from Bethel; Willy Keppel of the Veterans of Alaska Party; and Victoria Sosa, a Democrat from Bethel who dropped out of the race but remained on the ballot. She secured 44 percent of the vote in the primary election. McCormick outraised Jimmie by a substantial margin, bringing in $37,558 to her $6,565 as of October 17. In the general election, Jimmie won with 51.04 percent of the vote after the ranked-choice voting process, narrowly defeating McCormick by 58 votes.

Jimmie's campaign emphasized addressing housing shortages, improving water and sewer infrastructure, and managing subsistence resources. She advocated for enhanced support and training for village public safety officers and highlighted the need for public health services in rural areas, such as having medical examiners available closer to remote communities. Her legislative priorities included preserving traditional ways of life, addressing climate change impacts such as erosion and flooding, and fostering cooperation with tribal governments.

== Personal life ==
Jimmie resides in Toksook Bay, Alaska, where she has lived since 1987. She is the mother of two daughters. Since 2012, she has been a member of the Nunakauyak Dance Group, participating in traditional Yup'ik dances. Her hobbies include sewing, crafting, and subsistence activities.

== Electoral history ==
=== 2024 ===
==== Primary ====
2024 Nonpartisan primary
Party	Candidate	Votes	%
Democratic	Nellie "Unangiq" Jimmie	660	43.8
Democratic	Conrad McCormick (incumbent)	426	28.3
Veterans of Alaska	Willy Keppel	309	20.5
Democratic	Victoria Sosa	111	7.4
Total votes		1,506	100.0

==== General ====
Alaska House of Representatives General election, district 38
Party	Candidate	First Choice		Round 1			Round 2			Round 3	
Party	Candidate	Votes	%	Votes	%	Transfer	Votes	%	Transfer	Votes	%
Democratic	Nellie "Unangiq" Jimmie	1,380	36.7%	1,295	36.2%	+56	1,351	38.5%	+197	1,548	52.3%
Democratic	Conrad McCormick (incumbent)	1,212	32.2%	1,166	32.6%	+34	1,200	34.2%	+211	1,411	47.7%
Veterans of Alaska	Willy Keppel	971	25.8%	932	26.1%	+27	959	27.3%	-959	Eliminated	
Democratic	Victoria Sosa	187	5.0%	184	5.1%	-184	Eliminated				
Write-in		13	0.4%	Eliminated							
Total votes		3,763		3,577			3,510			2,959	
Blank or inactive ballots				130		+67	197		+551	748	

== See also ==
- Native American women in politics
