= KRBD =

Coordinates: 55.339°N 131.626°W

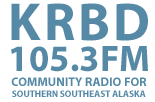
- Ketchikan, Alaska; United States
- Broadcast area: Alaska Panhandle
- Frequency: 105.3 MHz (HD Radio)

Programming
- Format: Public radio

Ownership
- Owner: Rainbird Community Broadcasting

History
- First air date: May 22, 1976
- Former frequencies: 105.9 MHz

Technical information
- Licensing authority: FCC
- Facility ID: 54928
- Class: A
- ERP: 3,400 watts
- HAAT: 21 meters (69 ft)
- Translator: See § Translators

Links
- Public license information: Public file; LMS
- Website: www.krbd.org

KRBD is a non-commercial radio station in Ketchikan, Alaska, broadcasting on 105.3 FM. The station airs public radio programming from the National Public Radio network, the BBC World Service, and is a member of CoastAlaska. KRBD also airs some locally originated programming.

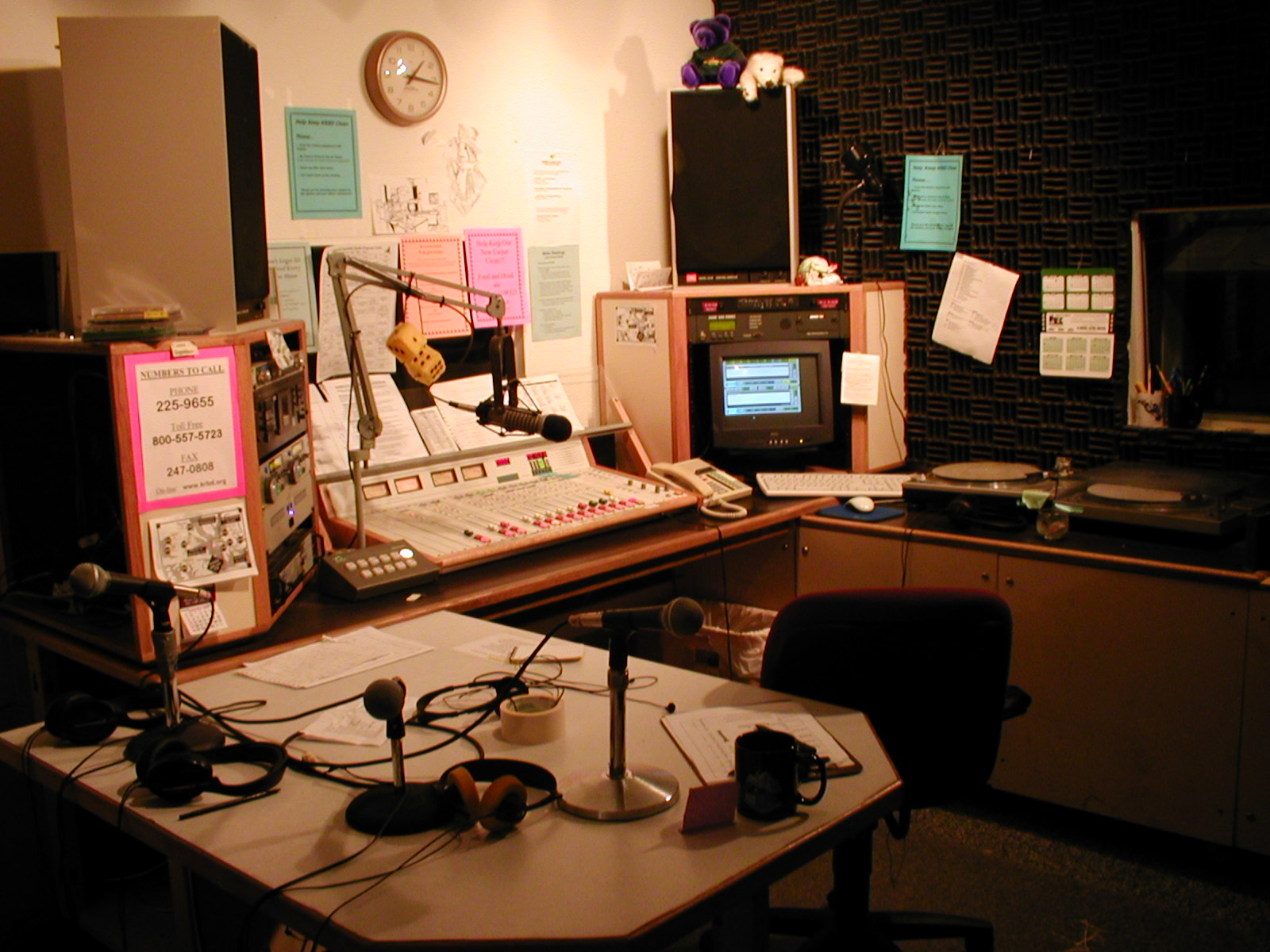
The KRBD studio

In the planning stages, the founding group originally wanted to name the station KOHO, and later KBRD, but both call signs were already taken. They ultimately settled on KRBD, which stands for "Rainbird Broadcasting," a reference to one of the mascots of Ketchikan. Early on, planners also debated whether the station should broadcast on AM or FM. While AM signals could more easily traverse the region's mountainous terrain and obstacles, the group chose FM for its superior sound quality. This decision meant the station eventually had to build multiple transmitters and translators to successfully deliver the signal across Southern Southeast Alaska.

The station's first broadcast, on May 22, 1976, opened with the song, "The Fool," by Quicksilver Messenger Service on volunteer Tom Miller's show, "Odds and Ends." At that time, the station had seven licensed volunteers, each one covering a day of the week, and each one responsible for recruiting more volunteers.

At first, the station operated out of a single apartment space on the first floor of the 10-story Marine View Building. Its 10-watt transmitter broadcast mostly to listeners within a few miles of Ketchikan's West End neighborhood.

The community licensee was conceived of and built by volunteers. Soon after it went on the air, the station hired a manager/engineer, Bob Kern, of Ketchikan. KRBD continued to grow along with the State of Alaska's oil wealth. Within a few years, the station moved up to the Marine View's 10th floor, where it occupied two large apartment spaces. As it continued to grow, KRBD increased power to its current 3,400 watts and moved to a downtown Ketchikan location at 716 Totem Way, overlooking Ketchikan Creek.

At one point in the 1980s, the station had 10 employees and was able to send them to various training opportunities in and outside of Alaska. Its volunteer crew also grew, numbering as many as 90 in its heyday in the 1980s. KRBD is notable for having a sizable group of youth and teens comprise a portion of the volunteer body.

When the state's budget declined due to lower oil prices, and later due to declining oil production, so did KRBD's. By 2007, the station had about four employees and a much reduced volunteer corp. Throughout its history, volunteers have played an important role in operating the station, especially in producing its varied music programming.

In the early 1990s, the station moved yet again, when it purchased the building at 123 Stedman Street, a few doors down the street from Totem Way. In 2010, KRBD moved to a fifth location known as "The Rock Pit" on Copper Ridge Lane.

== Translators ==
Broadcast translators of KRBD
Call sign	Frequency (MHz)	City of license	Facility ID	Class	ERP (W)
K269CA	107.1	Clover Pass, Alaska	54926	D	28
K269BA	101.7	Craig, Alaska	54930	D	45
K211AV	90.1	Hydaburg, Alaska	54927	D	9
K211AX	90.1	Klawock, Alaska	54931	D	90
K211AT	90.1	Mountain Point, Alaska	54934	D	81
K214BD	90.7	North Point Higgins, Alaska	54933	D	9
K211AU	90.1	Thorne Bay, Alaska	54936	D	18
