= Bethel Broadcasting, Incorporated =

Public broadcaster in Bethel, Alaska, United States

KYUK and KYUK-FM

Bethel, Alaska; United States
- Broadcast area: Yukon–Kuskokwim Delta (Southwestern Alaska)
- Frequencies: KYUK: 640 kHz; KYUK-FM: 90.3 MHz

Programming
- Language(s): KYUK: English, Yupik languages; KYUK-FM: English
- Format: KYUK: Public radio, music; KYUK-FM: Freeform
- Affiliations: Alaska Public Radio; NPR; PRX; Native Voice Communications; American Indian Radio on Satellite

Ownership
- Owner: Bethel Broadcasting, Inc.
- Sister stations: KYUK-FM, KYUK-TV

History
- First air date: KYUK: May 13, 1971; KYUK-FM: December 2009
- Former frequencies: KYUK: 580 kHz

Technical information
- Licensing authority: FCC
- Facility ID: KYUK: 4963; KYUK-FM: 172683
- Class: KYUK: A; KYUK-FM: A
- Power: KYUK: 10,000 watts; KYUK-FM: 385 watts
- HAAT: KYUK-FM: 23 meters (75 ft)
- Transmitter coordinates: KYUK: 60°46′56.7″N 161°53′8.6″W; KYUK-FM: 60°47′30.3″N 161°46′30.3″W
- Translator(s): KYUK: 91.9 K220EA (Aniak)

Links
- Public license information: KYUK: Public file; LMS; KYUK-FM: Public file; LMS
- Website: kyuk.org

Bethel Broadcasting, Incorporated, doing business as KYUK, KYUK-FM and KYUK-TV is a non-profit corporation dedicated to serving the Yup'ik Eskimo and residents of populations of southwest Alaska with local, non-commercial public radio and television. KYUK is a National Public Radio and Alaska Public Radio affiliate and PBS member station through the Alaska One Public Television Network. KYUK is located in Bethel, Alaska, a town situated on the banks of the Kuskokwim River within the Yukon/Kuskokwim Delta region of southwestern Alaska.

KYUK has maintained an archive of their programs and productions. The Archive has over 5,000 audio and video recordings from the mid-1970s to the present. The mission of the Archive is to preserve, organize, store and make accessible moving image and sound recordings produced by KYUK Television and Radio about the culture, language, history and contemporary life of Yup'ik people and residents of the region.

The contents of the Archive include local news footage, newscasts, long form documentaries and documentary production elements, instructional public affairs, feature magazine shows, and Yup'ik dance performance programs. Many programs were produced in both English and Yup'ik languages.

== KYUK ==
KYUK is an AM public radio clear-channel station. It is licensed for 10 kW on 640 kHz. It primarily features programming from National Public Radio and Native Voice One. The latter network occasionally airs a pair of network identification spots which originated from the station, featuring former news reporters Charles Enoch and Julia Jimmie. In these clips, Enoch and Jimmie reference nearby Tuntutuliak (the hometown of both), the station and its location on the Kuskokwim River.

KYUK claims to have been the first Native-owned and operated radio station in the United States when it first went on the air in 1971.

== KYUK-FM ==
KYUK-FM is an FM public radio station broadcasting at 90.3 MHz. It plays music with different genres at different times of day. It went on the air in Bethel in December 2009.

== Translators ==
Call sign	Frequency	City of license	FID	ERP (W)	HAAT	Class	FCC info
K220EA	91.9 FM	Aniak, Alaska	4976	35	7 m (23 ft)	D	LMS
