= Toksook Bay, Alaska =

Toksook Bay Nunakauyaq, Tuqsuq/Tuqsuk
- City
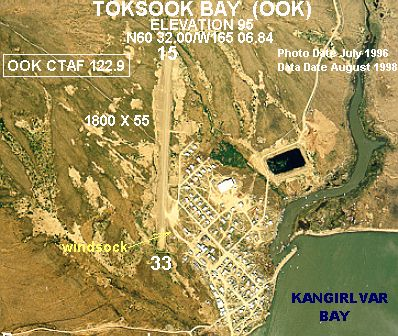
- Aerial photo of Toksook Bay Airport

- Location in Alaska
- Coordinates: 60°31′50″N 165°06′12″W
- Country: United States
- State: Alaska
- Census Area: Bethel
- Incorporated: April 4, 1972

Government
  - Mayor: Sam Chanar
  - State senator: Lyman Hoffman (D)
  - State rep.: Nellie Unangiq Jimmie (D)

Area
  - Total: 70.53 sq mi (182.67 km^{2})
  - Land: 28.71 sq mi (74.35 km^{2})
  - Water: 41.82 sq mi (108.32 km^{2})
- Elevation: 0 ft (0 m)

Population (2020)
  - Total: 658
  - Density: 22.9/sq mi (8.85/km^{2})
- Time zone: UTC−9 (Alaska (AKST))
  - Summer (DST): UTC−8 (AKDT)
- ZIP Code: 99637
- Area code: 907
- FIPS code: 02-78240
- GNIS feature ID: 1411060, 2418864

Toksook Bay (TOOK-sook or TUCK-sook) is a city and village on Nelson Island in Bethel Census Area, Alaska. As of the 2020 census, Toksook Bay had a population of 658.

Toksook Bay (pronounced Tuqsuk Bay in Yup'ik) was established in 1964 by residents of nearby Nightmute. Nunakauyaq is its ‘real name’. Almost the entire population are members of the Alaska Native Nunakauyarmiut ("People of Nunakauyaq"), who rely on fishing and other subsistence activities.

== History ==
The community was chosen as the site of first enumeration of the 2020 U.S. census, due to the remoteness of the Alaskan Bush and the necessity of collecting census data early from remote sites. The enumeration started on January 21, 2020.

== Demographics ==
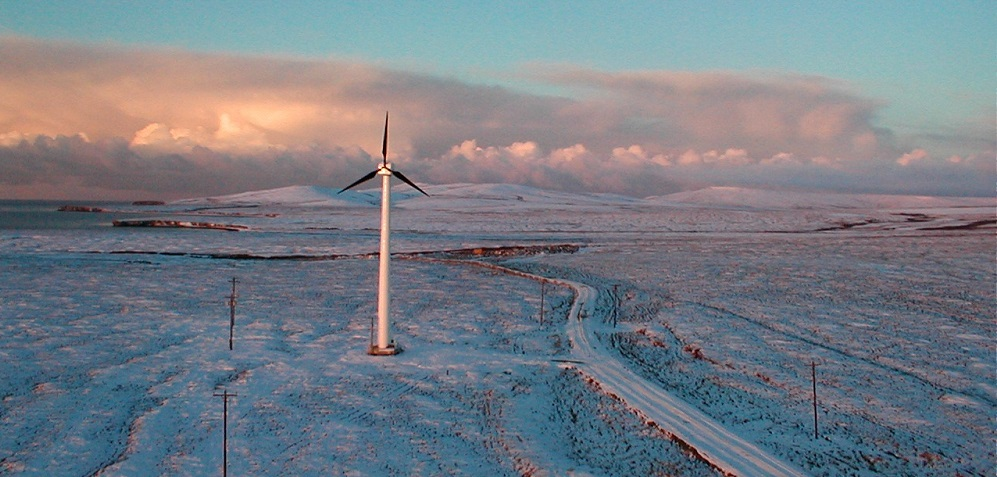
Wind turbine in Toksook Bay

Historical population
Census	Pop.	Note	%±
1970	257		—
1980	333		29.6%
1990	420		26.1%
2000	532		26.7%
2010	590		10.9%
2020	658		11.5%
U.S. Decennial Census

Toksook Bay first appeared on the 1970 U.S. census as an unincorporated village. It formally incorporated in 1972.

=== 2020 census ===
As of the 2020 census, Toksook Bay had a population of 658. The median age was 25.4 years. 37.2% of residents were under the age of 18 and 8.4% of residents were 65 years of age or older. For every 100 females there were 108.9 males, and for every 100 females age 18 and over there were 114.0 males age 18 and over.

0.0% of residents lived in urban areas, while 100.0% lived in rural areas.

There were 133 households in Toksook Bay, of which 65.4% had children under the age of 18 living in them. Of all households, 58.6% were married-couple households, 20.3% were households with a male householder and no spouse or partner present, and 18.8% were households with a female householder and no spouse or partner present. About 10.6% of all households were made up of individuals and 3.0% had someone living alone who was 65 years of age or older.

There were 134 housing units, of which 0.7% were vacant. The homeowner vacancy rate was 0.0% and the rental vacancy rate was 0.0%.

Racial composition as of the 2020 census
Race	Number	Percent
White	19	2.9%
Black or African American	0	0.0%
American Indian and Alaska Native	635	96.5%
Asian	0	0.0%
Native Hawaiian and Other Pacific Islander	0	0.0%
Some other race	0	0.0%
Two or more races	4	0.6%
Hispanic or Latino (of any race)	1	0.2%

=== 2000 census ===
As of the census of 2000, there were 532 people, 106 households, and 94 families residing in the city. The population density was 16.1 inhabitants per square mile (6.2/km^{2}). There were 110 housing units at an average density of 3.3 per square mile (1.3/km^{2}). The racial makeup of the city was 2.44% white, 94.36% Native American, and 3.20% from two or more races.

There were 106 households, out of which 68.9% had children under the age of 18 living with them, 65.1% were married couples living together, 12.3% had a female householder with no husband present, and 11.3% were non-families. Of all households 10.4% were made up of individuals, and 0.9% had someone living alone who was 65 years of age or older. The average household size was 5.02 and the average family size was 5.45.

In the city, the age distribution of the population shows 44.0% under the age of 18, 9.8% from 18 to 24, 27.4% from 25 to 44, 14.1% from 45 to 64, and 4.7% who were 65 years of age or older. The median age was 22 years. For every 100 females, there were 118.0 males. For every 100 females age 18 and over, there were 124.1 males.

The median income for a household in the city was $30,208, and the median income for a family was $32,188. Males had a median income of $22,813 versus $36,250 for females. The per capita income for the city was $8,761. About 26.9% of families and 27.3% of the population were below the poverty line, including 37.4% of those under age 18 and 28.6% of those age 65 or over.

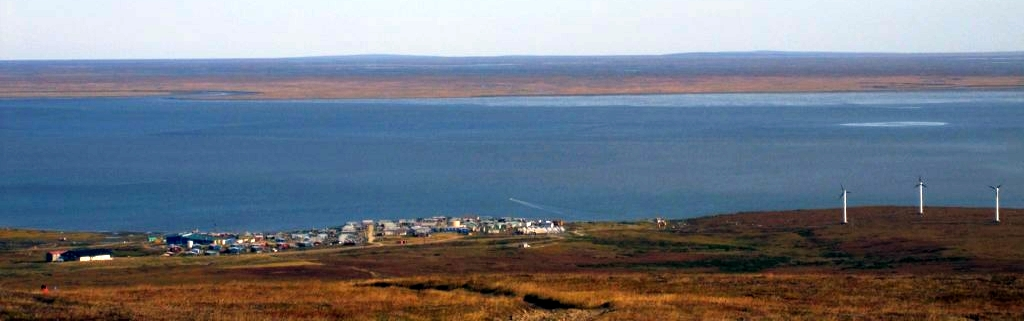
View south toward Toksook Bay

== Education ==
The Lower Kuskokwim School District operates Nelson Island School, K–12.
