= KSKA =

Public radio station in Anchorage, Alaska

Coordinates: 61.422°N 149.874°W

Anchorage, Alaska; United States
- Frequency: 91.1 MHz (HD Radio)
- Branding: KSKA

Programming
- Format: Public radio
- Affiliations: NPR

Ownership
- Owner: Alaska Public Media; (Alaska Public Telecommunications)

History
- First air date: August 28, 1978
- Former frequencies: 103.1 MHz

Technical information
- Licensing authority: FCC
- Facility ID: 805
- Class: C1
- ERP: 100,000 watts
- HAAT: 188 meters

Links
- Public license information: Public file; LMS
- Webcast: Listen Live
- Website: alaskapublic.org

KSKA (91.1 FM) is a non-commercial radio station in Anchorage, Alaska, United States. The station airs public radio programming from the NPR network and the BBC World Service. KSKA also airs some locally originated programming.

Former logo

== Translators ==
KSKA makes use of broadcast translators to increase the coverage of the main station on 91.1 MHz.

Broadcast translators for KSKA
Call sign	Frequency	City of license	FID	ERP (W)	Class	FCC info
K261EI	100.1 FM	Anchorage, Alaska	147978	250	D	LMS
K220AL	91.9 FM	Girdwood, Alaska	810	52	D	LMS
K216BN	91.1 FM	Prudhoe Bay, Alaska	806	48	D	LMS
K216BG	91.1 FM	Unalaska, Alaska	68755	130	D	LMS
