= Bethel, Alaska =

City in Alaska, United States

Bethel, Alaska Mamterilleq Orutsaraq
- City
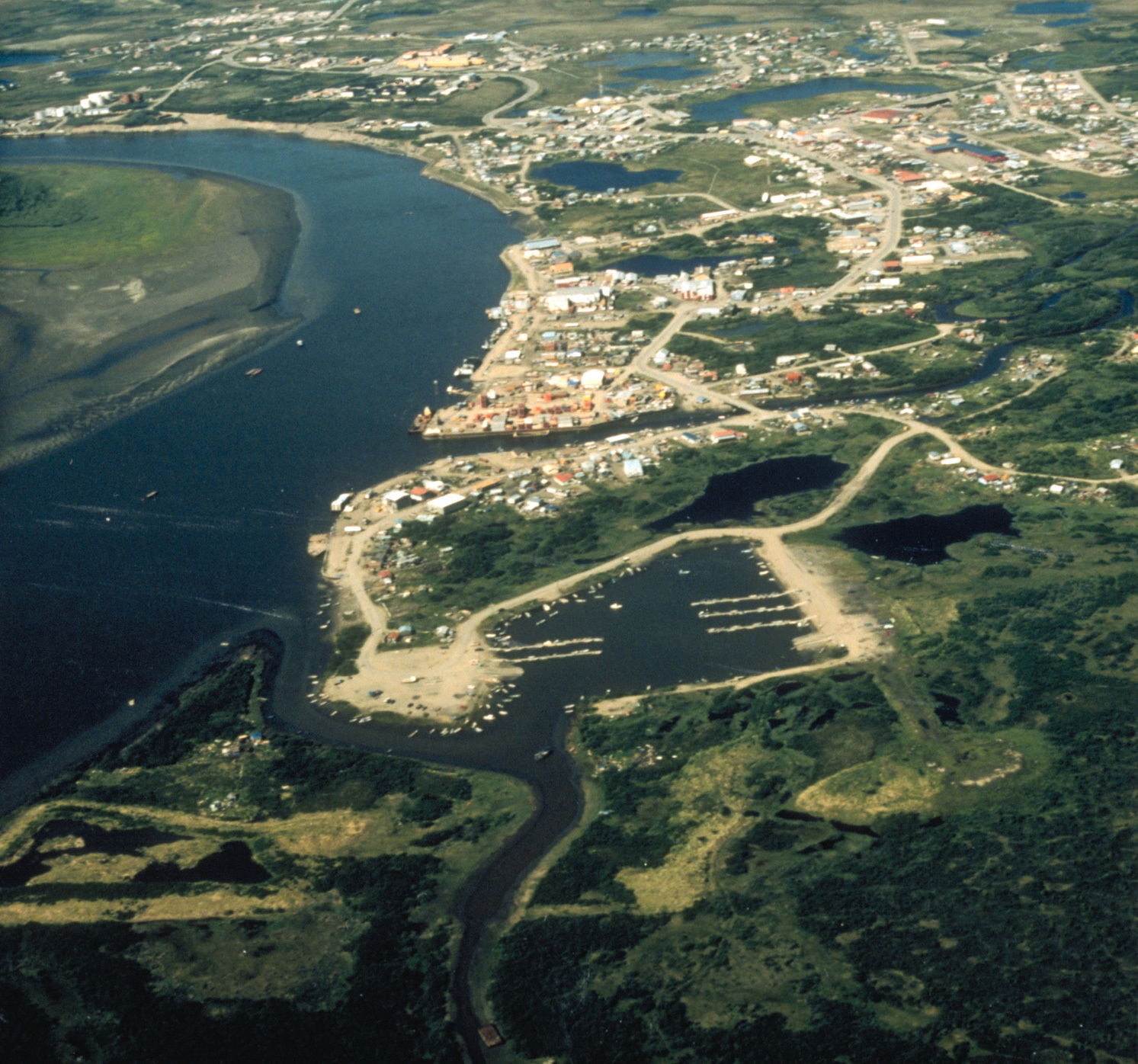
- Aerial view of Bethel on the Kuskokwim River

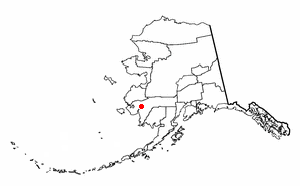
- Location of Bethel within the state of Alaska
- Coordinates: 60°47′32″N 161°45′21″W
- Country: United States
- State: Alaska
- Borough: Unorganized
- Census Area: Bethel
- ANCSA regional corporation: Calista
- Incorporated: August 1957

Government
  - Type: Council–manager government
  - Mayor: Rose Henderson
  - Vice-Mayor: Teresa Keller
  - State senator: Lyman Hoffman (D)
  - State rep.: Nellie Jimmie (D)
  - City Council: Mark Springer; Pamela Conrad; Alicia Miner; Kelsi Kime; Greg Schiedler

Area
  - Total: 50.11 sq mi (129.78 km^{2})
  - Land: 44.51 sq mi (115.27 km^{2})
  - Water: 5.60 sq mi (14.51 km^{2})
- Elevation: 3.3 ft (1 m)

Population (2020)
  - Total: 6,325
  - Estimate (2021): 6,270
  - Density: 142.1/sq mi (54.87/km^{2})
  - Alaska Native: 62%
- Time zone: UTC-9 (AKST)
  - Summer (DST): UTC-8 (AKDT)
- ZIP code: 99559
- Area code: 907
- FIPS code: 02-06520
- GNIS feature ID: 1398908
- Website: cityofbethel.org

Bethel (Central Yupik: Mamterilleq) is a city in the U.S. state of Alaska, located on the Kuskokwim River approximately 50 miles (80 km) from where the river flows into Kuskokwim Bay. It is the largest community in western Alaska and in the Unorganized Borough, as well as the eighth-largest in the state. Bethel has a population of 6,325 as of the 2020 census, up from 6,080 in 2010.

Annual events in Bethel include the Kuskokwim 300 dogsled race; Camai, a Yup'ik dance festival held each spring; and the Bethel Fair held in August.

== History ==
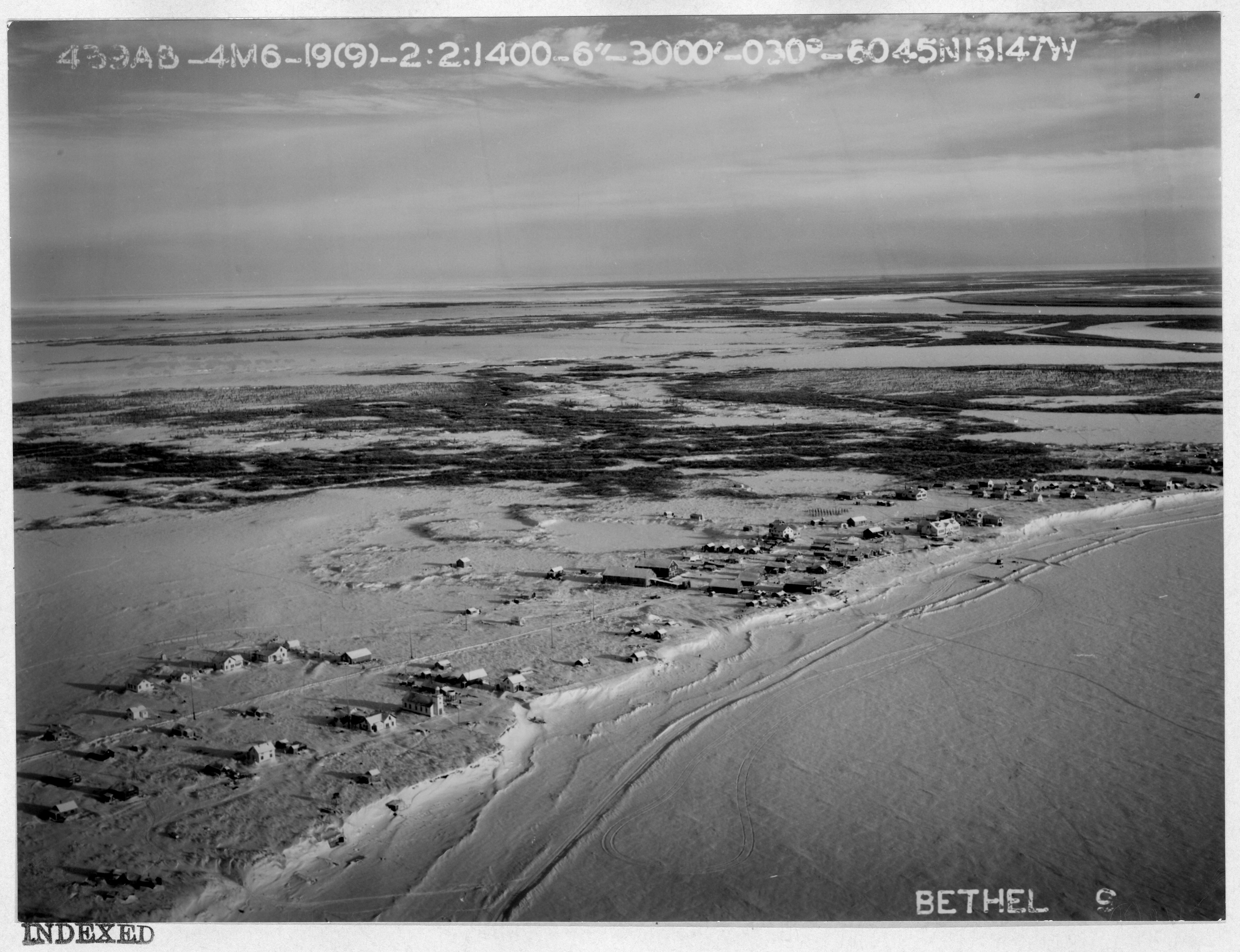
Bethel in the 1940s, winter

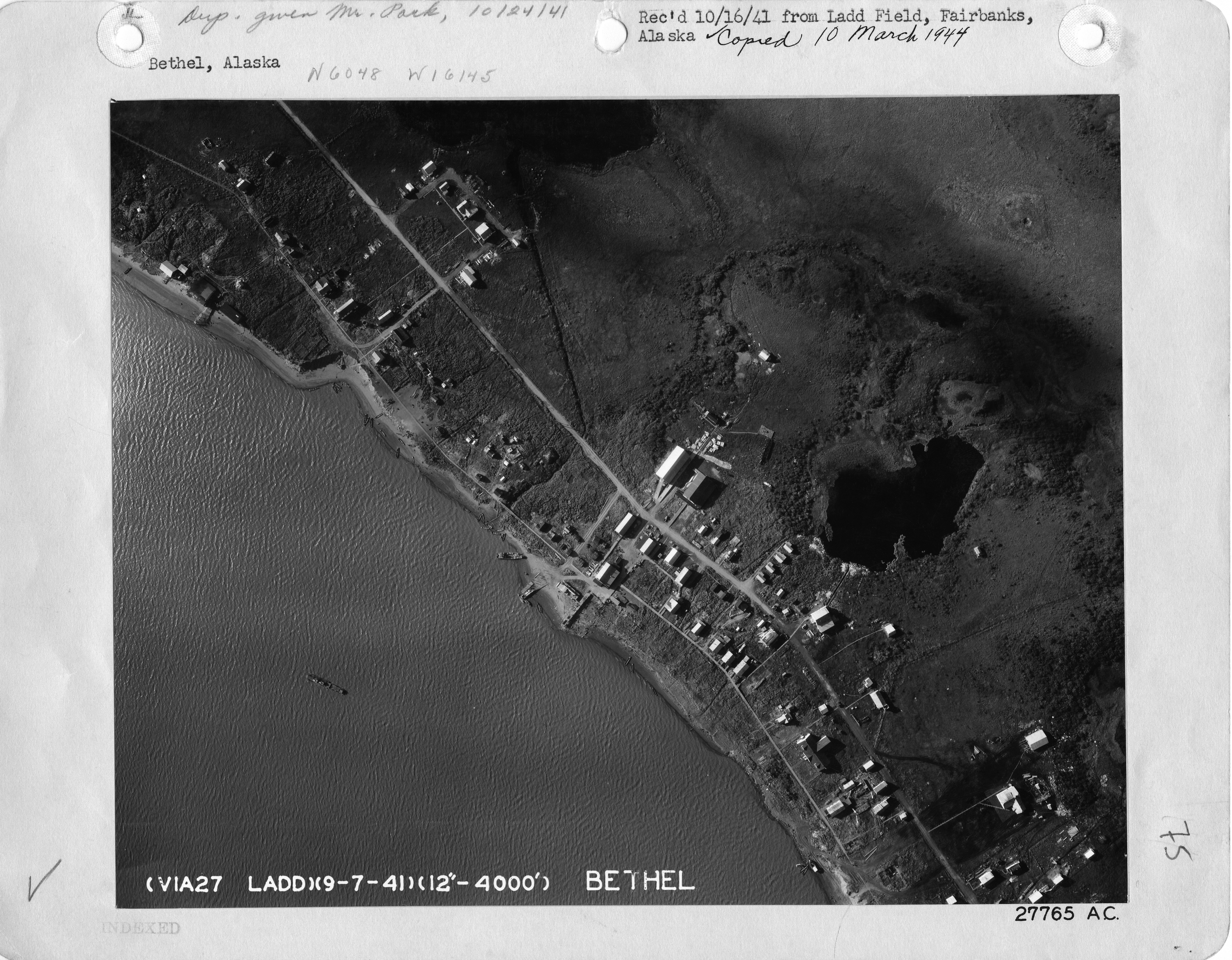
Bethel in 1941, summer

Southwestern Alaska has been the homeland of Yup'ik peoples and their ancestors for thousands of years. The residents of what became Bethel were called the Mamterillermiut, meaning "Smokehouse People", after their nearby fish smokehouse. In the late 19th century, the Alaska Commercial Company established a trading post in the town, called Mumtrekhlogamute, which had a population of 41 people by the 1880 census.

In 1885, the Moravian Church established a mission in the area under the leadership of William and Caroline Weinland and John and Edith Kilbuck. He made Yup'ik the language of the Moravian Church in the community and region, and helped translate the Christian Bible into the language. The missionaries moved Bethel from Mamterillermiut to its present location on the west side of the Kuskokwim River. A United States post office was opened in 1905.

In 1971, Bethel established a community radio station KYUK, the first Native-owned and -operated radio station in the U.S. Similar stations were soon started in Kotzebue, and by 1990, there were 10 stations in communities of fewer than 3,500 people.

On February 19, 1997, a school shooting attracted widespread media attention to Bethel when 16-year-old Evan Ramsey, a student at Bethel Regional High School, shot and killed his principal and one student and wounded two others, for which he later received a 210-year prison sentence.

In 2009, Bethel opted out of status as a "Local Option" community, theoretically opening the door to allowing alcohol sales in the city; residents and city officials maintained that all liquor license requests would be actively opposed. In October 2015, though, a vote for allowing alcohol sales in Bethel passed and two liquor licenses were approved for existing stores in the city.

In 2012, pranksters distributed flyers falsely announcing the launch of a Taco Bell restaurant in Bethel, prompting Taco Bell to airlift into the town a Taco Bell food truck loaded with ingredients for 10,000 tacos.

On November 3, 2015, the Kilbuck building housing both the Ayaprun Elitnaurviat Yup'ik immersion school and the Kuskokwim Learning Academy caught fire, destroying the immersion school and damaging the boarding school. Fire fighters demolished part of the building in an effort to save a media center containing Yup'ik artifacts and elder interviews.

== Geography ==
Bethel is located at 60°47′32″N 161°45′21″W (60.792222, −161.755833). According to the United States Census Bureau, the city has a total area of 48.7 square miles (126.1 km^{2}), of which 43.2 square miles (111.8 km^{2}) is land and 5.5 square miles (14.3 km^{2}), or 11.34%, is water.

Though the region is flat and generally treeless, Bethel lies inside the Yukon Delta National Wildlife Refuge, the second largest wildlife refuge in the United States.

=== Climate ===
Bethel has a subarctic climate (Köppen: "Dfc"), with long, somewhat snowy, and cold winters, and short, mild summers. Normal monthly mean temperatures range from 6.6 °F (−14.1 °C) in January to 56.1 °F (13.4 °C) in July, with an annual mean of 30.7 °F (−0.7 °C). Warm days of above 70 °F (21 °C) can be expected on 14 days per summer. Precipitation is both most frequent and greatest during the summer months, averaging 18.5 inches (470 mm) per year. Snowfall usually falls in light bouts, and is actually greater in November and December (before the sea freezes) than in January and February, averaging 45 inches (114 cm) a season. Extreme temperatures have ranged from −52 °F (−47 °C) on January 18–19 and 25, 1947 up to 90 °F (32 °C) on June 17, 1926.

Climate data for Bethel, Alaska (1991−2020 normals, extremes 1923−present)
Month	Jan	Feb	Mar	Apr	May	Jun	Jul	Aug	Sep	Oct	Nov	Dec	Year
Record high °F (°C)	49 (9)	51 (11)	53 (12)	63 (17)	80 (27)	90 (32)	89 (32)	87 (31)	76 (24)	65 (18)	60 (16)	49 (9)	90 (32)
Mean maximum °F (°C)	37.2 (2.9)	39.8 (4.3)	39.5 (4.2)	52.8 (11.6)	69.0 (20.6)	76.1 (24.5)	77.7 (25.4)	73.0 (22.8)	63.5 (17.5)	51.4 (10.8)	41.1 (5.1)	38.2 (3.4)	79.9 (26.6)
Mean daily maximum °F (°C)	12.7 (−10.7)	20.1 (−6.6)	22.0 (−5.6)	36.9 (2.7)	52.0 (11.1)	62.1 (16.7)	63.6 (17.6)	60.5 (15.8)	52.7 (11.5)	37.9 (3.3)	24.3 (−4.3)	16.3 (−8.7)	38.4 (3.6)
Daily mean °F (°C)	6.9 (−13.9)	13.3 (−10.4)	14.5 (−9.7)	29.0 (−1.7)	43.0 (6.1)	53.3 (11.8)	56.3 (13.5)	53.9 (12.2)	46.1 (7.8)	32.2 (0.1)	18.5 (−7.5)	10.0 (−12.2)	31.4 (−0.3)
Mean daily minimum °F (°C)	1.2 (−17.1)	6.5 (−14.2)	7.0 (−13.9)	21.2 (−6.0)	34.1 (1.2)	44.5 (6.9)	49.0 (9.4)	47.3 (8.5)	39.4 (4.1)	26.4 (−3.1)	12.8 (−10.7)	3.7 (−15.7)	24.4 (−4.2)
Mean minimum °F (°C)	−24.9 (−31.6)	−19.5 (−28.6)	−15.0 (−26.1)	0.6 (−17.4)	22.6 (−5.2)	35.7 (2.1)	41.9 (5.5)	38.1 (3.4)	27.9 (−2.3)	10.8 (−11.8)	−8.6 (−22.6)	−20.3 (−29.1)	−29.7 (−34.3)
Record low °F (°C)	−52 (−47)	−45 (−43)	−42 (−41)	−31 (−35)	−5 (−21)	28 (−2)	30 (−1)	28 (−2)	18 (−8)	−6 (−21)	−31 (−35)	−44 (−42)	−52 (−47)
Average precipitation inches (mm)	0.77 (20)	0.88 (22)	0.74 (19)	0.79 (20)	1.21 (31)	1.77 (45)	2.57 (65)	3.36 (85)	2.89 (73)	1.84 (47)	1.80 (46)	1.06 (27)	19.68 (500)
Average snowfall inches (cm)	9.4 (24)	8.1 (21)	8.8 (22)	6.0 (15)	1.9 (4.8)	0.0 (0.0)	0.0 (0.0)	0.0 (0.0)	0.5 (1.3)	3.9 (9.9)	13.2 (34)	12.2 (31)	64.0 (163)
Average extreme snow depth inches (cm)	11.4 (29)	12.0 (30)	11.4 (29)	9.1 (23)	0.8 (2.0)	0.0 (0.0)	0.0 (0.0)	0.0 (0.0)	0.3 (0.76)	2.1 (5.3)	6.6 (17)	11.2 (28)	17.2 (44)
Average precipitation days (≥ 0.01 in)	9.2	10.1	8.6	9.5	12.0	12.9	16.2	18.1	16.6	13.3	13.7	10.9	151.1
Average snowy days (≥ 0.1 in)	9.3	10.1	9.1	7.3	2.7	0.1	0.0	0.0	0.5	5.2	11.2	11.7	67.2
Average relative humidity (%)	76.2	73.1	77.8	79.7	76.2	75.9	80.4	84.6	83.3	83.7	81.6	76.5	79.1
Average dew point °F (°C)	0.9 (−17.3)	−0.8 (−18.2)	7.7 (−13.5)	18.1 (−7.7)	32.2 (0.1)	42.1 (5.6)	48.0 (8.9)	47.7 (8.7)	39.7 (4.3)	25.0 (−3.9)	12.4 (−10.9)	2.7 (−16.3)	23.0 (−5.0)
Source: NOAA (relative humidity and dew point 1961–1990)

== Demographics ==
Historical population
Census	Pop.	Note	%±
1880	29		—
1890	20		−31.0%
1910	110		—
1920	221		100.9%
1930	278		25.8%
1940	376		35.3%
1950	651		73.1%
1960	1,258		93.2%
1970	2,416		92.1%
1980	3,576		48.0%
1990	4,674		30.7%
2000	5,471		17.1%
2010	6,080		11.1%
2020	6,325		4.0%
2022 (est.)	6,276	▼	−0.8%
U.S. Decennial Census; 2020 Census

The first settlement at the location of Bethel reported on the 1880 U.S. Census as "Mumtrekhlagamute Station." It had 29 Yup'ik. 1/2 mile away was the adjacent Mumtrekhlagamute Village (1880 population: 41 (all Yup'ik); 1890 population (as Mumtrekhlagamiut) was 33 (28 Yup'ik and 5 Whites). Bethel was established at Mumtrekhlagamute Station in 1885 and supplanted it by the 1890 U.S. Census. It reported 20 residents (13 Yup'ik and 7 Whites). Mumtrekhlagamiut would later be absorbed into Bethel. Bethel did not appear on the 1900 Census, but has on every census since 1910. It would formally incorporate as a city in 1957.

=== 2020 census ===
As of the 2020 census, Bethel had a population of 6,325. The median age was 30.3 years. 30.2% of residents were under the age of 18 and 7.9% of residents were 65 years of age or older. For every 100 females there were 109.3 males, and for every 100 females age 18 and over there were 111.2 males age 18 and over.

80.6% of residents lived in urban areas, while 19.4% lived in rural areas.

There were 1,912 households in Bethel, of which 44.2% had children under the age of 18 living in them. Of all households, 40.6% were married-couple households, 22.9% were households with a male householder and no spouse or partner present, and 25.1% were households with a female householder and no spouse or partner present. About 24.6% of all households were made up of individuals and 5.0% had someone living alone who was 65 years of age or older.

There were 2,184 housing units, of which 12.5% were vacant. The homeowner vacancy rate was 0.7% and the rental vacancy rate was 7.8%.

Racial composition as of the 2020 census
Race	Number	Percent
White	1,207	19.1%
Black or African American	74	1.2%
American Indian and Alaska Native	4,158	65.7%
Asian	187	3.0%
Native Hawaiian and Other Pacific Islander	2	0.0%
Some other race	53	0.8%
Two or more races	644	10.2%
Hispanic or Latino (of any race)	144	2.3%

=== 2000 census ===
As of the census of 2000, there were 5,471 people, 1,741 households, and 1,190 families residing in the city. The population density was 125.0 inhabitants per square mile (48.3/km^{2}). There were 1,990 housing units at an average density of 45.5 per square mile (17.6/km^{2}). The racial makeup of the city was 26.8% White, 0.9% Black or African American, 61.8% Native American, 2.9% Asian, 0.2% Pacific Islander, 0.5% from other races, and 6.9% from two or more races. Hispanics or Latinos of any race were 1.7% of the population.

There were 1,741 households, out of which 44.1% had children under the age of 18 living with them, 42.6% were married couples living together, 15.2% had a female householder with no husband present, and 33.7% were non-families. 24.5% of all households were made up of individuals, and 3.2% had someone living alone who was 65 years of age or older. The average household size was 3.00 and the average family size was 3.65.

The age distribution was 35.5% under 18, 9.0% from 18 to 24, 32.7% from 25 to 44, 18.9% from 45 to 64, and 3.9% who were 65 or older. The median age was 29 years. For every 100 females, there were 110.4 males. For every 100 females age 18 and over, there were 109.6 males.

The median income for a household in the city was $57,321, and the median income for a family was $62,431. Males had a median income of $45,321 versus $39,010 for females. The per capita income for the city is $20,267. About 10.6% of the families and 11.2% of the population were below the poverty line, including 9.7% of those under the age of 18 and 18.3% of those ages 64 and over.

== Transportation and economy ==
The state-owned Bethel Airport is the regional transportation hub, and is served by numerous passenger carriers, including Alaska Airlines, Grant Aviation, Yute Commuter Service, and Fox Air. It also receives service from numerous major cargo operators: Everts Air Cargo, Northern Air Cargo, Lynden Air Cargo, Aloha Air Cargo, and numerous small air taxi services. The airport ranks third in the state for total number of flights. It offers a 6,400 foot (1,951-meter) asphalt runway, a 4,000 foot (1,219-meter) asphalt runway, and 1,850 foot (564-meter) gravel crosswind runway, and is currently undergoing a $7 million renovation and expansion. Three float plane bases are nearby: Hangar Lake, H Marker Lake, and the Kuskokwim River.

The Port of Bethel is the northernmost, medium-draft port in the United States. River travel is the primary means of local transportation in the summer. A Bethel-based barge service provides goods to Kuskokwim villages.

Within Bethel are approximately 16 miles (26 km) of roads that are not connected to any contiguous highway system. Winter ice roads lead to several nearby villages, but their condition varies depending on temperature and snowfall. An extensive network of snow machine trails connects Bethel to villages all over the Delta, from the Bering Sea to the Yukon.

The town's single paved road, about 10 miles (16 km), supports a taxicab industry. With 93 taxi drivers, the town has more cab drivers per capita than any other city in the US. Most local cab drivers are Albanian or South Korean immigrants.

Bethel has the lone detention center in southwestern Alaska, the Yukon Kuskokwim Correction Center. This prison has the capacity to hold 207 incarcerated people of any gender, and a staff of 45.

Bethel is also the site of a unique 8.5-mile (13.7 km) prototype single-wire earth return electrical intertie to Napakiak, Alaska, constructed in 1981.

== Education ==
Lower Kuskokwim School District (LKSD) operates five schools in Bethel:

- Gladys Jung Elementary School - Bethel
  - Jung, previously known as the Kilbuck School, serves grades 3–6. As of 2018 its enrollment was about 345.
- Mekelnguut Elitnauriviat School - Bethel
  - Nicknamed the "M.E. School," it serves grades Kindergarten through 2. As of 2018 it has 260 students and 18 teachers.
- Ayaprun Elitnaurvik School - Bethel
  - It is a K-8 (K-6 prior to 2022) Yup'ik-English bilingual program that originated from a total immersion language program established in 1995. As of 2002, the school had 197 students. The school occupied space in Mekelnguut Elitnauriviat and Gladys Jung schools, with kindergarten and 1st grade in the former and the other grades are in the latter.
  - In 2015, the buildings that housed Ayaprun Elitnaurvik and Kuskokwim both burned down. Students were sent to other schools in the district before moving into a former grocery store for the 2016-2024 school years. At the beginning of the 2024-2025 school year, students and teachers were finally able to have class in their new school building.
  - The school expanded to include 7th and 8th grades at the beginning of the 2022-2023 school year.
  - For 2023-2024, there were 184 students and 12 teachers.
- Bethel Regional High School - Bethel
  - Known locally as "Bethel High School", it serves grades 7–12. As of 2019, there were approximately 540 students enrolled, and 34 staff members. For the 2023-2024 school year, there were 434 students enrolled with 37 teachers.
- Kuskokwim Learning Academy (alternative)

Other institutions:

- University of Alaska Fairbanks
- Yuut Elitnaurviat

== Sports and recreation ==
Bethel is home to a noted, mid-distance dogsled race, the Kuskokwim 300. Held every January since 1980, the race commemorates an early mail route that once tied the settlement to the outside world. Top mushers and hundreds of sled dogs participate in the race for a purse of $100,000, the largest offered by any 300-mile (480 km) sled dog race.

Local recreational activities include snow machining, skiing, bicycling, kayaking, caribou hunting, and salmon fishing.

Bethel is an established starting point to Float Alaska wilderness rivers in the Kisaralik, Kwethluk, Aniak, Kanektok, Arolik, Goodnews, Eek and Holitna River systems.

== Arts and culture ==
Traditional dancers from all over Alaska and beyond participate every March in the Cama-i dance festival. Hundreds of costumed dancers, drummers, and singers perform traditional Yup'ik story dances during the three-day festival, sponsored by the Bethel Council on the Arts. "Cama-i" (pronounced Cha-Mai) translates as "a warm hello."

The Yupiit Piciryarait Cultural Center also hosts a bimonthly "Saturday Market" where artisans and crafters from the Yukon Kuskokwim Delta come to sell their crafts. There is a variety at the market, but many of the crafts include traditional Yup'ik qaspeq, story knives, woven baskets, ulu knives and more.

== Health care ==
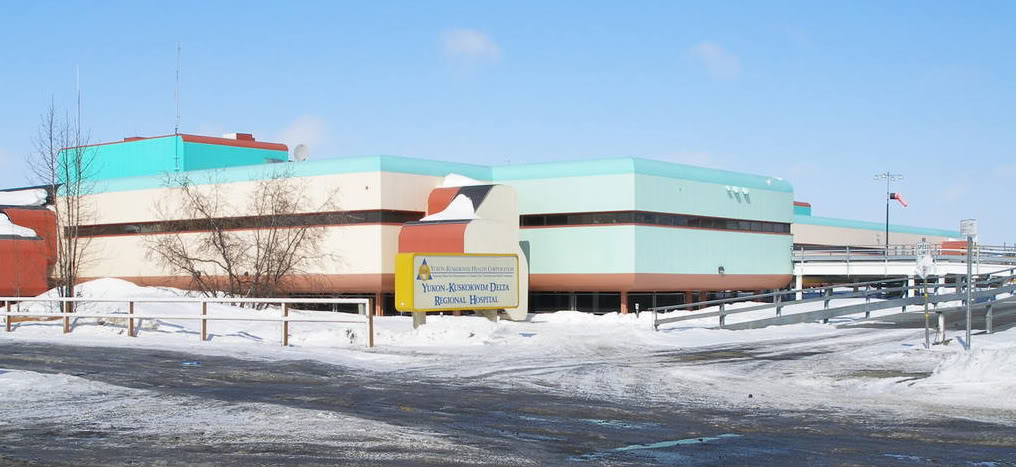
Yukon-Kuskokwim Delta Regional Hospital in Bethel, Alaska

Bethel and the smaller communities surrounding it are primarily served by Yukon-Kuskokwim Delta Regional Hospital, a 50-bed general acute care medical facility. Services located in the hospital include an adult medical-surgical ward, a pediatric ward, an obstetric ward, as well as outpatient family medicine clinics, an emergency room, pharmacy, lab, X-ray, and specialty clinics. The facility is accessible by road for those individuals living in or visiting the city of Bethel. Depending on weather and the season, road access to the hospital may also be available to some of the surrounding communities. If not, individuals must be airlifted into the facility via helicopter or air ambulance. Also, there are five sub-regional primary care clinics located in some of the more remote and less populated cities neighboring Bethel (Emmonak, St. Mary's, Aniak, Toksook Bay, and Hooper Bay). Many of the services found at the hospital in Bethel are also available at these sub-regional clinics, such as urgent care, diagnostic review, physical exams, prenatal care, minor surgery, laboratory tests, X-rays, and distribution of medications. The hospital, sub-regional clinics, and additional village clinics are all part of Yukon-Kuskokwim Health Corporation.

== Media ==
Bethel has a public television station, KYUK-LD, and three radio stations, public KYUK, private, non-profit KYKD, and commercial KEDI. Since the founding of its community radio station in 1970, the media has become part of Yup'ik development in southwest Alaska and important to the people's self-definition. The city is also home to the weekly regional newspapers Delta Discovery and Tundra Drums.

== Sister City ==
Bethel has one official sister city.

- Anadyr, Chukotka Autonomous Okrug, Russia

== Notable people ==
- John Binkley (born 1953), businessman, Republican politician
- Valerie Davidson (born 1967), politician
- Nora Guinn (1920–2005), judge
- Lyman Hoffman (born 1950), politician
- Peter Kaiser (born 1987), musher
- Oscar Kawagley (1934–2011), anthropologist, teacher, actor
- Richard LaFortune (Anguksuar), Two spirit, language revitalization and social justice activist
- Marie Meade (born 1947), dancer
- Don Page (born 1948), physicist; noted for being a doctoral student of Stephen Hawking
- Eugene "Buzzy" Peltola (1965–2023), politician
- Mary Sattler Peltola (born 1973), politician
- Tiffany Zulkosky (born 1984), politician
