= KRNN =

Coordinates: 58.285°N 134.430°W

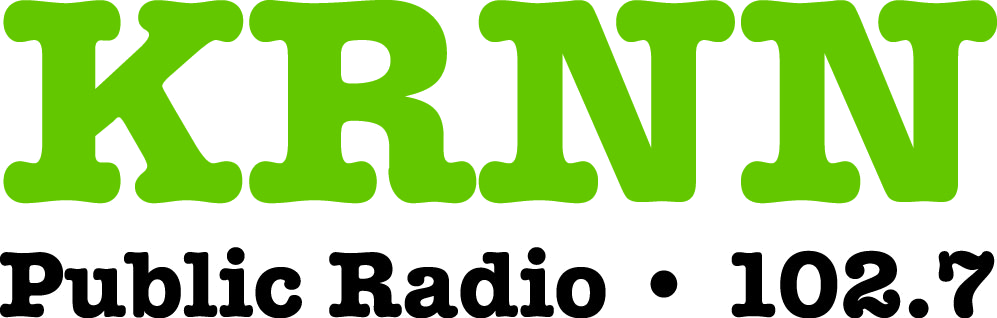

Juneau, Alaska; United States
- Broadcast area: Juneau, Alaska
- Frequency: 102.7 MHz (HD Radio)
- Branding: Rain Country Radio

Programming
- Format: Variety

Ownership
- Owner: Capital Community Broadcasting, Inc.

Technical information
- Licensing authority: FCC
- Facility ID: 17049
- Class: A
- ERP: 6,000 watts
- HAAT: -127 meters
- Translator: 103.1 K276AF (Mendenhall Valley)

Links
- Public license information: Public file; LMS
- Webcast: Listen Live
- Website: ktoo.org/category/krnn/

KRNN is a non-commercial National Public Radio (NPR) member music radio station in Juneau, Alaska, broadcasting on 102.7 FM. KRNN airs a variety of music genres which include, jazz, classical, and adult album alternative.

== History ==
Capital Community Broadcasting purchased KSRJ and KFMG from White Oak Broadcasting of Alaska in 2006.
