= KXLL =

Coordinates: 58.285°N 134.430°W

- Juneau, Alaska; United States
- Broadcast area: Juneau, Alaska
- Frequency: 100.7 MHz (HD Radio)
- Branding: Excellent Radio

Programming
- Format: Adult Album Alternative/ Modern Rock Hybrid

Ownership
- Owner: Capital Community Broadcasting, Inc.

Technical information
- Licensing authority: FCC
- Facility ID: 31000
- Class: A
- ERP: 6,000 watts
- HAAT: -127 meters

Links
- Public license information: Public file; LMS
- Webcast: Listen Live
- Website: www.ktoo.org/category/kxll/

KXLL is a non-commercial adult album alternative/modern rock hybrid music radio station in Juneau, Alaska, broadcasting on 100.7 FM.

== History ==
Capital Community Broadcasting, Inc. purchased KXLL and KSRJ from White Oak Broadcasting of Alaska in 2006.

== History of call letters ==
The call letters KXLL previously were used by an AM station in Missoula, Montana. It operated on 1450 kHz with 250 W power (unlimited).
