= Alaska Public Media =

Operator of public broadcasting stations in Alaska

Alaska Public Media Inc
- Formation: Tax-exempt since September 1974; 51 years ago
- Type: 501(c)(3)
- Headquarters: Anchorage
- Revenue: 7,369,586 USD (2024)
- Expenses: 8,247,414 USD (2024)
- Website: alaskapublic.org

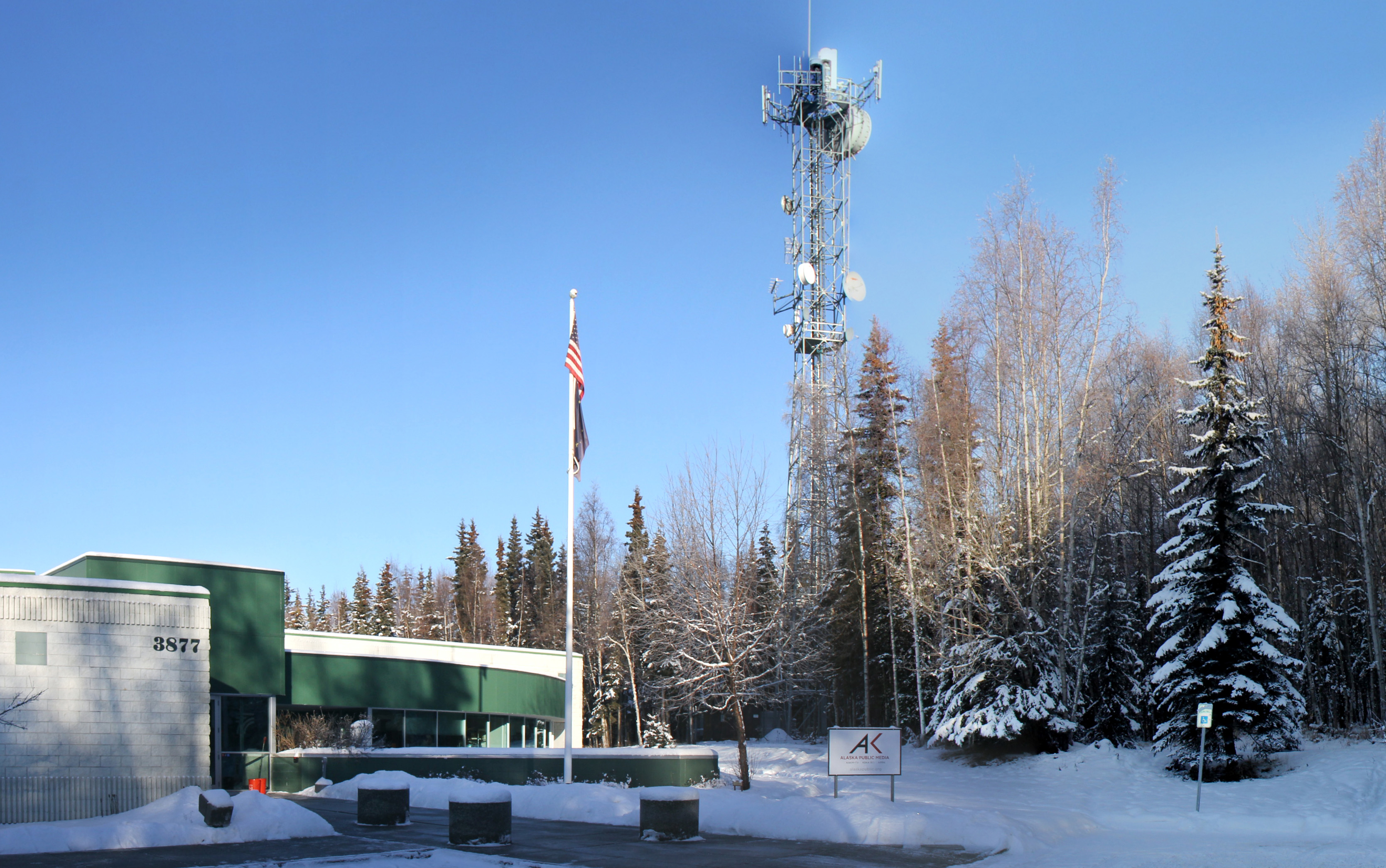
Alaska Public Media's station in Anchorage, Alaska at 3877 University Drive

Alaska Public Media is an American non-profit organization in U.S. state of Alaska, with member television and radio stations that are part of PBS, NPR and other public broadcasting networks. Formerly known as Alaska Public Telecommunications, Inc., it relies upon several funding sources, including member donations, state and federal funding, and grants from private foundations, the Corporation for Public Broadcasting (CPB), and other organizations.

Alaska Public Media operates KAKM, a television station affiliated with PBS, along with public radio station KSKA (91.1 FM). Alaska Public Media also operates the Statewide News, formerly known as Alaska Public Radio Network (APRN), a network of more than 25 radio stations in Alaska that share news and other audio content statewide; as well as Alaska's omnibus television network, the Alaska Rural Communications Service, which is a joint venture of Alaska Public Media and Alaska's public broadcasters.

The stations claim 54,000 TV viewers nightly and 37,000 radio listeners weekly in the south-central Alaska region. Alaska Public Television is viewed statewide except in the Fairbanks area, which is served by KUAC-TV as a locally-focused PBS station.

== History ==
Alaska Public Media started life as KAKM channel 7 (Alaska Public Television, INC) signing on the air on May 7, 1975 at 7:07pm at the Consortium Library. The station soon outgrew their studios and with effort from then general manager Elmo Sackett had their new permanent location constructed on the Alaska Methodist University campus (today known as Alaska Pacific University). Later named the Elmo Sackett Broadcast Center. KSKA, having lived on the APU campus in Grant Hall since it went on the air in 1978 had previously expressed interest in moving into this location but didn't put any major effort into its construction; it would be later in 1993 after the building had completed its construction that they moved forward with the merger. In 2004, Alaska Public Radio Network (APRN) merged with APTI.

KSKA first signed on 103.1 MHz at 3,000 W under Aurora Community Broadcasting on August 15, 1978. In 1980, KSKA moved to 91.1 MHz and increased its power to 36,000 W, then finally increasing its power level to 100,000 W in 1998. In 2007 KSKA started broadcasting in HD, but later discontinued it due to its costs. KSKA's new transmitter is capable of doing HD broadcasts, but it is unknown if or when they will start up its HD signal again.

KAKM operated as a separate public television station until 2011 when AlaskaOne's board (Alaska Public Broadcasting Service) voted to move operations from KUAC in Fairbanks to KAKM in Anchorage. There are references that KAKM contributed to the "Public Television Network of Alaska" but KAKM was never part of AlaskaOne. KTOO and KYUK later merged operations with KAKM to form Alaska Public Television.

In 2020 Alaska Public Media took operational control of ARCS (Alaska Rural Communications Service) from Alaska Public Broadcasting, INC. The State of Alaska owns the licenses and holds the contract to the satellite uplink to the translator network of 150+ different locations around the state. Despite the Dunleavy administration cutting funding to public media in the state, funding remains for ARCS.

From 1976 to 2023, Alaska Public Media and the National Weather Service produced Alaska Weather, a metrological broadcast that was transmitted through ARCS.

Alaska Public Media TV shows include the public affairs show Alaska Insight and short video showcase Indie Alaska.
