= Mass media in Anchorage, Alaska =

Anchorage is a major center of media in Alaska. The following is a list of media outlets based in the city.

== Print ==
=== Newspapers ===
The Anchorage Daily News is the city's primary newspaper, published daily. Other papers published in the city include:

- Alaska Journal of Commerce, business, weekly
- Anchorage Press, alternative newspaper, weekly
- Bristol Bay Times, Southwest Alaska news, weekly
- Dutch Harbor Fisherman, Aleutian and Pribilof Islands news, weekly
- The Northern Light, University of Alaska Anchorage student newspaper, weekly

== Radio ==
The following is a list of radio stations licensed to and/or broadcasting from Anchorage.

=== AM ===
Frequency	Callsign	Format	City of License	Notes
550	KTZN	Sports	Anchorage, Alaska	Fox Sports Radio
590	KHAR	Soft Oldies	Anchorage, Alaska	-
650	KENI	News/Talk	Anchorage, Alaska	-
700	KBYR	Talk	Anchorage, Alaska	-
750	KFQD	News/Talk	Anchorage, Alaska	-
1020	KVNT	News/Talk	Eagle River, Alaska	Broadcasts from Anchorage
1080	KOAN	Spanish music	Anchorage, Alaska	-

=== FM ===
Frequency	Callsign	Format	City of License	Notes
88.1	KRUA	Alternative	Anchorage, Alaska	University of Alaska Anchorage college radio
88.5	KAKL	Contemporary Christian	Anchorage, Alaska	K-Love
89.3	KATB	Religious	Anchorage, Alaska	-
90.3	KNBA	Adult Album Alternative	Anchorage, Alaska	-
91.1	KSKA	Public radio	Anchorage, Alaska	NPR
92.1	KBBO-FM	Adult Hits	Houston, Alaska	Bob FM; Broadcasts from Anchorage
92.9	KFAT	Rhythmic Contemporary	Anchorage, Alaska	-
93.7	KAFC	Contemporary Christian	Anchorage, Alaska	-
94.7	KZND-FM	Alternative Rock	Houston, Alaska	Broadcasts from Anchorage
95.5	KNLT	AAA	Palmer, Alaska	
96.3	KXLW	Country	Houston, Alaska	Broadcasts from Anchorage
96.7	K244EG	Soft Oldies	Anchorage, Alaska	Translator of KHAR
97.3	KEAG	Classic Hits	Anchorage, Alaska	-
98.1	KLEF	Classical	Anchorage, Alaska	-
98.9	KYMG	Adult Contemporary	Anchorage, Alaska	-
99.7	KMBQ-FM	Adult Contemporary	Wasillia, Alaska	-
100.5	KBFX	Classic Rock	Anchorage, Alaska	-
101.3	KGOT	Top 40 (CHR)	Anchorage, Alaska	-
102.1	KRAK	Classic Hits	Anchorage, Alaska	-
103.1	KMXS	Hot Adult Contemporary	Anchorage, Alaska	-
103.7	K279BG	News/Talk	Anchorage, Alaska	Translator of KFQD
104.1	KBRJ	Country	Anchorage, Alaska	-
104.9	KYKA	Worship music	Meadow Lakes, Alaska	Air1
105.7	KMVN	Rhythmic Adult Contemporary	Anchorage, Alaska	-
106.5	KWHL	Active Rock	Anchorage, Alaska	-
107.5	KASH-FM	Country	Anchorage, Alaska	-

== Television ==
The Anchorage television market includes Anchorage, Matanuska-Susitna Borough, and Kenai Peninsula Borough. In its Fall 2013 ranking of television markets by population, Arbitron ranked the Anchorage market 146th in the United States.

The following is a list of television stations that broadcast from and/or are licensed to Anchorage.

Display Channel	Network	Callsign	City of License	Notes
2.1	NBC (Cable 2)	KTUU-TV	Anchorage, Alaska	-
2.2	Heroes & Icons	KTUU-TV	Anchorage, Alaska	-
2.3	Start TV	KTUU-TV	Anchorage, Alaska	-
2.4	True Crime Network	KTUU-TV	Anchorage, Alaska	-
4.1	FOX (Cable 4)	KTBY	Anchorage, Alaska	-
4.2	Dabl	KTBY	Anchorage, Alaska	-
4.3	Cozi TV	KTBY	Anchorage, Alaska	-
4.4	Ion Plus	KTBY	Anchorage, Alaska	-
4.5	Ion Television	KTBY	Anchorage, Alaska	-
4.6	Scripps News	KTBY	Anchorage, Alaska	-
5.1	CBS (Cable 5)	KAUU	Anchorage, Alaska	-
5.2	Antenna TV	KAUU	Anchorage, Alaska	-
5.3	Outlaw	KAUU	Anchorage, Alaska	-
5.4	MyNetworkTV	KAUU	Anchorage, Alaska	-
5.5	365BLK	KAUU	Anchorage, Alaska	-
5.6	Ion Mystery	KAUU	Anchorage, Alaska	-
7.1	PBS (Cable 7)	KAKM	Anchorage, Alaska	-
7.2	Create	KAKM	Anchorage, Alaska	-
7.3	360 North	KAKM	Anchorage, Alaska	-
7.4	PBS Kids	KAKM	Anchorage, Alaska	-
11.1	PBS (Cable 11)	KTVA	Anchorage, Alaska	-
11.2	Create	KTVA	Anchorage, Alaska	-
11.3	360 North	KTVA	Anchorage, Alaska	-
11.4	PBS Kids	KTVA	Anchorage, Alaska	-
13.1	ABC (Cable 13)	KYUR	Anchorage, Alaska	-
13.2	CW (Cable 3)	KYUR	Anchorage, Alaska	-
13.3	Fox (via KTBY on cable 4)	KYUR	Anchorage, Alaska	-
31	TBN	KLDY-LD	Anchorage, Alaska	-
33.1	ION	KDMD	Anchorage, Alaska	-
33.2	Fun Roads	KDMD	Anchorage, Alaska	-
33.3	MeTV	KDMD	Anchorage, Alaska	-
33.4	Grit	KDMD	Anchorage, Alaska	-
33.5	NewsNet	KDMD	Anchorage, Alaska	-
33.6	Court TV	KDMD	Anchorage, Alaska	-
33.7	Laff	KDMD	Anchorage, Alaska	-
33.8	Movies!	KDMD	Anchorage, Alaska	-
33.9	Catchy Comedy	KDMD	Anchorage, Alaska	-
35.1	FamilyNet (Cable 19)	KCFT-CD	Anchorage, Alaska	-
35.2	-	KCFT-CD	Anchorage, Alaska	Rebroadcasts KATB (audio only)
35.3	-	KCFT-CD	Anchorage, Alaska	Rebroadcasts KAFC (audio only)
35.4	-	KCFT-CD	Anchorage, Alaska	Rebroadcasts KVNT (News/Talk audio)
45	-	K45HQ	Anchorage, Alaska	-
