= Mass media in Fairbanks, Alaska =

Fairbanks is a center of media in central Alaska. The following is a list of media outlets based in the city.

== Print ==
=== Newspapers ===
The Fairbanks Daily News-Miner is the city's primary newspaper, published daily. In addition, the University of Alaska Fairbanks publishes a weekly student newspaper, The Sun Star.

== Radio ==
The following is a list of radio stations licensed to and/or broadcasting from Fairbanks.

=== AM ===
Frequency	Callsign	Format	City of License	Notes
660	KFAR	News/Talk	Fairbanks, Alaska	-
820	KCBF	Sports	Fairbanks, Alaska	ESPN Radio
970	KFBX	News/Talk	Fairbanks, Alaska	-

=== FM ===
Frequency	Callsign	Format	City of License	Notes
88.3	KZLR	Christian Contemporary	Fairbanks, Alaska	K-LOVE
88.7	K204GE	Spanish Religious	Fairbanks, Alaska	Radio Nueva Vida
89.1	KRFF (FM)	Native American music	Fairbanks, Alaska	Athabascan music, culture, and traditions
89.9	KUAC	Public radio	Fairbanks, Alaska	NPR
91.5	KSUA	Alternative rock	Fairbanks, Alaska	Student run college radio
92.7	KQHE	Catholic Religious	Fairbanks, Alaska	-
93.5	KDJF	Country	Ester, Alaska	Broadcasts from Fairbanks
94.3	KWDD	Country	Fairbanks, Alaska	-
95.9	KXLR	Active Rock	Fairbanks, Alaska	-
96.9	KYSC	Classic Rock	Fairbanks, Alaska	-
98.1	KWLF	Contemporary Hit Radio	Fairbanks, Alaska	-
101.1	KAKQ-FM	Hot Adult Contemporary	Fairbanks, Alaska	-
102.5	KIAK-FM	Country	Fairbanks, Alaska	-
103.9	KTDZ	Adult Hits	College, Alaska	Broadcasts from Fairbanks
104.7	KKED	Alternative Rock	Fairbanks, Alaska	-
105.9	KDFJ-LP	Religious	Fairbanks, Alaska	-

== Television ==
The Fairbanks television market includes all of Fairbanks North Star Borough, the western half of Southeast Fairbanks Census Area, and a portion of southern Yukon–Koyukuk Census Area. In its Fall 2013 ranking of television markets by population, Arbitron ranked the Fairbanks market 202nd in the United States.

The following is a list of television stations that broadcast from and/or are licensed to Fairbanks.

Display Channel	Network	Callsign	City of License	Notes
2.1	ABC	KATN	Fairbanks, Alaska	-
2.2	CW	KATN	Fairbanks, Alaska	-
4.1	TBN	KJNP-TV	Fairbanks, Alaska	-
4.2	Worship	KJNP-TV	Fairbanks, Alaska	-
9.1	PBS	KUAC-TV	Fairbanks, Alaska	-
9.2	World	KUAC-TV	Fairbanks, Alaska	-
9.3	Create	KUAC-TV	Fairbanks, Alaska	-
9.4	-	KUAC-TV	Fairbanks, Alaska	University of Alaska Fairbanks Television
9.5	PBS Kids	KUAC-TV	Fairbanks, Alaska	-
9.6	-	KUAC-TV	Fairbanks, Alaska	Simulcast of KUAC-FM (audio only)
9.7	-	KUAC-TV	Fairbanks, Alaska	Simulcast of KUAC-FM2 (audio only)
9.8	-	KUAC-TV	Fairbanks, Alaska	Simulcast of KUAC-FM3 (audio only)
11.1	NBC	KTVF	Fairbanks, Alaska	-
11.2	NBC	KTVF	Fairbanks, Alaska	-
13.1	CBS	KXDF-CD	Fairbanks, Alaska	-
32	ION	KDMD-LP	Fairbanks, Alaska	-
