= KUWL (Alaska) =

Radio station in Fairbanks, Alaska (1985–1993)

- Fairbanks, Alaska; United States
- Frequency: 91.5 MHz

Programming
- Format: Contemporary Christian music

Ownership
- Owner: Fairbanks Educational Broadcasting Foundation

History
- First air date: October 10, 1985; 40 years ago
- Last air date: January 15, 1993; 33 years ago

Technical information
- Facility ID: 20445
- ERP: 3,000 watts
- HAAT: 48 feet (15 m)
- Transmitter coordinates: 64°52′05″N 147°39′48″W

KUWL (91.5 FM) was a Christian radio station in Fairbanks, Alaska, United States. It broadcast from 1985 to 1993, closing due to insufficient financial support from its listeners. After being silent, the KUWL license was then sold to Borealis Broadcasting, which in turn traded it to the University of Alaska Fairbanks to relocate KSUA in exchange for the rights to the 103.9 frequency, which used the KUWL call letters from 1996 to 2006.

== History ==
KUWL began broadcasting October 10, 1985. It was owned by the Fairbanks Educational Broadcasting Foundation, and its studios were located at the Lighthouse Christian Center on Kniffen Drive; Fairbanks Educational was independent of Lighthouse but shared directors. It was the first station to operate below 100 MHz in Fairbanks; in Alaska, the lower 12 MHz of the FM band, including what in the rest of the United States was the entire noncommercial educational reserved band, was not available for sound broadcasting until 1982, as it had been allocated to other fixed services before the Alaska Public Broadcasting Commission reached a deal to give broadcasting primary status over rural communications uses in that spectrum. KUWL offered listeners contemporary Christian and easy listening music, as well as CNN Radio news.

Despite its small size, KUWL showed itself to be on the bleeding edge of radio technology; the station billed itself as just one of five in the United States who had switched to playing out all music from Digital Audio Tape by 1989. The move was made because DAT hardware interfaced with accessible equipment used by blind announcer Mike Nafpliotis, whereas previous tape decks required sight to operate.

Throughout its history, KUWL failed to generate sufficient revenues and listener support. As a result, Lighthouse Christian Center paid expenses for seven years, far longer than the two years originally envisioned when the station began broadcasting in 1985. The station went off the air January 15, 1993, and issued one final plea for $70,000 to return to the air.

By 1995, Borealis Broadcasting, owners of KFAR and KWLF, had obtained an option to buy the KUWL license. However, because KUWL broadcast in the reserved band, it could not be used to operate a commercial radio station. However, one group had a license that could: KSUA at the University of Alaska Fairbanks, which had operated on a commercial basis from 1984 to a financial collapse in 1993. In August 1995, Borealis and the university struck a license trade. Borealis got the commercial KSUA license; in exchange, the university received the KUWL license at 91.5, a new antenna and transmitter system valued at $26,000, and $10,000 in additional payments—all extremely valuable in the face of budget cuts. The call signs on 103.9 and 91.5 FM switched on April 26, 1996; the KUWL license is the current home of KSUA, while the 103.9 frequency became a commercial country music station, known as "Cool".
