= KAYO (FM) =

Radio station in Wasilla, Alaska

- Wasilla, Alaska; United States
- Broadcast area: Mat-Su Valley
- Frequency: 100.9 MHz
- Branding: Classic Country 100.9

Programming
- Format: Classic country
- Affiliations: Westwood One

Ownership
- Owner: Connoisseur Media; (Alpha Media Licensee LLC)
- Sister stations: KBRJ; KEAG; KFQD; KHAR; KMXS; KWHL

History
- First air date: 2009

Technical information
- Licensing authority: FCC
- Facility ID: 165988
- Class: C2
- ERP: 50,000 watts
- HAAT: −84 meters (−276 ft)
- Transmitter coordinates: 61°38′19.1″N 149°0′4″W

Links
- Public license information: Public file; LMS
- Webcast: Listen live
- Website: www.classiccountry1009.com

KAYO is a classic country formatted broadcast radio station licensed to Wasilla, Alaska, serving the Mat-Su Valley. KAYO is owned and operated by Connoisseur Media. Its studios are located in Anchorage (two blocks west of Dimond Center), and its transmitter is in Lazy Mountain, Alaska.
