= KENI Radio Building =

- U.S. National Register of Historic Places
- Alaska Heritage Resources Survey
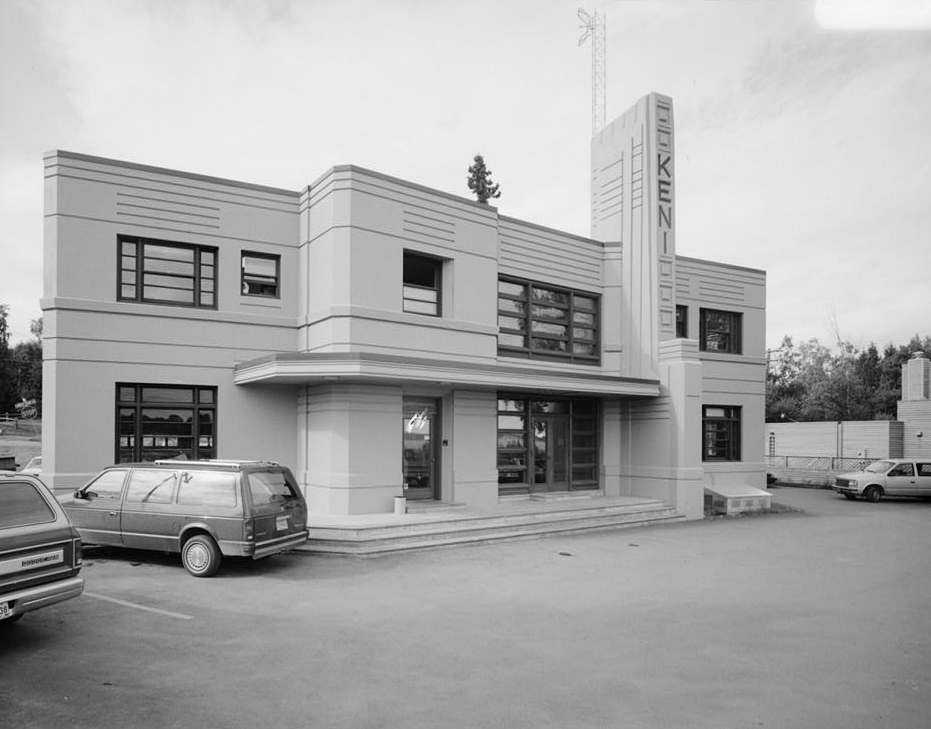
- The building in 1991

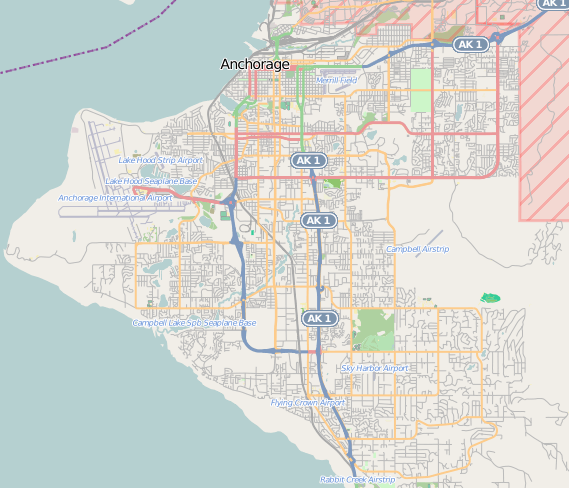
- Location within Anchorage Location within Alaska
- Location: 1777 Forest Park Drive, Anchorage, Alaska
- Coordinates: 61°12′19″N 149°55′31″W
- Area: less than 1 acre
- Built: 1948
- Built by: Al Swalling
- Architect: Augustine A. Porreca
- Architectural style: Art Deco
- NRHP reference No.: 88000380
- AHRS No.: ANC-361
- Added to NRHP: April 18, 1988

The KENI Radio Building is an Art Moderne building in Anchorage, Alaska, designed by architect Augustine A. Porreca and completed in 1948. The building housed KENI AM, the second radio station in Anchorage, and was where musician hosted his self-titled Whitey Pullen Show.

The reinforced concrete two-story building was owned by Cap Lathrop, who had worked with Porreca on Lathrop's Fourth Avenue Theatre. Besides radio station facilities, the building also housed three apartments.

The building was purchased by Gregory Carr in the late 1990s, after the radio station moved to the Dimond Center, and converted into a private residence.
