= Lathrop Building =

Lathrop Building may refer to:

- Lathrop Building (Fairbanks, Alaska), former home of the Fairbanks Daily News-Miner, formerly owned by Austin E. Lathrop
- Lathrop Building (Anchorage, Alaska), housing the Fourth Avenue Theatre, radio and television stations owned by Lathrop
