= KBFX =

KBFX may refer to:

- KBFX-CD, a television station (channel 29) licensed to serve Bakersfield, California, United States
- KBFX (FM), a radio station (100.5 FM) licensed to Anchorage, Alaska, United States
