= KSUA =

Radio station at the University of Alaska Fairbanks

- Fairbanks, Alaska; United States
- Broadcast area: Interior Alaska
- Frequency: 91.5 MHz
- Branding: KSUA 91.5 College

Programming
- Language: English
- Format: Modern rock
- Affiliations: Pacifica Radio

Ownership
- Owner: University of Alaska, Fairbanks

History
- First air date: September 6, 1984
- Former frequencies: 103.9 MHz
- Call sign meaning: Students of the University of Alaska

Technical information
- Licensing authority: FCC
- Facility ID: 20445
- Class: A
- ERP: 3,000 watts
- HAAT: -5.0 meters
- Transmitter coordinates: 64°51′32.00″N 147°49′41.00″W

Links
- Public license information: Public file; LMS
- Webcast: Listen live
- Website: www.ksuaradio.com

KSUA (91.5 FM) is a student-run college radio station licensed to Fairbanks, Alaska. Broadcasting from the University of Alaska Fairbanks (UAF) campus with 3,000 watts effective radiated power (ERP,) it serves the Alaska Interior area. When first on the air in 1984, it was one of a few commercially licensed college stations. Reorganized in 1993, KSUA now operates under the FCC non-commercial educational license public radio rules.

== FCC Programming Requirements ==
Noncommercial licenses are available only for "educational" purposes. TV stations must show that the licenses will be used "primarily to serve the educational needs of the community; for the advancement of educational programs; and to furnish a nonprofit and noncommercial television broadcast service." This includes transmitting "educational, cultural, and entertainment programs." FM radio licensees must be nonprofit educational organizations that advance "an educational program."

In practice, though, the FCC has allowed the stations to determine for themselves whether they have produced programming of this sort. The commission has intentionally left "educational programming" undefined, describing public broadcasting instead in terms of what it is not: Public stations "are not operated by profit-seeking organizations nor supported by on-the-air advertising," with their "positive dimensions" determined by "social, political, and economic forces outside the Commission."

Because noncommercial stations have an educational mission, whose contours have been left unspecified, the FCC has never adopted public interest programming rules for noncommercial stations, such as requiring that a certain amount of airtime be dedicated to local news KSUA has won statewide and national broadcasting awards.

== History ==
KSUA-FM did not go on the air until the mid-1980s, but the station's roots stretch back for two decades before that, to the first UAF radio station, KUAC-FM. KUAC, the Fairbanks North Star Borough's public radio station, went on the air October 1, 1962, operating out of the Constitution Hall studios KSUA now occupies. KUAC was the first public radio station in Alaska, and also the first FM station serving the Interior. It would blaze the trail for other stations to come. In 1971, KUAC moved its radio and new TV broadcasting facilities into the lower level of the UAF Fine Arts Building.

KUAC was joined a decade later by carrier current outlet KMPS, the precursor to KSUA. Established by the UAF student government, KMPS went on air March 24, 1971. It was a "Progressive rock" campus radio station. The existing AC electoral wiring in the dorms and other campus buildings were used as a broadcast antenna; only AM radios near the buildings could receive its signal.

KMPS quickly tired of its limited listener base. In the mid-1970s, the push to become a licensed on-air broadcaster began. For that, a new call sign would be needed. Unlicensed carrier current stations have no claim on or requirement for a call sign, and in 1978, the FCC assigned the KMPS-FM call sign to a station based in Seattle, Washington.

== Commercial years ==
On September 6, 1984, KSUA-FM came on the air at the frequency of 103.9 MHz, operating under a commercial broadcast license from the FCC. Both KMPS and KSUA took in advertising revenue. The licensee was called Student Media, Inc. (SMI). That nonprofit corporation had been formed to operate the station.

Playing what is referred to in the radio industry as the "album-oriented rock" or AOR format (focusing on 'deep albums tracks' in addition to more popular singles), KSUA-FM began as one of the few commercial college stations in the country, as are WHUR-FM at Howard University and WPGU at the University of Illinois at Urbana-Champaign. The early KSUA operated with relative autonomy, with few direct ties to the university, as a culture had existed since the 1940s at UAF of providing student services independent of the university.

KSUA "Rock for the Great Land" quickly became the most popular station in the Greater Fairbanks area, with a format of playing a wide range of music that included classic rock, Alternative, Heavy Metal, Industrial, traditional Chicago and Delta Blues, Grunge (well before the genre became widely recognized) and a host of Independent recording acts. The format and content of each show was left largely up to the DJ of that show. The station served as a launching pad for 'Glenner and Jerry' (aka Glen Anderson and Jerry Evans), popular local announcers who enlivened the morning show format in Fairbanks. They would leave the station in 1987 for KWLF in Fairbanks. In 2013 they still worked in local radio but at different stations. D.J. Jamie Canfield, went on to work for several independent record labels including Rounder Records, Rykodisc and Righteous Babe Records, voice work for several Rockstar Games, including Grand Theft Auto Vice City, and in 2011, he was program director at KSKI-FM in Hailey, Idaho.

KSUA's fortunes began to decline in the late 1980s. In 1987, commercial contemporary hit radio station KWLF began broadcasting; it then hired away Anderson and Evans. With new competition and decline of the Alaskan economy during the same period, KSUA's stability as a commercial radio entity diminished. As Fairbanks's radio market expanded with more new stations in the early 1990s, acute financial troubles began to plague KSUA. The station's advertising revenues steadily declined amidst an increasingly competitive broadcasting landscape. KSUA was eventually unable to meet its payroll demands to both management and on-air staff. The formerly-paid DJs were asked to volunteer, but in protest, one of them filed a wage claim with the Department of Labor, and KSUA was forced to give out almost $45,000 in unpaid wages. Out of money, KSUA went dark March 8, 1993.

== Transformation, transition, and growth ==
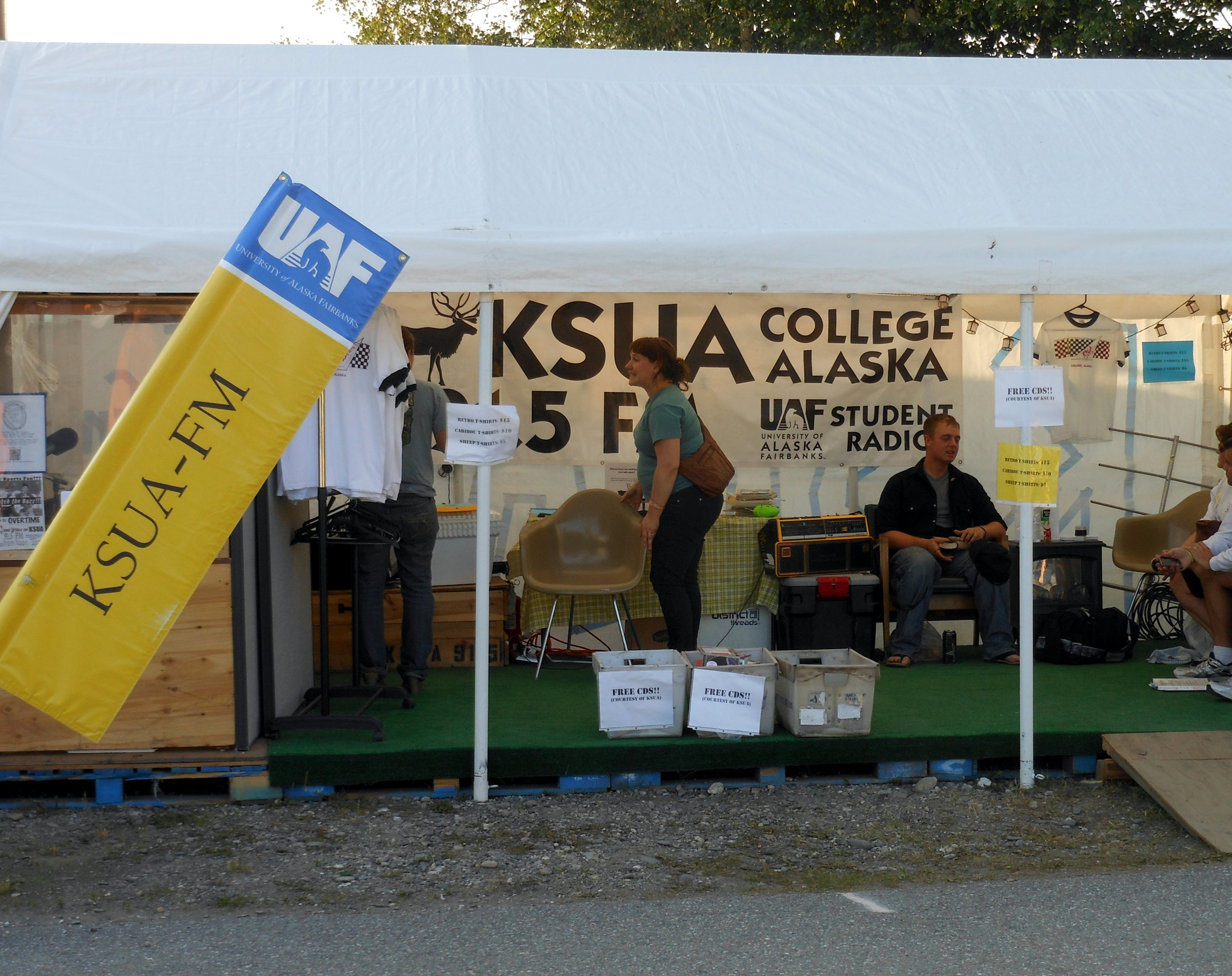
KSUA booth at the 2012 Tanana Valley State Fair.

The station stayed off the air until the end of 1993. During its downtime, SMI was dissolved, and the license for KSUA was transferred to the UA Board of Regents, to be held in trust for the students of UAF. In September the Associated Students University of Alaska Fairbanks (ASUAF) bill, called "Governance Agreement For The KSUA Media Board", was passed. It recreated KSUA as a public radio station, under the authority of the new KSUA Media Board. The station's chief engineer brought the system up to FCC standards. A new antenna was purchased, placed on the Moore Residence Hall on the Upper Campus. When KSUA came back on the air, it had new equipment and new management. The new KSUA came back on the air December 2, 1993, playing the same song the station had shut down with: Pearl Jam's "Alive."

Until 1982—just years before KSUA went on air—the portion of the FM band below 100 MHz, including the typical noncommercial educational reserved band of 88–92 MHz, was reserved in Alaska for telecommunications purposes. As a result, KSUA and KUAC, as well as other public radio stations in Alaska such as KSKA, operated on licenses that, if sold, could be converted to commercial operation. With KSUA now operating as a public radio station, Borealis Broadcasting, a local media company wanted its frequency for a new commercial station. Borealis purchased the defunct KUWL, a Christian radio station that had operated at 91.5 FM from 1985 to 1993, and swapped it to the university for the 103.9 frequency, which could be operated commercially. In exchange, the university received a new antenna and transmitter system valued at $26,000, as well as $10,000 in additional payments—all extremely valuable in the face of budget cuts. As a result, in April 1996, KSUA moved to 91.5 FM, and Borealis started a new commercial station, also named KUWL, at 103.9 with the former KSUA license.

== Sports ==
KSUA provides live play-by-play coverage of University of Alaska Nanooks hockey. Veteran broadcaster Bruce Cech is the play-by-play announcer for all Nanook hockey games. KSUA streams all games live on their website. KSUA is the only radio station to provide Nanook hockey game coverage as no commercial radio station throughout the Fairbanks radio market airs their games.

== General managers ==
There can be anywhere from 30 to 100 volunteers at one time, normally managed by 6-9 paid student staff members (depending on the needs at the time). These positions are normally kept for a year or two and are reviewed annually by the general manager. The general manager in turn is reviewed by the Media Board. The Media Board is a small board of volunteer UAF students and UAF staff who oversee the monthly operations of the station and the general manager. They also approve the annual budget and assist in helping the general manager make large decisions.

== Awards ==
As of Fall 2019, KSUA has won over 100 statewide broadcasting awards. In 2012 it was among the top 10 college stations nationwide competing for the MTV college radio woodie award. The next year KSUA won the College Radio Woodie Award.

Alaska Broadcasters Association Awards

Year	Category	Name	Creator
2001	Radio, Website, Student division	www.uaf.edu/ksua	Brandon Seifert, Dustin Rice
2001	Radio Commercial, Series, Student Division	KSUA Job Opportunities	Brad Weber, Jon Johnson
2001	Radio, Best Specialty Programming, Student Division	Dead Sessions	Channon Price
2001	Radio, Web Site, Student Division	www.uaf.edu/ksua	Brandon Seifert, Dustin Rice
2001	Radio Commercial, Single Entry, Student Division	Good Karma Tattoos	Brad Weber
2001	Radio, Best Spots Never Aired, Student Division	Punk Show Ad	Brad Weber
2001	Radio, Public Affairs Program, Student Division	Maieutic Radio Featuring Heln Caldicott	Ramey Wood
2001	Radio, Sports News Story, Single Entry, Student Division	The Russ Kelly Show, Sports Extra Edition	Russ Kelly
2001	Radio, Uniquely Alaskan Program, Student Division	Alaska Independence Party	H.B. Telling
2001	Radio, Promotional Item, Student Division	KSUA Watch	Ty Keltner
2002	Radio, Promotional Item, Student Division	KSUA T-Shirt	Ty Keltner, Trademark Printing
2002	Radio, Best Spot that Never Aired, Student Division	Rock Til Your Heart Bleeds	Mark Fortunato, Don Bradshaw
2002	Radio, Web Site, Student Division	www.uaf.edu/ksua	Dustin Rice
2002	Radio, Promotional Announcement, Series, Student Division	Gadjits Promotion	Matthew Little, Morgan Dufseth
2002	Radio, Radio Commercial, Single Entry, Student Division	Trademark	Allen Childs
2002	Promotional Announcement, Single Entry, Student Division	Fruit at the Fair	Susan Steinnerd, Ty Keltner
2002	Radio, Best Comedy Feature, Student Division	Live from Guelph	Ramey Wood, Jenn Neslund
2002	Radio, Public Affairs Program, Student Division	Derrick Jensen Interview	Ramey Wood
2002	Radio, Live Sports Event, Student Division	UAF vs. Ohio State	Bruce Cech, Erik Drygas
2003	Radio, Web Site, Student Division	KSUA Website	Curt Merrill
2003	Radio, Promotional Item, Student Division	The People's Radio Sticker	Curt Merrill
2003	Radio, Best Spot that Never Aired	Governor's Picnic	Isaac Paris, Chip Brookes
2003	Radio, Best Specialty Programming, Student Division	Jah is My Co-Pilot	Chip Brookes
2003	Radio Commercial, Single Entry, Student Division	Fantasyland	Isaac Paris, Ginny Tschanz
2003	Radio, Live Sports Event, Student Division	UAF Nanooks vs. UAA Seawolves	Bruce Cech, Erik Drygas
2003	Radio, Promotional Announcement, Single Entry, Student Division	Lysistrata	Isaac Paris, Chip Brookes
2003	Radio, Public Affairs Program, Student Division	Howard Zinn Interview	Colin McClung
2003	Radio, Best Uniquely Alaskan Program, Student Division	Alaskan Independent's Party	H.B. Telling
2003	Radio, Promotional Announcement Series, Student Division	Complete Discography	Isaac Paris, Chip Brookes
2004	Radio, Service to Community, Single Entry, Student Division	Voting PSA	Isaac Paris
2004	Radio, Website, Student Division	www.ksua.net	Curt Merrill, H.B. Telling, Channon Price
2004	Radio, Live Sports Event, Student Division	UAF vs. Notre Dame	Bruce Cech
2004	Radio, Promotional Item, Student Division	KSUA Bumper Sticker	Curt Merrill
2004	Radio, Public Affairs Program, Student Division	Sugar in the Raw	Kendra Calhoun, Jody Hassel
2004	Radio, Best Specialty Programming, Student Division	Jah is My Co-Pilot	Chip Brookes
2004	Radio, Public Service Announcement, Single Entry, Student Division	Literacy Council of Alaska	Isaac Paris, Rachel Garcia
2004	Radio, Uniquely Alaskan Program, Single Entry, Student Division	Alaska Independence Party	Nick Brewer, Elizabeth Smith
2004	Radio, Best Spot that never aired, Student Division	Radiohead I.D.	Chip Brookes, Isaac Paris, Shaleesha Ferrari, H.B. Telling
2004	Promotional Announcement, Single Entry, Student Division	General Manager Vacancy	Isaac Paris, Chip Brookes
2005	TV, Comedy Feature, Student Division	Star Trek, Sol Searching II, Lords of Time	Star Trek Club of Fairbanks
2005	TV, Entertainment Program, Single Entry, Student Division	STV	Shaleesha Ferrari, Dan Urquhart
2005	TV, Newscast, Student Division	UAF Weekly News	Dani Carlson, Kelsa Shilanski, Mike Lord
2005	Radio, Comedy Feature, Student Division	Fidel Castro Shops at Safeway Punk'd	Chip Brooks, Big Liza, Sally 3000, Ice Cold
2005	Radio, Radio News Program, Student Division	JRN 215 Final Project	Brian Woster, Dani Carlson, Kelsa Shilanski
2005	Radio, Live Sports Event, Student Division	UAF vs. Notre Dame	Bruce Cech, Erik Drygas
2005	Radio, Best On-Air Personality, Student Division	Dr. Nick and Mr. Smart	Nick Brewer, H.B. Telling
2005	Radio, Best Radio Show, Student Division	KSUA Talk Show	Nick Brewer, H.B. Telling
2005	Radio, Promotional Announcements Series, Student Division	Angry Young and Poor 2005	Isaac Paris, Craig Brookes
2005	Radio, Best Spot that never aired, Student Division	DJ Salt vs. DJ Pepper	Andrew Paris, Isaac Paris
2005	Radio, Promotional Item, Student Division	KSUA Robot's Radio T-Shirt	Nick Sorum, Nick Brewer
2005	TV, News Story, Student Division	Stryker Brigade	Dani Carlson
2005	TV, Public Service Announcement, Student Division	Real TV	Dan Urquhart
2005	TV, Live Sports Event, Student Division	UAF vs. Nebraska Omaha	Bruce Cech, Erik Drygas
2006	Radio, Uniquely Alaskan Program, Student Division	Radio Production Students Gone Wild	Jamie Horath, Iris Fabrizio, Mark Pavitt
2006	Radio, Live Sports Event, Student Division	UAF vs. Minnesota	Bruce Cech
2006	TV, Sports news Story, Student Division	UAF Basketball Playoffs	Alan Frizzell
2006	TV, News Story, Student Division	UA Museum Addition	Dani Carlson
2006	TV, Comedy Feature, Student Division	Cooking with Sean and a Ninja	Sean Holland, Chris Green
2006	TV, Entertainment Program, Student Division	Tim Fite UAF Performance	Sean Holland, Jason Brewer, Chris Green
2006	TV, Uniquely Alaskan Program, Student Division	The Town Called Fairbanks	Sean Holland, Chris Green, Jason Brewer, Andrew Pan's
2006	Radio, Public Affairs Program, Student Division	Dreams - the Everything Bagel Show	Casey Grove, Jose Cruz-Gomez, Rosie Milligan
2006	Radio, Promotional Item, Student Division	Mr. KSUA Robot Sticker	Nick Brewer
2006	TV, Promotional Announcement, Student Division	KSUA TeaV	Sean Holland, Andrew Paris, Chris Green
2006	Radio, Comedy Feature, Student Division	KSUA Talk Show	Nick Brewer, H.B. Telling, Isaac Paris, Jessica Tamez
2006	TV, Newscast, Student Division	UAF Weekly News	Dani Carlson, Amy Chausse, Kelly Gitter, Laura Lowdermilk
2006	TV, Best Use of Video, Student Division	Ambient Japan	Sean Holland
2006	TV, Live Sports Event, Student Division	Woman's Swimming: UAF vs. LMU 10/22/05	Sean Holland
2006	TV, Public Affairs Program, Student Division	Governing Alaska's Natural Resources	Sean Holland
2006	TV, News Feature, Student Division	9th Annual Mush for Kids	Lauren Adams
2007	TV, Best Promotional Announcement, Student Division	Subways	Nick Brewer, Sean Holland
2007	TV, Entertainment Program, Student Division	KSUA Talk Show	Nick Brewer, Sven Gilkey
2007	TV, Public Affairs Program, Student Division	Outspoken	Kelly Gitter
2007	TV, Public Service Announcement, Student Division	My UA	Jaime Schwarzwald
2007	Best Radio Show, Student Division	United Nations of Music	Sean Bledsoe, Yan Matusevich
2007	Radio, Sports News Story, Student Division	Pre-Game Show: UAF vs. Western Michigan	Bruce Cech, Jim Culhane, Dallas Ferguson
2007	TV, Live Sport Event, Student Division	Volleyball: UAF vs. UAA	Sean Holland, Nicole Carvajal
2007	TV, Best Use of Video, Student Division	The Legend of St. Herman of Alaska	Sean Bledsoe, Yelena Matusevich
2007	Radio, Live Sports Event, Student Division	Playoff Game 3: UAF vs Western Michigan	Bruce Cech
2007	Radio, Entertainment Program, Student Division	Terra Firma	Tara Delana, Loquin Britton, Christina Sawyer
2007	Radio, News Feature, Series Entry, Student Division	9 to 5	Nora Gruner, Mary Donaldson
2007	Radio, Public Service Announcement, Student Division	Clucking Blossom	Matt Lynch, Tara Delana
2008	Radio, Live Sports Event, Student Division	Overtime Win: UAF vs. Western Michigan	Bruce Cech, Giacomo Accardo
2009	Radio, Public Service Announcement, Student Division	UAF Text2U PSA	Nick Hautman
2009	Radio, Live Sports Event, Student Division	Overtime Win: Alaska Nanooks vs. Ferris State, 2/21/09	Bruce Cech, Erik Drygas, Matthew Schroder
2009	Radio, Best Imaging, Student Division	Home and KSUA.net	Nick Hautman
2009	Radio, Promotional Announcement, Student Division	Junkyard Ghost Revival	Nick Hautman
2010	Radio, Live Sports Event, Student Division	Alaska Nanooks vs. Boston College NCAA NE Regional	Bruce Cech, Channon Price
2010	Radio, Entertainment Program, Student Division	International Talk like a Pirate Day	Nick Hautman
2011	Radio, Public Service, Student Division	Somalia PSA	Rebecca File, Maduabuchi Umekwe
2011	Radio, Uniquely Alaskan, Student Division	KSUA Takeout: Local Musician Discusses Life on Rural Alaskan Island	Rebecca File, Willis Fireball
2011	Radio, Entertainment Program, Student Division	KSUA Take Out: Buskalaska	Rebecca File, Paul Thompson
2011	Radio, Best Radio Show, Student Division	Foreign Affairs: Kreuzberg	Jack Ewers
2011	Radio, Best Promotional Announcement, Student Division	KSUA: Like Us	Rebecca File, Jack Ewers, Sam Herreid
2012	Public Service Announcement, 60 seconds or less, single entry, student division	Good Hygiene	Luke Soren Nielsen, Meghan Packee, Eli Barry-Garland
2012	Radio, Best Sports News Story, Student Division	Overtime Sports News	Michael Ives, Steve Morrow
2012	Best Promotional Announcement, 60 seconds of less, single entry	MC Sonny Golden Station ID	MC Sonny Golden
2012	Best Radio Show, Student Division	General Protection Fault	Jeremy Smith, Ivan Baird
2012	Radio, Entertainment Program, Student Division	KSUA Takeout: Laura Gibson	Brady Gross, Rebecca File
2014	Radio, Best Entertainment Feature, Student Division	Netherlands in Alaska	Jack O'Malley
2015	Student Radio, Best Promotional Announcement	Valentine's Day Party	Jack Ewers
2018	Student Radio, Best Radio Show	Critical Hits	Luke Soren Nielsen, Rachel Elmer, Amelia Cooper, Josh Tullar
2020	Student Radio, Best Profile	Speaking of Anthropology: Interview with Dr. Eske Willerslev	Kevin Huo (Host), Dillon McIntire (Host), Eske Willerslev (Guest)
2021	Student Radio, Best Profile	Two Peas in the Snow	Juancruz Montalvo Rivas (Host), Kristin Gadow (Host)
2023	Student Radio, Entertainment Program	Afrovibes with SONOFUCHE	Malachi Uche (Host), Moody Pierce (Editor), Kevin Huo (Additional Editing)
2023	Student Radio, Profile	Desert Crossing - Applying to an MFA in Creative Writing: One Accepted Student's Story	Aaron Salzman (Host), Courtney Skaggs (Guest)
2023	Student Radio, Promotional Announcement	KSUA Station Bumper - Station Ghost	Moody Pierce (Writer, Voice), Kjrsten Schindler (Voice), Wetherleigh Griffin (voice)
2023	Student Radio, Profile	Desert Crossing - Applying to an MFA in Creative Writing: One Accepted Student's Story	Aaron Salzman (Host), Courtney Skaggs (Guest)
2023	Student Radio, Public Service Announcement	KSUA Submissions PSA	Moody Pierce (Writer, Voice)
2023	Student Radio, Use of Digital Media	Desert Crossing: A Guide to Recommendation Letters (Academic Focused)	Aaron Salzman (Host)

Radiostar Awards by Radio Flag

Year	Category	Name
Spring 2012	Best Talk Show	General Protection Fault
Spring 2012	Best Sports Show	Overtime
Spring 2013	Best Music Show	Atlas Rocked
Spring 2015	Best Music Show	MakoBeats

== See also ==
- Campus radio
- List of college radio stations in the United States
