= KWHL =

Radio station in Anchorage, Alaska

Coordinates: 61.120°N 149.897°W

- Anchorage, Alaska; United States
- Broadcast area: Anchorage, Alaska
- Frequency: 106.5 MHz
- Branding: 106.5 K-Whale

Programming
- Format: Active rock
- Affiliations: United Stations Radio Networks

Ownership
- Owner: Connoisseur Media; (Alpha Media Licensee LLC)
- Sister stations: KAYO; KBRJ; KEAG; KFQD; KHAR; KMXS

History
- First air date: September 18, 1982
- Call sign meaning: "K-Whale"

Technical information
- Licensing authority: FCC
- Facility ID: 52672
- Class: C1
- ERP: 100,000 watts
- HAAT: 20 meters

Links
- Public license information: Public file; LMS
- Webcast: Listen live; Listen live (via iHeartRadio)
- Website: www.kwhl.com

KWHL (106.5 FM, "K-Whale") is a commercial active rock music radio station in Anchorage, Alaska. Owned by Connoisseur Media, its studios are located in Anchorage (two blocks west of Dimond Center), and its transmitter is in the Bayshore neighborhood in South Anchorage.
