= KBRJ =

Radio station in Anchorage, Alaska

- Anchorage, Alaska; United States
- Broadcast area: Anchorage metropolitan area
- Frequency: 104.1 MHz
- Branding: K-Bear 104.1

Programming
- Format: Country music
- Affiliations: Compass Media Networks; Westwood One

Ownership
- Owner: Connoisseur Media; (Alpha Media Licensee LLC)
- Sister stations: KAYO; KEAG; KFQD; KHAR; KMXS; KWHL

History
- First air date: December 22, 1966
- Former call signs: KHAR-FM (1966–1977); KKLV (1977–1992)
- Former frequencies: 103.9 MHz (1966–1984)

Technical information
- Licensing authority: FCC
- Facility ID: 60915
- Class: C1
- ERP: 55,000 watts
- HAAT: 19 meters (62 ft)

Links
- Public license information: Public file; LMS
- Webcast: Listen live; Listen live (via iHeartRadio)
- Website: www.listentothebear.com

KBRJ (104.1 FM) is a commercial country music radio station in Anchorage, Alaska. Owned by Connoisseur Media, its studios are located in Anchorage (two blocks west of Dimond Center), and its transmitter is in the Bayshore neighborhood in South Anchorage.
