= KFQD =

Radio station in Anchorage, Alaska

Coordinates: 61°20′16″N 150°2′11″W

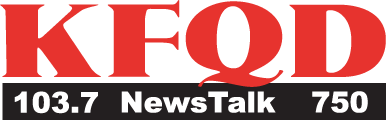
- Anchorage, Alaska; United States
- Frequency: 750 kHz
- Branding: News Talk 750 and 103.7 KFQD

Programming
- Format: Talk radio
- Affiliations: ABC News Radio; NBC News Radio; Compass Media Networks; KTUU-TV; Radio America; Westwood One

Ownership
- Owner: Connoisseur Media; (Alpha Media Licensee LLC)
- Sister stations: KAYO; KBRJ; KEAG; KHAR; KMXS; KWHL

History
- First air date: May 17, 1924

Technical information
- Licensing authority: FCC
- Facility ID: 52675
- Class: A
- Power: 50,000 watts
- Translator: 103.7 K279BG (Anchorage)

Links
- Public license information: Public file; LMS
- Webcast: Listen live
- Website: kfqd.com

KFQD (750 AM, "News Talk 750 and 103.7") is a commercial radio station licensed to Anchorage, Alaska, United States. It broadcasts a talk format and is owned by Connoisseur Media. The studios and offices are on Arctic Slope Avenue in Anchorage.

KFQD is the oldest radio station in Alaska and one of the most powerful. It is a Class A, 50,000 watt, non-directional station broadcasting on a clear channel frequency. The transmitter site is off Merlene Lane in Point MacKenzie.

KFQD is Alaska's primary entry point for the Emergency Alert System (EAS). It is also heard on 250 watt FM translator 103.7 K279BG in Anchorage and its adjacent suburbs.

== History ==
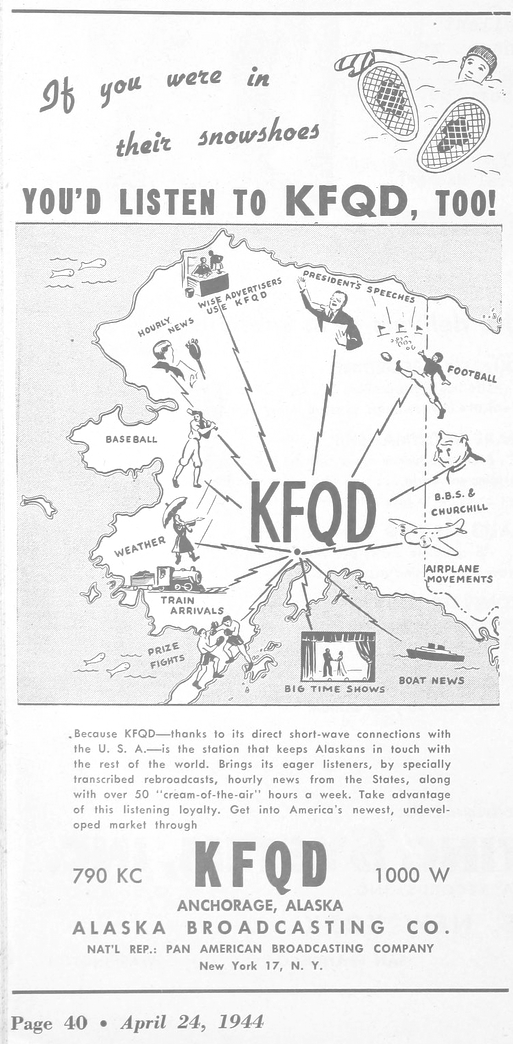
1944 station advertisement

KFQD was first licensed on May 20, 1924, to the Chovin Supply Company. The call letters were randomly assigned from an alphabetical roster of available call signs. The station was deleted in early 1925, but relicensed, again to Chovin Supply Company as KFQD, later that year.

In 1926, ownership was transferred to the Anchorage Radio Club. In 1929, the station was deleted a second time, but revived by the Anchorage Radio Club later that year. By the 1930s, KFQD was transmitting at 780 kHz, with a power of 250 watts, and studios at 411 Fourth Avenue.

With the 1941 implementation of the North American Regional Broadcasting Agreement (NARBA), KFQD moved to 790 kHz, a regional frequency, still powered at 250 watts, but able to broadcast around the clock. By this time, there were four radio stations in the Territory of Alaska. KFQD was the oldest, followed by stations in Ketchikan (KGBU, July 29, 1926), Juneau (KINY, June 25, 1935), and Fairbanks (KFAR, October 30, 1939).

In the late 1940s, KFQD got a power boost to 5,000 watts. In the 1960s, it moved to the clear channel frequency 750 kHz, shared with WSB in Atlanta but far enough away to avoid causing nighttime interference. At first, KFQD was powered at 10,000 watts. By the 1970s, it had raised its daytime power to 50,000 watts, but still 10,000 watts at night.

Then in the 1990s, as the Federal Communications Commission relaxed protections for the original clear channel stations, KFQD was permitted to broadcast at 50,000 watts around the clock, joining WSB as a Class A station on 750 AM.

In 1998, KFQD was acquired by Morris Communications.

Alpha Media LLC became KFQD's owner on September 1, 2015. Alpha Media merged with Connoisseur Media on September 4, 2025.

== Programming ==
KFQD was the radio play-by-play home of the ECHL's Alaska Aces, which was simulcast by GCI on their cable network. KFQD also simulcasts some of the newscasts of KTUU-TV Channel 2, the Anchorage NBC affiliate.

== See also ==
- "Bomb Iran", a version of which was produced at and aired on KFQD in 1980, and which brought some national attention to the station.
