= The Chechahcos =

1924 film

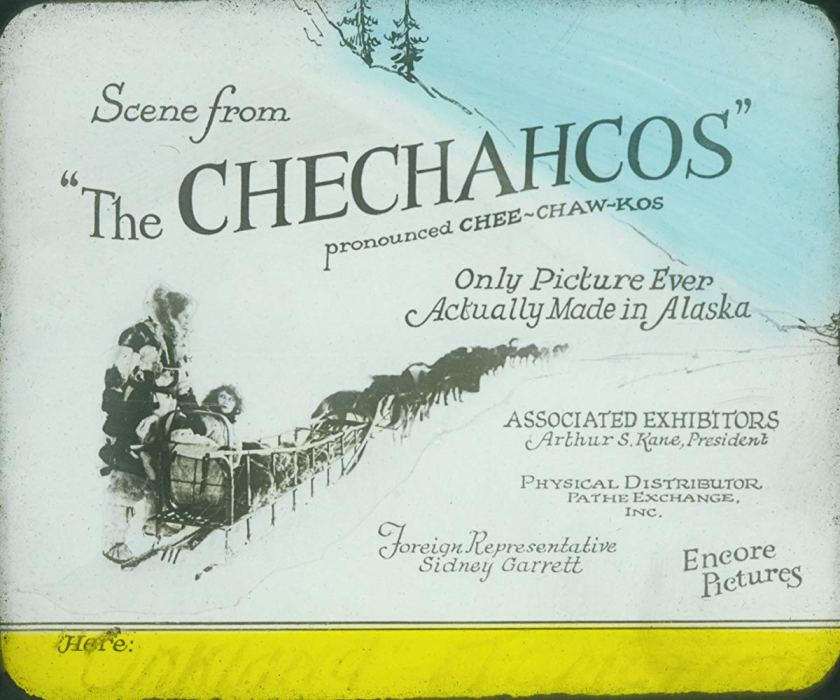
- Glass advertisement slide for the film
- Directed by: Lewis H. Moomaw
- Written by: Lewis H. Moomaw; Harvey Gates
- Produced by: George Ed. Lewis
- Starring: William Dills; Albert Van Antwerp; Eva Gordon; Alexis B. Luce
- Cinematography: Hobort Brownell; Raymond Johnson
- Production company: Alaska Moving Pictures Corporation
- Distributed by: Associated Exhibitors; Pathé
- Release date: May 11, 1924
- Running time: 87 minutes
- Country: United States
- Language: Silent (English intertitles)

The Chechahcos is a 1924 American silent adventure drama film about the gold rush days in the Klondike. Chechahco, more commonly spelled cheechako, is a Chinook Jargon word for "newcomer", and the film focuses on a group of would-be prospectors sailing for Alaska. The film was directed by Lewis H. Moomaw and produced by Austin E. Lathrop, who himself was once a prospector. The film was distributed by Associated Exhibitors. The film was the first shot on location in Alaska.

== Plot ==
The full film.

A ship headed towards the Klondike Gold Rush of the late 1890s catches on fire and all onboard must abandon ship. Passenger Margaret Stanlaw (Eva Gordon) loses her young daughter Ruth (Baby Margie) in the ensuing panic, and is informed by shady gambler Richard Steele (Alexis B. Luce) that she did not survive. In actuality, Ruth is saved by prospective prospectors “Horseshoe” Riley and Bob Dexter (William Dills and Albert Van Altwerp). This new makeshift family arrives in Anchorage and almost immediately strikes gold. 15 years later Ruth is now a young adult (Gladys Johnson), who is having an inexplicable attraction to Dexter, the man who helped raise her and is essentially her father. When Margaret and Richard come into town to run the local saloon, secrets will be revealed, pasts will be confronted, and the Alaskan terrain will be filmed for the first time.

== Cast ==
- William Dills as 'Horseshoe' Riley
- Albert Van Antwerp as Engineer Bob Dexter
- Eva Gordon as Mrs. Margaret Stanlaw (credited as Miss Eva Gordon)
- Baby Margie as Baby Ruth Stanlaw
- Alexis B. Luce as Gambler Richard Steele
- Gladys Johnson as Ruth Stanlaw (credited as Gladys Johnston)
- Guerney Hays as Pierre - Steele's Henchman (uncredited)
- H. Mills as Engineer (uncredited)
- Howard Webster as Professor Stanlaw (uncredited)

== Preservation ==
A print of the film was maintained in the University of Alaska Fairbanks film archive. In 2003, this film was deemed "culturally, historically, or aesthetically significant" by the United States Library of Congress and selected for preservation in the National Film Registry.

== See also ==
- Treasures from American Film Archives
