= KMXS =

Radio station in Anchorage, Alaska

Coordinates: 61.192°N 149.902°W

- Anchorage, Alaska; United States
- Broadcast area: Anchorage, Alaska
- Frequency: 103.1 MHz
- Branding: Mix 103.1

Programming
- Format: Hot adult contemporary
- Affiliations: Compass Media Networks

Ownership
- Owner: Connoisseur Media; (Alpha Media Licensee LLC)
- Sister stations: KAYO; KBRJ; KEAG; KFQD; KHAR; KWHL

History
- First air date: September 1, 1987 (as KXDZ)
- Former call signs: KBLK (1985–1986, CP); KXDZ (1986–1994)
- Call sign meaning: "Mix"

Technical information
- Licensing authority: FCC
- Facility ID: 52677
- Class: C1
- ERP: 100,000 watts
- HAAT: 31.9 meters (105 ft)

Links
- Public license information: Public file; LMS
- Webcast: Listen live; Listen live (via iHeartRadio)
- Website: kmxs.com

KMXS (103.1 FM) is a commercial hot adult contemporary music radio station in Anchorage, Alaska. Owned by Connoisseur Media, its studios are located in Anchorage (two blocks west of Dimond Center), and its transmitter is in the North Star neighborhood.
