= KEAG =

Radio station in Anchorage, Alaska

- Anchorage, Alaska; United States
- Broadcast area: Anchorage, Alaska
- Frequency: 97.3 MHz
- Branding: 97.3 Kool FM

Programming
- Format: Classic hits

Ownership
- Owner: Connoisseur Media; (Alpha Media Licensee LLC)
- Sister stations: KAYO; KBRJ; KFQD; KHAR; KMXS; KWHL

History
- First air date: 1988

Technical information
- Licensing authority: FCC
- Facility ID: 28648
- Class: C1
- ERP: 55,000 watts
- HAAT: 19 meters (62 ft)
- Transmitter coordinates: 61.4221°N 149.8744°W

Links
- Public license information: Public file; LMS
- Webcast: Listen live; Listen live (via iHeartRadio)
- Website: www.kool973.com

KEAG (97.3 FM, "97.3 Kool FM") is a commercial radio station in Anchorage, Alaska. KEAG airs a classic hits music format. Owned by Connoisseur Media, its studios are located in Anchorage (two blocks west of Dimond Center), and its transmitter is in Knik, Alaska.
