= KGOT =

Coordinates: 61.166°N 149.828°W

Anchorage, Alaska; United States
- Broadcast area: Anchorage metropolitan area
- Frequency: 101.3 MHz (HD Radio)
- Branding: 101.3 KGOT

Programming
- Format: Contemporary hit radio
- Subchannels: HD2: KTZN simulcast HD3: Radio by Grace
- Affiliations: Premiere Networks

Ownership
- Owner: iHeartMedia; (iHM Licenses, LLC)
- Sister stations: KASH-FM; KBFX; KENI; KTZN; KYMG

History
- First air date: September 15, 1975
- Former call signs: KYAK-FM (CP, 1974–1975)

Technical information
- Licensing authority: FCC
- Facility ID: 12515
- Class: C2
- ERP: 26,000 watts
- HAAT: −20 meters (−66 ft)

Links
- Public license information: Public file; LMS
- Webcast: Listen live (via iHeartRadio)
- Website: kgot.iheart.com

KGOT (101.3 FM) is a commercial radio station in Anchorage, Alaska. The station airs a contemporary hit radio format and is owned by iHeartMedia Along with its sister stations, it broadcasts from studios on East Dimond Boulevard in the Dimond Center. It carries On Air with Ryan Seacrest in middays and American Top 40 with Ryan Seacrest on Sundays.

KGOT has an effective radiated power (ERP) of 26,000 watts as a Class C2 station. The transmitter is off Dowling Road near North Drive in Southeast Anchorage.

== History ==
In the 1970s, KYAK 650 AM (now KENI) was awarded a construction permit to start an FM station in Anchorage on 101.3 MHz. Before it began broadcasting, it was given the call sign KYAK-FM. The station signed on the air on September 15, 1975.

Once it was broadcasting, the call sign were changed to KGOT and it aired an album-oriented rock (AOR) format. The station was largely known in the Anchorage radio market for its decades-long association with disc jockey Larry Wayne who also had a stint during this time at sister station KENI when it was a Top 40 station. Wayne became a born-again Christian during his time at the station and later hosted a contemporary Christian music show on Sundays. After leaving Anchorage, he became an air personality on national Christian music networks Air1 and K-Love.

KGOT flipped to contemporary hit radio in the 1990s. It started using the moniker "Alaska's #1 Hit Music Station" in 1996 under the program director Paul Walker. The station was No. 1 in the market for many years in the late 1990s and early 2000s. Some important talent included Scott & Stu, featured on KGOT for many years. The station still identifies as "Alaska's #1 hit music station" today.

== Previous logo ==
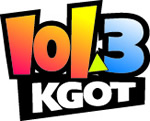
