= KCBF =

Radio station in Fairbanks, Alaska

Coordinates: 64°48′29.5″N 147°29′47.7″W

- Fairbanks, Alaska; United States
- Frequency: 820 kHz
- Branding: 820 Sports

Programming
- Format: Sports
- Affiliations: ESPN Radio

Ownership
- Owner: Tor Ingstad; (Tor Ingstad Licenses, LLC)
- Sister stations: KFAR, KTDZ, KXLR, KWLF, KWDD

History
- First air date: 1948 (as KFRB at 1290)
- Former call signs: KFRB (1948–1981)
- Former frequencies: 1290 kHz (1948–1953); 790 kHz (1953–1954); 900 kHz (1954–1981)

Technical information
- Licensing authority: FCC
- Facility ID: 49645
- Class: A
- Power: 10,000 watts
- Translator: 107.9 K300DL (Fairbanks)

Links
- Public license information: Public file; LMS
- Webcast: Listen live
- Website: espnradiofairbanks.com

KCBF (820 AM) is a commercial radio station airing sports programming in Fairbanks, Alaska. KCBF obtains its programming from ESPN Radio.

It signed on in 1948 as KFRB on 1290 kHz. It moved to 790 kHz in 1953 then to 900 kHz in 1954. It moved to its current frequency in 1981.

KCBF is the exclusive radio home to University of Alaska Nanooks hockey. The station also serves coverage of the Nanooks' men's and select women's basketball games. It was also the former radio home of Fairbanks Grizzlies football.

KCBF is also the Fairbanks radio affiliate for the NFL on Westwood One Sports and the NCAA radio network during the Final Four men's basketball tournament.

KCBF former sports logo

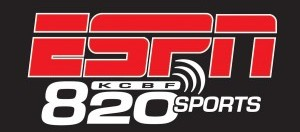
KCBF Previous sports logo before 107.9 translator sign on
