= KASH-FM =

Coordinates: 61.336°N 149.516°W

Anchorage, Alaska; United States
- Broadcast area: Anchorage, Alaska
- Frequency: 107.5 MHz (HD Radio)
- Branding: KASH Country 107.5

Programming
- Format: Country
- Affiliations: Premiere Networks

Ownership
- Owner: iHeartMedia, Inc.; (iHM Licenses, LLC)
- Sister stations: KBFX, KENI, KGOT, KTZN, KYMG

History
- First air date: December 1, 1985
- Former call signs: KASH-FM (1985–1988); KASH (1988–1989)
- Call sign meaning: similar to "cash"

Technical information
- Licensing authority: FCC
- Facility ID: 12958
- Class: C1
- ERP: 100,000 watts
- HAAT: 299 meters (981 ft)

Links
- Public license information: Public file; LMS
- Webcast: Listen live (via iHeartRadio)
- Website: kashcountry1075.iheart.com

KASH-FM (107.5 MHz) is a commercial country music radio station in Anchorage, Alaska. It is owned by iHeartMedia, Inc. Its studios are located at Dimond Center in Anchorage, and its transmitter is located in Eagle River, Alaska.

== History ==
The station signed on the air on December 1, 1985. On June 3, 1990, the station's building was heavily damaged by a fire.
