= KXLR =

Radio station in Fairbanks, Alaska

Coordinates: 64.877°N 147.815°W

- Fairbanks, Alaska; United States
- Broadcast area: Fairbanks, Alaska
- Frequency: 95.9 MHz
- Branding: 95.9 X-Rock

Programming
- Format: Active rock

Ownership
- Owner: Rob Ingstad; (Rob Ingstad Licenses, LLC)
- Sister stations: KCBF, KFAR, KTDZ, KWLF, KWDD

History
- First air date: 1990
- Former call signs: KRKO (1985-1987); KINQ (1987-1990)

Technical information
- Licensing authority: FCC
- Facility ID: 49622
- Class: C1
- ERP: 28,000 watts
- HAAT: 233 meters (764 ft)

Links
- Public license information: Public file; LMS
- Webcast: KXLR Webstream
- Website: xrock959.com

KXLR (95.9 FM) is a commercial active rock music radio station in Fairbanks, Alaska. It signed on the air in 1990 and was originally owned by Northern Television, the then-parent company of KTVF and KCBF.

In May 2007, KXLR switched from standard classic rock to album-oriented rock under the branding "X-Rock". The "X-Rock" branding was also on sister station KXLW in Anchorage, which is now known as 96.3 The Wolf. KXLR currently reports to Arbitron as an active rock station.
