= KHAR =

Radio station in Anchorage, Alaska

Coordinates: 61°7′10″N 149°53′50.9″W

- Anchorage, Alaska; United States
- Broadcast area: Anchorage metropolitan area
- Frequency: 590 kHz
- Branding: Gold Rush Radio

Programming
- Format: Soft oldies; adult standards
- Affiliations: Westwood One's America's Best Music

Ownership
- Owner: Connoisseur Media; (Alpha Media Licensee LLC)
- Sister stations: KBRJ; KEAG; KFQD; KMXS; KWHL

History
- First air date: January 7, 1961; 65 years ago
- Call sign meaning: Station founder Willis Harpel

Technical information
- Licensing authority: FCC
- Facility ID: 60914
- Class: B
- Power: 5,000 watts unlimited
- Translator: 96.7 K244EG (Anchorage)

Links
- Public license information: Public file; LMS
- Webcast: Listen live; Listen live (via iHeartRadio)
- Website: www.alaskagoldrushradio.com

KHAR (590 AM) is a commercial radio station in Anchorage, Alaska. It airs a soft oldies and adult standards radio format, supplied by Westwood One's "America's Best Music" service. It is owned by Connoisseur Media, with studios on Arctic Slope Avenue, two blocks west of the Dimond Center Shopping Mall in Anchorage.

KHAR is a Class B station powered at 5,000 watts non-directional. Its transmitter is off C Street at West Klatt Road in the Bayshore neighborhood of South Anchorage. Programming is also heard on 250-watt FM translator K244EG at 96.7 MHz.

== History ==
KHAR signed on the air on January 7, 1961. It was founded by Willis "Bill" Harpel, who previously worked at KFQD and owned stations in Washington state. He founded Sourdough Broadcasters, and later launched 104.1 KHAR-FM (now KBRJ) and KHAR-TV 13 (now KYUR). The station's call sign included the first three letters of Harpel's last name. Harpel died accidentally in January 1968. His family, particularly widow Patricia and son Craig, continued to run Sourdough Broadcasters for several more decades.

During its earlier decades, KHAR, like many AM stations, aired a general format, including music and news. Notable aspects of early programming included broadcasting messages to Bush residents, a practice once fairly common among broadcasters in Alaska. The station was also noted for carrying the commentaries of Ruben Gaines, a onetime poet laureate of Alaska known for creating the character "Chilkoot Charlie".

KHAR's former Heart Radio logo

KHAR programmed an adult standards format from the 1970s until 2013. The station's branding, Heart Radio 59, was also featured for decades. KHAR was one of only a few commercial stations in Alaska whose format more or less remained intact during the era of broadcasting company consolidation which began in the 1990s. KHAR was one of a number of Anchorage stations acquired by Morris Communications. It shares studios with its sister stations in the Morris Alaska building near the Dimond Center.

On May 1, 2013, KHAR changed its format from adult standards to all-sports. It carried programming from CBS Sports Radio. Morris Communications sold KHAR and 32 other stations to Alpha Media LLC effective September 1, 2015, at a purchase price of $38.25 million.

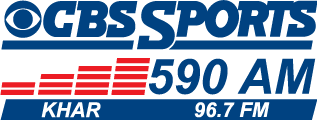
Logo under sports format, 2013-2024

On April 1, 2024, the station flipped back to soft oldies and adult standards as "Gold Rush Radio". The format is described as carrying four decades of the greatest hits of all time, including a "blend of the best pop, soft AC and easy listening". The format, from Westwood One's "America's Best Music" service, does not have DJs. Alpha Media merged with Connoisseur Media on September 4, 2025.

== Translator ==
KHAR is also broadcast on the following FM translator:

Broadcast translator for KHAR
Call sign	Frequency	City of license	FID	ERP (W)	Class	FCC info
K244EG	96.7 FM	Anchorage, Alaska	139580	250	D	LMS

== See also ==
- List of radio stations in Alaska
