= KIAK-FM =

Radio station in Fairbanks, Alaska

Coordinates: 64.915°N 147.650°W

- Fairbanks, Alaska; United States
- Broadcast area: Fairbanks, Alaska
- Frequency: 102.5 MHz
- Branding: 102.5 KIAK

Programming
- Format: Country
- Affiliations: Compass Media Networks; Premiere Networks; Westwood One

Ownership
- Owner: iHeartMedia, Inc.; (iHM Licenses, LLC)
- Sister stations: KAKQ-FM, KFBX, KKED

History
- First air date: September 21, 1983
- Former call signs: KEME (CP, 1981); KQRZ (1981–1990)

Technical information
- Licensing authority: FCC
- Facility ID: 12517
- Class: C1
- ERP: 100,000 watts
- HAAT: 174 meters (571 ft)

Links
- Public license information: Public file; LMS
- Webcast: Listen live (via iHeartRadio)
- Website: kiak.iheart.com

KIAK-FM (102.5 FM) is a commercial country radio station in Fairbanks, Alaska.

The frequency originally belonged to KQRZ until KIAK (now KFBX) decided to move their country music format to FM in 1990.
