= KAKQ-FM =

Hot adult contemporary radio station in Fairbanks, Alaska

Coordinates: 64.915°N 147.650°W

- Fairbanks, Alaska; United States
- Broadcast area: Fairbanks metropolitan area
- Frequency: 101.1 MHz
- Branding: Magic 101.1 FM

Programming
- Language: English
- Format: Hot adult contemporary

Ownership
- Owner: iHeartMedia; (iHM Licenses, LLC)
- Sister stations: KFBX; KIAK-FM; KKED

History
- First air date: 1981
- Former call signs: KAME (CP, 1978–1979); KAYY (1979–1992); KAKQ (1992–1993)

Technical information
- Licensing authority: FCC
- Facility ID: 12519
- Class: C1
- ERP: 50,000 watts
- HAAT: 174 meters (571 ft)

Links
- Public license information: Public file; LMS
- Webcast: Listen live (via iHeartRadio)
- Website: 101magic.iheart.com

KAKQ-FM (101.1 MHz) is a commercial hot adult contemporary music radio station in Fairbanks, Alaska.

== History ==
The station signed on the air as KAYY in 1981 as Fairbanks' first commercial FM radio station. The call letters for KAKQ were previously used by an AM radio in the same area that broadcast between 1987 and 1995.

Previous logo
