= KFBX =

Radio station in Fairbanks, Alaska

- Fairbanks, Alaska; United States
- Frequency: 970 kHz
- Branding: NewsRadio 970 KFBX

Programming
- Format: Talk radio
- Affiliations: 24/7 News; Premiere Networks; Compass Media Networks; Westwood One

Ownership
- Owner: iHeartMedia, Inc.; (iHM Licenses, LLC)
- Sister stations: KAKQ-FM, KIAK-FM, KKED

History
- First air date: September 18, 1972
- Former call signs: KIAK (1972–2004)
- Call sign meaning: A common abbreviation for Fairbanks

Technical information
- Licensing authority: FCC
- Facility ID: 12518
- Class: B
- Power: 10,000 watts
- Transmitter coordinates: 64°52′46.5″N 147°40′37.7″W

Links
- Public license information: Public file; LMS
- Webcast: Listen live (via iHeartRadio)
- Website: 970kfbx.iheart.com

KFBX (970 AM) is a commercial radio station licensed to Fairbanks, Alaska, United States. Owned by iHeartMedia, Inc., it airs a talk radio format, with studios on 9th Avenue off Cushman Street in Fairbanks, and transmitter sited off Farmer's Loop Road in Fairbanks.

== History ==
On July 24, 1970, Big Country Radio, Inc., owner of KYAK in Anchorage, applied for a construction permit to build a new radio station on 970 kHz in Fairbanks, which was approved on January 13, 1971. The station began broadcasting on September 18, 1972, airing a country music format.

Big Country Radio sold its three Alaska radio properties—KIAK, KYAK and Anchorage FM outlet KGOT—to Prime Time of Alaska, a company owned by interests from Washington state, in 1978 for more than $3 million. Prime Time owned a country music station in Everett, Washington, KWYZ.

1983 was an eventful year for KIAK. Prime Time sold the station to Bingham Broadcasting, controlled by a minority owner of a Seattle station, for $4.5 million. The sale included KIAK's FM construction permit, KQRZ (102.5 FM), which launched that July and originally played a Top 40 format. At the end of that month, a 28-year-old man threatened to blow up the station if he did not get air time; he was startled to find that the station was actually an automated operation and ultimately surrendered. In fact, KIAK had been automated since 1975, using a syndicated format from Drake-Chenault; the automation equipment was dubbed by the station as the "Big Country Machine".

Bingham sold all four of his stations—AM-FM pairs in Anchorage and Fairbanks—to Olympia Broadcasting for about $12 million at the very end of 1985. In January 1990, the contemporary country format of KIAK moved to the former KQRZ, which became KIAK-FM; KIAK began to focus more on a classic country format and added several new talk programs. Olympia would file for Chapter 11 bankruptcy protection in June 1990, setting off a lengthy process that included three different abortive sale attempts of the company's four Alaska properties. A deal with Harbor Broadcasting was doomed by a license challenge by the NAACP; while a settlement was reached, the FCC conditioned the sale on the license renewals, and Olympia was anxious to sell the stations to satisfy its creditors.

The next sale attempt, to Alpha & Beta Broadcasting, was canceled by the company's receiver in early 1992 due to a conflict between creditor Barclays and lender Greyhound Financial; the latter felt that the stations had sold for too little money. In January 1993, the receiver proposed to sell the stations to Community Pacific Broadcasting for $1.2 million, but this was superseded by a $1.45 million offer from Craig McCaw's COMCO Broadcasting. By this time, KIAK had largely become a sports talk outlet.

Comco sold its entire station portfolio, including KIAK-AM-FM and KAKQ-FM in Fairbanks, to Capstar Broadcasting Partners, a forerunner to present owner iHeartMedia, in 1997. The call letters were changed from KIAK to KFBX in October 2004.
