= Austin E. Lathrop =

American politician and industrialist

Austin Eugene "Cap" Lathrop (October 5, 1865 – July 26, 1950) was an American politician, industrialist, and outspoken opponent of Alaskan statehood. He has been called "Alaska's first home-grown millionaire."

== Early life ==
"Cap" Lathrop was born in 1865 in Lapeer County, Michigan to Eugene Lathrop and Susan (Sarah) Miriah Parsons Lathrop. He was expelled from school in the ninth grade for damages caused when he tampered with a water heater. He is a descendant of Reverend John Lathrop (1584-1653) of Barnstable, Mass. (ancestors of Austin are, Eugene, Horace, Abiel, Benjamin, Israel, Samuel, son of John Lathrop.

After the Great Seattle Fire of 1889, Lathrop moved to that city and worked for a time as a contractor. He made plans to settle in Anacortes, but the Panic of 1893 disrupted his business and he was forced to return to Seattle. In 1895, he purchased a steam ship, the L.J. Perry, and embarked on a new venture, transporting goods to the Territory of Alaska. Once the Klondike Gold Rush started, business picked up, and soon he was transporting both prospectors and the goods that they required.

== Alaska ==
Lathrop married a widow, Mrs. Cosby McDowell of Seattle in a 1901 ceremony in Valdez, Alaska, where Lathrop had taken up residence. This was the first wedding in the history of Valdez. It was her third marriage, and she was a very popular socialite among the Alaskan crowd who knew her. Mrs. McDowell Lathrop and her daughter relocated to Seattle in 1909 for health reasons. She died there in 1910 from paresis (complications of syphilis) in a house built for her by Lathrop, and was cared for 24 hours/day by a Dr. Loughery, who was hired for the task by Lathrop, until her death. The house became known as Washington State's first "psychiatric hospital", and Loughery went on to manage Western State Hospital at Steilacoom and Northern State Hospital at Sedro Woolley.

In 1902, Lathrop's California-Alaska Mining and Development Company set up a camp at the mouth of the Kluvesna River, and in 1903, Lathrop drilled unsuccessfully for oil in Cold Bay.

Lathrop moved to Cordova in 1908, and was elected mayor in 1911. That same year he converted a clothing store into a movie theater, The Empress. He went on to construct Empress movie theaters in Anchorage (1916) and Fairbanks (1927), as well as the Lacey Street Theater (Fairbanks, 1936–1940) and the Fourth Avenue Theatre (Anchorage, 1941–1947; construction was interrupted by World War II). From 1920 to 1922, Lathrop served in the Alaska Territorial House of Representatives. In 1924, he produced The Chechahcos, the first feature-length film shot entirely in Alaska.

Lathrop moved to Fairbanks, and in 1929, purchased the Fairbanks Daily News-Miner. In 1937, he began work on the building that would house KFAR, Fairbanks's first radio station licensed under the Communications Act of 1934. The call-letters formed an acronym for "Key for Alaska's Riches". KFAR made its inaugural broadcast on October 1, 1939. In 1948, Lathrop opened his second radio station, KENI in Anchorage.

In 1932, Lathrop became a member of the Board of Trustees of the Alaska Agricultural College and the School of Mines. In 1935, the college's name was changed to the University of Alaska. The Board of Trustees became the Board of Regents. Lathrop would continue to serve in this position until his death.

== Death ==
On July 26, 1950, Lathrop was killed in an accident when he was struck by a railroad car in the yard of his Suntrana coal plant. He was buried at Forest Lawn Cemetery in West Seattle.

== Bibliography ==
- Tower, Elizabeth A. Mining, Media, Movies: Cap Lathrop's Keys for Alaska's Riches 1991
- Tower, Elizabeth A. Alaska's First Homegrown Millionaire 2006 (ISBN 1594330395)
