= Fourth Avenue Theatre (Anchorage, Alaska) =

- U.S. National Register of Historic Places
- Alaska Heritage Resources Survey
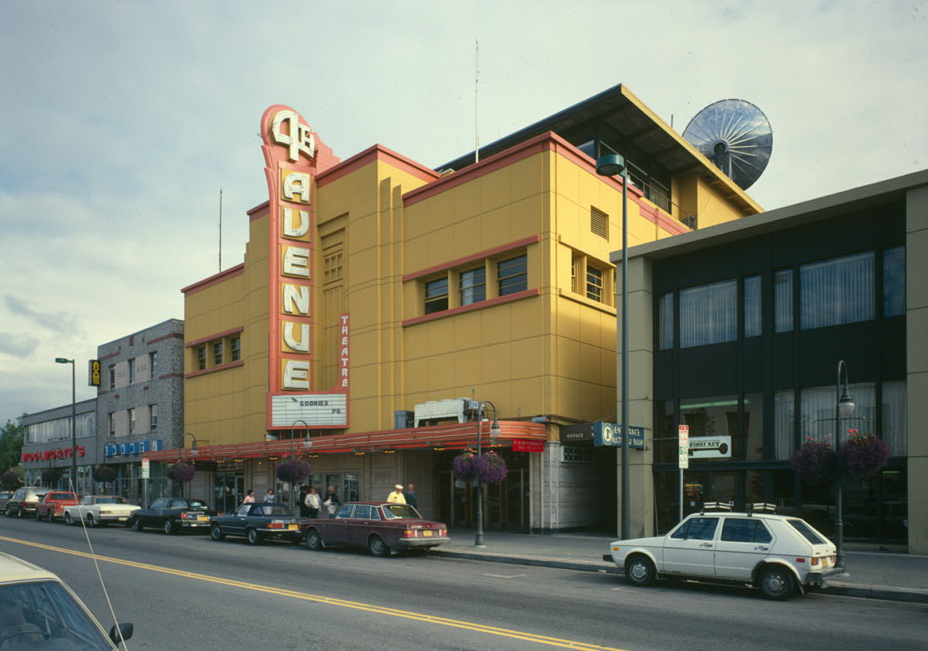

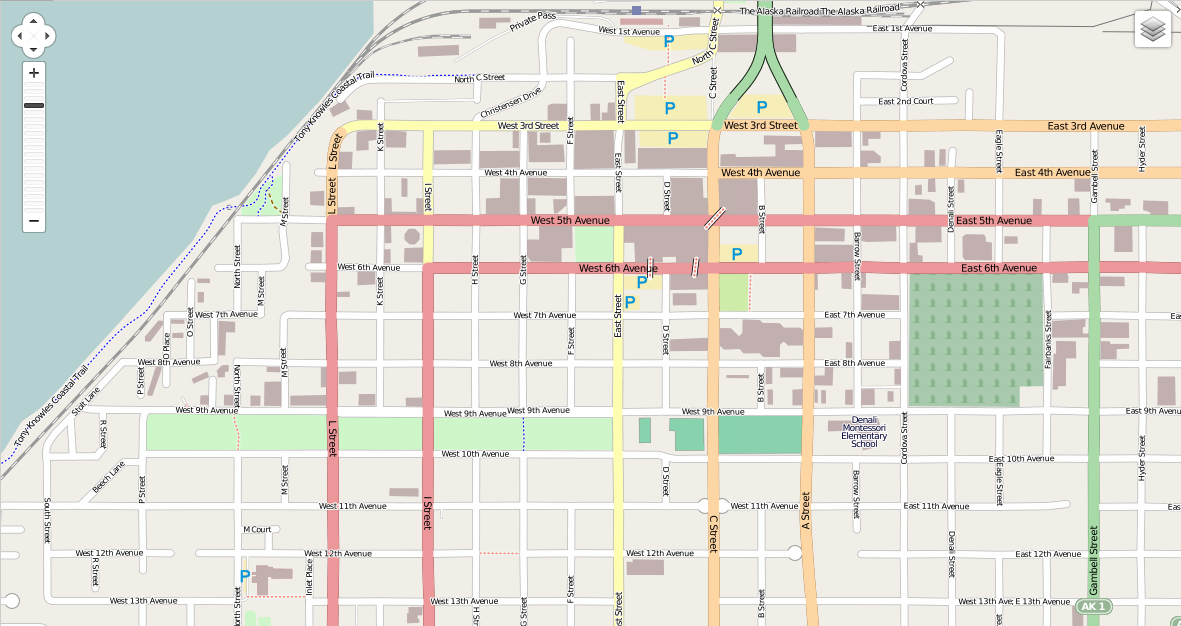
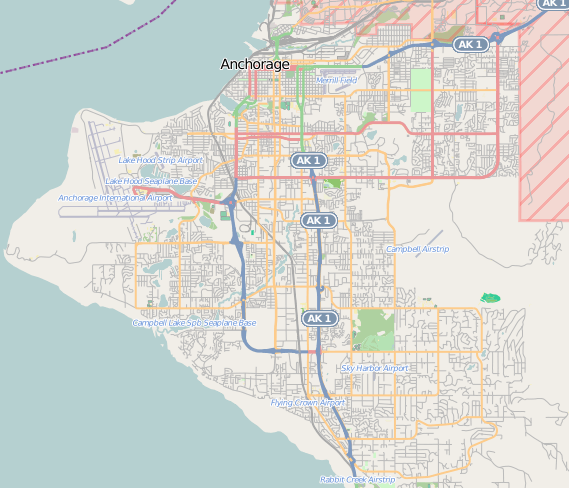
- Location within Downtown Anchorage Location within Anchorage Location within Alaska
- Interactive map showing the location of Fourth Avenue Theatre
- Location: 630 West 4th Avenue, Anchorage, Alaska
- Coordinates: 61°13′6″N 149°53′40″W
- Area: 0.3 acres (0.12 ha)
- Built: 1941-1947
- Built by: C.W. Hufeisen
- Architect: B. Marcus Priteca and Augustine A. Porreca
- Architectural style: Art Deco
- NRHP reference No.: 82001620
- AHRS No.: ANC-284

Significant dates
- Added to NRHP: October 05, 1982
- Designated AHRS: 1981

The Fourth Avenue Theatre, also known as the Lathrop Building, was a movie theater in Anchorage, Alaska that has been described as Art Deco, Streamline Moderne, and Art Moderne in style. Built beginning in 1941 and completed in 1947 after a halt during World War II, somewhat after the heyday of these styles, it was a large 960-seat first-run theater until the 1980s.

The theater was designed by B. Marcus Priteca, a leading designer of themed cinemas in America, in association with Seattle architect A.A. Porreca for Cap Lathrop, a prominent Alaska businessman. The theater's lobby featured a gold leaf mural of Mount McKinley, but originally omitted a concession stand, a feature Lathrop felt was inappropriate.

The main house was decorated with silver and gold murals by Anthony Heinsbergen and Frank Bouman of Los Angeles, and a rendering of the Big Dipper (a symbol of Alaska) on the ceiling. Murals were done on canvas with reliefs in Masonite leafed with gold and silver. The building's structure is reinforced concrete with travertine on the exterior street level.

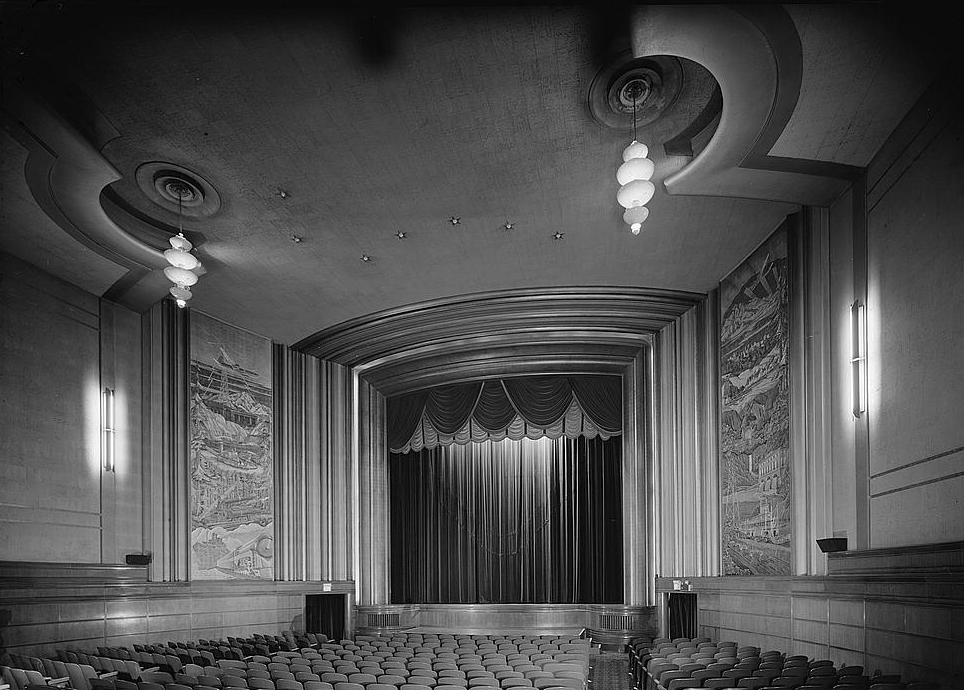
Interior, Fourth Avenue Theatre

As the Lathrop Building, the complex included facilities for Lathrop's radio and television stations, a restaurant, and a penthouse apartment added in 1959–1960.

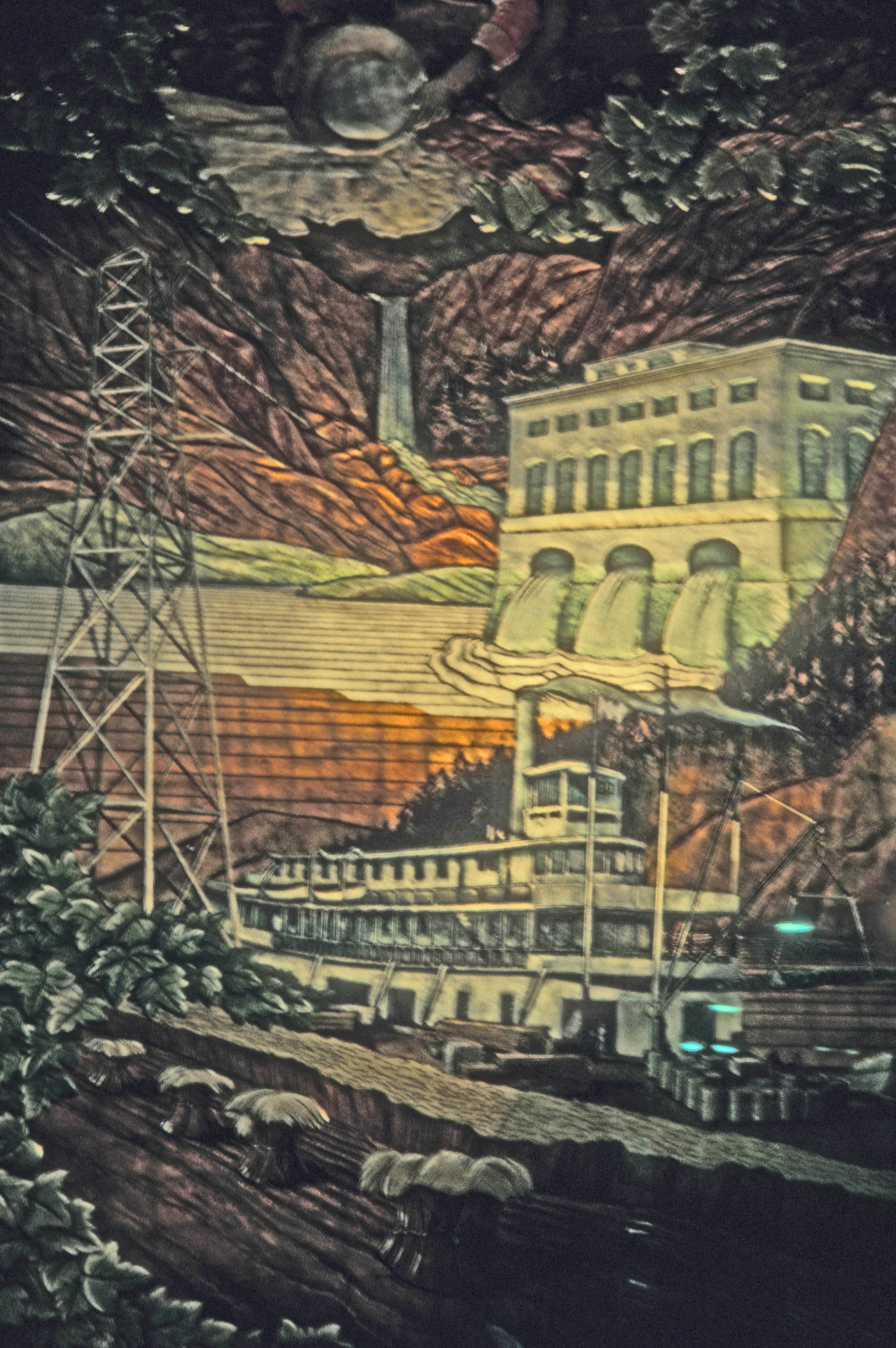
Mural in the theater

After some renovation by the city of Anchorage, the theater was used by a catering firm as a banquet facility. Rasmuson Foundation approved a program related investment structured as a low-interest loan to the Municipality of Anchorage in 2006 so that the city could purchase, restore and use the Theater for meeting space by the Anchorage Convention and Visitors Bureau. When the Anchorage Assembly voted to prohibit the city to act as the loan guarantor, Rasmuson Foundation rescinded the award offer. Due to the economic recession in the following years, these plans did not come to fruition. In 2011, the theater's new owner, Peach Investments, presented new restoration plans.

In a press conference on May 17, 2022, Anchorage mayor Dave Bronson announced his support for a near-complete redevelopment of the entire city block including the theater building. The proposal would include demolition of the theater building by owner Peach Holdings, LLC, which owns all but one corner parcel on the block between Fourth and Fifth Avenues and F and G streets. However, the plan for the anticipated $200 million multi-use project includes partial reconstruction of the theater's facade and signage. It was demolished in late 2022.

== See also ==
- KENI Radio Building, by A.A. Porreca
- National Register of Historic Places listings in Anchorage, Alaska
