= KFAR =

Radio station in Fairbanks, Alaska

Coordinates: 64°48′29.5″N 147°29′47.7″W

- Fairbanks, Alaska; United States
- Broadcast area: Alaska Interior area
- Frequency: 660 kHz
- Branding: KFAR Radio

Programming
- Format: Talk radio
- Affiliations: Fox News Radio; NBC News Radio; Compass Media Networks; Premiere Networks; Westwood One

Ownership
- Owner: Rob Ingstad; (Rob Ingstad Licenses, LLC)
- Sister stations: KCBF, KTDZ, KWDD, KWLF, KXLR

History
- First air date: October 30, 1939
- Call sign meaning: "Key For Alaska's Riches"

Technical information
- Licensing authority: FCC
- Facility ID: 6438
- Class: A
- Power: 10,000 watts
- Translator: 97.5 K248DK (Fairbanks)

Links
- Public license information: Public file; LMS
- Webcast: Listen live
- Website: kfarradio.com

KFAR (660 AM) is a commercial radio station licensed to Fairbanks, Alaska, United States, broadcasting a talk radio format. Founded in 1939 by industrialist Austin E. Lathrop, KFAR is the oldest radio station in Fairbanks and one of the oldest in Alaska. KFAR airs Fox News Radio throughout the day and carries national radio programs through Compass Media Networks, Premiere Networks, and Westwood One, among others. The station previously held longtime affiliations with the ABC Radio Network, Mutual Broadcasting System and the previous incarnation of Westwood One.

Since adopting the news/talk format during the 1980s, KFAR has had a long-standing commitment to airing locally produced talk radio programming; the station turned down The Rush Limbaugh Show when it was originally offered in favor of local programming. KFAR is currently the only news/talk station in Fairbanks to produce local call-in talk shows. Their primary competitor, KFBX, airs locally produced news and public affairs programming (on weekday morning drive and midday, and on Sunday morning, respectively), but no local talk shows. To drive home this distinction, KFAR makes heavy use of the slogan Local Talk Radio. Problem Corner (which has aired on the station since 1961), patriots lament show and The Michael Dukes Show comprise a total of 4 hours of airtime each weekday. KFAR has also aired a succession of local talk shows on Saturday mornings.

== History ==
KFAR was founded in 1939 by Austin E. Lathrop. The station marked his entry into broadcasting, as Lathrop continued to diversify and expand his business empire throughout the Alaska Territory. Lathrop hired engineer Stanton Bennett to build the station. Bennett, in turn, recommended that Lathrop hire a young engineer he worked with in Oregon named Augie Hiebert, who would later become influential in starting Lathrop's second radio station, KENI.

For most of the station's early existence, its studio was in the Lathrop Building in downtown Fairbanks. The station shared space in the building with other Lathrop enterprises, such as the Fairbanks Daily News-Miner. Its transmitter was on Farmers Loop Road, northeast of the University of Alaska, on a tract of land owned by Lathrop (around which the Fairbanks Golf and Country Club was later built). On the radio dial, it was originally on 610 kHz and moved to 660 kHz in 1956.

Following Lathrop's death in 1950, his numerous businesses continued to be run by his business associates under the corporate umbrella of The Lathrop Company, with the radio stations under subsidiary Midnight Sun Broadcasting Company. One of those associates, Alvin O. "Al" Bramstedt, purchased the Lathrop broadcasting holdings in 1960. Changing the name slightly to Midnight Sun Broadcasters, Bramstedt and his company operated the station throughout the 1960s and 1970s. Midnight Sun also operated sister station KFAR television on channel 2, with much cooperation and intermingling of on-air personnel evident.

Bramstedt retired and sold off his holdings in the early 1980s. The partnership of Bill Walley, Edward A. Merdes and Louis Frank Delong, doing business as Borealis Broadcasters, purchased the station. They would also launch KWLF during this time period.

The station was later owned by New Northwest Broadcasters, which purchased Borealis. It is currently owned by Rob Ingstad, through licensee Rob Ingstad Licenses, LLC, and goes by the branding of The Radio Station. Perry Walley, the company's general manager, is the son of Bill Walley and grew up around the station, as did his brother Terry, who is the general manager of rival broadcaster Tanana Valley Television.
