= KTZN =

- Anchorage, Alaska; United States
- Frequency: 550 kHz
- Branding: Fox Sports 550 The Zone

Programming
- Format: Sports
- Affiliations: Fox Sports Radio

Ownership
- Owner: iHeartMedia, Inc.; (iHM Licenses, LLC)
- Sister stations: KASH-FM, KBFX, KENI, KGOT, KYMG

History
- First air date: 1948
- Former call signs: KENI (1948–1998)
- Call sign meaning: "The Zone"

Technical information
- Licensing authority: FCC
- Facility ID: 12967
- Class: B
- Power: 5,000 watts
- Transmitter coordinates: 61°09′56″N 149°49′41.9″W
- Repeater: 101.3 KGOT-HD2 (Anchorage)

Links
- Public license information: Public file; LMS
- Webcast: Listen live (via iHeartRadio)
- Website: 550thezone.iheart.com

KTZN (550 AM "Fox Sports 550 The Zone") is a commercial radio station licensed to Anchorage, Alaska, United States. The station is owned by iHeartMedia, Inc. Its studios are located at Dimond Center in Anchorage, and its transmitter is located off Dowling Road in Southeast Anchorage. The station was once an affiliate of ESPN Radio until June 24, 2023, when it switched to Fox Sports Radio.

Previous logo

KENI ran a longtime Top 40 music format from the 1950s until 1986. The station ran an adult contemporary format for another few years afterward until dropping music for its then-current news/talk format in 1988. Ten years later in 1998, both KENI and KYAK swapped frequencies.
