= KWDD =

Radio station in Fairbanks, Alaska

Fairbanks, Alaska; United States
- Broadcast area: Fairbanks, Alaska
- Frequency: 94.3 (MHz)
- Branding: Wild 94.3

Programming
- Format: Country

Ownership
- Owner: Tor Ingstad; (Tor Ingstad Licenses, LLC)
- Sister stations: KCBF, KFAR, KXLR, KWLF, KTDZ

Technical information
- Licensing authority: FCC
- Facility ID: 190239
- Class: C1
- ERP: 28,000 watts
- HAAT: 233 meters
- Transmitter coordinates: 64°55′21″N 147°42′55″W

Links
- Public license information: Public file; LMS
- Webcast: Listen Live
- Website: http://www.wild943.com

KWDD (94.3 FM, "Wild 94.3") is a commercial radio station in Fairbanks, Alaska. KWDD debuted on November 4, 2012, playing a country music format.
