= KYMG =

Coordinates: 61.166°N 149.828°W

- Anchorage, Alaska; United States
- Broadcast area: Anchorage, Alaska
- Frequency: 98.9 MHz
- Branding: Magic 98.9

Programming
- Format: Adult contemporary
- Affiliations: Premiere Networks

Ownership
- Owner: iHeartMedia, Inc.; (iHM Licenses, LLC)
- Sister stations: KASH-FM, KBFX, KENI, KGOT, KTZN

History
- First air date: January 1, 1989
- Former call signs: KYMG (CP, 1988-1989); KYGL (CP, 1989)

Technical information
- Licensing authority: FCC
- Facility ID: 12514
- Class: C1
- ERP: 100,000 watts
- HAAT: −46 meters (−151 ft)

Links
- Public license information: Public file; LMS
- Webcast: Listen live (via iHeartRadio)
- Website: magic989fm.iheart.com

KYMG (98.9 FM) is a commercial adult contemporary music radio station in Anchorage, Alaska. It is owned by iHeartMedia, Inc.. Its studios are located at Dimond Center in Anchorage, and its transmitter is located off Dowling Road in Southeast Anchorage.
