= KKED =

Radio station in Fairbanks, Alaska

Coordinates: 64.915°N 147.650°W

- Fairbanks, Alaska; United States
- Broadcast area: Fairbanks, Alaska
- Frequency: 104.7 MHz
- Branding: Alt 104.7

Programming
- Format: Alternative rock
- Affiliations: Compass Media Networks; Premiere Networks

Ownership
- Owner: iHeartMedia; (iHM Licenses, LLC)
- Sister stations: KAKQ-FM, KFBX, KIAK-FM

History
- First air date: October 1, 1962 (license, as KUAC in College, Alaska, license moved to Fairbanks on March 9, 1976); June 22, 1998
- Former call signs: KUAC (1962–1977); KUAC-FM (1977–August 1997); KUAC (August 1997); KUAB (August 1997–1998)
- Former frequencies: 104.9 MHz (1962–1968)
- Call sign meaning: K K EDge (former branding)

Technical information
- Licensing authority: FCC
- Facility ID: 69120
- Class: C1
- ERP: 46,000 watts
- HAAT: 174 meters (571 ft)

Links
- Public license information: Public file; LMS
- Webcast: Listen Live
- Website: alt1047.iheart.com

KKED (104.7 FM) is an alternative rock radio station in Fairbanks, Alaska. The station is owned by iHeartMedia.

== History ==
The KKED license traces its roots to the oldest FM radio station in Interior Alaska. On October 1, 1962, the University of Alaska Fairbanks launched KUAC, the first public radio station in the state of Alaska, at 104.9 FM. It replaced an older carrier current station on the campus. In July 1968, the station moved to 104.7 MHz and increased the effective radiated power of its transmitter atop the Student Union Building to 10,500 watts.

Until 1982, the portion of the FM band below 100 MHz, including the typical noncommercial educational reserved band of 88–92 MHz, was reserved in Alaska for telecommunications purposes. As a result, KUAC, as well as other public radio stations in Alaska such as KSKA, operated on licenses that, if sold, could be converted to commercial operation. In 1995, the station landed a $178,000 federal grant to build a new, more powerful facility broadcasting with 38,000 watts at 89.9 MHz—in the reserved band—atop the Ester Dome. By comparison, the 104.7 facility was atop the shorter Bender Mountain at 10,000 watts. 89.9 MHz, bearing the call letters KUAB, came to air in April 1997 while the 104.7 studio-transmitter link was broken.

The new facility in the reserved band opened up the ability for the University of Alaska Fairbanks to sell the 104.7 license, which traded call letters to become KUAB, to a commercial buyer. Capstar, a forerunner to iHeartMedia, acquired the facility for $205,000 in February 1998. On June 22, the frequency became a commercial alternative rock outlet known as "The Edge"; the call letters changed to KKED on July 10.

The "Edge" moniker was used until 2016, when the station rebranded as Alt 104.7, retaining the alternative format.

== Programming ==
KKED has no local air talent. Its personalities are syndicated through the internal Premium Choice service.
