= KBFX (FM) =

Classic rock radio station in Anchorage, Alaska, United States

- Anchorage, Alaska; United States
- Broadcast area: Anchorage metropolitan area
- Frequency: 100.5 MHz
- Branding: 100.5 The Fox

Programming
- Format: Classic rock
- Affiliations: United Stations Radio Networks

Ownership
- Owner: iHeartMedia, Inc.; (iHM Licenses, LLC)
- Sister stations: KASH-FM, KENI, KGOT, KTZN, KYMG

History
- First air date: 1978
- Former call signs: KHVN (1978-?); KBCN (?-1985); KKGR (1985–1987); KENI-FM (1987–1989)
- Call sign meaning: "Fox"

Technical information
- Licensing authority: FCC
- Facility ID: 12962
- Class: C3
- ERP: 25,000 watts
- HAAT: 53 meters (174 ft)
- Transmitter coordinates: 61.1972°N 149.8775°W

Links
- Public license information: Public file; LMS
- Webcast: Listen live (via iHeartRadio)
- Website: 1005thefox.iheart.com

KBFX (100.5 FM, "100.5 The Fox") is a commercial radio station licensed to Anchorage, Alaska, United States. Owned by iHeartMedia, Inc., it features a classic rock format, with studios at Dimond Center in Anchorage and transmitter sited atop the Denali Tower North south of downtown.

== History ==
The station began in 1978 as KHVN, playing a religious format. It underwent several changes in both format and callsigns throughout the late 1970s and 1980s.

KBFX debuted in 1989 as "100.5 The Fox", playing the strict version of Jacobs Media's classic rock format.

Programming was initially run by Dave Moore, who had studied the format with Fred Jacobs at its inception. Staff included afternoon deejay CC Ryder (who won a small market Marconi Award for her work), evening deejay T-bone, and former WNCX Cleveland deejay Rick Rydell (hired in 1990).

Moore was replaced by Jack Hicks from KQRS-FM Minneapolis, then three months later Hicks returned to Minnesota and was replaced by local broadcaster Devan Mitchell.

During Mitchell's watch, a competitor in the same format ("Arrow 102") came on the air for the first time since 1989.

For many years, the station has aired the Woody and Wilcox show in morning drive. Originally the show was based at KBFX. Since 2010, the show has broadcast from WEND in Charlotte, NC and is syndicated back to KBFX.
