= KWLF =

Radio station in Fairbanks, Alaska

- Fairbanks, Alaska; United States
- Broadcast area: Fairbanks metropolitan area
- Frequency: 98.1 MHz
- Branding: K-Wolf 98.1

Programming
- Language: English
- Format: Contemporary hit radio
- Affiliations: Compass Media Networks; Premiere Networks; Westwood One

Ownership
- Owner: Tor Ingstad; (Tor Ingstad Licenses, LLC)
- Sister stations: KCBF; KFAR; KTDZ; KXLR; KWDD

History
- First air date: 1987
- Former call signs: KECA (1985–1986)

Technical information
- Licensing authority: FCC
- Facility ID: 6439
- Class: C1
- ERP: 28,000 watts
- HAAT: 233 meters (764 ft)
- Transmitter coordinates: 64°55′18.9″N 147°43′3.7″W

Links
- Public license information: Public file; LMS
- Webcast: Listen live
- Website: kwolf981.com

KWLF (98.1 MHz, "K-Wolf 98.1") is a commercial FM radio station in Fairbanks, Alaska. KWLF airs a contemporary hit radio music format.

Former logo
