= KTDZ =

Radio station in College–Fairbanks, Alaska

College, Alaska; United States
- Broadcast area: Fairbanks metropolitan area
- Frequency: 103.9 MHz
- Branding: Ted-FM

Programming
- Format: Adult hits

Ownership
- Owner: Rob Ingstad; (Rob Ingstad Licenses, LLC)
- Sister stations: KCBF, KFAR, KXLR, KWLF, KWDD

History
- First air date: September 6, 1984
- Former call signs: KSUA (1984–1996); KUWL (1996–2006)
- Former frequencies: 91.5 MHz
- Call sign meaning: Ted

Technical information
- Licensing authority: FCC
- Facility ID: 69405
- Class: C1
- ERP: 28,000 watts
- HAAT: 233 meters (764 ft)
- Transmitter coordinates: 64°55′18.9″N 147°43′3.7″W

Links
- Public license information: Public file; LMS
- Webcast: Listen live
- Website: mytedfm.com

KTDZ (103.9 MHz) is a commercial FM radio station licensed to College, Alaska, and broadcasting to the Fairbanks metropolitan area. It is owned by Rob Ingstad, through licensee Rob Ingstad Licenses, LLC, and airs an adult hits radio format, known as "Ted-FM." The studios are on 9th Avenue in Fairbanks.

KTDZ has an effective radiated power (ERP) of 28,000 watts as a Class C1 station. The transmitter is on Crestline Drive at Skyline Drive in College.

== History ==
The station signed on the air on September 6, 1984. Its original call sign was KSUA. It aired an album rock format and was an affiliate of the NBC Source Network. The power was only 1,000 watts and the owner was Student Media, Inc. Much of its staff were students at the nearby University of Alaska Fairbanks.

In 1996, the station's call letters changed to KUWL, which was a professionally staffed station playing country music. The power increased to 3,000 watts and the owner was Borealis Broadcasting. The station moved its studios to Fairbanks.

In 2006, the station flipped to its current format under new owner Rob Ingstad. Its call sign changed to KTDZ and its moniker became "Ted-FM."
