= KENI =

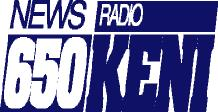
- Anchorage, Alaska; United States
- Broadcast area: Southcentral Alaska
- Frequency: 650 kHz
- Branding: NewsRadio 650

Programming
- Format: Talk radio
- Affiliations: Fox News Radio; ABC News Radio; Premiere Networks; Westwood One

Ownership
- Owner: iHeartMedia, Inc.; (iHM Licenses, LLC)
- Sister stations: KASH-FM, KBFX, KGOT, KTZN, KYMG

History
- First air date: 1948
- Former call signs: KYAK (1948–1998)
- Former frequencies: 550 kHz (1948–1998)
- Call sign meaning: Kenai

Technical information
- Licensing authority: FCC
- Facility ID: 12516
- Class: A
- Power: 50,000 watts (unlimited)
- Transmitter coordinates: 61°9′56″N 149°49′41.9″W

Links
- Public license information: Public file; LMS
- Webcast: Listen live (via iHeartRadio)
- Website: 650keni.iheart.com

KENI (650 AM) is a radio station broadcasting a talk format. Licensed to Anchorage, Alaska, United States, the station serves the south-central Alaska area. The station is currently owned by iHeartMedia, Inc.. Its studios are located at Dimond Center in Anchorage, and its transmitter is located off Dowling Road in Southeast Anchorage. KENI is a clear-channel, Class A, 50,000-watt station.

== History ==
KENI began broadcasting May 2, 1948, on 550 kHz with 5 kW power (full-time), on what is now KTZN. It was operated by Midnight Sun Broadcasting Company. The Callsign & intellectual property moved to 650 kHz in March 1998. In August 1995, the station, as KYAK, was the Anchorage affiliate of the Radio AAHS children's format.

Anchorage-based concert promoter and musician, Dwight Pullen, hosted a weekly country music variety show called The Whitey Pullen Show from the KENI Radio Building in 1958.
