= Dimond Center =

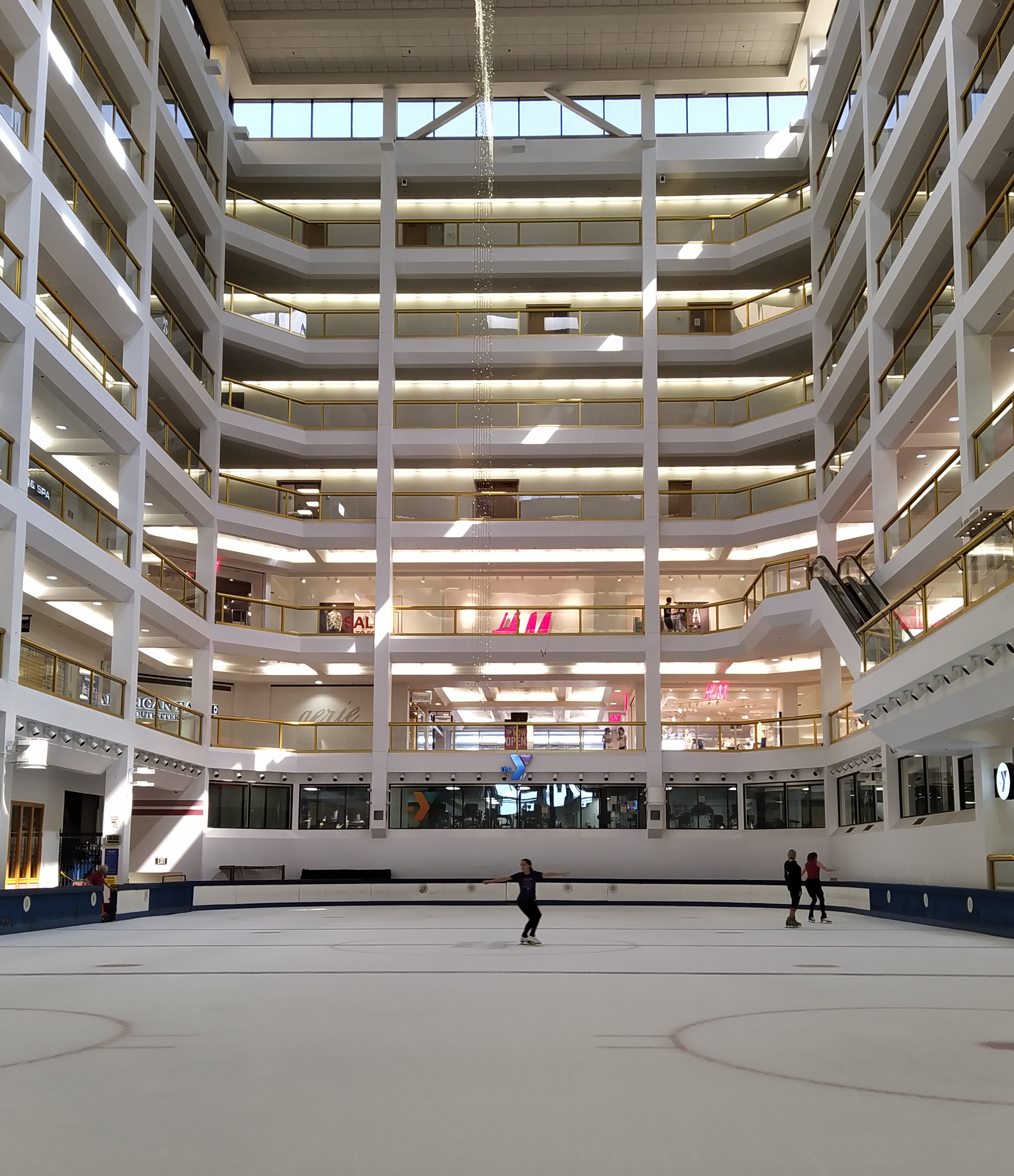
- View looking east of the ice rink and office tower
- Location: Anchorage, Alaska, United States
- Coordinates: 61.143116°N 149.86815°W
- Address: 800 E Dimond Blvd
- Owner: Ashlock family
- Stores and services: 200+
- Anchor tenants: 3
- Floor area: 728,000 square feet (67,600 m^{2})
- Floors: 2 main
- Parking: Free, uncovered
- Website: dimondcenter.com

The Dimond Center is a regional shopping mall in Anchorage, Alaska, United States, located on the southwest corner of East Dimond Boulevard and the Old Seward Highway in south Anchorage. This is the largest enclosed mall in the state of Alaska, though the open-air Tikahtnu Commons in NE Anchorage has a greater GLA.

The 728,000 square feet (67,600 m^{2}) mall is anchored by Best Buy, Dave & Buster's and a 9-screen Regal Cinemas theater. In total the Dimond Center contains over 200 stores, restaurants and services, including a six-story office tower at the mall's southeast corner. The lower level in the office tower also contains a small food court, a bowling alley, and a health club, all arrayed around an ice skating rink. The office tower is home to the Anchorage branch of iHeartMedia (formerly Clear Channel Radio), including the studios of radio stations KASH, KBFX, KENI, KGOT, KTZN and KYMG.

== History ==
The section line road leading south from Anchorage to the rural settlements of Rabbit Creek and Potter became the Seward Highway in the early 1950s and the Old Seward Highway about 20 years later with the construction of a 4-lane freeway slightly to the east. The Old Seward Highway formed the backbone of what became south Anchorage, both in terms of access to residential subdivisions and homesteads, as well as businesses which catered to both nearby residents and highway travelers.

As south Anchorage began to grow, the intersections of the Old Seward Highway with Dowling Road and with O'Malley Road originally began to develop as commercial hubs for the area. This changed after Larry Carr and Barney Gottstein acquired and subsequently developed large amounts of acreage throughout Anchorage, mostly with intent to expand the Carrs grocery chain. Their initial foray into south Anchorage occurred at the corner of Dimond and Old Seward, across Dimond Boulevard from the east end of what became the Dimond Center. This turned what was originally intended as industrial land into retail land, no doubt helped by the development boom associated with the trans-Alaska pipeline during the 1970s.

Dimond Center opened in 1977 with Safeway and Pay 'n Save as its anchor stores. It underwent a major expansion in 1981, adding a replacement Pay 'n Save drug store and other stores. In 1982, a competing development, the Great Northern Mall, was announced for the tract of land across the Old Seward Highway from the mall. Owing to a real estate-related economic crash which befell Anchorage during most of the middle and late 1980s, only a small portion of that proposed development was ever constructed, mostly near the Dimond Boulevard and New Seward Highway intersection. This tract was fully developed during the 1990s centered on big-box stores, which supplement the Dimond Center as a destination for shoppers from a vast geographical area.

A refrigerant leak on May 20, 1991 resulted in the death of the skating rink's assistant manager and injured 33 others, including six whose injuries required hospitalization. A movie theater was added in 1996. The Dimond Center Hotel was later built on the mall's southwest corner, which was largely financed by Seldovia's Native corporation, Seldovia Native Association, Inc. The Samson-Dimond Library, a branch of the Anchorage Public Library and an original tenant of the mall, closed at the end of 2010 due to budget cuts.

By 2020, Dimond Center has continued to evolve in order to meet this constantly changing lifestyle and needs, wants, and experiences of Alaskan community. This includes addition of electric vehicle charging stations and welcoming new tenants such as lululemon, and Cinnabon.
