= MVS Radio =

Mexican radio broadcaster

MVS Radio are a group of four international Spanish-language radio networks owned by the mass media conglomerate MVS Comunicaciones. The group of radio networks consists of Exa FM, La Mejor FM, Globo and MVS Noticias and are broadcast in a various Latin American countries including Argentina, Costa Rica, Ecuador, El Salvador, Guatemala, Honduras, Mexico and the United States.

== Exa FM ==
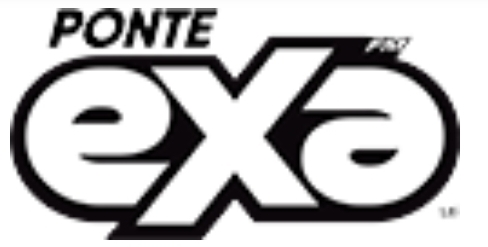

Exa FM is an international network radio format of MVS Radio in Spanish-language Top 40 outlets broadcasting throughout Mexico, Guatemala, Honduras, Costa Rica, El Salvador, Ecuador and the United States.

Stations covering Exa FM include:

=== Mexico ===
- XHVW-FM 90.5 MHz - Acámbaro, Guanajuato
- XHNQ-FM 99.3 MHz - Acapulco, Guerrero
- XHAGC-FM 97.3 MHz - Aguascalientes, Aguascalientes
- XHMI-FM 100.3 MHz - Campeche, Campeche
- XHEOF-FM 101.9 MHz - Celaya, Guanajuato
- XHLO-FM 100.9 MHz - Chihuahua, Chihuahua
- XHDH-FM 91.5 MHz - Ciudad Acuña, Coahuila
- XHIT-FM 99.7 MHz / XEIT-AM 1070 kHz - Ciudad del Carmen, Campeche
- XHPX-FM 98.3 MHz - Ciudad Juárez, Chihuahua for El Paso
- XHRLM-FM 91.9 MHz - Ciudad Mante, Tamaulipas
- XHOX-FM 99.3 MHz - Ciudad Obregón, Sonora
- XHBJ-FM 94.5 MHz - Ciudad Victoria, Tamaulipas
- XHCOC-FM 99.7 MHz - Colima, Colima
- XHPT-FM 91.3 MHz - Córdoba Veracruz
- XHCT-FM 95.7 MHz - Cuernavaca, Morelos
- XHESA-FM 101.7 MHz - Culiacán, Sinaloa
- XHCAV-FM 101.3 MHz - Durango, Durango
- XHADA-FM 104.1 MHz - Ensenada, Baja California
- XHFRE-FM 100.5 MHz - Fresnillo, Zacatecas
- XHMA-FM 101.1 MHz - Guadalajara, Jalisco
- XHGSE-FM 98.1 MHz - Guasave, Sinaloa
- XHNY-FM 93.5 MHz - Irapuato, Guanajuato
- XHMD-FM 104.1 MHz - León, Guanajuato
- XHCCAC-FM 103.9 MHz - Los Cabos, Baja California Sur
- XHMPM-FM 98.9 MHz - Los Mochis, Sinaloa
- XHOPE-FM 89.7 MHz - Mazatlán, Sinaloa
- XHMRA-FM 99.3 MHz - Mérida, Yucatán
- XHJC-FM 91.5 MHz - Mexicali, Baja California
- XHEXA-FM 104.9 MHz - Mexico City
- XHWGR-FM 101.1 MHz - Monclova, Coahuila
- XHSR-FM 97.3 MHz - Monterrey, Nuevo León
- XHKW-FM 89.3 MHz - Morelia, Michoacán
- XHQT-FM 102.7 MHz - Nogales, Sonora
- XHNR-FM 98.5 MHz - Oaxaca, Oaxaca
- XHPNS-FM 107.1 MHz- Piedras Negras, Coahuila
- XHRIC-FM 101.9 MHz - Poza Rica, Veracruz
- XHJE-FM 94.1 MHz - Puebla, Puebla
- XHCCBB-FM 89.9 MHz - Puerto Vallarta, Jalisco
- XHOE-FM 95.5 MHz - Querétaro, Querétaro
- XHVI-FM 99.1 MHz - San Juan del Río, Querétaro
- XHESL-FM 102.1 MHz - San Luis Potosí, San Luis Potosí
- XHOX-FM 95.3 MHz - Tampico, Tamaulipas
- XHWJ-FM 102.9 MHz - Tehuacán, Puebla
- XHGLX-FM 91.7 MHz - Tijuana, Baja California
- XHMP-FM 95.5 MHz - Torreón, Coahuila
- XHPTUX-FM 101.3 MHz - Tuxtepec, Oaxaca
- XHCQ-FM 98.5 MHz - Tuxtla Gutiérrez, Chiapas
- XHPS-FM 93.3 MHz - Veracruz, Veracruz
- XHPZAM-FM 98.1 MHz - Zamora, Michoacán

=== Costa Rica ===
- 102.7 MHz - San José, Costa Rica

=== Ecuador ===
- 92.5 MHz - Quito
- 89.7 MHz - Riobamba
- 90.1 MHz - Tulcán

=== El Salvador ===
- 91.3 MHz - San Salvador

=== Guatemala ===
- 90.7 MHz - Escuintla
- 101.7 MHz - Guatemala City
- 97.9 MHz - Izabal
- 106.3 MHz - Jutiapa
- 102.3 MHz - Oriente
- 97.1 MHz - Quetzaltenango
- 97.5 MHz - Sur Occidente
- 102.3 MHz - Zacapa

=== Honduras ===
- 93.9 MHz - La Ceiba
- 100.5 MHz - Tegucigalpa
- 89.3 MHz - San Pedro Sula
- 89.3 MHz - Puerto Cortés
- 95.9 MHz - Choluteca

=== United States ===
- KXLI 94.5 MHz - Las Vegas, Nevada

==== Former Stations ====
===== Mexico =====
- XHNNO-FM 99.9 MHz - Agua Prieta, Sonora
- XHWO-FM 97.7 MHz / XEWO-AM 1020 kHz - Chetumal, Quintana Roo
- XHQAA-FM 99.3 MHz / XEQAA-AM 560 kHz - Chetumal, Quintana Roo
- XHZN-FM 104.5 MHz / XEZN-AM 780 kHz - Celaya, Guanajuato
- XHRG-FM 95.5 MHz - Ciudad Acuña, Coahuila
- XHTD-FM 101.7 MHz - Coatzacoalcos, Veracruz
- XHCTS-FM 95.7 MHz - Comitán, Chiapas
- XHBH-FM 98.5 MHz / XEBH-AM 590 kHz - Hermosillo, Sonora
- XHAH-FM 90.1 MHz - Juchitán, Oaxaca
- XHLP-FM 89.9 MHz - La Piedad, Michoacán
- XHMLS-FM 91.3 MHz - Matamoros, Tamaulipas
- XHRV-FM 89.5 MHz - Matamoros, Tamaulipas
- XHMRL-FM 91.5 MHz - Morelia, Michoacán
- XHBK-FM 95.7 MHz / XEBK-AM 1340 kHz - Nuevo Laredo, Tamaulipas
- XHPCA-FM 106.1 MHz - Pachuca, Hidalgo
- XHRE-FM 105.5 MHz - Piedras Negras, Coahuila
- XHPBA-FM 98.7 MHz - Puebla, Puebla
- XHCJX-FM 99.9 MHz - Puerto Vallarta, Jalisco
- XHOZ-FM 94.7 MHz - Querétaro, Querétaro
- XHRR-FM 102.5 MHz - Reynosa, Tamaulipas
- XHRP-FM 94.7 MHz - Saltillo, Coahuila
- XHMIG-FM 105.9 MHz - San Miguel de Allende, Guanajuato
- XHOD-FM 96.9 MHz - San Luis Potosí, San Luis Potosí
- XHTAC-FM 91.5 MHz / XETAC-AM 1000 kHz - Tapachula, Chiapas
- XHTXO-FM 92.9 MHz - Taxco, Guerrero
- XHTE-FM 99.9 MHz - Tehuacán, Puebla
- XHUH-FM 96.9 MHz / XEUH-AM 1320 kHz - Tuxtepec, Oaxaca
- XHUF-FM 100.5 MHz / XEUF-AM 610 kHz - Uruapan, Michoacán
- XHKV-FM 88.5 MHz / XEKV-AM 740 kHz - Villahermosa, Tabasco
- XHWA-FM 98.5 MHz - Xalapa, Veracruz

===== Dominican Republic =====
- HIK52 96.9 MHz - Santo Domingo

===== Ecuador =====
- 93.9 MHz - Ibarra, Ecuador

===== Panama =====
- 88.5 MHz - Panama, Panama

===== United States =====
- KDRX 106.9 MHz - Del Rio, Texas
- KEXA 93.9 MHz - King City, California
- KRGX 95.1 MHz - Rio Grande City, Texas
- KYZZ 97.9 MHz - Salinas, California
- 87.7 MHz - Uvalde, Texas

== La Mejor FM ==
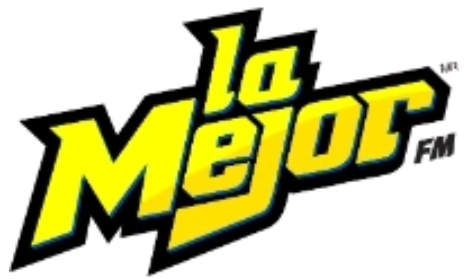

La Mejor FM is a network radio format of MVS Radio in Regional Mexican outlets broadcasting throughout the Mexico and portions of Costa Rica and the United States.

Stations covering La Mejor FM include:

=== Mexico ===
- XHAK-FM 89.7 MHz - Acámbaro, Guanajuato
- XHAGT-FM 93.7 MHz - Aguascalientes, Aguascalientes
- XHSE-FM 100.1 MHz - Acapulco, Guerrero
- XHEFG-FM 89.1 MHz - Celaya, Guanajuato
- XHHEM-FM 103.7 MHz - Chihuahua, Chihuahua
- XHHAC-FM 100.7 MHz - Ciudad Acuña, Coahuila
- XHRAW-FM 93.9 MHz - Ciudad Miguel Alemán, Tamaulipas
- XHVJS-FM 103.3 MHz - Ciudad Obregón, Sonora
- XHUU-FM 92.5 MHz / XEUU-AM 1080 kHz - Colima, Colima
- XHPG-FM 92.1 MHz - Córdoba, Veracruz
- XHVZ-FM 97.3 MHz - Cuernavaca, Morelos
- XHECQ-FM 104.1 MHz - Culiacán, Sinaloa
- XHDGO-FM 103.7 MHz / XEDGO-AM 760 kHz - Durango, Durango
- XHENA-FM 103.3 MHz - Ensenada, Baja California
- XHPFCP-FM 95.1 MHz - Felipe Carrillo Puerto, Quintana Roo
- XHEMA-FM 107.9 MHz / XEMA-AM 690 kHz - Fresnillo, Zacatecas
- XHRO-FM 95.5 MHz - Guadalajara, Jalisco
- XHBH-FM 98.5 MHz - Hermosillo, Sonora
- XHOU-FM 105.3 MHz - Huajuapan de León, Oaxaca
- XHSO-FM 99.9 MHz - León, Guanajuato
- XHCCAD-FM 89.9 MHz / XHCCAB-FM 102.3 MHz - Los Cabos, Baja California Sur
- XHHS-FM 90.9 MHz / XEHS-AM 540 kHz - Los Mochis, Sinaloa
- XHECS-FM 96.1 MHz - Manzanillo, Colima
- XHHW-FM 102.7 MHz / XEHW-AM 600 kHz - Mazatlán, Sinaloa
- XHQW-FM 90.1 MHz - Mérida, Yucatán
- XHVG-FM 103.3 MHz - Mexicali, Baja California
- XERC-FM 97.7 MHz - Mexico City
- XHEMF-FM 96.3 MHz - Monclova, Coahuila
- XHSRO-FM 92.5 MHz - Monterrey, Nuevo León
- XHNGS-FM 96.7 MHz - Nogales, Sonora
- XHZB-FM 101.7 MHz - Oaxaca, Oaxaca
- XHSL-FM 99.1 MHz - Piedras Negras, Coahuila
- XHPW-FM 94.7 MHz - Poza Rica, Veracruz
- XHEDO-FM 94.1 MHz - Puerto Escondido, Oaxaca
- XHCJX-FM 99.9 MHz - Puerto Vallarta, Jalisco
- XHXE-FM 92.7 MHz - Querétaro, Querétaro
- XEFD-AM 590 kHz - Reynosa, Tamaulipas
- XHGX-FM 92.5 MHz - San Luis de la Paz, Guanajuato
- XHWZ-FM 90.9 MHz - San Luis Potosí, San Luis Potosí
- XHJT-FM 100.1 MHz - Tampico, Tamaulipas
- XHGY-FM 100.7 MHz - Tehuacán, Puebla
- XHTIM-FM 90.7 MHz - Tijuana, Baja California
- XHPE-FM 97.1 MHz - Torreón, Coahuila
- XHXP-FM 106.5 MHz - Tuxtepec, Oaxaca
- XHVE-FM 100.5 MHz - Veracruz, Veracruz

=== Costa Rica ===
- TIAAC FM 99.1 MHz - San José, Costa Rica

=== United States ===
- KMHR 950 AM / K252FA 98.3 FM - Boise, Idaho
- KADD 93.5 MHz - Bunkerville, Nevada
- KCOT 96.3 MHz - Cotulla, Texas
- WWFL 1340/ W241CR 96.1 MHz - Clermont, Florida
- KDYL (AM) 1060 MHz - South Salt Lake, Utah
- KSUN 1400 kHz / K293CO 106.5 MHz - Phoenix, Arizona
- KEWP 103.5 MHz - Uvalde Estates, Texas
- KEYH 850/K283CH 104.5 MHz - Houston, Texas

==== Former stations ====
===== Mexico =====
- XHJY-FM 101.5 MHz - Autlán, Jalisco
- XHEZ-FM 90.7 MHz / XEEZ-AM 970 kHz - Caborca, Sonora
- XEOF-AM 740 kHz - Celaya, Guanajuato
- XHRG-FM 95.5 MHz - Ciudad Acuña, Coahuila
- XHPMOC-FM 104.9 MHz - Ciudad Cuauhtémoc, Chihuahua
- XHBCC-FM 100.5 MHz / XEBCC-AM 1030 kHz - Ciudad del Carmen, Campeche
- XHLAZ-FM 93.5 MHz - Ciudad Guzmán, Jalisco
- XHLUP-FM 89.1 MHz / XELUP-AM 1130 kHz - Compostela, Nayarit
- XHAG-FM 102.1 MHz - Córdoba, Veracruz
- XESA-AM 1260 kHz - Culiacán, Sinaloa
- XEHQ-AM 920 kHz - Hermosillo, Sonora
- XERJ-AM 1320 kHz - Mazatlán, Sinaloa
- XERRF-AM 860 kHz - Mérida, Yucatán
- XHYW-FM 106.7 MHz / XEYW-AM 760 kHz - Mérida, Yucatán
- XHCMS-FM 103.3 MHz - Mexicali, Baja California
- XHMVS-FM 102.5 MHz - Mexico City
- XEOC-AM 560 kHz - Mexico City
- XHMSN-FM 100.1 MHz - Montemorelos, Nuevo León
- XEZT-AM 1250 kHz - Puebla, Puebla
- XECJU-AM 590 kHz - Puerto Vallarta, Jalisco
- XHSHT-FM 102.5 MHz - Saltillo, Coahuila
- XHPM-FM 100.1 MHz - San Luis Potosí, San Luis Potosí
- XHSI-FM 94.5 MHz / XESI-AM 1240 kHz - Santiago Ixcuintla, Nayarit
- XHPTCS-FM 95.5 MHz - Tapachula, Chiapas
- XHHTY-FM 107.1 MHz - Tlapacoyan, Veracruz
- XHOCL-FM 99.3 MHz - Tijuana, Baja California for San Diego, California
- XHVV-FM 101.7 MHz - Tuxtla Gutiérrez, Chiapas
- XHMET-FM 91.9 MHz / XEMET-AM 570 kHz - Valladolid, Yucatán
- XHLI-FM 98.3 MHz - Villahermosa, Tabasco
- XHZHO-FM 98.5 MHz - Zihuatanejo, Guerrero
- XHLX-FM 95.1 MHz - Zitácuaro, Michoacán

===== Ecuador =====
- HCRA FM 103.9 MHz - Ibarra

===== El Salvador =====
- YSTN FM 98.9 MHz - San Salvador

===== United States =====
- WBZQ 1300 kHz - Huntington, Indiana
- KGDL 92.1 MHz - Trent, Texas
- KNNR 1400 kHz - Reno, Nevada
- KZAM 98.7 MHz - Pleasant Valley, Texas

== Globo ==
Radio station broadcasting contemporary music in Spanish and English.

Stations include:

=== Mexico ===
- XHPL-FM 99.7 MHz - Ciudad Acuña, Coahuila
- XHMAB-FM 101.3 MHz / XEMAB-AM 950 kHz - Ciudad del Carmen, Campeche
- XHAG-FM 102.1 MHz - Córdoba, Veracruz
- XHLC-FM 98.7 MHz - Guadalajara, Jalisco
- XHCCBE-FM 95.9 MHz - Maravatío, Michoacán
- XHMMS-FM 97.9 MHz - Mazatlán, Sinaloa
- XHPF-FM 101.9 MHz - Mexicali, Baja California
- XHJM-FM 88.1 MHz - Monterrey, Nuevo León
- XHVUC-FM 95.9 MHz - Piedras Negras, Coahuila
- XHPR-FM 102.7 MHz / XEPR-AM 1020 kHz - Poza Rica, Veracruz
- XHOCL-FM 99.3 MHz - Tijuana, Baja California
- XHTC-FM 91.1 MHz - Torreón, Coahuila
- XHZHO-FM 98.5 MHz - Zihuatanejo, Guerrero

=== Costa Rica ===
- 100.3 MHz - San José, Costa Rica

==== Former stations ====
===== Mexico =====
- XHNQ-FM 99.3 MHz - Acapulco, Guerrero
- XHAGC-FM 97.3 MHz - Aguascalientes, Aguascalientes
- XHLTZ-FM 106.1 MHz - Aguascalientes, Aguascalientes
- XHPX-FM 98.3 MHz - Ciudad Juárez, Chihuahua
- XHCT-FM 95.7 MHz - Cuernavaca, Morelos
- XHSC-FM 93.9 MHz - Guadalajara, Jalisco
- XEHQ-AM 590 kHz/920 kHz - Hermosillo, Sonora
- XHMD-FM 104.1 MHz - León, Guanajuato
- XEOY-FM 89.7 MHz - Mexico City
- XHMRD-FM 104.9 MHz - Mexico City
- XHSR-FM 97.3 MHz - Monterrey, Nuevo León
- XHNGS-FM 96.7 MHz - Nogales, Sonora
- XHARE-FM 97.7 MHz - Ojinaga, Chihuahua
- XHMJ-FM 97.9 MHz / XEMJ-AM 920 kHz - Piedras Negras, Coahuila
- XHRR-FM 102.5 MHz - Reynosa, Tamaulipas
- XHOD-FM 96.9 MHz - San Luis Potosí, San Luis Potosí
- XHPM-FM 100.1 MHz - San Luis Potosí, San Luis Potosí
- XHUH-FM 96.9 MHz - Tuxtepec, Oaxaca
- XHPS-FM 93.3 MHz - Veracruz, Veracruz

== Stereorey ==
A station broadcasting English-language music from the 1950s to the 2000s. Stereorey (Argentina) follows however the format of songs from the 1960s to the present, with American Hot Adult Contemporary music.

Stations broadcasting Stereorey include:

=== Mexico ===
- XHCAA-FM 100.9 MHz - Aguascalientes, Aguascalientes

=== Argentina ===
- 103.5 MHz - Eldorado, Misiones
- 102.7 MHz - Apóstoles, Misiones
- 94.3 MHz - Posadas, Misiones

==== Former stations ====
===== Mexico =====
- XHSE-FM 100.1 MHz - Acapulco, Guerrero
- XHAGT-FM 93.7 MHz - Aguascalientes, Aguascalientes
- XHEOF-FM 101.9 MHz - Celaya, Guanajuato
- XHPX-FM 98.3 MHz – Ciudad Juárez, Chihuahua
- XHVZ-FM 97.3 MHz - Cuernavaca, Morelos
- XHADA-FM 106.9 MHz - Ensenada, Baja California
- XHRO-FM 95.5 MHz - Guadalajara, Jalisco
- XHBH-FM 98.5 MHz / XEBH-AM 590 kHz - Hermosillo, Sonora
- XHSO-FM 99.9 MHz - León Guanajuato
- XHVG-FM 103.3 MHz - Mexicali, Baja California
- XHV-FM/XHMVS-FM 102.5 MHz - Mexico City
- XHSRO-FM 92.5 MHz - Monterrey, Nuevo León
- XHQT-FM 102.7 MHz - Nogales, Sonora
- XHRIC-FM 101.9 MHz - Poza Rica, Veracruz
- XHZM-FM 92.5 MHz - Puebla, Puebla
- XHCJX-FM 99.9 MHz - Puerto Vallarta, Jalisco
- XHPM-FM 100.1 MHz - San Luis Potosí, San Luis Potosí
- XHJT-FM 100.1 MHz - Tampico, Tamaulipas
- XHGLX-FM 91.7 MHz - Tijuana, Baja California
- XHVE-FM 100.5 MHz - Veracruz, Veracruz
- XEVT-AM 970 kHz - Villahermosa, Tabasco

== MVS Noticias ==
It broadcasts news and sports, and also broadcasts various music in English.

Stations broadcasting MVS Noticias include:

=== Mexico ===
- XEMX-AM 1120 kHz - Mexicali, Baja California
- XHMVS-FM 102.5 MHz - Mexico City

== Best FM ==
Radio station based on 1980s, 1990s music up to the present.

Stations include:

=== Costa Rica ===
- TIHBG FM 103.5 MHz - San José, Costa Rica

==== Former stations ====
===== Mexico =====
- XHSE-FM 100.1 MHz - Acapulco, Guerrero
- XHAGT-FM 93.7 MHz - Aguascalientes, Aguascalientes
- XHVZ-FM 97.3 MHz - Cuernavaca, Morelos
- XHADA-FM 106.9 MHz - Ensenada, Baja California
- XHRO-FM 95.5 MHz - Guadalajara, Jalisco
- XHSO-FM 99.9 MHz - León, Guanajuato
- XHVG-FM 103.3 MHz - Mexicali, Baja California
- XHMVS-FM 102.5 MHz - Mexico City
- XHSRO-FM 92.5 MHz - Monterrey, Nuevo León
- XHPM-FM 100.1 MHz - San Luis Potosí, San Luis Potosí
- XHJT-FM 100.1 MHz - Tampico, Tamaulipas
- XHVE-FM 100.5 MHz - Veracruz, Veracruz
