= XHPTUX-FM =

Radio station in San Juan Bautista Tuxtepec, Oaxaca

San Juan Bautista Tuxtepec, Oaxaca; Mexico
- Frequency: 101.3 MHz (HD Radio)
- Branding: Exa FM

Programming
- Format: Contemporary hit radio
- Affiliations: MVS Radio

Ownership
- Owner: Grupo Rojaz; (Radio Casandoo, S.A. de C.V.)
- Sister stations: XHPVTS-FM Villa Tututepec

History
- First air date: June 3, 2019
- Call sign meaning: "Tuxtepec"

Technical information
- Class: AA
- ERP: 5 kW
- HAAT: 36.9 m
- Transmitter coordinates: 18°06′25.6″N 96°08′5.2″W

Links
- Webcast: Listen live
- Website: exafm.com

XHPTUX-FM is a radio station on 101.3 FM in San Juan Bautista Tuxtepec, Oaxaca, Mexico. It is owned by Grupo Rojaz and carries the Exa FM national format from MVS Radio.

== History ==
XHPTUX was awarded in the IFT-4 radio auction of 2017. The initial winning bidder, Tecnoradio, paid 2.35 million pesos for the frequency, but was later disqualified nationwide. Radio Casandoo's third-place bid of 2.265 million pesos was accepted in Tecnoradio's station and the station signed on June 3, 2019, marking the beginning of serious commercial competition in Tuxtepec, which had previously been monopolized by the ORP stations (XHUH-FM and XHXP-FM).
