= XHOX-FM =

XHOX-FM may refer to:

- XHOX-FM (Sonora), a radio station in Ciudad Obregón, Sonora, Mexico
- XHOX-FM (Tamaulipas), a radio station in Tampico, Tamaulipas, Mexico
