= XHSRO-FM =

Radio station in Monterrey, Nuevo León, Mexico

- Monterrey, Nuevo León; Mexico
- Frequency: 92.5 MHz
- Branding: La Mejor FM

Programming
- Format: Regional Mexican

Ownership
- Owner: MVS Radio; (Stereorey México, S.A.)
- Sister stations: XHJM-FM, XHSR-FM

History
- First air date: April 15, 1967
- Call sign meaning: "Stereo"

Technical information
- Licensing authority: CRT
- Class: C1
- ERP: 95.52 kW
- HAAT: 245.99 meters (807.1 ft)
- Transmitter coordinates: 25°37′31.7″N 100°19′00.9″W

Links
- Website: lamejor.com.mx/monterrey

XHSRO-FM is a station in Monterrey, Nuevo León, Mexico. It broadcasts on 92.5 FM from Cerro el Mirador and carries the La Mejor FM regional Mexican format from MVS Radio.

== History ==
=== Stereorey ===
In 1965, Joaquín Vargas Gómez, the founder of MVS, was driving in a car in the United States and was surprised by the increased sound quality available on the then-new FM band. The quality available on FM inspired him to start a new FM radio station in Monterrey. On April 15, 1967, XHSRO-FM, the first stereo FM radio station in Mexico, hit the air. While FM radio had already entered the Mexican market on stations such as the short-lived XHFM-FM and XEOY-FM, both in Mexico City, XHSRO and its format would help to encourage the development of FM radio across Mexico.

The format chosen by Várgas Gómez for this pioneering venture was dubbed Stereorey, for stereo and Monterrey. It consisted of contemporary music in English. It promptly began to expand; the second city to get Stereorey was Guadalajara, XHRO-FM 95.5. Then came Mexico City with XHV-FM 102.5, while the fourth Stereorey station was León, on XHSO-FM 99.9. (MVS still owns the stations, which, except for Mexico City, now broadcast the La Mejor FM format.)

Over time, and particularly after 1990, Stereorey stations also had a considerable news presence. Para Empezar, a morning news program with Pedro Ferriz de Con, soon expanded to evenings. However, the news content began to proliferate to the point where what had been conceived as a music station now carried 7 hours of news on weekdays.

The voice of Stereorey was Ken Smith, who from 1967 until his death in 1990 recorded all the station identifications and promos used on Stereorey's stations across Mexico. Stereorey's importance in MVS's history is such that all of MVS Radio's owned and operated station concessions are held by Stereorey México, S.A.

=== Format changes in the 2000s ===
Stereorey ended its run on XHSRO on September 2, 2002 to give way to Best FM, which consisted of newer contemporary music in English. Whereas Stereorey's catalog still had 1960s music in it, Best FM was newer, with more rock and less easy listening. In addition, the news programming was reduced.

This format, in turn, was replaced in January 2005 with La Mejor, an MVS national format of grupera music.
