= XHOPE-FM =

Radio station in Mazatlán, Sinaloa, Mexico

- Mazatlán, Sinaloa; Mexico
- Frequency: 89.7 MHz
- Branding: Exa FM

Programming
- Format: Spanish & English Top 40 (CHR)
- Affiliations: MVS Radio

Ownership
- Owner: Grupo Promomedios; (Radio Ope de Mazatlán, S.A. de C.V.)
- Sister stations: XHERJ-FM

History
- First air date: March 26, 1945; 1994 (FM)
- Former call signs: XETK-AM, XHTK-FM, XEOPE-AM
- Former frequencies: 630 AM
- Call sign meaning: Óscar Pérez Escobosa

Technical information
- Licensing authority: CRT
- Class: B1
- ERP: 15 kW
- HAAT: −8.8 m (−29 ft)

Links
- Website: exafm.com/mazatlan/

XHOPE-FM 89.7 is a radio station in Mazatlán, Sinaloa, Mexico. It carries the national Exa FM format from MVS Radio.

== History ==
XEOPE received its first concession in March 1945. Then known as XETK-AM, it broadcast on 630 kHz with 1,000 watts day and 250 watts night (later increased to 500).

In 1972, Oscar Pérez Escobosa bought XETK along with XESA-AM in Culiacán. He already owned XERJ-AM in Mazatlán, which had begun operations in 1940, and he also founded XHMZ-TV channel 7. Pérez founded Grupo Promomedios, which continues to own the rechristened XEOPE/XHOPE (named in his honor) as well as the FM successors to those stations.
