= XHQT-FM =

As a result of the AM-FM migration in Mexico, two radio stations currently bear the XHQT-FM callsign:

- XHQT-FM (Sonora), 102.7 FM "Exa FM" in Nogales, Sonora
- XHQT-FM (Veracruz), 106.9 FM "La Poderosa" in Veracruz, Veracruz
