= XHLC-FM (Guadalajara) =

Radio station in Guadalajara, Jalisco, Mexico

- Guadalajara, Jalisco; Mexico
- Frequency: 98.7 MHz
- Branding: Globo

Programming
- Format: Romantic

Ownership
- Owner: MVS Radio; (Stereorey México, S.A.)
- Sister stations: XHRO-FM, XHMA-FM

History
- First air date: 1969
- Call sign meaning: Luis López Camacho, original concessionaire

Technical information
- Licensing authority: CRT
- Class: C1
- ERP: 100,000 watts
- HAAT: 58.3 meters (191 ft)
- Transmitter coordinates: 20°40′53.37″N 103°25′28.18″W

Links
- Webcast: Listen live
- Website: fmglobo.com

XHLC-FM is a radio station in Guadalajara, Jalisco, Mexico. Broadcasting on 98.7 FM, XHLC is owned by MVS Radio and carries its Globo romantic format.

== History ==
The concession for the station was issued to Luis López Camacho in 1969; the López Camacho family would retain the station under the name Metropolitana de Frecuencia Modulada, S.A. de C.V., through 2018. The station was a contemporary hit radio station known as Stereo 99 for much of its history, before adopting the Radio Absoluta name in the early 2010s.

In 2015, XHLC received authorization to begin HD Radio transmissions, though the station has not used this authorization.

On June 23, 2018, XHLC's format came to an abrupt end, and the station began carrying an automated format of primarily Spanish romantic music. On Monday, June 25, TuneIn was updated with the new FM Globo branding, marking the return of the heritage MVS Radio brand, which had previously been heard in the market from 1978 to 2003 on XHSC-FM 93.9. The Federal Telecommunications Institute approved the transfer of the concession from Metropolitana de Frecuencia Modulada to Stereorey Mexico, S.A., on December 12, 2018.
