= Joaquín Vargas Gómez =

Mexican businessman

Joaquín Vargas Gómez (28 September 1925 – 28 November 2009) was a Mexican media mogul and owner of MVS Comunicaciones, a conglomerate that owns a radio station group known as MVS Radio, with stations in Mexico and in many Latin American countries, as well as some in the United States. He also founded Corporación Mexicana de Restaurantes (CMR), an owner and operator of various restaurants.

== Early life and education ==
Vargas Gómez was born in Mexico City, but considered himself an adopted child of Linares, Nuevo León. In Mexico City, he attended Secondary School No. 3 and the Heroico Colegio Militar, where he graduated with the rank of sublieutenant. He went to the military school because he did not have the means to attend a private university. He also took courses in business administration from the Instituto Panamericano de Alta Dirección de Empresas (IPADE).

== Career ==
Vargas was an entrepreneur who created dozens of businesses in a variety of fields, including tool factories and gas stations in the Mexico City area. In 1965, on a visit to the United States, Vargas was impressed by the quality of the stereo sound in his car. On April 15, 1967, listeners in Monterrey were treated to the launch of Mexico's first stereo FM station, Stereorey, named for its stereo audio and for the city where it first launched. Stereorey would later become a national network, as Vargas acquired concessions for additional FM radio stations at a time when the band was mostly ignored and most cars sold in the country only had AM radios. By the 2000s, MVS Radio, the group built from those initial stations, operated four formats and two national networks. Another audio business that sprang from Vargas was Programusic, a Muzak-like service offering CD-quality audio for businesses and convention centers. Shortly after he founded Stereorey, he became the president and director general of another innovative broadcaster based in Monterrey, Televisión Independiente de México (TIM). After leaving TIM, he returned to television in 1976 by founding Telerey, the first production and postproduction center in Mexico.

In the late 1980s and early 1990s, MVS expanded to television, initially using the Telerey name. MVS established the first MMDS broadcast system in Mexico, known as MVS Multivisión and later rebranded MásTV. Multivisión was considered the only true challenger to Cablevisión in the 1990s.

Vargas also founded the Corporación Mexicana de Restaurantes (Mexican Restaurant Corporation or CMR), a company that today owns 132 restaurants including concepts such as Los Almendros and Restaurante del Lago, as well as franchises of Chili's, Olive Garden and Red Lobster. The first location of the concept that launched CMR, Wings, was established in a retired North Star DC-4 parked near the Mexico City International Airport.

Through his life, Vargas served in a variety of industry capacities, including a term as president of the National Chamber of the Radio and Television Industry (CIRT), the national association of broadcasters, as well as seats on the boards of CONCANACO, Banamex, the Universidad Anáhuac and El Universal newspaper.

== Retirement and death ==
In 1996, Vargas retired from MVS and CMR, leaving the businesses in the hands of his children. He died on 28 November 2009 of natural causes, after having suffered from Parkinson's disease since the 1990s; President Felipe Calderón issued an official statement lamenting the loss of "a businessman who contributed to the development of the radio industry in Mexico".
