= XHEXA-FM =

Contemporary hit radio station in Mexico City

- Mexico City; Mexico
- Frequency: 104.9 MHz
- Branding: Exa FM

Programming
- Format: Contemporary hit radio

Ownership
- Owner: MVS Radio; (Stereorey México, S.A.)
- Sister stations: XHMVS-FM; XERC-FM

History
- First air date: January 19, 1972
- Former call signs: XHVIP-FM (prior to sign-on), XHBST-FM, XHMRD-FM

Technical information
- Licensing authority: CRT
- Class: C
- ERP: 89,400 watts
- HAAT: 468.13 meters (1,535.9 ft)
- Transmitter coordinates: 19°31′56.7″N 99°07′51.7″W

Links
- Webcast: Listen live; Listen live (via iHeartRadio)
- Website: exafm.com

XHEXA-FM (104.9 FM) is a Contemporary hit radio station in Mexico City. XHEXA-FM is owned by MVS Radio and is the flagship station of the Exa FM format. The transmitter site is located atop Cerro del Chiquihuite.

== History ==
XHBST-FM signed on the air in 1974, owned by the same Stereorey consortium that brought FM to major Mexican cities on stations such as XHV-FM 102.5 Mexico City and XHSRO-FM in Monterrey. It carried the "Stereo Best" format, which was very similar. Not long after, it changed formats completely to "FM Globo", a name it would use with varying formats including romantic music, Spanish pop and contemporary music. The station changed its callsign to XHMRD-FM on October 8, 1991, and on January 1, 2000, changed its name to "Exa FM", with a Top 40 CHR format, its name alluding to the format of airing blocks of six consecutive songs. Its callsign was later changed to XHEXA-FM to reflect its new name. The callsign had been in use for a brief time on an MVS Radio station in Hermosillo, Sonora, which returned to the XHBH-FM callsign when the XHEXA calls moved to Mexico City.
