= Xev =

Xev, XEV or xev can refer to:

- XEV, vehicle manufacturer
- Xev Bellringer, previously Zev Bellringer, A fictional character from a sci-fi TV series Lexx
- Stockholm Central Station (IATA airport code XEV)
- XEV-AM, a radio station in Chihuahua that is now on FM as XHV-FM
