= XHUH-FM =

Radio station in Tuxtepec, Oaxaca

- Tuxtepec, Oaxaca; Mexico
- Frequency: 96.9 FM
- Branding: Universal FM 96.9

Programming
- Format: contemporary music in English & Spanish adult hits
- Affiliations: Radio Fórmula

Ownership
- Owner: ORP; (Teresa de Jesús Bravo Sobron)
- Sister stations: XHXP-FM

History
- First air date: April 24, 1965 (concession)

Technical information
- ERP: 25 kW
- Transmitter coordinates: 18°04′56″N 96°09′08″W

Links
- Webcast: Listen live
- Website: universalfm969.com

XHUH-FM is a radio station on 96.9 FM in Tuxtepec, Oaxaca. It is owned by ORP and carries the Universal FM 96.9.

== History ==
XEUH-AM received its concession on April 24, 1965. It was owned by Juan B. Peimbert Jiménez Castro and broadcast with 1,000 watts on 1320 kHz. It was sold to its current concessionaire in 1993 and increased its power to 5,000 watts day in the 1990s.

XEUH received approval to migrate to FM in 2010. On FM, it first was an Exa FM affiliate, then changed to Exa FM's pop competitor Los 40 before returning to an MVS format with FM Globo in September 2018.
