= XHNR-FM =

Radio station in Oaxaca City, Oaxaca, Mexico

Oaxaca City, Oaxaca; Mexico
- Broadcast area: Oaxaca, Oaxaca & the Central Valley
- Frequency: 98.5 FM
- Branding: Exa FM

Programming
- Format: Spanish & English Top 40 (CHR)
- Affiliations: MVS Radio

Ownership
- Owner: Organización Radiofónica de Oaxaca, S.A de C.V.; (Organización XHNR, S.A. de C.V.)

History
- First air date: November 23, 1977 (concession)

Technical information
- Class: B1
- ERP: 25,000 watts
- HAAT: -134.8 meters
- Transmitter coordinates: 17°4′20.2″N 96°43′36.4″W

Links
- Webcast: Listen live
- Website: exafm.com

XHNR-FM is a e radio station in Oaxaca City, Mexico. It is owned by Organización Radiofónica de Oaxaca, S.A de C.V., and airs the Exa FM contemporary hit radio format under partnership with MVS Radio.

== History ==
XHNR received its concession on November 23, 1977. It was owned by Miguel Zarate Aquino until 1986, when Márquez Rodríguez bought it.
