= XHCOC-FM =

Radio station in Colima, Colima, Mexico

- Colima, Colima; Mexico
- Frequency: 99.7 MHz
- Branding: Exa FM

Programming
- Format: Pop
- Affiliations: MVS Radio

Ownership
- Owner: JA Radio; (Ja Radio, S. de R.L. de C.V.)
- Sister stations: XHUU-FM

History
- First air date: October 11, 1993 (concession)
- Call sign meaning: Colima, Colima

Technical information
- ERP: 25 kW
- Transmitter coordinates: 19°14′58″N 103°42′28″W

Links
- Webcast: Listen live
- Website: exafm.com

XHCOC-FM is a radio station on 99.7 FM in Colima, Colima, Mexico. The station is owned by JA Radio; it is instead a franchise of the Exa FM pop music format from MVS Radio.

== History ==
XHCOC began as XECOC-AM 1430, with a concession awarded to Radio Creatividad, S.A., on October 11, 1993. It was sold to Grupo ACIR in 1998 and migrated to FM in 2011.

Grupo ACIR ceased operating XHCOC-FM in March 2023, with the new operators taking on the Exa FM pop format.
