= XHPS-FM =

Radio station in Veracruz, Veracruz, Mexico

- Veracruz, Veracruz; Mexico
- Frequency: 93.3 MHz
- Branding: Exa FM

Programming
- Format: Contemporary hit radio

Ownership
- Owner: MVS Radio; (Stereorey México, S.A.)
- Sister stations: XHVE-FM

History
- First air date: November 9, 1977 (concession)

Technical information
- Licensing authority: CRT
- Class: B
- ERP: 30.937 kW
- HAAT: 68.60 m

Links
- Webcast: Listen live
- Website: exafm.com

XHPS-FM is a radio station on 93.3 FM in Veracruz, Veracruz, Mexico. It is owned by MVS Radio and carries its Exa FM pop format.

== History ==
XHPS received its concession on November 9, 1977. It was owned by Alberto Pérez Alfaro. In 1986, an MVS concessionaire bought the station. Under MVS, it originally carried the company's FM Globo romantic format before becoming pop as Pulsar FM in March 1999 and then Exa FM in January 2000.
