= XHADA-FM =

Radio station in Ensenada, Baja California, Mexico

- Ensenada, Baja California; Mexico
- Frequency: 104.1 MHz
- Branding: Exa FM

Programming
- Format: Spanish & English Top 40 (CHR)

Ownership
- Owner: MVS Radio; (Stereorey México, S.A.)
- Sister stations: XHENA-FM

History
- First air date: 1991
- Former frequencies: 106.9 MHz (1991–2018)
- Call sign meaning: Last three letters of Ensenada

Technical information
- Licensing authority: CRT
- Class: B
- ERP: 6,000 watts
- HAAT: 152.05 m (498.9 ft)

Links
- Webcast: Listen live
- Website: exafm.com

XHADA-FM is a radio station on 104.1 FM in Ensenada, Baja California, Mexico. It is owned by MVS Radio and carries its Exa FM format.

== History ==
XHADA came on the air in 1991 on 106.9 MHz. Like many of MVS's Baja California stations, it was originally owned by Carlos Armando Madrazo Pintado's Sociedad Mexicana de Radio de Baja California. MVS quickly bought SOMER Baja California and later dissolved the concessionaire. It originally broadcast as Estéreo Amistad, broadcasting pop music in Spanish, later rebranding as Sí FM. The station adopted the Stereorey classic hits brand in 1999 and Best FM in September 2002, before converting to Exa FM in August 2003.

As part of its 2017 concession renewal, on August 27, 2018, XHADA-FM moved to 104.1 MHz, in order to clear 106-108 MHz as much as possible for community and indigenous radio stations.
