= XHENA-FM =

- Ensenada, Baja California; Mexico
- Broadcast area: Ensenada, Baja California
- Frequency: 103.3 (MHz)
- Branding: La Mejor

Programming
- Format: Regional Mexican

Ownership
- Owner: MVS Radio; (Stereorey México, S.A.)
- Sister stations: XHADA-FM

History
- First air date: 1994
- Call sign meaning: ENsenadA

Technical information
- Licensing authority: CRT
- Class: B
- ERP: 8,800 watts
- HAAT: 156.9 m (515 ft)

Links
- Webcast: Flash Player, PLS
- Website: lamejor.com.mx/ensenada

XHENA-FM is a Mexican radio station in Ensenada, Baja California. It is owned by MVS Radio and carries its regional Mexican La Mejor format.

== History ==
XHENA came on the air in 1994, creating a duopoly with XHADA, which had signed on three years earlier. Like many of MVS's Baja California stations, it was originally owned by Carlos Armando Madrazo Pintado's Sociedad Mexicana de Radio de Baja California (being transferred to the company itself in 1999). MVS quickly bought SOMER Baja California and later dissolved the concessionaire.
