= XHAGT-FM =

Radio station in Aguascalientes, Aguascalientes, Mexico

- Aguascalientes, Aguascalientes; Mexico
- Frequency: 93.7 MHz
- Branding: La Mejor FM

Programming
- Format: Regional Mexican
- Affiliations: MVS Radio

Ownership
- Owner: Radio Universal; (Irma Graciela Peña Torres)
- Sister stations: XHPLA-FM, XHAGC-FM, XHCAA-FM XHAC-FM

History
- First air date: October 30, 1992 (concession)
- Call sign meaning: "Aguascalientes"

Technical information
- Licensing authority: CRT
- Class: C1
- ERP: 56,700 watts
- HAAT: 78.5 meters (258 ft)

Links
- Webcast: Listen live
- Website: radiouniversal.mx

XHAGT-FM is a radio station on 93.7 FM in Aguascalientes, Aguascalientes, Mexico. It carries the La Mejor FM by MVS Radio is owned by Radio Universal.

== History ==
XHAGT-FM started as a Top 40 station called Estéreo 93 before becoming classic rock-formatted Classics 93. In 1996, Radio Universal and MVS Radio partnered, which resulted in 93.7 FM picking up MVS's Stereorey network. It also began to air the morning news program Para Empezar hosted by Pedro Ferriz de Con. On September 2, 2002, as part of a national strategy, Stereorey changed its name to Best FM and later, on November 1, 2005, 93.7 FM again changed its name and format, taking the La Mejor national format from MVS.
