= XHAC-FM (Aguascalientes) =

Radio station in Aguascalientes, Aguascalientes, Mexico

Radio Fórmula 106.9 FM XHAC-FM
- Aguascalientes, Aguascalientes; Mexico
- Frequency: 106.9 MHz
- Branding: Radio Fórmula 106.9 FM

Programming
- Format: News / Talk
- Affiliations: Grupo Fórmula

Ownership
- Owner: Radio Universal; (Manuel Guadalupe, J. Jesús, María Cristina, María Teresa, José Abraham and Alfonso Ramírez de la Torre)
- Sister stations: XHAGT-FM, XHAGC-FM, XHPLA-FM, XHCAA-FM

History
- First air date: September 14, 1966 (concession)
- Former call signs: XEAC-AM
- Former frequencies: 1400 kHz
- Call sign meaning: "Aguascalientes"

Technical information
- Licensing authority: CRT
- Class: B1
- ERP: 25,000 watts
- HAAT: 49.5 meters (162 ft)
- Transmitter coordinates: 21°55′11.05″N 102°15′57.49″W

Links
- Website: Radio Formula

XHAC-FM is a radio station on 106.9 FM in Aguascalientes, Aguascalientes, Mexico. It is owned by Radio Universal and carries a news format known as Radio Fórmula 106.9 FM.

== History ==
XHAC signed on in 1966 as XEAC-AM on 1400 kHz. It was owned by Jesús Ramírez Gamez until 1994 and was known as "La Grande 1400" until 1999.

XEAC migrated to FM in 2012. Until August 2015, this station carried the Ke Buena format from Televisa Radio. At that time, it switched to adult contemporary as Azul 106.9.

At the end of 2019, XHAC joined Radio Formula.
