= Cerro del Chiquihuite =

Hill in Mexico City

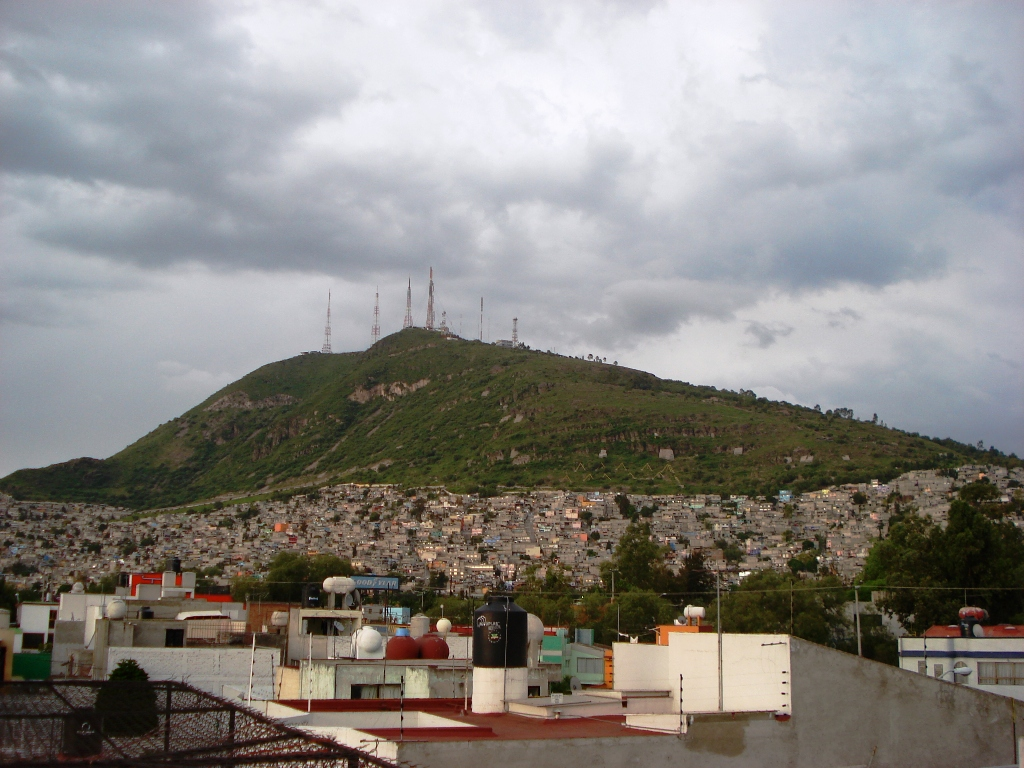
- Cerro del Chiquihuite in 2007

Highest point
- Elevation: 2,730 m (8,960 ft)
- Coordinates: 19°31′58″N 99°07′50″W

Naming
- English translation: Chiquihuite Hill
- Language of name: Spanish and Nahuatl

Geography
- Location: Mexico City; State of Mexico

Cerro del Chiquihuite (Chiquihuite Hill) is a hill located in the north of Mexico City, in the borough of Gustavo A. Madero and bordering the municipality of Tlalnepantla de Baz in the State of Mexico. The hill has a height of 2,730 metres (8,960 ft) above sea level and forms part of the Sierra de Guadalupe mountain range.

It was used as a filming location for the 1993 Mexican film Lolo.

In 2021, a landslide occurred in the Lázaro Cárdenas neighborhood located in Tlalnepantla de Baz, State of Mexico.

== Geology ==
The Cerro del Chiquihuite is a volcanic exogenic dome made of andesitic rock deposited in layers of varying thickness that show signs of extreme weathering. In the past, Chiquihuite had springs of water scattered over its surface, but with the passing of years, these springs have diminished in size.

Historically the mountain has housed several springs, but most of these have dried up. For instance, in the borough of Lázaro Cárdenas, only the largest of these, known as "El Pocito", still flows.

The mountain is rather heavily developed and is prone to landslides; in 1987, 15 people were killed by mudslides off Cerro del Chiquihuite and La Presa hills after heavy rains hit Mexico City.

== History ==
=== 15th century : The Templo Mayor ===
During the 15th century, the Cerro del Chiquihuite was located on the shores of Lake Texcoco, some 9 to 12 kilometers from the heart of the Aztec Empire, Tenochtitlán. The Cerro del Chiquihuite was made principally of a pinkish and violet rock called andesita de lamprobolita, an extrusive igneous rock. One of the principle merits of this rock is the pseudo stratification of its deposited layers of varying thickness. This characteristic allows for flat cuts of stone to be obtained with ease to be used for the tiling of the floor, corners and overhead masonry. Among the towns located in the basin of Mexico, this type of rock was known as Tenayocátetl (Piedra de Tenayuca), and was used in the construction of the Templo Mayor.

=== The chiquihuitazo ===
On December 27, 2002, armed guards hired by Televisión Azteca stormed and took over the transmitter facilities of XHTVM-TV channel 40, which are located on the mountain. The takeover, which stemmed from a contractual and legal dispute over a 1998 contract between XHTVM's owners and Azteca, led to a series of events, negotiations and public debate known as the chiquihuitazo, after the mountain, that resulted in XHTVM's owners rebuffing Azteca's forceful attempt to retake the station.

The chiquihuitazo resulted in a song, "No Te Metas con mi Chiquihuite" (Don't Mess with My Chiquihuite), produced by a program that aired on Canal 40 at the time.

== Broadcasting ==
A road leads to the top of the mountain, where transmitters are located for five FM radio stations and eleven television stations, as well as other telecommunications equipment.

=== Television stations ===
- XHDF-TDT, channel 1 virtual/25 digital
- XHTDMX-TDT, channel 6 virtual/11 digital
- XHIMT-TDT, channel 7 virtual/24 digital
- XEIPN-TDT, channel 11 virtual/33 digital
- XHCDM-TDT, channel 21 digital
- XEIMT-TDT, channel 22 virtual/23 digital
- XHTRES-TDT, channel 28 virtual/27 digital
- XHSPR-TDT, channel 30 digital
- XHTVM-TDT, channel 40 virtual/26 digital
- XHHCU-TDT, channel 45 virtual/18 digital

=== Radio stations ===
- XEDA-FM 90.5 MHz
- XHDL-FM 98.5 MHz
- XHMM-FM 100.1 MHz
- XHMVS-FM 102.5 MHz
- XHEXA-FM 104.9 MHz

Five stations owned by Grupo Radio Centro maintain backup facilities on Cerro del Chiquihuite. They were relocated to a new facility at Villa Alpina, Naucalpan, State of Mexico, in August 2012.

== Transportation ==
Cablebús Tlalpexco services the area.

== 2021 landslide ==
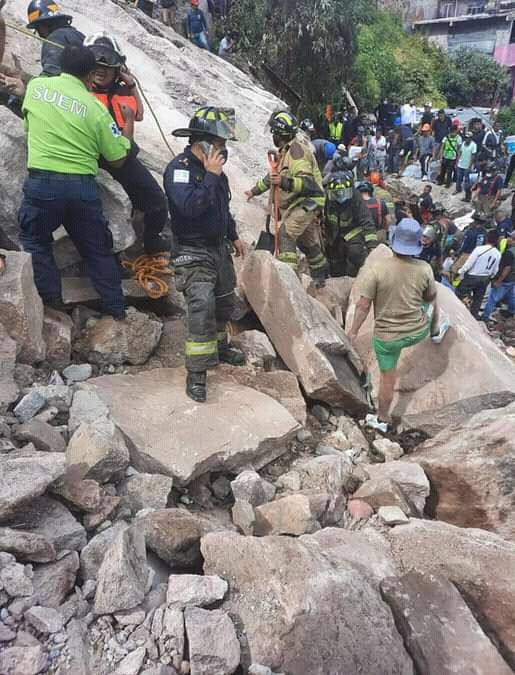
Firefighters and rescue teams after the landslide

On 10 September 2021, a landslide occurred in the Lázaro Cárdenas neighborhood located in Tlalnepantla, State of Mexico. At least 10 houses were buried in the collapse. A total of 10 people; 6 adults and four minors were reported as missing, as well as one deceased person. The municipal president of Tlalnepantla, Raciel Pérez Cruz, asked the inhabitants of the area to evacuate the entire street where the disaster occurred, this in order to guarantee their safety against possible risks due to other landslides that could occur. Shelters were made for those affected after the evacuation. One person was rescued alive but with injuries, who was identified as 28-year-old Jessica and sister of the person who was found dead named Mariana Martínez Rodríguez, a young 21-year-old student. On 11 September, the Undersecretary of the Government of the State of Mexico, Ricardo de la Cruz Musalem, clarified that there were only three people missing after the collapse identified as Paola Daniela Campos, 22, mother of 5-year-old Jorge Dilan Mendoza Campos and 3-year-old Mia Mayrín. Mia's body was found in the rubble by rescue teams on 14 September and she was buried in the municipal cemetery of Lázaro Cárdenas on the 16th, with her mother and brother still missing. On the same day, the rescued survivor was discharged, who was hospitalized for six days at the Maximiliano Ruiz Castañeda General Hospital. On 21 September, the bodies of Paola and Dilan were found and both were buried on the 23rd in the same cemetery as Mia.
