= XHVZ-FM =

Radio station in Cuernavaca, Morelos, Mexico

Cuernavaca, Morelos; Mexico
- Frequency: 97.3 MHz
- Branding: La Mejor

Programming
- Format: Regional Mexican

Ownership
- Owner: MVS Radio; (Stereorey México, S.A.)
- Sister stations: XHCT-FM

History
- First air date: March 28, 1980 (concession)
- Call sign meaning: Original station applicants, Augusto Pérez Villanueva and Enrique Rivas Zivy

Technical information
- Class: B
- ERP: 31.17 kW

Links
- Webcast: Listen live
- Website: lamejor.com.mx

XHVZ-FM is a radio station on 97.3 FM in Cuernavaca, Morelos, Mexico. It is owned by MVS Radio and carries the La Mejor Regional Mexican format.

== History ==
XHVZ received its concession on March 28, 1980, but it had been initially filed for on August 8, 1967, by Augusto Pérez Villanueva and Enrique Rivas Zivy. Initially owned by Guadalupe Torres Vda. de Pérez Villanueva, it was bought by MVS in April 1986. Long a Stereorey station, it transitioned to Best FM along with almost all Stereorey stations in 2002 and then shifted to La Mejor upon its launch in 2005.
