= XHSR-FM =

Radio station in Monterrey, Nuevo León, Mexico

- Monterrey, Nuevo León; Mexico
- Frequency: 97.3 MHz
- Branding: Exa FM

Programming
- Format: Spanish & English Top 40 (CHR)

Ownership
- Owner: MVS Radio; (Stereorey México, S.A.)
- Sister stations: XHJM-FM, XHSRO-FM

History
- First air date: November 12, 1976
- Call sign meaning: Sistema Radio Recuerdo, S.A. (original concessionaire)

Technical information
- Licensing authority: CRT
- Class: C1
- ERP: 95.445 kW
- HAAT: 215.4 meters (707 ft)
- Transmitter coordinates: 25°37′31.7″N 100°19′00.9″W

Links
- Website: exafm.com/monterrey

XHSR-FM is a station in Monterrey, Nuevo León, Mexico. It broadcasts on 97.3 FM and carries the Exa FM Contemporary Hit Radio format from MVS Radio. The transmitter is located atop Cerro del Mirador.

== History ==
XHSR received its concession late in 1976 and was owned by the concessionaire Sistema Radio Recuerdo, S.A., managed by José Vargas Santamarina. Santamarina would go on to become a director of some of MVS's radio stations. As an MVS station, it acquired the FM Globo format, which remained until 1998, when it became Pulsar FM, changing again to Exa FM in 2000.
