= XHWJ-FM =

Radio station in Tehuacán, Puebla

Tehuacán, Puebla; Mexico
- Frequency: 102.9 FM
- Branding: Exa FM

Programming
- Format: Pop
- Affiliations: MVS Radio

Ownership
- Owner: Radio TH Comunicación; (XEWJ Radio Popular, S.A. de C.V.)
- Sister stations: XHGY-FM

History
- First air date: March 31, 1944 (concession)

Technical information
- ERP: 25 kW
- Transmitter coordinates: 18°27′24.6″N 97°25′20.4″W

Links
- Website: www.exafm.com#!/tehuacan/home

XHWJ-FM is a radio station on 102.9 FM in Tehuacán, Puebla. It carries the Exa FM pop format from MVS Radio.

== History ==
XEWJ-AM 1420 received its concession on March 31, 1944. It was owned by Mariano Caraza Domínguez and broadcast with 100 watts. In 1950, it was sold to Jaime Retif del Moral, and the following year, José Antonio Abascal Septien acquired XEWJ. It was sold to a concessionaire in 1964. By 1969, XEWJ was broadcasting with 1,000 watts day and 250 night. The concessionaire is currently owned by the Sánchez Tinoco family; it has had several different studios and owners over the years.

XEWJ was cleared to move to FM in 2011.
