= XHMA-FM =

Radio station in Zapopan/Guadalajara, Jalisco, Mexico

- Zapopan, Jalisco; Mexico
- Broadcast area: Guadalajara
- Frequency: 101.1 MHz
- Branding: Exa FM

Programming
- Format: Contemporary hit radio

Ownership
- Owner: MVS Radio; (Stereorey México, S.A.)
- Sister stations: XHRO-FM, XHLC-FM

History
- First air date: November 10, 1969 (concession)
- Call sign meaning: Original concessionaire Manuel Ayala Estrada

Technical information
- Licensing authority: CRT
- Class: C1
- ERP: 96.73 kW
- HAAT: 71.19 meters (233.6 ft)
- Transmitter coordinates: 20°40′53.37″N 103°25′28.18″W

Links
- Webcast: Listen live
- Website: exafm.com

XHMA-FM is a radio station on 101.1 FM in Guadalajara, Jalisco, Mexico. The station is owned by MVS Radio and carries the Exa FM national format.

== History ==
XHMA received its first concession on November 10, 1969. It was owned by Manuel Ayala Estrada until 1975, when the concession was transferred to XHMA-FM Estereo Latino, S.A., the owner of Núcleo Radio Guadalajara. The station was known as Stereo Cien until 1995, when it adopted a pop format as Pulsar FM, which continued until the launch of Exa FM in 2000.
