= XHMRA-FM =

Radio station in Mérida, Yucatán

- Mérida, Yucatán; Mexico
- Frequency: 99.3 MHz
- Branding: Exa FM

Programming
- Format: Contemporary hit radio

Ownership
- Owner: MVS Radio; (Stereorey México, S.A.)
- Sister stations: XHQW-FM

History
- First air date: August 25, 1992 (concession)
- Call sign meaning: "Mérida"

Technical information
- Class: C1
- ERP: 91.488 kW
- Transmitter coordinates: 21°00′55.1″N 89°39′49″W

Links
- Webcast: Listen live
- Website: exafm.com

XHMRA-FM is a radio station in Mérida, Yucatán, Mexico. Broadcasting on 99.3 FM, XHMRA is owned by MVS Radio and carries its Exa FM national format.

== History ==
The station's concession was awarded in 1992 to Luis Aviña Ayala. In 2000, MVS Radio bought the station. It is one of very few MVS Radio stations not under the concessionaire of Stereorey México, S.A.

In 2015, the station lowered its effective radiated power from 98 to 91 kW.
