= XHVJS-FM =

Radio station in Villa Juárez, Sonora

- Ciudad Obregón, Sonora; Mexico
- Frequency: 103.3 MHz
- Branding: La Mejor FM

Programming
- Format: Grupera
- Affiliations: MVS Radio

Ownership
- Owner: Radio Grupo García de León; (Luis Felipe García de León Martínez)
- Sister stations: XHOX-FM

History
- First air date: August 16, 1994 (concession)
- Call sign meaning: Villa Juárez Sonora

Technical information
- Class: B
- ERP: 41.25 kW

Links
- Website: lamejor.com.mx/cdobregon

XHVJS-FM is a radio station on 103.3 FM in Ciudad Obregón, Sonora, Mexico. It is owned by Radio Grupo García de León and carries the La Mejor FM grupera format from MVS Radio.

== History ==
XHVJS received its concession on August 16, 1994.
