= XHAG-FM =

Radio station in Córdoba, Veracruz

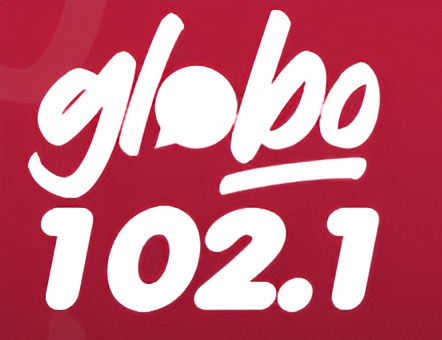
- Córdoba, Veracruz; Mexico
- Frequency: 102.1 FM
- Branding: Globo 102.1

Programming
- Format: Spanish and english adult contemporary format
- Affiliations: MVS Radio

Ownership
- Owner: Radio Comunicaciones de las Altas Montañas; (XEAG, S.A.)
- Sister stations: XHPT-FM, XHPG-FM

History
- First air date: July 1, 1935 (concession)
- Former call signs: XEAG-AM
- Former frequencies: 1310 AM, 1280 AM

Technical information
- Class: B1
- ERP: 15 kW
- Transmitter coordinates: 18°52′9″N 97°13′9″W

Links
- Webcast: Listen live
- Website: FM Globo official website

XHAG-FM is a radio station on 102.1 FM in Córdoba, Veracruz, Mexico. It is owned by Radio Comunicaciones de las Altas Montañas carries the Globo spanish and english adult contemporary format from MVS Radio

== History ==
XEAG-AM received its concession on July 1, 1935, owned by Diodoro Zuñiga and operating on 1310 kHz. In 1948, it was sold to Luz María Zuñiga de San Miguel. By the 1960s, it was on 1280 kHz with 1,000 watts, later increased to 2,000 watts day.

XEAG moved to FM in 2010, initially as La Mejor until 2015. In 2017, it flipped from Ke Buena to Stereo Joya, becoming GRD's second station with that name and format. Two years later, it transitioned to the FM Globo brand from MVS Radio as part of a change in operator. The station switched from FM Globo to the Vox FM brand from Radiópolis on August 19, 2023.

In the first week of November 2024, they decide to abandon the VOX brand of Radiópolis, after 1 year and two months with the format and on November 20, 2024, the Globo brand of MVS Radio returns. The same month, the Federal Telecommunications Institute (IFT) authorized the transfer of the XHPG-FM concession to the Libreros Trejo family, owner of Radio Comunicaciones de Altas Montañas.
