= XHCAA-FM =

Radio station in Aguascalientes City, Aguascalientes, Mexico

- Aguascalientes, Aguascalientes; Mexico
- Frequency: 100.9 MHz
- Branding: Stereorey

Programming
- Format: Oldies
- Affiliations: MVS Radio

Ownership
- Owner: Radio Universal; (Radio Calvillo, S.A. de C.V.)
- Sister stations: XHAGT-FM, XHAGC-FM, XHPLA-FM, XHAC-FM

History
- First air date: November 22, 1978 (concession)
- Call sign meaning: "Calvillo, Aguascalientes"

Technical information
- Licensing authority: CRT
- Class: B1
- ERP: 25 kW
- HAAT: 45.75 meters (150.1 ft)
- Transmitter coordinates: 21°55′11.05″N 102°15′57.49″W

Links
- Webcast: Listen live
- Website: radiouniversal.mx

XHCAA-FM is a radio station in Aguascalientes, Aguascalientes, Mexico. Broadcasting on 100.9 FM, XHCAA is owned by Radio Universal and carries the Stereorey format from MVS Radio.

== History ==
XECAA-AM 950 received its concession on November 12, 1978. The station was originally located in El Puertecito and known as La Doble AA; in 2002, it moved its transmitter to the current site.

The station went through various formats, including Azul 95 (a format later revived on XHAC-FM) and Life FM. Ultimately, Radio Universal would work with MVS Radio, whose formats it carries in Aguascalientes, as part of a limited relaunch of Stereorey in several cities in the Bajío in 2014.
