= XHVW-FM =

Radio station in Acámbaro, Guanajuato, Mexico

- Acámbaro, Guanajuato; Mexico
- Frequency: 90.5 FM
- Branding: Exa FM

Programming
- Format: Spanish & English Top 40 (CHR)
- Affiliations: MVS Radio

Ownership
- Owner: Organización Radiofónica de Acámbaro, S.A. de C.V.
- Sister stations: XHAK-FM

History
- First air date: March 8, 1961 (concession)
- Former call signs: XEVW-AM
- Former frequencies: 1160 kHz

Technical information
- Class: AA
- ERP: 6 kW
- Transmitter coordinates: 20°02′19.6″N 100°45′42.5″W

Links
- Webcast: Listen live
- Website: exafm.com

XHVW-FM is a radio station on 90.5 FM in Acámbaro, Guanajuato, Mexico. XHVW is owned by Organización Radiofónica de Acámbaro and carries the Exa FM pop format from MVS Radio.

== History ==
XHVW began as XEVW-AM 1160, which received its concession on March 8, 1961. It was owned by J. Jesús García Morales. In 1985, García Morales sold to Radio Acámbaro, S.A., which then became ORA in 2000.

After steady power increases over the years, XEVW migrated to FM in 2011 on 90.5 MHz. In 2016, XHVW flipped to Exa FM.
