= XHPG-FM =

Radio station in Córdoba, Veracruz

- Córdoba, Veracruz; Mexico
- Frequency: 92.1 FM
- Branding: La Mejor

Programming
- Format: Regional Mexican
- Affiliations: MVS Radio

Ownership
- Owner: Radio Comunicaciones de las Altas Montañas; (FMXHPG, S.A. de C.V.)
- Sister stations: XHPT-FM, XHAG-FM

History
- First air date: August 26, 1982 (concession)

Technical information
- ERP: 10 kW

Links
- Website: www.lamejor.com.mx/plaza/cordoba/

XHPG-FM is a radio station on 92.1 FM in Córdoba, Veracruz. It is owned by Radio Comunicaciones de las Altas Montañas and carries the La Mejor Regional Mexican format brand from MVS Radio.

== History ==
XHPG received its concession on August 26, 1982. It was originally owned by Carmen Fariña González.

In November 2019, operation of the station was transferred to Radio Comunicaciones de las Altas Montañas after having been locally run by Atomium Media; the new operators instituted the La Mejor Regional Mexican format from MVS Radio on February 10, 2020. The concession remained owned by the Ferráez family, whose Avanradio operates elsewhere in the state of Veracruz. In November 2024, the Federal Telecommunications Institute (IFT) authorized the transfer of the XHPG-FM concession to the Libreros Trejo family, owner of Radio Comunicaciones de Altas Montañas, as FMXHPG, S.A. de C.V.
