= XHCT-FM =

Radio station in Cuernavaca, Morelos, Mexico

- Cuernavaca, Morelos; Mexico
- Frequency: 95.7 MHz
- Branding: Exa FM

Programming
- Format: Pop

Ownership
- Owner: MVS Radio; (Stereorey México, S.A.)
- Sister stations: XHVZ-FM

History
- First air date: November 25, 1971 (concession)
- Call sign meaning: Last name of original concessionaire Pedro Antonio Calleja Tuero

Technical information
- Class: B
- ERP: 31.19 kW

Links
- Webcast: Exa FM webcast
- Website: exafm.com/cuernavaca

XHCT-FM is a radio station on 95.7 FM in Cuernavaca, Morelos, Mexico. It carries the Exa FM pop format of its owner, MVS Radio.

== History ==
XHCT received its concession on November 25, 1971. The station was owned by Pedro Antonio Calleja Tuero. In 1983, MVS bought the station under the concessionaire Frecuencia Modulada de Cuernavaca, S.A; this and other MVS concessionaires were later consolidated into Stereorey México. Under MVS, the station flipped to the FM Globo romantic format, which was replaced nationally by Exa FM in 2000.
