= XHNGS-FM =

- Nogales, Sonora; Mexico
- Frequency: 96.7 MHz
- Branding: La Mejor

Programming
- Format: Grupera

Ownership
- Owner: MVS Radio; (Stereorey México, S.A.)
- Sister stations: XHQT-FM

History
- First air date: May 31, 1991
- Call sign meaning: Nogales

Technical information
- Licensing authority: CRT
- Class: B
- ERP: 30,380 watts
- HAAT: 19.2 meters (63 ft)

Links
- Webcast: tunein.com/radio/La-Mejor-FM-967-s90243/
- Website: lamejor.com.mx/nogales

XHNGS-FM 96.7 MHz is a commercial radio station in Nogales, Sonora, Mexico. It is owned by MVS Radio. The station carries MVS's La Mejor format.

== History ==
XHNGS received its concession on May 31, 1991. It was owned by José Manuel Aguirre Gómez. In 1994, Aguirre Gómez sold XHNGS to Radio Globo Nogales. Until 2013, it was known as FM Globo, even when that format was replaced across most of MVS Radio.

In 2013, XHNGS finally left the FM Globo format to flip to La Mejor.
