= XHUU-FM =

Radio station in Colima, Colima, Mexico

XHUU-FM / XEUU-AM
- Colima, Colima, Mexico; Mexico
- Frequency: 92.5 (MHz) / 1080 (kHz)
- Branding: La Mejor

Programming
- Format: Regional Mexican
- Affiliations: MVS Radio

Ownership
- Owner: Radio Colima, S.A.
- Sister stations: XHCOC-FM

History
- First air date: October 25, 1974 (concession); 1994 (FM)

Technical information
- Power: 1,000 watts daytime 130 watts nighttime (AM)
- ERP: 10,000 watts (FM)

Links
- Website: lamejor.com.mx/colima

XHUU-FM/XEUU-AM is an AM-FM combo Regional Mexican radio station in Colima, Colima, Mexico.
