= XHBH-FM =

Radio station in Hermosillo, Sonora, Mexico

- Hermosillo, Sonora; Mexico
- Frequency: 98.5 MHz
- Branding: La Mejor

Programming
- Format: Grupera

Ownership
- Owner: MVS Radio; (Stereorey México, S.A.)

History
- First air date: November 20, 1935 (concession); 1994 (FM)
- Former call signs: XEXA-AM/XHEXA-FM (early 2000s) XEBH-AM (1935–2017)
- Former frequencies: 930 kHz, 920 kHz, 590 kHz

Technical information
- Licensing authority: CRT
- Class: B1
- ERP: 3 kW
- HAAT: 287.4 m (943 ft)
- Transmitter coordinates: 29°7′56.8″N 110°56′3.2″W

Links
- Webcast: Listen live
- Website: lamejor.com.mx/hermosillo

XHBH-FM 98.5 is a radio station in Hermosillo, Sonora, Mexico. It carries the La Mejor national format from MVS Radio.

== History ==
XEBH-AM was the first radio station in Hermosillo. It came to air on November 20, 1935, inaugurated by Governor Ramón Ramos. The 500-watt station initially broadcast on 930 kHz and was soon joined by shortwave simulcast XEBR on 11,820 kHz. The first concessionaire was Carlos G. Balderrama.

By the 1960s, XEBH had moved down the dial to 920. It was owned by Radiodifusores de Sonora, S. de R.L., the concessionaire for the station until it was sold to MVS in 1994.

The station added an FM combo in 1994, XHBH-FM 98.5. In the 2000s, it moved to 590 kHz as part of a swap with XEHQ, then on 590.

In 2001, MVS introduced its Exa FM pop format to Hermosillo. Along with a number of other Exa FM stations nationwide, XEBH-XHBH became XEXA-XHEXA; eventually, the XHEXA-FM call sign exclusively moved to Mexico City 104.9 and the XEBH-XHBH call signs were restored. In 2005, the station changed to grupera as La Mejor.

The AM frequency was surrendered by MVS Radio to the IFT effective September 14, 2017.
