= XHNQ-FM (Guerrero) =

Radio station in Acapulco, Guerrero, Mexico

- Acapulco, Guerrero; Mexico
- Frequency: 99.3 FM
- Branding: Exa FM

Programming
- Format: Spanish & English Top 40 (CHR)

Ownership
- Owner: MVS Radio; (Stereorey México, S.A.)
- Sister stations: XHSE-FM

History
- First air date: July 23, 1976 (concession)

Technical information
- Class: B
- ERP: 14.46 kW
- Transmitter coordinates: 16°51′42″N 99°53′11″W

Links
- Webcast: Listen live
- Website: exafm.com

XHNQ-FM is a radio station in Acapulco, Guerrero, Mexico on 99.3 FM. It is owned by MVS Radio and carries the Exa FM national format.
