= XHAK-FM =

Radio station in Acámbaro, Guanajuato, Mexico

- Acámbaro, Guanajuato; Mexico
- Frequency: 89.7 MHz
- Branding: La Mejor FM

Programming
- Format: Regional Mexican
- Affiliations: MVS Radio

Ownership
- Owner: Organización Radiofónica de Acámbaro, S.A. de C.V.
- Sister stations: XHVW-FM

History
- First air date: 1980
- Former call signs: XEAK-AM
- Former frequencies: 890 AM

Technical information
- Class: AA
- ERP: 6,000 watts (FM)
- HAAT: -58.7 m
- Transmitter coordinates: 20°02′15″N 100°45′33″W

Links
- Webcast: Listen live
- Website: lamejor.com.mx

XHAK-FM is a radio station in Mexico, broadcasting at 89.7 FM in Acámbaro, Guanajuato, Mexico. It carries the La Mejor FM grupera format from MVS Radio and is owned by Organización Radiofónica de Acámbaro along with XHVW-FM 90.5.

== History ==
=== Callsign ===
XEAK were also the original call letters of a border-blaster radio station licensed to the Tijuana / Rosarito area of the Mexican state of Baja California. Branded as The Mighty 690, the original XEAK was one of the first rock music stations to broadcast to Southern California. The Tijuana station dropped the XEAK call sign in 1961, but continues to broadcast today with the call sign XEWW-AM.

=== In Acámbaro ===
XHAK "La Consentida" logo used from 2013 to 2017

The XEAK calls returned when a new XEAK-AM was authorized in 1980, this time in Acámbaro, Guanajuato, to Sergio Fajardo Ortiz. The station initially received authorization to operate on 1600 kHz, soon sliding down to 890.

The FM migration was authorized in 2013. In 2017, XHAK and XHVW picked up MVS Radio formats.

== See also ==
- Border blaster
