= XHCJX-FM =

Radio station in Bahía de Banderas, Nayarit, Mexico

- Bahía de Banderas, Nayarit; Mexico
- Broadcast area: Puerto Vallarta, Jalisco
- Frequency: 99.9 FM
- Branding: La Mejor

Programming
- Format: Regional Mexican

Ownership
- Owner: MVS Radio; (Stereorey México, S.A.)

History
- First air date: April 3, 1995 (concession)
- Call sign meaning: From "Cruz de Juanacaxtle"

Technical information
- Licensing authority: CRT
- Class: B
- ERP: 50 kW
- HAAT: 43.82 m (143.8 ft)

Links
- Webcast: Listen live
- Website: lamejor.com.mx

XHCJX-FM is a radio station on 99.9 FM in Bahía de Banderas, Nayarit, Mexico—primarily serving Puerto Vallarta, Jalisco—and carries the La Mejor regional Mexican format from its owner, MVS Radio.

== History ==
XHCJX received its concession on March 14, 1997. It was owned by Carmen Amalia Bernal Mendoza until being sold to MVS in 2000. Under MVS, the station initially carried its Stereorey adult contemporary format before switching to Exa FM in 2001 and then to La Mejor in 2015.
