= XHHW-FM =

Radio station in Mazatlán, Sinaloa

XHHW-FM/XEHW-AM
- Mazatlán, Sinaloa; Mexico
- Frequencies: 102.7 FM; 600 AM
- Branding: La Mejor

Programming
- Format: Regional Mexican
- Affiliations: MVS Radio

Ownership
- Owner: Radiosistema del Noroeste; (Manuel Francisco Pérez Muñoz)

History
- First air date: April 5, 1957 (concession)
- Former frequencies: 1440 kHz, 600 kHz, 101.9 MHz

Technical information
- Licensing authority: CRT
- Class: B
- Power: 800 watts Day
- ERP: 50,000 kW
- HAAT: 136.1 m (447 ft)
- Transmitter coordinates: 23°03′37.1″N 106°13′08.6″W

Links
- Webcast: Listen live (via TuneIn)
- Website: lamejor.com.mx/plaza/mazatlan

XHHW-FM/XEHW-AM is a radio station combo on 102.7 FM and 600 AM in Mazatlán, Sinaloa. It is owned by Radiosistema del Noroeste and carries the La Mejor Regional Mexican format from MVS Radio.

== History ==
XEHW-AM 1440, originally located in El Rosario, received its concession on April 5, 1957. The 250-watt station was owned by Luis Pandoja Parra. In the 1990s, XEHW moved its primary transmitter to Chametla and raised power to 5 kW day and 1 kW night.

In 2011, XEHW was authorized to migrate to FM as XHHW-FM 101.9. In 2013, XHHW was authorized to move to 102.7 FM from a transmitter in El Rosario and raise its effective radiated power from 25,000 to 50,000 watts—higher than almost all other AM-FM migrants, as migrating stations were initially only allowed 25 kW ERP. The AM station was moved at the same time and decreased its nighttime power to 800 watts.
