= XHMPM-FM =

Radio station in Los Mochis, Sinaloa, Mexico

- Los Mochis, Sinaloa (San Blas); Mexico
- Broadcast area: Northern Sinaloa; Eastern Baja California; Southern Sonora
- Frequency: 98.9 MHz
- Branding: Exa FM

Programming
- Format: Pop
- Affiliations: MVS Radio

Ownership
- Owner: RSN; (Radio Topolobampo, S.A. de C.V.)
- Sister stations: XHHS-FM, XHCF-FM

History
- First air date: November 2, 1980
- Former call signs: XEIF-AM, XEREY-AM, XEMPM-AM
- Former frequencies: 1240 kHz, 1030 kHz
- Call sign meaning: Manuel Pérez Muñoz

Technical information
- Licensing authority: CRT
- Class: B
- ERP: 25,000 watts
- HAAT: 127 m (417 ft)
- Transmitter coordinates: 25°48′32″N 108°58′10″W

Links
- Webcast: Listen live
- Website: exafm.com

XHMPM-FM is a Spanish-language Top 40 radio station located in Los Mochis, Sinaloa, Mexico. It broadcasts on 98.9 MHz on FM from a tower located on Cerro La Memoria in Los Mochis.

== History ==
On November 2, 1980, Radio Topolobampo, S.A. signed on XEIF-AM on 1240 kHz, with transmitter located at Charay, Sinaloa. XEIF changed calls twice: to XEREY-AM, matching its name as Radio Reyna, and then by 1994 to XEMPM-AM, now on 1030 kHz, known as Radio Fama.

In 2010, the station changed its name to La Pesada with a Regional Mexican format and local news. On November 3, of that same year, XEMPM was authorized to migrate to FM, and XHMPM-FM 98.9 came to air at the end of January 2011.

After the failure of La Pesada, Radiosistema del Noroeste affiliated with MVS Radio to launch its Exa FM format in Los Mochis, effective May 14, 2011.
