= XHAGC-FM =

Radio station in Aguascalientes, Aguascalientes, Mexico

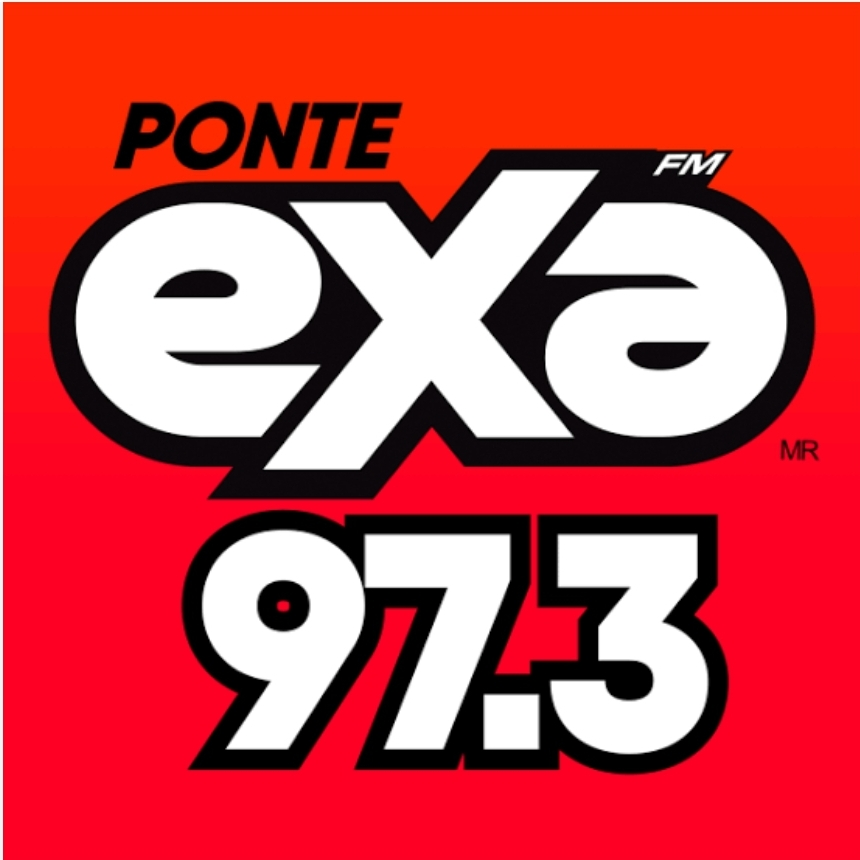
- Aguascalientes, Aguascalientes; Mexico
- Frequency: 97.3 MHz
- Branding: Exa FM

Programming
- Format: Spanish & English Top 40 (CHR)
- Affiliations: MVS Radio

Ownership
- Owner: Radio Universal; (Radio Excedra, S.A. de C.V.)
- Sister stations: XHPLA-FM, XHAGT-FM, XHCAA-FM XHAC-FM

History
- First air date: September 8, 1978 (concession)
- Call sign meaning: "Aguascalientes"

Technical information
- Licensing authority: CRT
- Class: B
- ERP: 50,000 watts
- HAAT: 77.5 meters (254 ft)

Links
- Webcast: Listen live
- Website: exafm.com

XHAGC-FM is a radio station on 97.3 FM in Aguascalientes, Aguascalientes, Mexico. It is owned by Radio Universal and carries the Exa FM pop format from MVS Radio.

== History ==
XHAGC came to air during the late 1970s as an adult contemporary Spanish station under the name of Sono Imagen, a name that lasted for two decades. In 1996, after Radio Universal formed a partnership with MVS, 97.3 FM took on the latter's FM Globo format. On October 1, 2001, this station became CHR-formatted Exa FM, continuing the relationship with MVS.
