= XHGY-FM =

Radio station in Tehuacán, Puebla

- Tehuacán, Puebla; Mexico
- Frequency: 100.7 MHz
- Branding: La Mejor

Programming
- Format: Grupera
- Affiliations: MVS Radio

Ownership
- Owner: Radio TH Comunicación; (Radio Tehuacán, S.A. de C.V.)
- Sister stations: XHWJ-FM

History
- First air date: May 10, 1957 (concession)

Technical information
- ERP: 25 kW
- Transmitter coordinates: 18°27′24.6″N 97°25′20.4″W

Links
- Website: lamejor.com.mx/tehuacan

XHGY-FM is a radio station on 100.7 FM in Tehuacán, Puebla. It carries the La Mejor grupera format from MVS Radio.

== History ==
XEGY-AM 1070 received its concession on May 10, 1957 and broadcast with 1,000 watts. Full broadcasts began in 1960 under the Radio Lobo name. The concessionaire is currently owned by the Sánchez Tinoco family; it has had several different studios and owners over the years.

XEGY was cleared to move to FM in 2011.
