= XHVE-FM =

Radio station in Boca del Río, Veracruz, Mexico

- Veracruz, Veracruz; Mexico
- Frequency: 100.5 MHz
- Branding: La Mejor FM

Programming
- Format: Regional Mexican

Ownership
- Owner: MVS Radio; (Stereorey México, S.A.)
- Sister stations: XHPS-FM

History
- First air date: 1975
- Former frequencies: 102.1 MHz
- Call sign meaning: Veracruz

Technical information
- ERP: 92.07 kW

Links
- Website: lamejor.com.mx/veracruz

XHVE-FM is a Mexican radio station based in Boca del Río, Veracruz. It is owned by MVS Radio and carries its La Mejor FM Regional Mexican format.

== History ==
The original concession for the station, originally on 102.1 MHz, was awarded in 1975. The station originally broadcast the Stereorey English-language contemporary music format. In 2002, the Stereorey stations began to broadcast Best FM, which broadcast English-language music from the 1980s to the 2000s.

In 2005, it changed its format to La Mejor FM, a grupera format.
