= XHHS-FM =

Radio station in Los Mochis, Sinaloa, Mexico

XHHS-FM / XEHS-AM
- Los Mochis, Sinaloa; Mexico
- Broadcast area: Northern Sinaloa; Eastern Baja California; Southern Sonora
- Frequency: 90.9 MHz / 540 khz
- Branding: La Mejor

Programming
- Format: Regional Mexican
- Affiliations: MVS Radio

Ownership
- Owner: RSN; (Radiodifusora XEHS, S.A. de C.V.)
- Sister stations: XHCF-FM, XHMPM-FM

History
- First air date: November 16, 1957
- Former frequencies: 1280 kHz (1957–1990s)

Technical information
- Licensing authority: CRT
- Class: B
- Power: 5 kW
- ERP: 25 kW
- HAAT: 127 m (417 ft)
- Transmitter coordinates: 25°48′32″N 108°58′10″W

Links
- Webcast: Listen live
- Website: lamejor.com.mx

XHHS-FM/XEHS-AM is a radio station combo on 90.9 FM and 540 AM in Los Mochis, Sinaloa, Mexico. It is owned by RSN and carries the La Mejor Regional Mexican format from MVS Radio.

== History ==
XEHS-AM 1280 received its concession on November 16, 1957. The 250-watt station was owned by Benito L. Juárez, and in the 1960s, Juárez sold XEHS to Manuel Ceferino Pérez Alvarado. Control was soon after consolidated in a corporation. In the 1990s, XEHS moved to 540 kHz, enabling a daytime power increase to 5,000 watts and a nighttime bump to 2,500 watts. XHHS-FM was approved in 2010, and in 2015, XHHS-FM was authorized to increase power from 4 to 25 kW.

XEHS-AM remains on the air in a continuity obligation, to serve 27,552 people in its coverage area unserved by any other broadcast service.
