= WWFL =

- Clermont, Florida; United States
- Broadcast area: Lake County, Florida
- Frequency: 1340 kHz
- Branding: La Mejor 96.1FM/1340AM

Programming
- Format: Regional Mexican
- Affiliations: MVS Radio

Ownership
- Owner: Onda Mexicana Radio Group, Inc.

History
- Call sign meaning: FLorida

Technical information
- Licensing authority: FCC
- Facility ID: 33215
- Class: C
- Power: 1,000 watts unlimited
- Transmitter coordinates: 28°34′59″N 81°42′19″W
- Translator: 96.1 W241CR (Clermont)

Links
- Public license information: Public file; LMS
- Website: lamejor.com.mx/orlando

WWFL (1340 AM) is a radio station licensed to Clermont, Florida, United States, serving the Lake County area. The station is currently owned by Onda Mexicana Radio Group, Inc. The station has a very small coverage area. Decent signal can only be received from a 6-mile radius from the radio tower.

Logo before translator sign on

In March 2016, the station jettisoned its locally programmed Regional Mexican format, known as Onda Mexicana, to take the La Mejor format from Mexican company MVS Radio.

== FCC troubles ==
The Federal Communications Commission levied a fine against WWFL in 2012 to which WWFL never responded that corrective action had been taken. In January 2013, Commission inspectors personally arrived at the station to warn the station which elicited no response. This lack of response earned WWFL a 2nd fine of $8,000. From Inside Radio, Tampa District Director Ralph Barlow wrote: “Misconduct of this type is serious and threatens to compromise the Commission’s ability to adequately investigate violations of its rules”.
