= XHXP-FM =

Radio station in Tuxtepec, Oaxaca, Mexico

- Tuxtepec, Oaxaca; Mexico
- Frequency: 106.5 MHz
- Branding: La Mejor

Programming
- Format: Grupera
- Affiliations: MVS Radio

Ownership
- Owner: ORP; (Sostenes Bravo Rodríguez)
- Sister stations: XHUH-FM

History
- First air date: August 27, 1964 (concession)
- Call sign meaning: "Tuxtepec"

Technical information
- ERP: 25 kW
- Transmitter coordinates: 18°04′56″N 96°09′08″W

Links
- Webcast: Listen live
- Website: lamejor.com.mx

XHXP-FM is a radio station on 106.5 FM in Tuxtepec, Oaxaca, Mexico. It carries the La Mejor grupera format from MVS Radio.

== History ==
XEXP-AM 1200 received its concession on August 27, 1964. It was owned by Ricardo Moreno Flores and broadcast as a daytimer with 250 watts, soon increased to 500 watts on 1150 kHz. Bravo Rodríguez acquired XEXP in 1977.

XEXP moved to 106.5 FM after obtaining approval to migrate to FM in 2010.
