= XHMD-FM =

Radio station in León, Guanajuato

- León, Guanajuato, Mexico; Mexico
- Broadcast area: León, Guanajuato
- Frequency: 104.1 FM
- Branding: Exa FM

Programming
- Format: Pop

Ownership
- Owner: MVS Radio; (Stereorey México, S.A.)
- Sister stations: XHSO-FM

History
- First air date: July 16, 1976 (concession)
- Former frequencies: 96.7 MHz

Technical information
- Class: B
- ERP: 50 kW
- HAAT: 85.4 meters (280 ft)
- Transmitter coordinates: 21°07′28.7″N 101°43′35.9″W

Links
- Webcast: Listen live
- Website: exafm.com

XHMD-FM is a radio station on 104.1 FM in León, Guanajuato. The station is owned by MVS Radio and carries its Exa FM pop format.

== History ==
XHMD received its first concession on July 16, 1976. It has always been owned by MVS through several different concessionaires.
