= XHPT-FM =

Radio station in Córdoba, Veracruz, Mexico

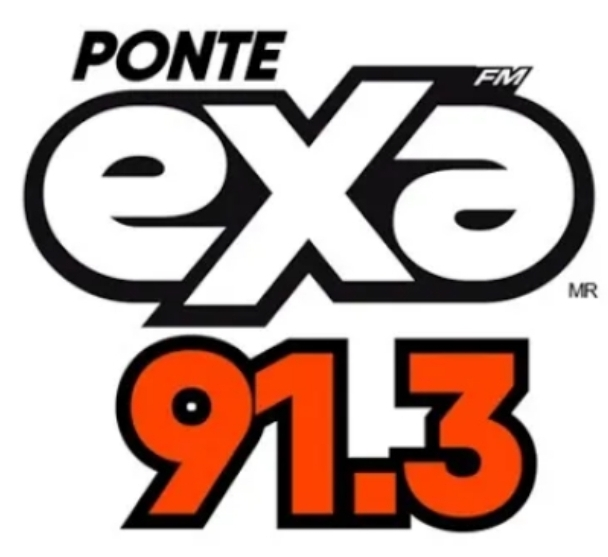
- Córdoba, Veracruz; Mexico
- Frequency: 91.3 FM
- Branding: Exa FM

Programming
- Format: Contemporary hit radio
- Affiliations: MVS Radio

Ownership
- Owner: Radio Comunicaciones de las Altas Montañas; (X.E.A.G, S.A.)
- Sister stations: XHAG-FM, XHPG-FM

History
- First air date: January 23, 1973 (concession)

Technical information
- ERP: 18 kW
- HAAT: -10.72 meters
- Transmitter coordinates: 18°53′59″N 96°57′50″W

Links
- Webcast: Listen live
- Website: exafm.com

XHPT-FM is a radio station on 91.3 FM in Córdoba, Veracruz, Mexico. It is owned by Radio Comunicaciones de las Altas Montañas and carries the Exa FM national format from MVS Radio.

== History ==
XHPT received its concession on January 23, 1973, and was the first FM station in the city of Córdoba. It was owned by Carlos Julio Suastegui Fentanes and known as Fórmula Musical 91.3. In July 2008, it was acquired by Grupo Radio Digital and became an Exa FM franchise station. Power was increased to 18 kW in 2012.

In 2019, Radio Comunicaciones de las Altas Montañas began operating the station on Grupo Radio Digital's behalf. In November 2024, the Federal Telecommunications Institute (IFT) authorized the transfer of the XHPT-FM concession to the Libreros Trejo family, owner of Radio Comunicaciones de Altas Montañas, as X.E.A.G, S.A.
