= KEXA =

American radio station

- King City, California; United States
- Broadcast area: Salinas Valley, California
- Frequency: 93.9 MHz
- Branding: La Jefa

Programming
- Format: Regional Mexican

Ownership
- Owner: Daniel Alcantar; (Inspiration Media Network, LLC)

History
- First air date: 1982
- Call sign meaning: Format patterned after Exa FM

Technical information
- Licensing authority: FCC
- Facility ID: 67104
- Class: B1
- ERP: 5,400 watts
- HAAT: 214 meters (702 ft)
- Transmitter coordinates: 36°22′48″N 121°12′57″W

Links
- Public license information: Public file; LMS

KEXA (93.9 FM) is an radio station licensed to King City, California, United States, serving Southern Monterey County. KEXA-FM is licensed to and operated by Daniel Alcantar, through licensee Inspiration Media Network, LLC.

KEXA previously had a bilingual Top 40 format named Exa FM until May 2, 2008 that was targeted at the Salinas Valley's Hispanic population. It had licensed the format from MVS Radio of Mexico.
