= XHPLA-FM =

Radio station in Aguascalientes, Aguascalientes, Mexico

- Aguascalientes, Aguascalientes; Mexico
- Frequency: 91.3 MHz
- Branding: La Mexicana

Programming
- Format: Regional Mexican

Ownership
- Owner: Radio Universal; (Radio Libertad, S.A. de C.V.)
- Sister stations: XHAGT-FM, XHAGC-FM, XHCAA-FM, XHAC-FM

History
- First air date: January 12, 1979 (concession)
- Call sign meaning: "Pabellón de Arteaga"

Technical information
- Licensing authority: CRT
- Class: B1
- ERP: 25 kW
- HAAT: 47.5 meters (156 ft)
- Transmitter coordinates: 21°55′12.4″N 102°15′59.8″W

Links
- Webcast: Listen live
- Website: radiouniversal.mx

XHPLA-FM is a radio station in Aguascalientes, Aguascalientes. Broadcasting on 91.3 FM, XHPLA-FM is owned by Radio Universal and carries a Regional Mexican format known as La Mexicana.

== History ==
XEPLA-AM 860 received its concession on January 12, 1979. It was originally located in Pabellón de Arteaga.

The station migrated to FM after being authorized to do so in December 2011.

== See also ==
- Television stations in Aguascalientes
- List of television stations in Mexico
- List of radio stations in Aguascalientes
