= XHPX-FM =

Radio station in Ciudad Juárez, Chihuahua, Mexico, serving El Paso, Texas

- Ciudad Juárez, Chihuahua; Mexico
- Broadcast area: El Paso, Texas; Ciudad Juárez, Chihuahua
- Frequency: 98.3 FM
- Branding: Exa FM

Programming
- Format: Contemporary hit radio

Ownership
- Owner: MVS Radio; (Stereorey México, S.A.)

History
- First air date: 1977 (concession)
- Former frequencies: 93.7 MHz

Technical information
- Licensing authority: CRT
- Class: C
- ERP: 100,000 watts
- HAAT: 553 metres (1,814 ft)
- Transmitter coordinates: 31°40′15.7″N 106°31′09.3″W

Links
- Webcast: Listen live
- Website: exafm.com

XHPX-FM (98.3 MHz) is a Spanglish contemporary hit radio station in Ciudad Juárez, Chihuahua, Mexico. It broadcasts from studios on Mesa Street in El Paso, Texas, United States, with its transmitter atop Cerro Bola in Juárez.

== History ==
XHPX received its concession on October 18, 1977, though it had been on the air for several years by that point and had changed frequencies from 93.7 MHz in 1974. The concession was held by Ángel Beltrán Elizarraraz, but the station was operated by MVS from the start, first with the Stereorey format (later moved to XHTO-FM) and later FM Globo format. In 2000, the station became one of the original Exa FM stations. Most operations moved to studios in El Paso in 2005.

In 1993, it was sold to F.M. Globo de Juárez, S.A. de C.V., which in turn transferred the concession to Frecuencia Modulada de Mexicali in May 1999, MVS de Juárez in December 1999, and Stereorey México in 2012. All are subsidiaries of MVS.

== See also ==
- Border blaster
