= XHQW-FM =

Radio station in Mérida, Yucatán, Mexico

- Mérida, Yucatán; Mexico
- Frequency: 90.1 MHz
- Branding: La Mejor

Programming
- Format: Grupera

Ownership
- Owner: MVS Radio; (Stereorey México, S.A.)
- Sister stations: XHMRA-FM

History
- First air date: October 15, 1947 (concession)
- Former call signs: XEQW-AM
- Former frequencies: 550 kHz

Technical information
- ERP: 25 kW
- Transmitter coordinates: 20°58′55.6″N 89°41′7.8″W

Links
- Webcast: Listen live
- Website: lamejor.com.mx

XHQW-FM is a radio station on 90.1 FM in Mérida, Yucatán, Mexico. It is owned by MVS Radio and carries the La Mejor grupera format.

== History ==
XEQW-AM 550 received its concession on October 15, 1947. It was owned by Radio Mexicana de Mérida, S.A. and broadcast with 2,000 watts daytime and 200, later 350, watts at night.

It migrated to FM after being authorized on January 24, 2012. Grupo Rivas, through concessionaire Radio Poderosa, S.A. de C.V., sold the station to MVS Radio directly in 2015.
