= XHPVTS-FM =

Radio station in Villa de Tututepec de Melchor Ocampo, Oaxaca, Mexico

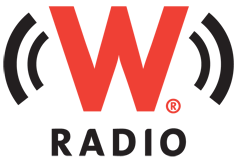
- Villa de Tututepec de Melchor Ocampo, Oaxaca; Mexico
- Frequency: 98.5 FM
- Branding: W Radio

Programming
- Format: News/talk
- Affiliations: Radiópolis

Ownership
- Owner: Grupo ROJAZ; (Radio Casandoo, S.A. de C.V.)
- Sister stations: XHPTUX-FM Tuxtepec

History
- First air date: November 2018
- Call sign meaning: Villa Tututepec/Santiago Jocotepec

Technical information
- Class: A
- ERP: 2.97 kW
- HAAT: 171.1 m
- Transmitter coordinates: 16°08′03.96″N 97°36′13.64″W

Links
- Webcast: Listen live

XHPVTS-FM is a radio station on 98.5 FM in Villa de Tututepec de Melchor Ocampo, Oaxaca, Mexico, with transmitter on Cerro Vista Hermosa. It is known as W Radio.

== History ==
XHPVTS was awarded in the IFT-4 radio auction of 2017. The station signed on the air in November 2018 and was formally inaugurated on December 13 of that year.
