= XHSE-FM =

Radio station in Acapulco, Guerrero, Mexico

- Acapulco, Guerrero; Mexico
- Frequency: 100.1 MHz
- Branding: La Mejor FM

Programming
- Format: Grupera

Ownership
- Owner: MVS Radio; (Stereorey México, S.A.)
- Sister stations: XHNQ-FM

History
- First air date: August 2, 1969 (concession)

Technical information
- ERP: 14.46 kW

Links
- Webcast: Listen live
- Website: lamejor.com.mx

XHSE-FM is a radio station on 100.1 FM in Acapulco, Guerrero, Mexico. It carries the La Mejor FM grupera format of its owner, MVS Radio.

== History ==
XHSE received its concession on August 2, 1969. It has always been owned by MVS. The station originally broadcast the Stereorey contemporary music format until it was phased out nationally in favor of a newer music format known as Best FM in 2002. The station was known as Aire 100.1 from 2005 and 2006, when it began broadcasting its present format.
