= XHJT-FM =

Radio station in Tampico, Tamaulipas, Mexico

- Tampico, Tamaulipas; Mexico
- Frequency: 100.1 MHz
- RDS: LA MEJOR FM AQUI NOMAS
- Branding: La Mejor FM

Programming
- Format: Regional Mexican

Ownership
- Owner: MVS Radio; (Stereorey México, S.A.)
- Sister stations: XHOX-FM

History
- First air date: November 22, 1979 (concession)

Technical information
- Licensing authority: CRT
- Class: B
- ERP: 30,400 watts
- HAAT: 46.43 m (152.3 ft)

Links
- Webcast: Listen live
- Website: La Mejor FM Website

XHJT-FM is a radio station on 100.1 FM in Tampico, Tamaulipas, Mexico. It is owned by MVS Radio and carries its La Mejor Regional Mexican format.

== History ==
XHJT received its concession on November 22, 1979 the third FM station on Tampico.
