= KMHR =

Radio station in Boise, Idaho

- Boise, Idaho; United States
- Broadcast area: Boise area
- Frequency: 950 kHz
- Branding: La Mejor

Programming
- Format: Regional Mexican
- Affiliations: Salem Radio Network; MVS Radio

Ownership
- Owner: Lorena Cortez and Araceli Ortega; (Azteca Media, LLC)

History
- First air date: 1961
- Former call signs: KATN (1961–1981); KKIC (1981–1987); KJHY (1987–1988); KKIC (1988–2003); KNJY (2003–2011)
- Former frequencies: 1010 kHz (1961–1968)
- Call sign meaning: Mejor

Technical information
- Licensing authority: FCC
- Facility ID: 49721
- Class: D
- Power: 3,500 watts (day); 35 watts (night)
- Transmitter coordinates: 43°37′40″N 116°30′28″W
- Translator: 98.3 K252FA (Boise)

Links
- Public license information: Public file; LMS
- Website: laley983.radiostream321.com

KMHR (950 AM) is a radio station broadcasting a Regional Mexican format. Licensed to Boise, Idaho, United States, the station serves the Boise area. The station is currently owned by Azteca Media, LLC and is branded as La Mejor.

== History ==
The station went on the air in 1961 as KATN. The call sign was KKIC on 1981-10-26. On 1987-06-23, the station changed its call sign to KJHY, on 1988-02-26 to KKIC, on 2003-08-17 to KNJY, and on 2011-08-01 to the current KMHR.

In 2011, coinciding with the launch of KMHR, First Western Inc. acquired K252FA on 98.3 MHz from the Calvary Chapel of Twin Falls and began using it to relay KMHR.

Effective April 12, 2018, First Western sold KMHR and K252FA to Azteca Media, LLC for $250,000.
