= XHCF-FM =

Radio station in Los Mochis, Sinaloa, Mexico

- Los Mochis, Sinaloa; Mexico
- Broadcast area: Northern Sinaloa; Eastern Baja California; Southern Sonora
- Frequency: 93.3 MHz
- Branding: La Mexicana

Programming
- Format: Grupera

Ownership
- Owner: Radiosistema del Noroeste; (XECF Radio Impactos 14-10, S.A.)
- Sister stations: XHMPM-FM XHHS-FM

History
- First air date: April 11, 1941
- Former call signs: XECF-AM
- Former frequencies: 1410 kHz

Technical information
- Licensing authority: CRT
- Class: B1
- ERP: 25 kW
- HAAT: 127 m (417 ft)
- Transmitter coordinates: 25°48′32″N 108°58′10″W

XHCF-FM is a radio station on 93.3 FM in Los Mochis, Sinaloa, Mexico. It is owned by Radiosistema del Noroeste and is known as La Mexicana.

== History ==
XECF-AM 1410 received its concession on February 28, 1940, and signed on April 11, 1941, as the first radio station in the city. It was owned by Francisco Pérez H., sold to La Voz del Valle del Fuerte, S.A. in 1956 and then was acquired by Francisco Pérez Alvarado in 1965. The current concessionaire was created in 1977, and in the 1990s, XECF increased its power to 10,000 watts during the day.

XHCF-FM was authorized in 2010 and permitted to increase its effective radiated power from 4 kW to 25 in 2015.
