= XHJM-FM =

Radio station in Monterrey, Mexico

- Guadalupe-Monterrey, Nuevo León; Mexico
- Broadcast area: Monterrey, Nuevo León
- Frequency: 88.1 MHz (HD Radio)
- Branding: Globo

Programming
- Format: Romantic

Ownership
- Owner: Universidad Regiomontana; (Radio Contenidos, S.A. de C.V.)
- Operator: MVS Radio
- Sister stations: XHSRO-FM, XHSR-FM

History
- First air date: January 29, 1957 (concession); June 18, 2018 (FM)
- Former call signs: XEJM-AM
- Former frequencies: 1450 kHz (1957–2019)
- Call sign meaning: "Joyas Musicales", original name

Technical information
- Licensing authority: CRT
- Class: A
- ERP: 3 kW
- HAAT: −37.8 meters (−124 ft)
- Transmitter coordinates: 25°38′48.8″N 100°18′46.7″W

Links
- Webcast: Listen live
- Website: fmglobo.com

XHJM-FM is a radio station on 88.1 FM in Monterrey, Nuevo León, Mexico. The station is operated by MVS Radio and carries its Globo romantic format.

== History ==
XEJM-AM 1450 received its concession on January 29, 1957. It was owned by the Garza family doing business as Radio Regiomontana, S.A. and originally was "Joyas Musicales", Monterrey's classical music station and sister to XET-AM 990. Other musical genres began to appear on the station as the 1960s began, and in 1963, XEJM ended its classical phase.

XEJM was sold to a Multimedios Radio concessionaire in 2004. The concessionaire changed to Radio Contenidos in 2011. During much of this time, the station served as an AM simulcast of XET-FM 94.1.

U-ERRE took over XEJM in 2017 after acquiring the station in October 2016. During this time, the station was U-ERRE Radio, with programming hosted and directed by university students. The AM station broadcast with 5,000 watts day and 1,000 watts night.

On Monday, June 18, 2018, XHJM-FM 88.1 signed on the air, migrating XEJM to FM. Coinciding with the move, MVS Radio began operating XHJM, with U-ERRE Radio becoming online-only; though it did not immediately announce a new format, TuneIn was updated with information indicating that MVS would bring its heritage FM Globo brand, which had been on just two stations at the start of the year, to XHJM. The AM station was turned off in June 2019 after the required year of simulcasting.
