= XHERJ-FM =

Radio station in Mazatlán, Sinaloa, Mexico

- Mazatlán, Sinaloa; Mexico
- Frequency: 105.1 MHz
- Branding: Ke Buena

Programming
- Format: Regional Mexican
- Affiliations: Radiópolis

Ownership
- Owner: Promomedios Sinaloa; (Radio RJ de Mazatlán, S.A. de C.V.)
- Sister stations: XHOPE-FM

History
- First air date: January 10, 1940 (concession)
- Former call signs: XERJ-AM
- Former frequencies: 1320 kHz, 107.5 MHz

Technical information
- Licensing authority: CRT
- Class: B1
- ERP: 25 kW
- HAAT: −25.9 m (−85 ft)
- Transmitter coordinates: 23°13′06″N 106°23′03.2″W

Links
- Website: gpmtuportal.com

XHERJ-FM is a radio station on 105.1 FM in Mazatlán, Sinaloa. It is owned by Promomedios Sinaloa and carries the Ke Buena Regional Mexican format from Radiópolis.

== History ==
XERJ-AM 1320 received its concession on January 10, 1940. It was owned by Oscar Pérez Escobosa, and by the 1960s, XERJ, which had been transferred to Radio Mazatlán, S.A. in 1958, broadcast with 5,000 watts day and 500 night—a power level it would retain for decades.

XERJ migrated to FM in 2010 as XHERJ-FM 107.5. As part of the 2017 renewal of XHERJ's concession, it was moved to 105.1 MHz on July 8, 2018 in order to clear 106-108 MHz as much as possible for community and indigenous radio stations.

XHERJ abandoned the "La Nueva RJ" name in March 2026, when it became a national Ke Buena format from Radiópolis, after XHST-FM 94.7 ceased operations on December 31, 2025.
