= XHQAA-FM =

Radio station in Chetumal, Quintana Roo, Mexico

- Chetumal, Quintana Roo; Mexico
- Frequency: 99.3 MHz
- Branding: La Bestia Grupera

Programming
- Format: Grupera

Ownership
- Owner: Grupo Radiorama; (XEQAA-AM, S.A. de C.V.)
- Operator: Grupo Audiorama Comunicaciones

History
- First air date: October 4, 1994 (concession)
- Former frequencies: 560 kHz
- Call sign meaning: Quintana Roo

Technical information
- Licensing authority: CRT
- Class: B1
- ERP: 25 kW
- HAAT: 71.2 m
- Transmitter coordinates: 18°32′33″N 88°16′09″W

XHQAA-FM is a radio station on 99.3 FM in Chetumal, Quintana Roo, Mexico, carrying the La Bestia Grupera Grupera format.

== History ==
XEQAA-AM 560 received its concession in October 1994. While it was owned by Radiorama since it signed on, operation of the station at times in recent years has been shifted to Luna Medios, a local operator.

XEQAA migrated to FM in 2012 on 99.3 MHz.
