= XHSC-FM =

Imagen Radio station in Guadalajara

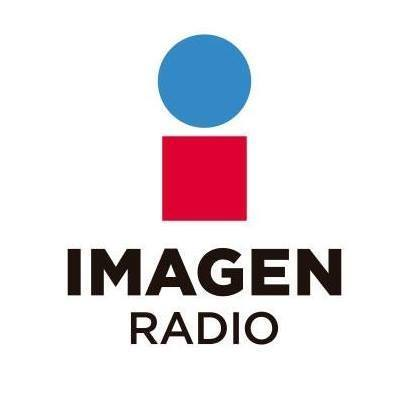
- Zapopan, Jalisco; Mexico
- Broadcast area: Guadalajara, Jalisco
- Frequency: 93.9 MHz
- Branding: Imagen Radio

Programming
- Format: News/talk

Ownership
- Owner: Grupo Imagen; (GIM Televisión Nacional, S.A. de C.V.)
- Sister stations: XHVOZ-FM, XHCTGD-TDT

History
- First air date: Mid-1970s

Technical information
- Licensing authority: CRT
- Class: C1
- ERP: 200,000 watts
- HAAT: 53.06 meters (174.1 ft)
- Transmitter coordinates: 20°40′23.8″N 103°22′24.1″W

Links
- Website: www.imagenguadalajara.mx

XHSC-FM is a radio station in Guadalajara. Located on 93.9 FM, XHSC-FM is owned by Grupo Imagen and carries its Imagen news/talk network.

== History ==
XHSC-FM signed on in the mid-1970s, the original concession being held by José Vargas Santamarina. Vargas Santamarina helped manage MVS Radio stations, and indeed for years this station carried MVS's FM Globo romantic music format.

In the 1990s, XHSC became Radioactivo 93.9, borrowing a format used in Mexico City on XHDL-FM, as MVS and Grupo Imagen formed the Frecuencia Modulada Mexicana alliance. When this broke up in 1999, Imagen retained XHSC, which became the Guadalajara outlet of its news/talk network.

XHSC Imagen Guadalajara Previous Logo
