= XHOX-FM (Sonora) =

Radio station in Ciudad Obregón, Sonora, Mexico

- Ciudad Obregón, Sonora; Mexico
- Frequency: 99.3 MHz
- Branding: Exa FM

Programming
- Format: Spanish & English Top 40 (CHR)
- Affiliations: MVS Radio

Ownership
- Owner: Radio Grupo García de León; (Radio Cajeme, S.A. de C.V.)
- Sister stations: XHVJS-FM

History
- First air date: November 20, 1939, in Los Mochis, Sinaloa; 1994 (FM)
- Former call signs: XEOX-AM (1939–2018)
- Former frequencies: 1230 kHz (1939–1941); 1340 kHz (1941–195?); 1430 kHz (195?–2018); 106.9 MHz (1994–2005); 106.5 MHz (2005–2018)

Technical information
- Licensing authority: CRT
- Class: B1
- ERP: 10,000 watts
- HAAT: 51.5 m (169 ft)
- Transmitter coordinates: 27°29′32″N 109°56′05″W (FM)

Links
- Webcast: Listen live
- Website: exafm.com

XHOX-FM is a radio station on 99.3 FM in Ciudad Obregón, Sonora, Mexico. It carries the national Exa FM format from MVS Radio and is owned by Radio Grupo García de León.

== History ==
XEOX-AM received its concession on September 26, 1939 and signed on on November 20 of that year from Los Mochis, Sinaloa. It was owned by Luis Felipe García de León and broadcast on 1230 kHz. The station was moved to 1340 kHz in Ciudad Obregón for economic reasons in 1941; the station would soon be moved to 1430. The current concessionaire took possession of the station in 1977, and it became an AM-FM combo in 1994, with the FM station at first broadcasting on 106.9 MHz.

In May 2005, XHOX-FM was moved from 106.9 to 106.5 MHz and increased its ERP from 3,000 to 10,000 watts. As part of its 2017 concession renewal, on May 4, 2018, XHOX-FM was moved again, this time to 99.3 MHz, in order to clear 106-108 MHz as much as possible for community and indigenous radio stations. Additionally, three months earlier on February 8, the station surrendered its AM frequency.
