= XHQT-FM (Sonora) =

Radio station in Nogales, Sonora, Mexico

- Nogales, Sonora; Mexico
- Frequency: 102.7 MHz
- Branding: Exa FM

Programming
- Format: Spanish & English Top 40 (CHR)

Ownership
- Owner: MVS Radio; (Stereorey México, S.A.)
- Sister stations: XHNGS-FM

History
- First air date: 1983

Technical information
- Licensing authority: CRT
- Class: B1
- ERP: 9.653 kW
- HAAT: 18.7 m (61 ft)

Links
- Webcast: Listen live
- Website: exafm.com/nogales

XHQT-FM is radio station on 102.7 FM in Nogales, Sonora, Mexico. The station is owned by MVS Radio and carries its Exa FM national format.

== History ==
The station received its concession in December 1983; it has been owned by MVS since it signed on.
