= XHOX-FM (Tamaulipas) =

Radio station in Tampico, Tamaulipas, Mexico

- Tampico, Tamaulipas; Mexico
- Broadcast area: Tampico, Tamaulipas
- Frequency: 95.3 FM
- RDS: EXA FM
- Branding: Exa FM

Programming
- Format: Contemporary hit radio in english and spanish format

Ownership
- Owner: MVS Radio; (Stereorey México, S.A.)
- Sister stations: XHJT-FM

History
- First air date: November 28, 1972 (concession)

Technical information
- Licensing authority: CRT
- Class: B
- ERP: 30,410 watts
- HAAT: 46.43 m (152.3 ft)

Links
- Webcast: Listen live
- Website: exa FM Website

XHOX-FM is a radio station on 95.3 FM in Tampico, Tamaulipas, Mexico. The station is owned by MVS Radio and carries its Exa FM Contemporary hit radio english and spanish format.

== History ==
While originally requested by Antonio González Aristi in 1969, Created the first FM radio station in the Tampico City into 1972. XHOX received its concession on November 28, 1972. It was owned by Ernesto Vargas Guajardo and has remained in MVS ownership ever since.
