= XHSI-FM =

Radio station in Santiago Ixcuintla, Nayarit, Mexico

- Santiago Ixcuintla, Nayarit; Mexico
- Frequency: 94.5 FM
- Branding: La Patrona

Programming
- Format: Regional Mexican

Ownership
- Owner: Rubén Darío Mondragón Rivera

History
- First air date: May 5, 1957
- Former frequencies: 1240 kHz; 94.5 MHz (2011–2014); 92.1 MHz (2014–2022)
- Call sign meaning: Santiago Ixcuintla

Technical information
- Licensing authority: CRT
- Class: B1
- ERP: 25 kW
- HAAT: 72.45 m (237.7 ft)
- Transmitter coordinates: 21°48′42″N 105°12′12″W

Links
- Webcast: www.radiopositiva.mx

XHSI-FM is a radio station on 94.5 FM in Santiago Ixcuintla, Nayarit. The station is owned by Rubén Darío Mondragón Rivera and carries a Regional Mexican format known as La Patrona.

== History ==
XHSI began as XESI-AM 1240, awarded to Julio Mondragón González on April 14, 1954. The station did not take to air until May 5, 1957.

In 2011, XESI migrated to FM as XHSI-FM. Despite being on 94.5 until January 2014, the station was given the 92.1 frequency at the start of migration.

The station was moved back to 94.5 MHz on November 14, 2022. The Federal Telecommunications Institute approved the frequency change to reduce interference to XHUX-FM in Tepic.
