= XHRO-FM =

Radio station in Guadalajara, Jalisco, Mexico

- Guadalajara, Jalisco; Mexico
- Broadcast area: Guadalajara
- Frequency: 95.5 MHz
- Branding: La Mejor

Programming
- Format: Regional Mexican

Ownership
- Owner: MVS Radio; (Stereorey México, S.A.)
- Sister stations: XHMA-FM, XHLC-FM

History
- First air date: December 17, 1968 (concession)

Technical information
- Licensing authority: CRT
- Class: C1
- ERP: 88.43 kW
- HAAT: 51.18 meters (167.9 ft)
- Transmitter coordinates: 20.68151°N 103.42448°W

Links
- Webcast: Listen live
- Website: lamejor.com.mx/guadalajara

XHRO-FM is a radio station on 95.5 FM in Guadalajara, Jalisco. The station is owned by MVS Radio and carries its La Mejor Regional Mexican format.

== History ==
XHRO received its first concession on December 17, 1968. It was owned by Elsa Gabriela Guajardo de Vargas, the wife of MVS founder Joaquín Vargas Gómez.

The station carried the Stereorey classic and contemporary English music format until September 2, 2002. As with other Stereorey stations, it first shifted to a newer music mix as Best FM before flipping to La Mejor on November 1, 2005.
