= XHSO-FM =

Radio station in León, Guanajuato, Mexico

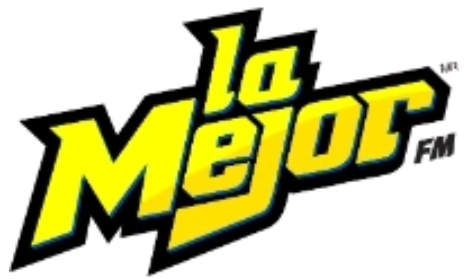
- León, Guanajuato; Mexico
- Frequency: 99.9 MHz
- Branding: La Mejor FM

Programming
- Format: Regional Mexican

Ownership
- Owner: MVS Radio; (Stereorey México, S.A.)
- Sister stations: XHMD-FM

History
- First air date: April 25, 1969 (concession)

Technical information
- Class: B
- ERP: 50 kW
- HAAT: 85.40 meters (280.2 ft)
- Transmitter coordinates: 21°07′23.4″N 101°41′20.0″W

Links
- Webcast: Listen live
- Website: lamejor.com.mx

XHSO-FM is a radio station on 99.9 FM in León, Guanajuato, Mexico. The station is owned by MVS Radio and carries its La Mejor FM Regional Mexican format.

== History ==
XHSO received its first concession on April 25, 1969. It has always been owned by MVS through several different concessionaires. It signed on broadcasting Stereorey, a contemporary music format in English. On September 2, 2002, the Stereorey format ended to give way to Best FM; on March 5, 2005, it became La Mejor FM with grupera music.
