= XHESA-FM =

Radio station in Culiacán, Sinaloa, Mexico

- Culiacán, Sinaloa; Mexico
- Frequency: 101.7 MHz
- Branding: Exa FM

Programming
- Format: Pop
- Affiliations: MVS Radio

Ownership
- Owner: Radiosistema del Noroeste; (Radiosistema de Culiacán, S.A. de C.V.)

History
- First air date: June 6, 1941 (concession)
- Former call signs: XESA-AM
- Former frequencies: 1360 kHz, 1260 kHz

Technical information
- Licensing authority: CRT
- Class: B1
- ERP: 25 kW
- HAAT: 60.3 m (198 ft)
- Transmitter coordinates: 24°49′44.16″N 107°30′21.96″W

Links
- Website: exafm.com

XHESA-FM is a radio station on 101.7 FM in Culiacán, Sinaloa, Mexico. It is owned by Radiosistema del Noroeste and carries the Exa FM pop format from MVS Radio.

== History ==
XESA-AM received its concession on June 6, 1941. It was owned by Pablos y Elizalde, S. de R.L. and broadcast on 1360 kHz. In 1971, Operadora de Radio de Culiacán, S.A., bought XESA and moved it to 1260 kHz, increasing its power from 1,000 to 5,000 watts. XESA migrated to FM in 2011.
