= XHV-FM =

Radio station in Chihuahua, Chihuahua, Mexico

- Chihuahua, Chihuahua; Mexico
- Broadcast area: Chihuahua
- Frequency: 101.7 MHz
- Branding: Radio Fórmula

Programming
- Format: Spanish news / talk

Ownership
- Owner: Grupo Fórmula; (Transmisora Regional Radio Fórmula, S.A. de C.V.)

History
- First air date: May 4, 1977 (concession)
- Former call signs: XEV-AM
- Former frequencies: 880 kHz

Technical information
- Licensing authority: CRT
- Class: B1
- ERP: 25,000 watts
- HAAT: −11 m (−36 ft)
- Transmitter coordinates: 28°48′06.2″N 106°09′10.2″W

Links
- Website: radioformulachihuahua.com

XHV-FM is a Spanish news / talk radio station in Chihuahua, Chihuahua, owned and operated by Radio Fórmula.

== History ==
XEV-AM 1390 received its concession on May 4, 1977. It was owned by Ernesto Chapa Terrazas. In the 1990s, it moved to 880 kHz and raised its power from 1,000 to 5,000 watts.

XHV formerly broadcast on AM as XEV-AM 880. The AM-FM migration changed the station's call sign to XHV-FM, which had been the callsign of 102.5 FM in Mexico City from 1967 to 1991.
