= XHLUP-FM =

Radio station in Compostela, Nayarit

- Compostela, Nayarit; Mexico
- Frequency: 89.1 FM
- Branding: Esteréo Sol

Programming
- Format: Regional Mexican

Ownership
- Owner: Adacari Bus, S.A. de C.V.

History
- First air date: July 28, 1973 (concession)

Technical information
- ERP: 25 kW
- Transmitter coordinates: 21°10′28″N 105°07′53″W

Links
- Website: XHLUP-FM on Facebook

XHLUP-FM is a radio station on 89.1 FM in Compostela, Nayarit. The station is owned by Adacari Bus and carries a Regional Mexican format known as Esteréo Sol.

== History ==
XEEF-AM 1130 received its concession on July 28, 1973, and was awarded to Julio Mondragón González.

By the 1990s, the station's name was changed to XELUP-AM.

It received its approval to migrate to FM in 2011 as XHLUP-FM on 89.1.
