= XHMVS-FM =

Radio station in Mexico City

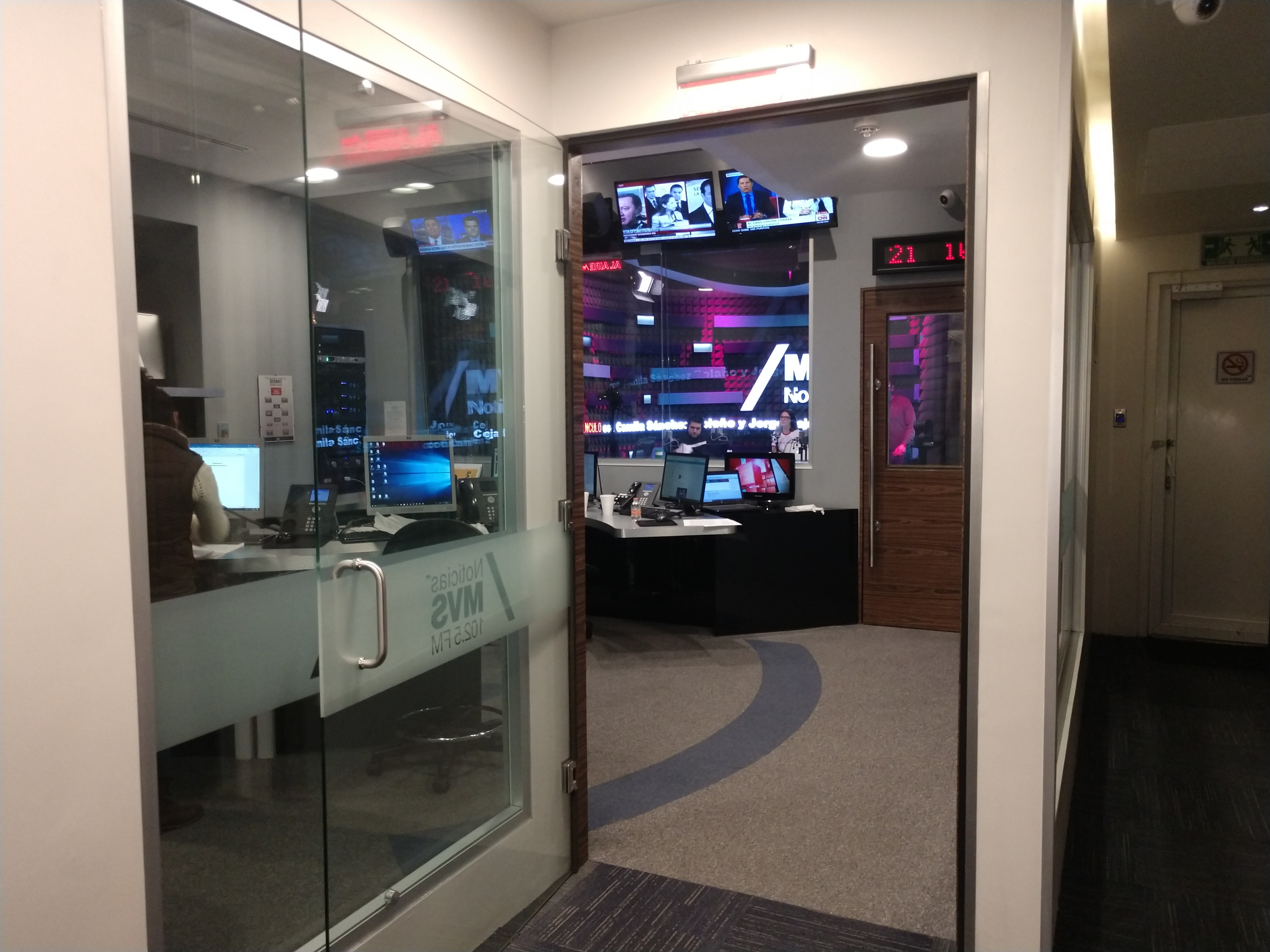
- The MVS Noticias studio in Mexico City
- Mexico City; Mexico
- Frequency: 102.5 MHz
- Branding: MVS Noticias

Programming
- Format: News/talk; contemporary music in English

Ownership
- Owner: MVS Radio; (Stereorey México, S.A.)
- Sister stations: XHEXA-FM, XERC-FM

History
- First air date: August 15, 1967
- Former call signs: XHV-FM (1967-October 8, 1991)
- Call sign meaning: Owner MVS

Technical information
- Licensing authority: CRT
- Class: C
- ERP: 80.1 kW
- HAAT: 468.13 meters (1,535.9 ft)
- Transmitter coordinates: 19°31′56.7″N 99°07′51.7″W

Links
- Webcast: Listen live
- Website: mvsnoticias.com.mx

XHMVS-FM is a radio station in Mexico City. Broadcasting on 102.5 FM from a tower on Cerro del Chiquihuite, XHMVS-FM is owned by MVS Radio and is a news-talk station under the name MVS Noticias. The transmitter site is located atop Cerro del Chiquihuite.

== History ==
In 1964, a concession was awarded to Ruben Marin y Kall for a new radio station on 102.5 FM in Mexico City, under the callsign XHV-FM. The station took to the air on August 15, 1967, and the next year it was sold to Joaquín Vargas Gómez, founder of MVS, who increased its power from 1 to 54 kW. During this time, the station was an English-language music outlet under the name "Stereorey", a name still evident in the name of the concessionaire for almost all of MVS's owned-and-operated radio stations in Mexico. The Stereorey format was available nationwide on a network of stations mostly owned by MVS.

On October 8, 1991, this station, the flagship of the Stereorey network, was renamed XHMVS-FM and its power increased to 80 kW, but the station's first format change since the 1960s would not come until August 5, 2002. At that time, Stereorey gave way nationwide to Best FM, with a newer music mix. On March 15, 2004, this was replaced with the station's first news-based format, MVS 102.5. This station broadcast the newscasts of Grupo Monitor, as Monitor, newly broken off from Radio Centro, and MVS had a partnership at the time. After a two-year stint from December 1, 2006 until November 30, 2008, in which it took on the national MVS "La Mejor" grupera format, XHMVS-FM returned to a news format on January 5, 2009.

== Format ==
MVS Noticias includes a wide range of news and talk programs, as well as contemporary music in English during off-hours, a remnant of its previous Stereorey/Best FM formats.
