= San Juan Bautista Tuxtepec =

- Municipality and city
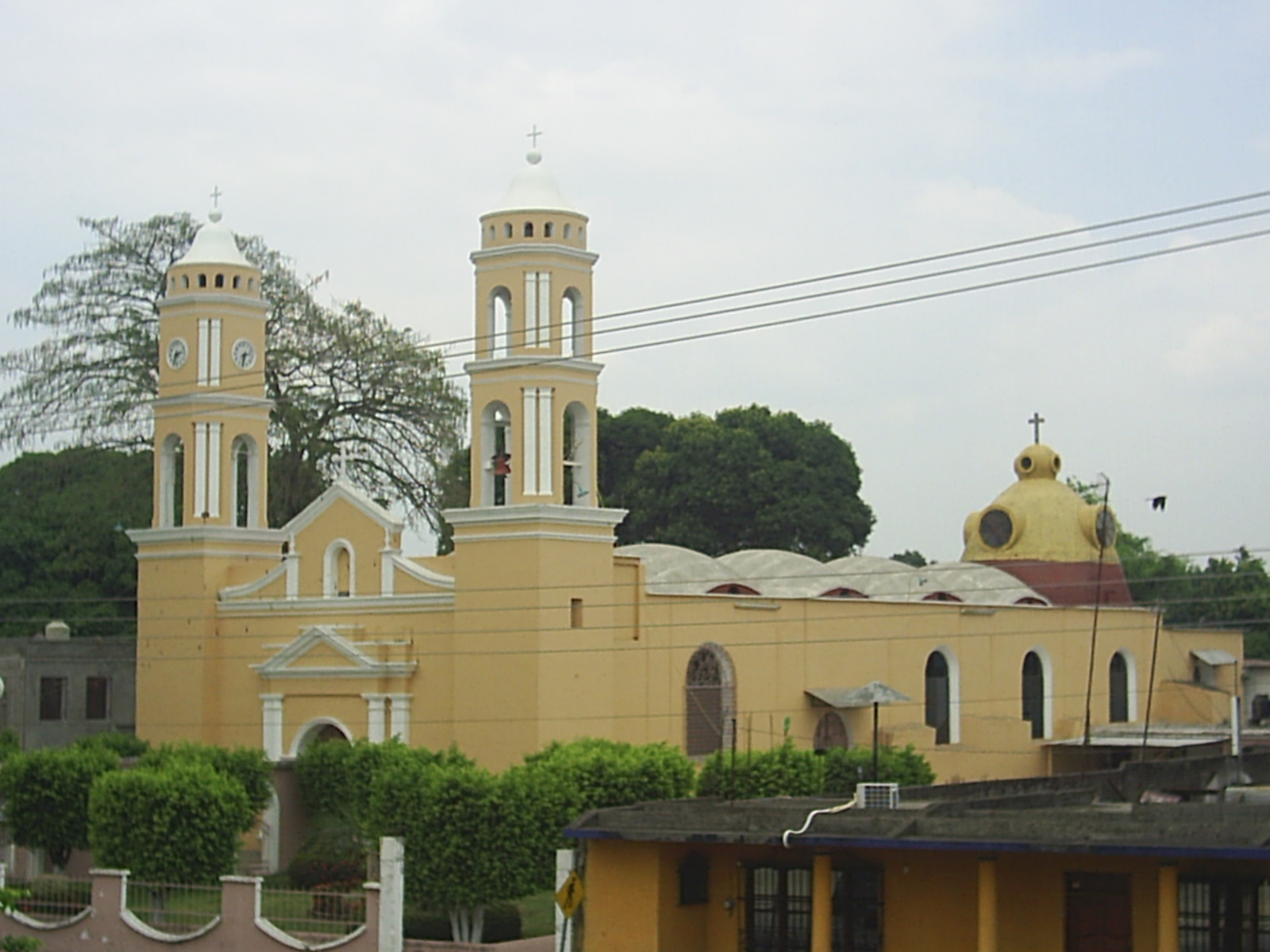
- Former Tuxtepec Cathedral

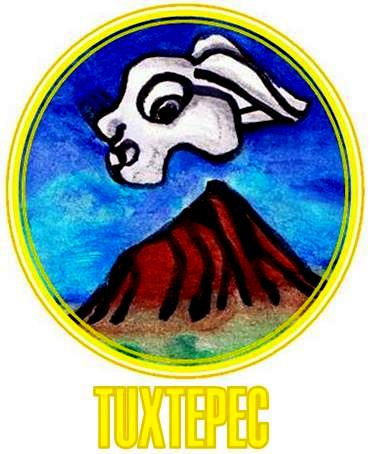
- Coat of arms

- San Juan Bautista Tuxtepec in Oaxaca

- Location within Mexico
- Coordinates: 18°05′13″N 96°07′30″W
- Country: Mexico
- State: Oaxaca
- Municipality: San Juan Bautista Tuxtepec
- Founded: C. 14th (?)
- Municipality created: 1811

Area
  - Total: 877 km^{2} (339 sq mi)
  - Municipal Seat: 41.92 km^{2} (16.19 sq mi)
- Elevation: 20 m (66 ft)

Population (2020 census)
  - Total: 159,452
  - Density: 182/km^{2} (471/sq mi)
  - Municipal Seat: 103,609
  - Municipal Seat density: 2,472/km^{2} (6,401/sq mi)
- Time zone: UTC-6 (Central (US Central))
- Postal code: 68300 (Centro)
- Area code: 287
- Fiestas: 23–24 June
- Website: https://www.tuxtepec.gob.mx/

San Juan Bautista Tuxtepec (Nahuatl languages: Tōchtepēc, "on the hill of rabbits"), or simply referred to as Tuxtepec, is the head of the municipality by the same name and is the second most populous city of the Mexican state of Oaxaca. It is part of the Tuxtepec District of the Papaloapan Region. As of the 2020 census, the city is home to a population of 103,609 and 159,452 in the municipality (0.979% of the state population), though census data are often under reported for various reasons.

== Municipality ==
The city serves as municipal seat of the municipality, having jurisdiction over the following communities:

Adolfina Rangel Arceo, Agua Azul, Agua Escondida, Agua Fría Papaloapan, Agua Fría Piedra del Sol, Amapa, Arroyo Chiquito, Arroyo Cohapa, Arroyo Limón, Arroyo Zuzule, Atilano Cruz, Base Estrella, Benemérito Juárez, Bethania, Buenavista, Buenavista Gallardo, Buenavista Río Tonto, Buenos Aires el Apompo, California, Camalotal, Camarón Salsipuedes, Camelia Roja, Campo Nuevo, Canutillo, Caracol, Cándido Cuevas, Centro de Población Rosario Ibarra de Piedra, Cerro Bola, Claudio Vicente Justo, Colonia la Fe, Colonia Mancilla y Acevedo, Colonia Obrera (Ejido Benito Juárez), Colonia Obrera Benito Juárez, Colonia Ortega, Colonia Víctor Bravo Ahuja (Segunda Etapa), Conjunto Residencial Fapatux, Conjunto Residencial Sebastopol, Curva las Consuegras (Ejido las Ánimas), Desviación Piedra Quemada, Don Juan (San Antonio), Dos Caminos, El Azufre, El Basurero Municipal, El Cañaveral, El Caminante, El Cedral, El Chaparral, El Crucero, El Desengaño, El Encajonado, El Escobillal, El Esfuerzo, El Guayabo (Boca de Coapa), El Jimbal, El Mangal, El Milagro, El Mirador Mata de Caña (Lino Ramírez), El Naranjal, El Ojillal (Boca de Coapa), El Palmar, El Panalito, El Paraíso, El Paraíso Zacatal, El Peal, El Placer, El Porvenir, El Progreso 1, El Progreso 2, El Recreo 1, El Recreo 2, El Recreo 3, El Recuerdo, El Suspiro, El Tonto, El Triunfo, El Yagual, El Zapotal, Esperanza Arroyo la Gloria, Finca el Progreso, Francisco I. Madero (Los Cerritos), Francisco I. Madero de los Cerritos Río Tonto, Frente al Ingenio, Fuente Misteriosa, Fuente Villa, Galera de Soto, General Lázaro Cárdenas, Huerta San Gerardo, Ignacio Zaragoza, Jazmín, Jimaguas, La Aurora y Anexas, La Carlota, La Coconal (Desviación a Agua Fría), La Esmalta, La Esmeralda, La Esperanza, La Esperanza Agua Pescadito, La Huerta, La Hulera, La Mina, La Montaña, La Nueva Revolución, La Pequeña, La Pita (Efrén Garduño), La Pita (El Mexicanito), La Pochota, La Puerta del Recreo, La Redonda (Boca de Coapa), La Reforma, La Trinidad, La Unión, Las Delicias, Las Palmas, Las Palmas (El Nanche), Las Palomas, Lic. Ignacio Martínez Bautista, Los Anzures, Los Ávalos, Los Ávalos, Los Cocos, Los Juanes, Los Mangales (La Estopa), Los Mangos, Los Pinos, Los Reyes (Ampliación Santa Úrsula), Macín Chico, María Domínguez, Mata de Caña, Mixtancillo (Boca de Coapa), Mundo Nuevo, Nuevo Horizonte, Ojo de Agua, Palmilla, Pantoja, Papaloapan, Paso Canoa, Paso de Armadillo, Paso Rincón, Piedra Quemada, Pillo García (Buenavista), Pio V Becerra Ballesteros, Playa del Mono, Pueblo Nuevo Ojo de Agua, Pueblo Nuevo Papaloapan, Puente del Obispo (La Joya), Rancho de San Antonio 1, Rancho de San Antonio 2, Rancho Doña Mimí, Rancho el Águila, Rancho el Sábalo, Rancho Mis Abuelos, Rancho Nuevo Jonotal, Rincón Bonito, Roberto Figueroa, Rodeo Arroyo Pepesca, Sabino Pérez, San Bartolo, San Felipe de la Peña, San Fermín, San Francisco 1, San Francisco 2, San Francisco Salsipuedes, San Isidro las Piñas, San José, San Juan Bautista de Matamoros, San Juan Bautista Tuxtepec, San Lorenzo (El Zapotal), San Martín las Caobas, San Miguel Obispo, San Pedro, San Rafael 1, San Rafael 2, San Román, San Rosendo, San Silverio el Cedral, Santa Úrsula, Santa Catarina, Santa Elena, Santa Isabel Río Obispo, Santa María Amapa, Santa María Obispo, Santa Rosa Papaloapan, Santa Silvia, Santa Teresa (Boca de Coapa), Santa Teresa Papaloapan, Santo Tomás, Sebastopol, Silvano Reyes, Silverio la Arrocera, Soledad Macín Chico, Tacoteno el Consuelo, Tecoteno el Tular, Toro Bravo, Vista Hermosa, and Zacate Colorado

Together, the municipality covers an area of 933.9 km^{2} (360.58 sq mi) and reported a census population of 144,555, which includes many small outlying communities.

== History ==
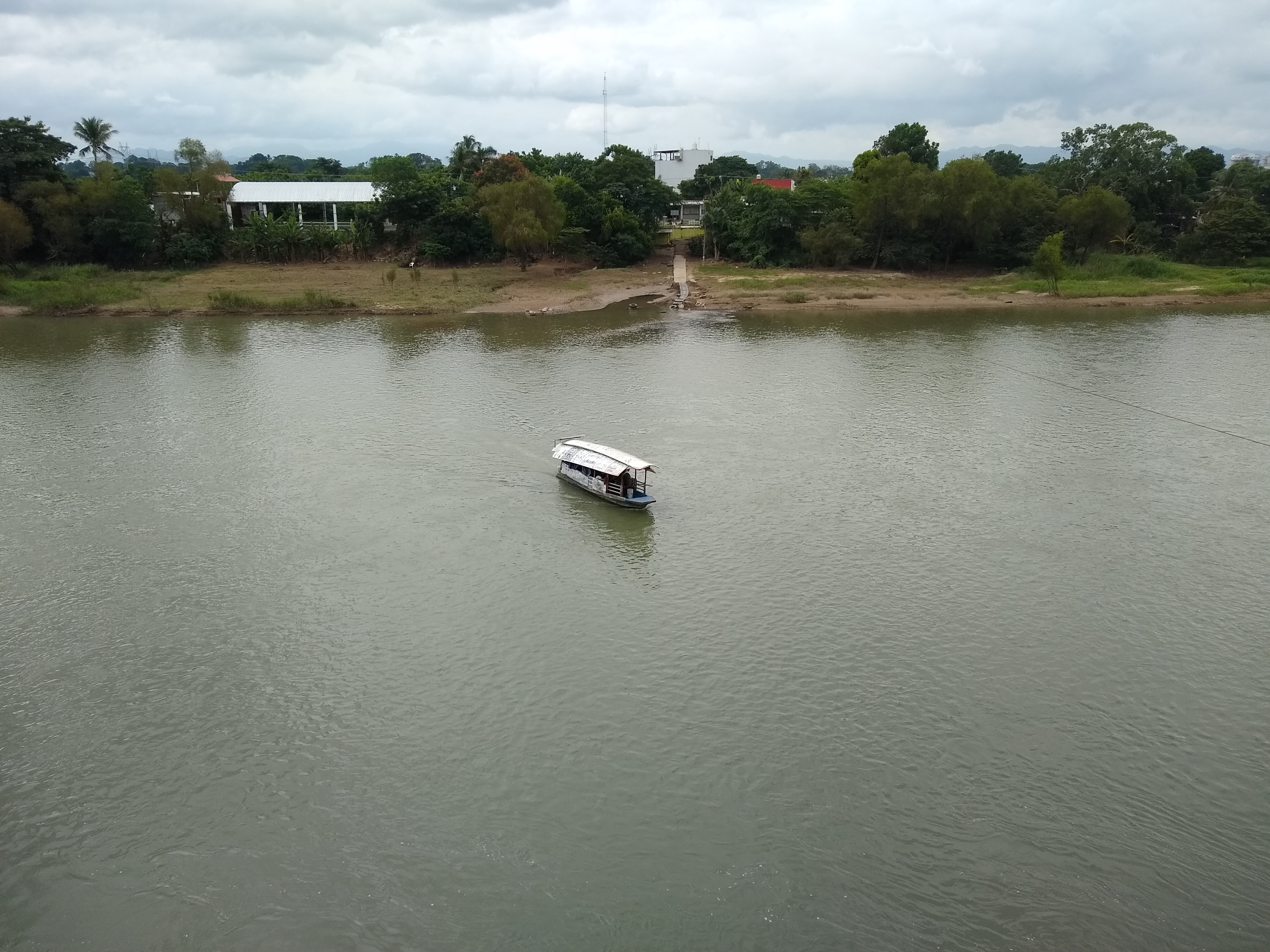
San Juan Bautista Tuxtepec- passenger ferry on the Papaloapan River

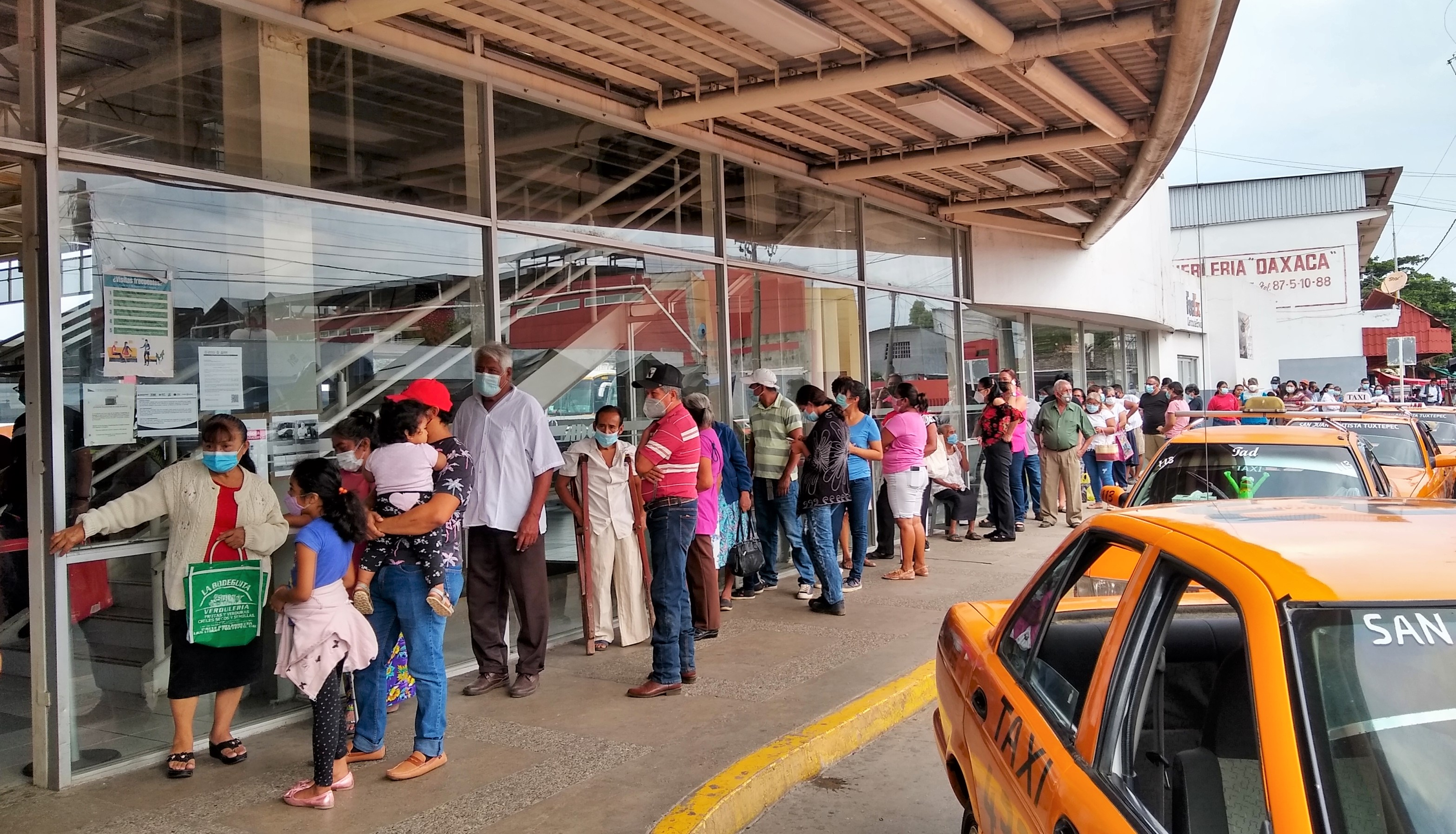
COVID vaccination line at the town's bus station in 2021

Tuxtepec, or Tochtepec, was a prehispanic settlement. It was likely originally inhabited by the Popoluca ethnicity speaking a Mixean language, though by the time of the Spanish conquest, a dialect of Nahuatl (sometimes referred to as 'Olmec') was the main language of the region. Tochtepec was situated upon an important trade route along the Papaloapan River to the Gulf of Mexico, and it was a major trade center that attracted Aztec pochteca, who used it as a base for their regional operations and eventually permanently settled here along with a class of bureaucrats who served to reinforce their activities.

Tochtepec was conquered either by Nezahualcoyotl or Moctezuma I and incorporated into the Aztec Empire as a tributary province. The first tribute offered by the province to Nezahualcoyotl consisted of fine clothing, cacao, rubber, cochineal, feathers, warrior costumes, and servants for the Acolhua palaces. The tribute demands were later modified to clothing, warrior costumes, gold ornaments, greenstone jewelry, lip plugs of amber and crystal, tropical feathers, rubber, liquidambar, and cacao. The Aztecs installed a military garrison, a Mexica governor, and a tribute collector (the first being named Toyectzin) here. Tochtepec was also a center for the Aztec judicial system, handling important regional cases.

Municipal President Fernando Bautista Dávila died in 2020 during the COVID-19 pandemic in Mexico.

== Geography ==
The municipality resides in the region called La Cuenca (Spanish for "The Basin"), is located 36 feet above sea level, and occupies an area of approximately 580 square miles (1,500 km^{2}). The city itself is surrounded by the Papaloapan River, and lies a few kilometers south of the Cerro de Oro Dam on its tributary the Santo Domingo River. The municipality is bordered by the state of Veracruz in the north, the municipalities of Loma Bonita to the east and San José Chiltepec to the south. It is almost 100 miles (160 km) to the port of Veracruz, 130 miles (210 km) to Oaxaca City, the state capital, and 310 miles (500 km) to Mexico City.

=== Climate ===
Climate data for San Juan Bautista Tuxtepec
Month	Jan	Feb	Mar	Apr	May	Jun	Jul	Aug	Sep	Oct	Nov	Dec	Year
Mean daily maximum °C (°F)	27.7 (81.9)	29.0 (84.2)	32.0 (89.6)	35.2 (95.4)	36.0 (96.8)	34.5 (94.1)	32.9 (91.2)	33.1 (91.6)	32.6 (90.7)	30.9 (87.6)	29.5 (85.1)	28.0 (82.4)	31.8 (89.2)
Mean daily minimum °C (°F)	17.6 (63.7)	17.6 (63.7)	19.7 (67.5)	22.0 (71.6)	23.2 (73.8)	23.5 (74.3)	22.8 (73.0)	22.7 (72.9)	22.8 (73.0)	21.6 (70.9)	19.9 (67.8)	18.2 (64.8)	21.0 (69.7)
Average precipitation mm (inches)	32.2 (1.27)	34.2 (1.35)	29.8 (1.17)	31.9 (1.26)	57.4 (2.26)	372.2 (14.65)	470.0 (18.50)	395.4 (15.57)	463.2 (18.24)	206.9 (8.15)	69.5 (2.74)	48.4 (1.91)	2,211.1 (87.07)
Average precipitation days	4.5	5.4	4.9	3.0	4.6	14.6	19.1	17.6	17.0	11.8	6.4	5.0	113.9
Source: Servicio Meteorológico Nacional

== Twinned towns ==
- Tierra Blanca, Mexico
- Tlacotalpan, Mexico

== See also ==
- Plan de Tuxtepec, proclaimed on 10 January 1876
