= List of radio stations in Sinaloa =

This is a list of CRT-licensed radio stations in the Mexican state of Sinaloa, which can be sorted by their call signs, frequencies, location, ownership, names, and programming formats.

Radio stations in Sinaloa
Call sign	Frequency	Location	Owner	Name	Format
XEHS-AM (Note: Bound to XHHS-FM 90.9, which must keep XEHS-AM on the air until there are no otherwise unserved communities in its coverage area.)	540 AM	Los Mochis	Radiodifusora XEHS, S.A. de C.V.	La Mejor	Regional Mexican
XEHW-AM (Note: Bound to XHHW-FM 102.7, which must keep XEHW-AM on the air until there are no otherwise unserved communities in its coverage area.)	600 AM	Chametla	Manuel Francisco Pérez Muñoz	La Mejor	Regional Mexican
XEGS-AM (Note: Bound to XHGS-FM 104.7, which must keep XEGS-AM on the air until there are no otherwise unserved communities in its coverage area.)	610 AM	Guasave	Radiodifusores por Tradición, S.A. de C.V.	La GS	Full-service
XEUAS-AM	1150 AM	Culiacán	Universidad Autónoma de Sinaloa	Radio Universidad Autónoma de Sinaloa	University
XECSEP-AM	1230 AM	Culiacán	Escápate al Paraíso, S.A. de C.V.	—N/a	—N/a
XEACE-AM (Note: Combo with XHACE-FM 91.3)	1470 AM	Mazatlán	Transmisora Regional Radio Fórmula, S.A. de C.V.	Radio Fórmula	News/talk
XHCSEB-FM	88.1 FM	Adolfo López Mateos	Radio Agricultores del Valle de Sinaloa, A.C.	NRGY	—N/a
XHSIG-FM	88.5 FM	Los Mochis	Sinaloa Arte y Gloria, A.C.	La Interesante de Los Mochis	Variety
XHEX-FM	88.7 FM	Culiacán	Transmisora Regional Radio Fórmula, S.A. de C.V.	Radio Fórmula	News/talk
XHPGVS-FM	88.9 FM	Guasave	GPM Grupo Promomedios Mazatlán, S.A. de C.V.	Ke Buena	Regional Mexican
XHFIL-FM	88.9 FM	Mazatlán	Radio XEFIL, S.A. de C.V.	Magia Digital	Regional Mexican
XHCPCQ-FM	89.1 FM	Culiacán	Instituto Mexicano de la Radio	—N/a	—N/a
XHUDO-FM	89.3 FM	Los Mochis	Universidad Autónoma de Occidente	Radio UAdeO	University
XHCSI-FM	89.5 FM	Culiacán	XECSI-AM, S.A. de C.V.	Romántica	Romantic
XHCCCF-FM	89.7 FM	Guasave	Red Empresarial Total, S.A. de C.V.	Vibra Radio	Regional Mexican
XHOPE-FM	89.7 FM	Mazatlán	Radio OPE de Mazatlán, S.A. de C.V.	Exa FM	Contemporary hit radio
XHUPES-FM	89.9 FM	Culiacán Rosales	Universidad Pedagógica del Estado de Sinaloa	Radio UPES	University
XHLCE-FM	90.1 FM	La Cruz de Elota	Radio Agricultores del Valle de Sinaloa, A.C.	Óscar FM	Adult hits
XHMIL-FM	90.1 FM	Los Mochis	Radio Mil Sinaloense, S.A. de C.V.	Ke Buena	Regional Mexican
XHFCS-FM	90.3 FM	Culiacán	Fundación Cultural para la Sociedad Mexicana, A.C.	Radio María	Catholic
XHAVE-FM	90.5 FM	Guasave	Fundación Cultural para la Sociedad Mexicana, A.C.	Radio María	Catholic
XHMZL-FM (Note: Operating on an expired concession.)	90.5 FM	Mazatlán	Instituto Cultural de Occidente, A.C.	Radio Cultura	Cultural
XHCCCC-FM	90.7 FM	Culiacán	Radio Informativa, S.A. de C.V.	La Lupe	Adult hits
XHHS-FM	90.9 FM	Los Mochis	Radiodifusora XEHS, S.A. de C.V.	La Mejor	Regional Mexican
XHPGSS-FM	91.3 FM	Guasave	Centrado Corporativo, S.A. de C.V.	—N/a	—N/a
XHACE-FM	91.3 FM	Mazatlán	Transmisora Regional Radio Fórmula, S.A. de C.V.	Radio Fórmula	News/talk
XHTLAN-FM	91.7 FM	Mazatlán	Fomento Educativo y Cultural Francisco de Ibarra, A.C.	Lobos FM	University
XHECU-FM	91.7 FM	Los Mochis	Radio y Televisión de Sinaloa, S.A. de C.V.	La Rancherita	Regional Mexican
XHBL-FM	91.9 FM	Culiacán	Amplitud Modulada 710, S.A.	Ke Buena	Regional Mexican
XHGML-FM	92.1 FM	Guamuchil	La Regional del Évora, S.A. de C.V.	La Maxi	Regional Mexican
XHPMAZ-FM	92.1 FM	Mazatlán	Radio Informativa, S.A. de C.V.	La Lupe	Adult hits
XHCCCB-FM	92.3 FM	Culiacán Rosales	Lola FM, S.A. de C.V.	La Mexicana	Regional Mexican
XHLMS-FM	92.5 FM	Los Mochis	Gobierno del Estado de Sinaloa	Radio Sinaloa	Public radio
XHMZT-FM	93.1 FM	Mazatlán	Grupo Nueva Radio, S.A. de C.V.	Radio Disney	Contemporary hit radio
XHCF-FM	93.3 FM	Los Mochis	XECF Radio Impactos 14-10, S.A.	La Mexicana	Regional Mexican
XHCCCE-FM	93.5 FM	La Cruz	APGR Comunicaciones, S.A. de C.V.	—N/a	—N/a
XHCUAD-FM	93.7 FM	Culiacán	Fomento Educativo y Cultural Francisco de Ibarra, A.C.	Lobos FM	University
XHEORO-FM	93.7 FM	Guasave	Grupo RSN de Guasave, S.A. de C.V.	La Mera Jefa	Regional Mexican
XHMZS-FM	93.9 FM	Mazatlán	Gobierno del Estado de Sinaloa	Radio Sinaloa	Public radio
XHPNAS-FM	94.1 FM	Navolato	Energía Radial en Comunicación, S.A. de C.V.	Stereo Uno	Contemporary hit radio
XHQE-FM	94.3 FM	Escuinapa	Sucn. de Francisco Millán Ramos	La Kañona	Regional Mexican
XHGES-FM	94.5 FM	Culiacán	Gobierno del Estado de Sinaloa	Radio Sinaloa	Public radio
XHGVE-FM	94.5 FM	Guasave	Sinaloa Arte y Gloria, A.C.	La Interesante de Guasave	Variety
XHCCCI-FM	95.1 FM	Guamúchil	Red Empresarial Total, S.A. de C.V.	Vibra Radio	Regional Mexican
XHIN-FM	95.3 FM	Culiacán	XHIN-FM, S.A. de C.V.	La Plakosa–Arroba FM	Regional Mexican
XHPFRT-FM	95.3 FM	El Fuerte	Energía Radial en Comunicación, S.A. de C.V.	La Morrita	Regional Mexican
XHMFS-FM	95.7 FM	Mochicahui	Universidad Autónoma Intercultural de Sinaloa	Radio UAIS	University
XHUAS-FM	96.1 FM	Culiacán	Universidad Autónoma de Sinaloa	Radio Universidad Autónoma de Sinaloa	University
XHCCCA-FM	96.1 FM	Los Mochis	Carlos Alberto Quintero Núñez	La Morrita	Regional Mexican
XHCW-FM	96.5 FM	Los Mochis	Radio y Televisión de Sinaloa, S.A. de C.V.	La Z	Regional Mexican
XHVQ-FM	96.9 FM	Culiacán	Radio XHVQ, S. de R.L. de C.V.	Vibra Radio	Regional Mexican
XHVU-FM	97.1 FM	Mazatlán	Radio XEVU, S.A. de C.V.	La Morrita	Regional Mexican
XHHIS-FM	97.3 FM	Los Mochis	Fomento Educativo y Cultural Francisco de Ibarra, A.C.	Lobos FM	University
XHCCCG-FM	97.5 FM	Mazatlán	Irratia, S.A.P.I. de C.V.	Contemporary hit radio	Contemporary hit radio
XHMMS-FM	97.9 FM	Mazatlán	Radio Mil de Mazatlán, S.A. de C.V.	Globo	Romantic
XHGSE-FM	98.1 FM	Guasave	Grupo RSN de Guasave, S.A. de C.V.	Exa FM	Contemporary hit radio
XHCLI-FM	98.5 FM	Culiacán	Radio Alar, S.A. de C.V.	La Comadre	Regional Mexican
XHCCCD-FM	98.5 FM	El Fuerte	APGR Comunicaciones, S.A. de C.V.	La Ke Buena	Regional Mexican
XHVOX-FM	98.7 FM	Mazatlán	Radio Cañón, S.A. de C.V.	Los 40	Contemporary hit radio
XHMPM-FM	98.9 FM	Los Mochis	Radio Topolobampo, S.A. de C.V.	Exa FM	Contemporary hit radio
XHJL-FM	99.3 FM	Guamuchil	Guasigua Radio, S.A. de C.V.	La JL	Full-service
XHMAT-FM	99.5 FM	Mazatlán	Radio XHMAT, S. de R.L. de C.V.	Vibra Radio	Regional Mexican
XHCNA-FM	100.1 FM	Culiacán	Radio XHCNA Culiacán, S. de R.L. de C.V.	Match FM	Contemporary hit radio
XHZS-FM	100.3 FM	Mazatlán	Radio XHZS-FM, S.A. de C.V.	Stereo Uno	Contemporary hit radio
XHTNT-FM	100.5 FM	Los Mochis	Radio 65, S.A.	Radio 65	News/talk
XHMSL-FM	101.3 FM	Los Mochis	Radiodifusora XHMSL-FM, S.A. de C.V.	Stereo Uno	Contemporary hit radio
XHCCCH-FM	101.5 FM	Mazatlán	Irratia, S.A.P.I. de C.V.	—N/a	—N/a
XHESA-FM	101.7 FM	Culiacán	Radiosistema de Culiacán, S.A. de C.V.	Exa FM	Contemporary hit radio
XHWS-FM	102.5 FM	Culiacán	XHWS, S.A. de C.V.	La Bestia Grupera	Regional Mexican
XHMAX-FM	102.5 FM	Los Mochis	Roque de Jesús Chávez López	La Maxi	Regional Mexican
XHHW-FM	102.7 FM	Chametla	Manuel Francisco Pérez Muñoz	La Mejor	Regional Mexican
XHMSA-FM	102.9 FM	Los Mochis	Universidad Autónoma de Sinaloa	Radio Universidad Autónoma de Sinaloa	University
XHNW-FM	103.3 FM	Culiacán	Mega Frecuencia, S.A. de C.V.	Maxiradio	
XHPNK-FM (Note: Operating on an expired concession.)	103.5 FM	Los Mochis	Radio y Televisión de Sinaloa, S.A. de C.V.	Radio Variedades	
XHSPRM-FM	103.5 FM	Mazatlán	Sistema Público de Radiodifusión del Estado Mexicano	Altavoz Radio	Public radio
XHCCBZ-FM	103.9 FM	Ahome	APGR Comunicaciones, S.A. de C.V.	—N/a	—N/a
XHECQ-FM	104.1 FM	Culiacán	Radio CQ de Culiacán, S.A. de C.V.	La Nueva	Regional Mexican
XHENX-FM	104.3 FM	Mazatlán	Radio Cañón, S.A. de C.V.	Radio Cañon	Regional Mexican
XHREV-FM	104.3 FM	Los Mochis	Red Empresarial Total, S.A. de C.V.	Vibra Radio	Regional Mexican
XHGS-FM	104.7 FM	Guasave	Radiodifusores por Tradición, S.A. de C.V.	La GS	Full-service
XHCUL-FM	104.9 FM	Culiacán	Fundación Radiodifusoras Capital Jalisco, A.C.	La Bella	Variety/women
XHERJ-FM	105.1 FM	Mazatlán	Radio RJ de Mazatlán, S.A. de C.V.	La Nueva RJ	Regional Mexican

== Defunct ==
- XHENZ-FM 92.9, Culiacán
- XHWT-FM 97.7, Culiacán
- XHEMOS-FM 94.1, Los Mochis
- XHST-FM 94.7, Mazatlán
