= 93.7 FM =

FM radio frequency

The following radio stations broadcast on FM frequency 93.7 MHz:

== Argentina ==
- Cordial in Rosario, Santa Fe
- Radio María in 9 de Julio, Buenos Aires
- Radio María in Saladillo, Buenos Aires
- Radio María in Marcos Juárez, Córdoba
- LRP785 Sol in Romang, Santa Fe

== Australia ==
- Edge FM in Bega, New South Wales
- 2LND in Sydney, New South Wales
- Radio National in Lightning Ridge, New South Wales
- Radio TAB in Toowoomba, Queensland
- 5DDD in Adelaide, South Australia
- Ace Radio in Portland, Victoria
- 3SUN in Mount Buller, Victoria
- 6PER in Perth, Western Australia
- Vision Radio Network in Albany, Western Australia

== Brazil ==
- ZYD 661 in Porto Alegre, Rio Grande do Sul
- ZYD 711 in Florianópolis, Santa Catarina

== Belize ==
- My Refuge Christian Radio at Roaring Creek.

== Canada (Channel 229) ==
- CBDJ-FM in Hay River, Northwest Territories
- CBJ-FM in Chicoutimi, Quebec
- CBMI-FM in Baie-Comeau, Quebec
- CBNH-FM in St. Andrew's, Newfoundland and Labrador
- CBNL-FM in Clarenville, Newfoundland and Labrador
- CBON-FM-1 in Kirkland Lake, Ontario
- CBON-FM-22 in Geraldton, Ontario
- CBTP-FM in Penticton, British Columbia
- CBUF-FM-7 in Dawson Creek, British Columbia
- CBV-FM-5 in St-Fabien-de-Panet, Quebec
- CBWO-FM in Nelson House, Manitoba
- CBYU-FM in Alexis Creek, British Columbia
- CFGE-FM in Sherbrooke, Quebec
- CFJW-FM in Chapleau, Ontario
- CHEC-FM in Mistawawsis First Nation, Saskatchewan
- CHYX-FM in Kapuskasing, Ontario
- CJJR-FM in Vancouver, British Columbia
- CJLT-FM in Medicine Hat, Alberta
- CJNU-FM in Winnipeg, Manitoba
- CJTW-FM in Kitchener, Ontario
- CKMA-FM in Miramichi, New Brunswick
- CKOL-FM in Campbellford, Ontario
- CKSB-3-FM in The Pas, Manitoba
- CKUA-FM-1 in Calgary, Alberta
- CKWY-FM in Wainwright, Alberta
- CKYC-FM in Owen Sound, Ontario
- VF2581 in Havre St-Pierre, Quebec

== China ==
- CNR Business Radio in Yunfu

== Greece ==
- Gnomi FM in Thessaloniki
- Ionian- Rythmos in Parta
- Tamiami Galinki Faniki Radiofonia Samou in Samos

== Israel ==
- Radio Makan in Jerusalem, the Judea and Samaria Area and Nazareth

== Japan ==
- CBC Radio in Nagoya, Aichi
- MBC Radio in Akune, Kagoshima

== Malaysia ==
- IKIMfm in Kuching, Sarawak

== Mexico ==
- XEJP-FM in Mexico City
- XHAGT-FM in Aguascalientes, Aguascalientes
- XHAX-FM in Oaxaca, Oaxaca
- XHCUAD-FM in Culiacán, Sinaloa
- XHDIS-FM in Ciudad Delicias, Chihuahua
- XHENI-FM in Tejerías, Michoacán
- XHEORO-FM in Guasave, Sinaloa
- XHGAL-FM in Galeana, Nuevo León
- XHKL-FM in Xalapa, Veracruz
- XHLEN-FM in Palenque, Chiapas
- XHMRI-FM in Mérida, Yucatán
- XHNVS-FM in Navojoa, Sonora
- XHPA-FM in Acapulco, Guerrero
- XHTEY-FM in Tepic, Nayarit
- XHTLAC-FM in Tlacotalpan, Veracruz
- XHZQ-FM in Cunduacán, Tabasco
- XHZZZ-FM in Manzanillo, Colima

== Nigeria ==
- Rhythm 93.7 FM Port Harcourt
- Rhythm 93.7 FM Lagos

== Philippines ==
- DYMD-FM in Dumaguete City
- DXFD-FM in Cotabato City
- DXIZ in Maramag, Bukidnon

== United Kingdom ==
- Island FM in Alderney, Guernsey

== United States (Channel 229) ==
- KAFC in Anchorage, Alaska
- KAIR in Horton, Kansas
- KAZY in Cheyenne, Wyoming
- KBEP-LP in Bismarck, North Dakota
- KBRK in Brookings, South Dakota
- KCLB in Coachella, California
- KCZP-LP in San Diego, California
- KDB in Santa Barbara, California
- KDKA in Pittsburgh, Pennsylvania
- KDRK in Spokane, Washington
- KHBM-FM in Monticello, Arkansas
- KISR in Fort Smith, Arkansas
- KIZZ in Minot, North Dakota
- KJBR in Marked Tree, Arkansas
- KJZY in Sebastopol, California
- KKDL (FM) in Dilley, Texas
- KKRL in Carroll, Iowa
- KKUT in Mount Pleasant, Utah
- KLBB-FM in Lubbock, Texas
- KLBJ in Austin, Texas
- KLKO in Elko, Nevada
- KLSY in Montesano, Washington
- KNOR in Krum, Texas
- KNTK in Firth, Nebraska
- KOBB-FM in Bozeman, Montana
- KOYY in Fargo, North Dakota
- KPGF in Sun Valley, Nevada
- KPIO-FM in Pleasanton, Kansas
- KQBT in Houston, Texas
- KQFM in Hermiston, Oregon
- KRAI-FM in Craig, Colorado
- KRLZ in Waldport, Oregon
- KRMK in Las Vegas, New Mexico
- KRQQ in Tucson, Arizona
- KSBV in Salida, Colorado
- KSD in Saint Louis, Missouri
- KSKS in Fresno, California
- KSPI-FM in Stillwater, Oklahoma
- KTMT in Medford, Oregon
- KTRJ-LP in Winthrop, Washington
- KTUF in Kirksville, Missouri
- KURT in Prineville, Oregon
- KVAR (FM) in Pine Ridge, South Dakota
- KWXW in Kermit, Texas
- KWYR in Winner, South Dakota
- KXFS in Rankin, Texas
- KXKS in Shreveport, Louisiana
- KXWX in Mohave Valley, Arizona
- KXXI in Gallup, New Mexico
- KXXR in Minneapolis, Minnesota
- KXZM in Felton, California
- KYEZ in Salina, Kansas
- KYFJ in New Iberia, Louisiana
- KYOD-LP in Odessa, Texas
- KYRV in Roseville, California
- KYTI in Sheridan, Wyoming
- KZFX in Ridgecrest, California
- KZYY-LP in Tyler, Texas
- WAAO-FM in Andalusia, Alabama
- WAZR in Woodstock, Virginia
- WBCT in Grand Rapids, Michigan
- WBFM in Sheboygan, Wisconsin
- WBGR-FM in Monroe, Wisconsin
- WBLK in Depew, New York
- WBQE in Milbridge, Maine
- WBQO in Darien, Georgia
- WBXE in Baxter, Tennessee
- WCFC-LP in Richmond, Virginia
- WCIP in Clyde, New York
- WCYE in Three Lakes, Wisconsin
- WDGG in Ashland, Kentucky
- WDJC in Birmingham, Alabama
- WEEI in Lawrence, Massachusetts
- WEHP in Clinton, Indiana
- WFBC in Greenville, South Carolina
- WFCJ in Miamisburg, Ohio
- WFFI in Kingston Springs, Tennessee
- WFRR in Walton, Indiana
- WGHF-LP in Superior, Wisconsin
- WGYL in Vero Beach, Florida
- WHEL in Naples, Florida
- WIFY in Addison, Vermont
- WKAD in Harrietta, Michigan
- WKEY-FM in Key West, Florida
- WKHF in Lynchburg, Virginia
- WMAA-LP in Moca, Puerto Rico
- WMJY in Biloxi, Mississippi
- WNKQ-LP in Kissimmee, Florida
- WNOB in Chesapeake, Virginia
- WNTB in Topsail Beach, North Carolina
- WOCS-LP in Orangeburg, South Carolina
- WOEZ in Walterboro, South Carolina
- WOGK in Ocala, Florida
- WOTX in Lunenburg, Vermont
- WOWA in West Salem, Illinois
- WPEZ in Jeffersonville, Georgia
- WPOK in Pontiac, Illinois
- WQGR in North Madison, Ohio
- WQIO in Mount Vernon, Ohio
- WQPU-LP in Westbrookville, New York
- WRCL in Frankenmuth, Michigan
- WRGG-LP in Greencastle, Pennsylvania
- WRVG-LP in Georgetown, Kentucky
- WRWT-LP in Syracuse, Indiana
- WSAV-LP in Lorain, Ohio
- WSEU-LP in Lakeland, Florida
- WSIM in Lamar, South Carolina
- WSJR in Dallas, Pennsylvania
- WSTW in Wilmington, Delaware
- WSVJ-LP in Titusville, Florida
- WTKB-FM in Atwood, Tennessee
- WTNM in Courtland, Mississippi
- WXNO-LP in New Orleans, Louisiana
- WYAH-LP in Winchester, Kentucky
- WYAI in Scotia, New York
- WYAY (FM) in Georgetown, South Carolina
- WZMX in Hartford, Connecticut
- WZNT in San Juan, Puerto Rico
- WZWW in Boalsburg, Pennsylvania

== Vietnam ==
- Haiphong FM 93.7 MHz in Haiphong, Vietnam
