= Universidad Autónoma =

Universidad Autónoma may refer to:

== Columbia ==
- Universidad Autónoma Latinoamericana

== Dominican Republic ==
- Universidad Autónoma de Santo Domingo

== El Salvador ==
- Universidad Autónoma de Santa Ana

== Mexico ==
- Universidad Autónoma Agraria Antonio Narro
- Universidad Autónoma de Ciudad Juárez
- Universidad Autónoma de la Ciudad de México
- Universidad Autónoma de Durango
- Universidad Autónoma del Estado de Hidalgo
- Universidad Autónoma del Estado de Morelos
- Universidad Autónoma de Guadalajara
- Universidad Autónoma Intercultural de Sinaloa
- Universidad Autónoma de La Laguna
- Universidad Autónoma Metropolitana
- Universidad Autónoma de Occidente
- Universidad Autónoma de Occidente (Mexico)
- Universidad Autónoma de San Luis Potosí
- Universidad Autónoma de Yucatán
- Universidad Autónoma de Zacatecas
  - Universidad Autónoma de Zacatecas FC

== Panama ==
- Universidad Autónoma de Chiriquí

== Paraguay ==
- Universidad Autónoma de Asunción (university)
  - Universidad Autónoma de Asunción (football)
  - Universidad Autónoma de Asunción (fútsal)

== See also ==
- Universitat Autònoma de Barcelona, Spain
