= XHENZ-FM =

Radio station in Culiacán, Sinaloa, Mexico

Defunct
- Culiacán, Sinaloa; Mexico
- Frequency: 92.9 MHz

Ownership
- Owner: Radio TV México; (Amplitud Modulada 570, S.A.)
- Sister stations: XHBL-FM, XHWT-FM

History
- First air date: April 10, 1958 (concession)
- Last air date: June 30, 2025

Technical information
- ERP: 25 kW
- Transmitter coordinates: 24°48′23″N 107°19′42″W

XHENZ-FM was a radio station on 92.9 FM in Culiacán, Sinaloa. The station last aired the Los 40 Principales national format from Radiópolis.

== History ==
XENZ-AM 570 received its concession on April 10, 1958. It was owned by Radio Impulsora de Culiacán, S.A., broadcasting with 1,000 watts during the day and 250 at night. It was acquired by the current concessionaire in 1984. The 1990s saw XENZ being moved to 890 kHz with 10,000 watts during the day.

XENZ migrated to FM in 2010 as XHENZ-FM 92.9. In December 2016, XHENZ and its sister station XHWS-FM 102.5 were separated from Grupo Radiorama and flipped to MegaRadio formats, marking MegaRadio's second expansion in the state of Sinaloa in just months after it had previously entered Mazatlán. As a result, XHENZ changed from La Sinaloense to Magia Digital keeping its original Regional Mexican format. XHENZ then broke from XHWS and became Los 40 Principales in June 2017.

The concession for XHENZ expired on an unknown date and the station ceased broadcasting on June 30, 2025. It was also the first time for a radio station in the state of Sinaloa to be taken off the air, the other is XHEMOS-FM 94.1 in Los Mochis.
