= XHGML-FM =

Radio station in Guamúchil, Sinaloa, Mexico

- Guamúchil, Sinaloa; Mexico
- Frequency: 92.1 MHz
- Branding: La Maxi

Programming
- Format: Regional Mexican

Ownership
- Owner: Grupo Chávez Radio; (La Regional del Évora, S.A. de C.V.)
- Sister stations: XHJL-FM

History
- First air date: October 15, 1990 (concession)
- Call sign meaning: Guamúchil

Technical information
- Licensing authority: CRT
- Class: A
- ERP: 3 kW
- HAAT: −20.6 m (−68 ft)

Links
- Webcast: Listen live
- Website: grupochavezradio.com

XHGML-FM is a radio station on 92.1 FM in Guamúchil, Sinaloa. It is owned by Grupo Chávez Radio and carries a Regional Mexican format known as La Maxi.

== History ==
XHGML-FM received its concession on October 15, 1990. It was owned by Rutilio Blancarte Díaz and the name of the station was "La Primerísima de Guamúchil", carrying a Spanish adult hits format. In 2006, the station was sold to Grupo Chávez Radio to change to a Regional Mexican format known as "MaxiRadio". The station joined the Los 40 Principales franchise in early 2012, but in mid-2014, the station was changed to Ke Buena.

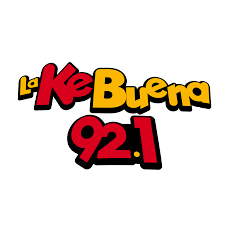
XHGML as Ke Buena to June 2021

In June 2021, Grupo Chávez leased XHREV-FM in Los Mochis and XHGML to Roque Mascareño Chávez—grandson of the founder of Chávez Radio—for his Vibra Radio venture, which had also purchased XHVQ-FM in Culiacán and XHMAT-FM in Mazatlán.

On September 24, 2022, after Vibra Radio won a new station (XHCCCI-FM 95.1) in the IFT-8 radio station auction, XHGML changed to the La Maxi format, based on XHMAX-FM 102.5 in Los Mochis.
