= XHUAD-TDT =

TV station in Durango, Durango, Mexico

- Durango, Durango, Mexico; Mexico
- Channels: Digital: 46 (UHF); Virtual: 4
- Branding: TV Lobo

Programming
- Affiliations: Independent educational

Ownership
- Owner: Universidad Autónoma de Durango; (Fomento Educativo y Cultural Francisco de Ibarra, A.C.)

History
- First air date: March 13, 2012
- Former channel numbers: 46 (digital virtual, until 2016)
- Call sign meaning: Universidad Autónoma de Durango

Technical information
- Licensing authority: CRT
- ERP: 4 kW
- Transmitter coordinates: 24.051799°N 104.627823°W

Links
- Website: www.tvlobo.com

XHUAD-TDT channel 46 is an educational television station founded in 2012 by the Universidad Autónoma de Durango, broadcasting in Durango, Durango, Mexico. Branded as TV Lobo, the station carries a variety of local interest and university programs. It is a sister station to XHUAD-FM 94.1.

== History ==
The history of TV Lobo predates channel 46, with the station starting on Durango cable channel 7 in the 2000s. In 2011, UAD received a permit from Cofetel for a broadcast television station on channel 46, which would carry the same programs as seen on cable. The station signed on March 13, 2012, making it the second university station in Durango behind XHUNES-TV from the Universidad España; a third, XHUJED-TDT, owned by the Universidad Juárez del Estado de Durango, took to the air in 2014.

TV Lobo was one of the few noncommercial broadcasters not owned by a state or federal government to reach an agreement with América Móvil to cover the 2014 Winter Olympics.

In 2015, XHUAD began digital transmissions overnight on channel 46. It went digital-only on December 22, 2015.

In March 2018, in order to facilitate the repacking of TV services out of the 600 MHz band (channels 38-51), XHUAD was assigned channel 22 for continued digital operations.
