= Universidad Autónoma de Asunción =

Universidad Autónoma de Asunción may refer to:

- Universidad Autónoma de Asunción (football), Paraguayan women's football team
- Universidad Autónoma de Asunción (fútsal), Paraguayan fútsal team
- Universidad Autónoma de Asunción (university), private university in Asuncion
