= XHCUL-FM =

- Culiacán, Sinaloa; Mexico
- Frequency: 104.9 MHz
- Branding: La Bella

Programming
- Format: Women's talk

Ownership
- Owner: Capital Media; (Fundación Radiodifusoras Capital Jalisco, A.C.)
- Operator: Roque Mascareño Chávez

History
- First air date: November 10, 2020
- Call sign meaning: "Culiacán"

Technical information
- Licensing authority: CRT
- Class: A
- ERP: 3 kW
- HAAT: −0.4 m (−1.3 ft)
- Transmitter coordinates: 24°48′35.33″N 107°24′18.56″W

Links
- Webcast: Listen live
- Website: labella.fm

XHCUL-FM is a noncommercial social radio station broadcasting on 104.9 FM in Culiacán, Sinaloa, Mexico. The station is owned by a non-profit foundation associated with Capital Media and operated by Vibra Radio group, airing a women's talk format known as "La Bella". The station shares a transmitter site with XHNW-FM and XHFCS-FM in Culiacán.

== History ==
On November 17, 2015, Fundación Radiodifusoras Capital Jalisco, A.C., applied for a new social radio station at Culiacán, which was approved by the Federal Telecommunications Institute on January 31, 2018.

The station signed on and began broadcasting El Heraldo Radio on November 10, 2020, from its initial transmitter site, co-sited with Radio Sinaloa in the center of Culiacán.

On April 1, 2022, Heraldo Radio dropped eight stations, including XHCUL; Capital then began operating it itself and flipped the station to its Lokura FM Spanish adult hits format.

In June, Roque Mascareño Chávez, owner of XHVQ-FM 96.9, launched a female talk format known as "La Bella" on XHCUL. The station was announced as part of the first anniversary of Chávez's Vibra Radio group.
