= XHVOX-FM =

Radio station in Mazatlán, Sinaloa, Mexico

- Mazatlán, Sinaloa; Mexico
- Frequency: 98.7 MHz
- Branding: Los 40

Programming
- Format: Contemporary hit radio
- Affiliations: Radiopolis

Ownership
- Owner: Grupo Radio Cañón; (Radio Cañón, S.A. de C.V.)
- Sister stations: XHENX-FM

History
- First air date: 1939
- Former call signs: XEDS-AM (1939–1960); XEOW-AM (1960–1985); XEVOX-AM (1985–2010s)
- Former frequencies: 1400 kHz (1939–1960); 970 kHz (1960–2010s)
- Call sign meaning: Vox

Technical information
- Licensing authority: CRT
- Class: B1
- ERP: 25,000 watts
- HAAT: −17.9 m (−59 ft)
- Transmitter coordinates: 23°16′46″N 106°25′03″W

Links
- Webcast: Listen live
- Website: radiocanon.com.mx

XHVOX-FM is a radio station on 98.7 FM in Mazatlán, Sinaloa, Mexico. It is owned by Radio Cañón and known as Radio Cañón.

== History ==
XHVOX began operations in 1939 as XEDS-AM 1400, owned by Alejandro A. Schober. In 1960, Schober sold the station, and it became XEOW-AM, broadcasting on 970 kHz. It was owned by Mendivil y Elizalde, S.A. until its sale to Amplitud Modulada de Sinaloa, S.A., in 1985. Amplitud Modulada rechristened the station XEVOX-AM.

It was sold to ABC in 2004 and migrated to FM in 2011. In April 2018, operation of XHVOX and XHENX-FM 104.3 transferred to Grupo Siete, which instituted its Quiéreme romantic format on the station. In February 2022, Grupo Siete dropped operation of both stations after nearly four years, with the flagship Radio Cañón brand of the ABC group being brought to Mazatlán.

On April 24, 2023, as part of a national alliance between the company and Radiópolis, 22 NTR-owned stations adopted franchise formats from Radiópolis. With Ke Buena, already represented in Mazatlán, XHENX joined the Los 40 pop format. Los 40 had previously been in the market on XHZS-FM 100.3.
