= XHPNAS-FM =

Radio station in Navolato, Sinaloa

- Navolato, Sinaloa; Mexico
- Broadcast area: Culiacán, Sinaloa
- Frequency: 94.1 MHz (HD Radio)
- Branding: Stereo Uno

Programming
- Format: Pop music in English and Spanish

Ownership
- Owner: Luz Network; (Energía Radial en Comunicación, S.A. de C.V.)
- Sister stations: XHMSL-FM Los Mochis, XHPFRT-FM El Fuerte, XHZS-FM Mazatlán

History
- First air date: September 2019
- Call sign meaning: NAvolato Sinaloa

Technical information
- Licensing authority: CRT
- Class: A
- ERP: 1,500 watts
- HAAT: 89.6 m (294 ft)
- Transmitter coordinates: 24°46′06″N 107°35′02.73″W

Links
- Website: stereouno.fm www.luznoticias.mx

XHPNAS-FM is a radio station on 94.1 FM serving Navolato and Culiacán, Sinaloa. The station is owned by Luz Network and is known as Stereo Uno, carrying a pop music format in English and Spanish.

== History ==
XHPNAS-FM was one of two stations won by Luz Network, along with El Fuerte's XHPFRT-FM, in the IFT-4 radio station auction of 2017. It officially came on air in September 2019, carrying the same Stereo Uno brand and format heard on the company's flagship XHMSL-FM in Los Mochis. It is the first Luz Network station in central Sinaloa.
