= WYAH =

WYAH may refer to:

- WYAH-LP, a defunct radio station (93.7 FM) licensed to Winchester, Kentucky, United States
- WGNT, a television station (channel 20, virtual 27) licensed to Portsmouth, Virginia, United States, which used the WYAH-TV call sign from January 1961 to September 1989
