= XHAX-FM =

Radio station in Oaxaca, Oaxaca, Mexico

Oaxaca, Oaxaca; Mexico
- Frequency: 93.7 MHz
- Branding: Radio Fórmula

Programming
- Format: News/talk
- Affiliations: Radio Fórmula

Ownership
- Owner: Organización Radiofónica de Oaxaca; (Organización XHAX, S.A. de C.V.)

History
- First air date: May 25, 1941 (concession)
- Call sign meaning: Second and third letters of Oaxaca

Technical information
- ERP: 25 kW
- Transmitter coordinates: 17°04′12.97″N 96°43′50.77″W

Links
- Website: www.ororadio.com.mx/radio/

XHAX-FM is a radio station on 93.7 FM in Oaxaca, Oaxaca, Mexico. XHAX carries Radio Fórmula programming.

== History ==
XHAX is Oaxaca's oldest commercial radio station. It began as XEAX-AM 1270, receiving its concession on May 12, 1941 and signing on the 25th of the month. It was owned by Álvaro Rodríguez Avendano and broadcast under the name Cadena Radiodifusora Oaxaqueña (Oaxaca Broadcasting Network). XEAX also broadcast shortwave programs on XEAR 6035 kHz. The formal opening of the station was conducted by the state's governor, General Vicente González Fernández. It initially broadcast with 200 watts but moved its antenna to Cerro del Fortín and increased power to 500 watts about the same time the station took off, with popular programs such as one featuring Agustín Lara.

It would not be until 1956 that a competitor appeared on the Oaxaca AM dial. That station was XEOA-AM 570, and the two stations began an intense battle for listeners. By the 1960s, ownership had passed to the current concessionaire; the station would later move to 1080 in the late 1990s.

In 2011, it moved to FM on 93.7 MHz.
