= XHDIS-FM =

Radio station in Ciudad Delicias, Chihuahua

- Ciudad Delicias, Chihuahua; Mexico
- Broadcast area: Ciudad Delicias, Chihuahua
- Frequency: 93.7 FM
- Branding: Flamingo

Programming
- Format: Pop

Ownership
- Owner: Radiza; (Radiza, S.A. de C.V.)

History
- First air date: July 23, 1992
- Call sign meaning: DelIciaS

Technical information
- Licensing authority: CRT
- Class: B
- ERP: 50 kW
- HAAT: 103.6 m (340 ft)

Links
- Website: radiza.com.mx/radiza2018/

XHDIS-FM is a radio station on 93.7 FM in Ciudad Delicias, Chihuahua. The station is owned by Radiza and known as Flamingo with a pop format.

== History ==
XHDIS received its concession on July 17, 1992 and went on air six days later, the first FM station in Ciudad Delicias. The original concessionaire was Roberto Díaz García.
