= XHORF-FM =

Radio station in Los Mochis, Sinaloa, Mexico

- Mochicahui–Los Mochis, Sinaloa; Mexico
- Frequency: 99.7 MHz
- Branding: Planeta

Programming
- Format: Pop

Ownership
- Owner: Grupo Radio Centro; (XEORF, S.A. de C.V.)
- Sister stations: XHECU-FM, XHCW-FM, XHPNK-FM

History
- First air date: 1970
- Former call signs: XEORF-AM
- Former frequencies: 950 kHz

Technical information
- Licensing authority: CRT
- Class: B1
- ERP: 25 kW
- HAAT: 33.6 m (110 ft)
- Transmitter coordinates: 25°47′43.4″N 108°59′46.8″W

XHORF-FM is a radio station on 99.7 FM authorized to broadcast from Mochicahui in El Fuerte Municipality, Sinaloa, Mexico, covering the Los Mochis area. It is owned by Grupo Radio Centro and carries its Planeta pop format.

The station began broadcasting as an AM station from El Fuerte in 1970 and moved to Los Mochis in 1985. It moved to FM in 2011.

== History ==
XEORF-AM 950 received its concession on December 12, 1969 and began transmitions in 1970. The 4,000-watt station has always broadcast from the El Fuerte/Mochicahui area, and for the first 15 years of its existence, it was the main radio station for El Fuerte, Choix and the surrounding areas. In 1985, the del Bosque family relocated XEORF's studios to Los Mochis, leaving the town without a local radio station until XHPFRT-FM signed on in January 2019.

In 2011, XEORF moved to FM as XHORF-FM 99.7.

In May 2016, Grupo Radio México exited Los Mochis and transferred control of its stations to Radiorama. As a result, all its stations picked up Radiorama formats, with XHORF adopting the @FM format instead of GRM's similar Planeta format. At this time, the XHORF facility was relocated from Mochicahui into Los Mochis. XHORF returned to Planeta when GRC resumed operating the cluster in February 2019.
