= XHENX-FM =

Radio station in Mazatlán, Sinaloa

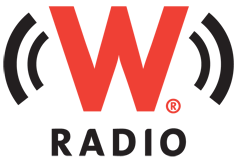
- Mazatlán, Sinaloa; Mexico
- Frequency: 104.3 MHz
- Branding: W Radio

Programming
- Format: News/Talk
- Affiliations: Radiopolis

Ownership
- Owner: Radio Cañón; (Radio Cañón, S.A. de C.V.)
- Sister stations: XHVOX-FM

History
- First air date: November 5, 1959 (concession)
- Former call signs: XENX-AM
- Former frequencies: 1270 kHz, 1290 kHz

Technical information
- Licensing authority: CRT
- Class: B1
- ERP: 25,000 watts
- HAAT: −17.9 m (−59 ft)
- Transmitter coordinates: 23°16′46″N 106°25′03″W

Links
- Webcast: Listen live
- Website: radiocanon.com.mx

XHENX-FM is a radio station on 104.3 FM in Mazatlán, Sinaloa, Mexico. It is owned by Radio Cañón and broadcasts a News/Talk format known as W Radio

== History ==
Logo as "Radio Mujer"

XHENX received its concession on November 5, 1959, as XENX-AM broadcasting on 1270 kHz, though it would soon slide up to 1290. It was owned by Difusoras de Mazatlán, S.A. The station had various formats and name changes prior to 2004, including "La Poderosa N-X" with a Regional Mexican format, "Fiesta Latina" playing hits in Spanish, and "90x Radio Extrema" playing a pop format. In 2004 the station was sold to ABC Radio and became Radio Mujer, a talk format aimed at women.

XENX migrated to FM in 2011. In April 2018, operation of XHENX and XHVOX-FM 98.7 transferred to Grupo Siete, which instituted its La Jefa Regional Mexican format on the station. In February 2022, Grupo Siete dropped operation of both stations after nearly four years with the "La Más Buena" brand used at two stations in Guerrero brought to Mazatlán; this was tweaked later in the year to "La Más Guapa".

On July 21, 2025, XHENX joined the W Radio news/talk network. W Radio had previously been in Mazatlán on XHFIL-FM 88.9 on MegaRadio Networks.
