= XHUNES-FM =

Radio station in Durango, Durango, Mexico

- Durango, Durango; Mexico
- Broadcast area: Durango
- Frequency: 92.9 FM
- Branding: España FM

Programming
- Format: Mexican college radio

Ownership
- Owner: Universidad España; (Universidad Autónoma España de Durango)
- Sister stations: XHUNES-TDT 8

History
- First air date: 2005
- Former call signs: XHUAED-FM (2004-05)
- Call sign meaning: UNiversidad ESpaña

Technical information
- Licensing authority: CRT
- Class: B1
- ERP: 10 kW
- HAAT: 12.43 m (40.8 ft)

Links
- Website: http://xhunesfm.vir.mx/#/

XHUNES-FM is a radio station on 92.9 FM in Durango, Durango. It is branded as España FM and operated by the Universidad España, a private institution of higher education.

== History ==
The Universidad España, legally known as the Universidad Autónoma España de Durango, received a permit for an FM station on November 8, 2004. The university, which uses the acronym UNES, promptly applied to have the calls of the station changed to XHUNES-FM from XHUAED-FM and to build the station with a power of 10,000 watts instead of 3,000, both approved.
