= XHBL-FM =

Radio station in Culiacán, Sinaloa, Mexico

- Culiacán, Sinaloa; Mexico
- Frequency: 91.9 MHz
- Branding: La Ke Buena

Programming
- Format: Regional Mexican
- Affiliations: Radiópolis

Ownership
- Owner: Radio TV México; (Amplitud Modulada 710, S.A.)
- Sister stations: XHMIL-FM, XHST-FM, XHWT-FM

History
- First air date: March 16, 1936; 1994 (FM)
- Former frequencies: 710 kHz (to 2018)
- Call sign meaning: Founder Max Gómez Blanco

Technical information
- Licensing authority: CRT
- Class: B1
- ERP: 10 kW
- HAAT: 41.16 m (135.0 ft)

Links
- Webcast: Listen live
- Website: radiotvmexico.com

XHBL-FM is a radio station on 91.9 FM in Culiacán, Sinaloa. The station is owned by Radio TV México and carries the La Ke Buena national Regional Mexican format from Radiópolis.

== History ==
Logo briefly used with the Ráfaga name

XEBL was the first radio station in Sinaloa. It officially came to air on March 16, 1936. While Ignacio L. Sais obtained the concession for the station, originally on 1920, it was Enrique Maximiliano Gómez Blanco who founded and would later own XEBL.

In the 1960s, XEBL expanded into television with the launch of XHBL-TV channel 13, also owned by Gómez Blanco. It was part of the Tele-Cadena Mexicana network. When TCM's stations were seized in 1975, XHBL fell into legal limbo, and its fate after 1975 is unknown.

In 1994, XEBL became a combo AM/FM station with the sign-on of XHBL-FM 91.9. The station surrendered its AM frequency to the Federal Telecommunications Institute on August 21, 2018.
