= XHREV-FM =

Radio station in Los Mochis, Sinaloa, Mexico

- Los Mochis, Sinaloa; Mexico
- Frequency: 104.3 MHz
- Branding: Vibra Radio

Programming
- Format: Regional Mexican

Ownership
- Owner: Roque Mascareño Chávez; (Red Empresarial Total, S.A. de C.V.)

History
- First air date: September 6, 1973 (concession); May 2011 (FM)
- Former call signs: XEZA-AM, XEFTA-AM, XEJJR-AM, XEREV-AM
- Former frequencies: 740 kHz, 770 kHz
- Call sign meaning: Station was known as "RadioEvolución"

Technical information
- Licensing authority: CRT
- Class: B1
- ERP: 10 kW
- HAAT: 159.8 m (524 ft)
- Transmitter coordinates: 25°48′29″N 108°58′06″W

Links
- Website: vibra.red

XHREV-FM is a radio station on 104.3 FM in Los Mochis, Sinaloa. It is owned by Roque Mascareño Chávez as one of four stations in the Vibra group and carries a Regional Mexican format known as Vibra Radio.

== History ==
XEZA-AM 740, originally broadcasting in Topolobampo, received its concession on September 6, 1973. The 250-watt station was owned by Ernesto Tirado Zavala and was originally airing a Regional Mexican format known as "La Z".

In the early 1990s, XEZA was moved to 770 kHz and increased its power to 5,000 watts as a daytimer in order to move to Los Mochis and rebranded as "Z77" keeping its Regional Mexican brand. It was acquired by Radio Z, S.A. in 1990, changing its callsign to XEFTA-AM and became "X-7 La Magnífica". XEFTA became XEJJR-AM later in the 1990s; during this time, XEJJR broadcast a Regional Mexican format as "La K-Guapa". In 2005, the station changed its calls once again to XEREV-AM, matching the brand as "RadioEvolución", and in 2008 it became the Los 40 Principales format from Televisa Radio.

In May 2011, XHREV-FM 104.3 came to air, migrating to FM. In June 2021, Grupo Chávez Radio leased XHREV and XHGML-FM in Guamúchil to Roque Mascareño Chávez—grandson of the founder of Chávez Radio—for his Vibra Radio venture, which had also purchased XHVQ-FM in Culiacán and XHMAT-FM in Mazatlán.

In January 2023, the pop format was replaced outside the Culiacán area with a Regional Mexican format.
