= XHWS-FM =

Radio station in Culiacán, Sinaloa

- Culiacán, Sinaloa; Mexico
- Frequency: 102.5 MHz
- Branding: La Bestia Grupera

Programming
- Format: Regional Mexican
- Affiliations: Grupo Audiorama Comunicaciones

Ownership
- Owner: Grupo RSN; (XHWS, S.A. de C.V.)

History
- First air date: November 15, 1957 (concession)
- Former call signs: XEWS-AM
- Former frequencies: 1010 kHz

Technical information
- Licensing authority: CRT
- Class: B1
- ERP: 25 kW
- HAAT: 35.92 m (117.8 ft)
- Transmitter coordinates: 24°49′56″N 107°24′17″W

Links
- Website: www.rsn.com.mx/gruporsn/

XHWS-FM is a radio station on 102.5 FM in Culiacán, Sinaloa. It is owned by Grupo RSN and carries a Regional Mexican format known as La Bestia Grupera.

== History ==
XEWS-AM 1010 received its concession on November 15, 1957. It was owned by Modesto Roberto Pérez and broadcast with 5,000 watts day and 250 night. Humaya, S.A. acquired XEWS in the 1960s. Eventually, Grupo ACIR owned the station and carried the formats including Radio Capital, Radio ACIR, and Inolvidable beginning in 2003. In April 2009, as part of a transaction involving most ACIR stations, it was sold to Radiorama to broadcast Romántica 1010, maintaining the romantic format.

XEWS was moved to FM in 2010. In 2015, Romántica was moved to another XHCSI-FM 89.5 and the Los 40 Principales franchise becoming the station that previously broadcast XHIN-FM 95.3. In December 2016, XHWS and sister station XHENZ-FM 92.9 were separated from Radiorama and flipped to MegaRadio formats, marking MegaRadio's second expansion in Sinaloa in just months after it had previously entered Mazatlán. As a result, XHWS flipped from Los 40 to Switch FM, keeping a pop format. This lasted until June 2017, when the Audiorama La Bestia Grupera format was instituted.

In mid-2017, XHWS was sold by Radiorama to RSN, making it sister to XHESA-FM 101.7. However, XHWS continues to carry the La Bestia Grupera format and was also the Culiacán affiliate for the national afternoon newscast hosted by Javier Alatorre, which was syndicated by Grupo Comunicación Integral de México, a company affiliated with Audiorama.
