= XHEMOS-FM =

Radio station in Los Mochis, Sinaloa, Mexico

Defunct
- Los Mochis, Sinaloa; Mexico
- Frequency: 94.1 MHz

Ownership
- Owner: Grupo Radiorama; (Radio Vinculación, S.A.)
- Operator: Promomedios/Radio TV México
- Sister stations: XHMIL-FM

History
- First air date: 1995
- Last air date: January 29, 2025
- Former call signs: XEMOS-AM
- Former frequencies: 1130 kHz
- Call sign meaning: "Los Mochis"

Technical information
- ERP: 25 kW
- Transmitter coordinates: 25°47′19.2″N 108°59′53.1″W

XHEMOS-FM was a radio station on 94.1 FM in Los Mochis, Sinaloa. The station last aired the Los 40 Principales national format from Radiópolis.

== History ==
Logo used as Pop FM from 2014 to 2016

XEMOS-AM received its concession on October 28, 1994 and began transmitions in 1995, operating on 1130 kHz as a 500-watt daytimer. XEMOS later boosted its power to 1 kW during the day with 250 watts at night. In 2000, the station began broadcasting as "Radiomía" with a Spanish-language adult hits format. In 2006, it switched to a Regional Mexican format known as La Invasora.

The station was authorized to migrate to FM as XHEMOS-FM in 2011. The station was renamed as La Poderosa before two format changes in the course of 2012: to W Radio with a news/talk format in January and to an English-language classic hits format as known as Éxtasis Digital in October.

In 2014, Grupo Radiorama began joint operations with Grupo Promomedios of the former's Los Mochis cluster. That resulted in new formats for XHEMOS and sister station XHMIL-FM 90.1, with XHEMOS converting to pop music as Pop FM 94.1. In 2016, the format for XHEMOS was tweaked from straight pop to "Pop Love" with the addition of Spanish adult hits to the station's playlist.

Management later shifted to Radio TV México. The format was changed to the Radiópolis "Vox Love Station" format, largely in the same genre, in April 2020. It was the second station to adopt the brand and the first in nearly two years. On August 31, 2021, Vox was replaced by Los 40 Principales, which had been dropped by XHREV-FM 104.3 months prior when it was leased out.

The concession for XHEMOS-FM expired with an untimely renewal after October 3, 2016. The station was officially taken off the air on January 29, 2025.
