= XHZQ-FM =

Radio station in Cunduacán–Villahermosa, Tabasco

- Cunduacán, Tabasco; Mexico
- Broadcast area: Villahermosa
- Frequency: 93.7 FM
- Branding: ZQ, Radio Futurama

Programming
- Format: Full-service radio

Ownership
- Owner: María de los Ángeles Espinosa de los Monteros de la Cruz, Oscar and Carlos Zerecero Espinosa de los Monteros

History
- First air date: October 28, 1970 (concession)

Technical information
- ERP: 6 kW
- Transmitter coordinates: 17°58′34″N 93°05′53″W

Links
- Webcast: Listen live
- Website: xhzqfm.com

XHZQ-FM is a radio station on 93.7 FM in Cunduacán, Tabasco, Mexico.

== History ==
XEZQ-AM 1520 received its concession on October 28, 1970. It was owned by Carlos Zerecero Díaz and broadcast from Huimanguillo with 1,000 watts day and 100 night. By 1993, XEZQ was on 820 kHz with 3,000 watts day and 250 watts night. Not long after, it moved to 830 with 5,000 watts day and 1,000 at night. The current concessionaires are Zerecero Díaz's heirs.

XEZQ migrated to FM in 2010.

This station was affiliated with Radiorama from 2010 to 2018. It currently broadcasts with musical programming,
