= XHTLAC-FM =

Radio station in Tlacotalpan, Veracruz

Tlacotalpan, Veracruz; Mexico
- Frequency: 93.7 FM
- Branding: Viva la Cuenca Radio

Programming
- Format: Cultural

Ownership
- Owner: La Comunidad Unida Por Su Cultura, A.C.

History
- First air date: August 1, 2012 (permit)
- Call sign meaning: TLACotalpan

Technical information
- ERP: 2.9 kW
- HAAT: 50.42 m
- Transmitter coordinates: 18°37′26.29″N 95°40′52.6″W

XHTLAC-FM is a noncommercial radio station on 93.7 FM in Tlacotalpan, Veracruz, Mexico. It is owned by La Comunidad Unida Por Su Cultura, A.C., and is part of the Radio Voces de Veracruz network of permit stations in northern Veracruz, operating as Viva la Cuenca Radio.

== History ==
XHTLAC was permitted on August 1, 2012.
