= KSBV =

- Salida, Colorado; United States
- Frequency: 93.7 MHz
- Branding: The River Rat

Programming
- Format: Classic rock

Ownership
- Owner: Marc Scott; (Arkansas Valley Broadcasting, Inc.)

History
- First air date: 2002

Technical information
- Licensing authority: FCC
- Facility ID: 87873
- Class: C2
- ERP: 1,000 watts
- HAAT: 830 meters (2,720 ft)
- Transmitter coordinates: 38°26′47″N 106°0′37″W

Links
- Public license information: Public file; LMS

KSBV (93.7 FM, "The River Rat") is a radio station broadcasting a classic rock music format. Licensed to Salida, Colorado, United States, the station is currently owned by Marc Scott, through licensee Arkansas Valley Broadcasting, Inc.
