= Universidad Autónoma de Asunción (fútsal) =

Fútsal club in Asunción, Paraguay

- Nickname(s): UAA
- Ground: Asunción, Paraguay
- League: Campeonato de Futsal de Paraguay

UAA is the fútsal club in the sports department at the Universidad Autónoma de Asunción located in Asunción, the capital city of Paraguay and competes in the Asociación Paraguaya de Fútbol's fútsal league. The UAA fields both a Men's and Female's team. The UAA's Men's team has been crowned champion of Paraguay on two occasions, qualifying and participating at the Fútsal Copa Libertadores and defeating traditional teams such as Boca Juniors, River Plate and Peñarol. The UAA Female's team has been crowned champion of Paraguay on various occasions, defeating traditional Paraguayan teams such as Cerro Porteño, Olimpia Asunción and Nacional Asunción.

== History ==
=== Men's team ===
In 2003, the UAA became champion of the División de Honor Torneo Apertura after defeating Rojas Silva 5–2.

In July 2005, the UAA Men's team were crowned undefeated champions of the Southern Zone Futsal Copa Libertadores after defeating Uruguayan team Malvin 6–1 at a stadium inside the Dirección General de Deportes. At half-time, the fixture was 2–0 in favour of the UAA from goals by César Riveros. Being the winner of the Southern Zone, the UAA would advance to face the winner of the Northern Zone to determine the overall champion.

In February 2006, the UAA played against Northern Zone winner and the then Futsal Copa Libertadores champion, Brazil's Malwee Jaraguá, in the Futsal Copa Libertadores finals. For the finals, Olimpia Asunción's Rodrigo Barrios, and Deportivo Recoleta's Jose Santander and Jose Felix Ortiz were incorporated to the squad.

In 2007, the UAA was crowned undefeated champions of an U17 Paraguay-Uruguay International Tournament.

=== Female's Team ===
In August 2016 in the Female Futsal Copa Libertadores, the UAA team finished the tournament in seventh place. The team began the tournament successfully with goaling victory against Atlante from Bolivia, but ended up losing its last three fixtures against Barateiro, San Lorenzo and Río Negro.

In June 2018, Club Universitarios de Deportes defeated the UAA 12–2 in the first round of the 2018 Liga Premium versión femenina, competing in the same league as Cerro Porteño and Sport Colonial.

In July of the 2019 Liga Femenina de Honor Futsal, the UAA recorded a 3–1 triumph against Carlos Antonio Lopez to attain 18 points, behind league leaders Cerro Porteño and Sport Colonial.

== Coaches ==
=== Men's ===
- 2005: Adolfo Ruiz Diaz
- 2006: Juan Carlos Orihuela and Ruben Subeldia
