= XHUNES-TDT =

University television station in Durango City, Mexico

- Durango, Durango; Mexico
- Channels: Digital: 11 (VHF); Virtual: 8
- Branding: XHUNES España TV 8.1

Programming
- Affiliations: Independent educational

Ownership
- Owner: Universidad Autonoma España de Durango
- Sister stations: XHUNES-FM 92.9

History
- Founded: February 28, 2008
- Former call signs: XHPBDG-TDT (Note: Assigned to the channel 11 concession when it was awarded. Changed in 2022.)
- Former channel numbers: 28 (analog, 2008-2015); 16 (virtual, 2015-2016; physical, 2015–2022)
- Call sign meaning: Universidad España

Technical information
- Licensing authority: CRT
- ERP: 1.48 kW
- HAAT: 162.2 m (532 ft)
- Transmitter coordinates: 24°3′4″N 104°37′56″W

Links
- Website: xhunestv.unes.edu.mx

XHUNES-TDT is an educational television station founded in 2008 by the Universidad España (Spanish University) in Durango, Mexico.

Dedicated to cultural and scientific diversity, XHUNES-TDT broadcasts 24 hours per day. Operated by university staff as well as degree students in various fields of communications, it operates as a teaching and educational facility and a sister station to XHUNES-FM 92.9 radio.

The first university television station in the state of Durango, XHUNES-TDT programming covers natural and social sciences as well as investigative journalism, serving as a laboratory for graduate and undergraduate students of the School of Communication Sciences in degree programs such as marketing, journalism, public relations & corporate image, and graphic design.

The station signed on in analog and converted to digital on physical channel 16, effective December 22, 2015. As a result of the expiration of the permit without renewal, the UNES received a second concession for XHPBDG-TDT on VHF channel 11, which became the new XHUNES-TDT in 2022.
