= XHCW-FM =

Radio station in Los Mochis, Sinaloa

- Los Mochis, Sinaloa; Mexico
- Frequency: 96.5 FM
- Branding: La Z

Programming
- Format: Regional Mexican

Ownership
- Owner: Grupo Radio Centro; (Radio y Televisión de Sinaloa, S.A. de C.V.)
- Sister stations: XHORF-FM, XHPNK-FM, XHECU-FM

History
- First air date: November 3, 1958 (concession)
- Former call signs: XECW-AM
- Former frequencies: 1340 kHz, 740 kHz

Technical information
- Licensing authority: CRT
- Class: B1
- ERP: 25 kW
- HAAT: 74.67 m (245.0 ft)
- Transmitter coordinates: 25°45′40.76″N 109°00′00″W

Links
- Webcast: XHCW-FM

XHCW-FM is a radio station on 96.5 FM in Los Mochis, Sinaloa. It is owned by Grupo Radio Centro and is known as La Z with a Regional Mexican format.

== History ==
XECW-AM 1340 received its concession on November 3, 1958. The 1,000-watt station was owned by Luis Pérez Gómez until 1977, when it was acquired by Radio del Comercio Local de la Provincia, S.A. de C.V. The current concessionaire picked up XECW in 1992. 2007 saw XECW being moved from 1340 to 740 kHz with 5,000 watts day and 1,000 at night.

In 2011, XECW was moved to FM as XHCW-FM 96.5.

In May 2016, Grupo Radio México exited Los Mochis, with Radiorama assuming operational control. As a result, all its stations picked up Radiorama formats, with XHCW adopting the Romántica format. The station was later changed to La Poderosa before Radio Centro resumed operating the cluster, returning La Z to Los Mochis.
