= XHGS-FM =

Radio station in Guasave, Sinaloa

XHGS-FM/XEGS-AM
- Guasave, Sinaloa; Mexico
- Frequency: 104.7 FM/610 AM
- Branding: La GS

Programming
- Format: News/talk

Ownership
- Owner: Grupo Chávez Radio; (Radiodifusores por Tradición, S.A. de C.V.)

History
- First air date: December 9, 1948 (concession)
- Former frequencies: 106.1 MHz (2011–2020)

Technical information
- Licensing authority: CRT
- Class: B1 (FM); B (AM)
- Power: 6,000 Watts day/1,000 watts night
- ERP: 12.66 kW
- HAAT: 95.89 m (314.6 ft)
- Transmitter coordinates: 25°32′02″N 108°29′12″W

Links
- Website: grupochavezradio.com

XHGS-FM is a radio station on 104.7 FM in Guasave, Sinaloa, Mexico. It is owned by Grupo Chávez Radio and known as La GS with a news/talk format.

== History ==
XEGS-AM 610 received its concession on December 9, 1948. The 1,000-watt station was owned by Salvador Chávez Castro. 49 years later, ownership was transferred to Roque Chávez Castro, and from 2006 to 2013, Silvia López Inzunza was the concessionaire. XEGS later increased its power to 6 kW day and 1 kW night.

XEGS migrated to FM in 2011 as XHGS-FM 106.1. It moved to 104.7 MHz on December 7, 2020, after the Federal Telecommunications Institute (IFT) ordered the change to clear 106–108 MHz for community radio stations in the Guasave area.

La GS is one of three talk-formatted stations owned by Grupo Chávez Radio in Sinaloa: the others are XHTNT-FM in Los Mochis and XHJL-FM in Guamúchil.
