= KXWX =

- Mohave Valley, Arizona; United States
- Broadcast area: Bullhead City, Arizona; Fort Mohave, Arizona; Needles, California
- Frequency: 93.7 MHz
- Branding: 10 X Rock

Programming
- Format: Alternative rock

Ownership
- Owner: Big River Broadcasting LLC

History
- First air date: 2010
- Former call signs: KVAL (2008); KVYL (2008–2023)

Technical information
- Licensing authority: FCC
- Facility ID: 164262
- Class: C3
- ERP: 620 watts
- HAAT: 566 meters (1,857 ft)
- Transmitter coordinates: 35°01′58″N 114°21′57″W
- Translator: See below

Links
- Public license information: Public file; LMS
- Website: 10xrock.com

KXWX (93.7 FM) is a radio station licensed to Mohave Valley, Arizona. The station broadcasts an alternative rock format and is owned by Big River Broadcasting LLC.

== History ==
Former logo

The station was first licensed as KVYL in August 2010, and originally aired an adult album alternative format, branded as "Vinyl FM", with programming from Timeless Cool. In 2018, the station switched to an alternative rock format branded 10 X Rock.

On March 14, 2023, the station changed its call sign to KXWX.

== Translators ==
KXWX is also heard in Lake Havasu City, Arizona through a translator at 99.9 MHz and in Kingman, Arizona through translators at 93.3 MHz and 96.3 MHz

Broadcast translators for KXWX
Call sign	Frequency	City of license	FID	ERP (W)	HAAT	Class	FCC info
K227CS	93.3 FM	Kingman, Arizona	152138	10	0 m (0 ft)	D	LMS
K242AQ	96.3 FM	Kingman, Arizona	30449	38	882 m (2,894 ft)	D	LMS
K260BR	99.9 FM	Lake Havasu City, Arizona	40555	34	816.2 m (2,678 ft)	D	LMS
