= XHEORO-FM =

Radio station in Guasave, Sinaloa

- Guasave, Sinaloa; Mexico
- Frequency: 93.7 MHz
- Branding: La Mera Jefa

Programming
- Format: Regional Mexican

Ownership
- Owner: Radiosistema del Noroeste; (Grupo RSN de Guasave, S.A. de C.V.)
- Sister stations: XHGSE-FM

History
- First air date: January 28, 1964 (concession)
- Former call signs: XEORO-AM
- Former frequencies: 680 kHz
- Call sign meaning: "Oro", gold in Spanish

Technical information
- Licensing authority: CRT
- Class: B1
- ERP: 25 kW
- HAAT: 76.3 m (250 ft)
- Transmitter coordinates: 25°32′18.63″N 108°27′33.58″W

Links
- Website: lamerajefa.com

XHEORO-FM is a radio station on 93.7 FM in Guasave, Sinaloa. It is owned by Radiosistema del Noroeste and known as La Mera Jefa with a Regional Mexican format.

== History ==
XEORO-AM 680 received its concession on January 28, 1964. The 1,000-watt daytimer was owned by Óscar Chávez Castro.

XEORO decided to migrate to FM in 2011 as XHEORO-FM 93.7.

Despite being owned by a member of the Chávez López family that owns Grupo Chávez Radio, XHEORO is operated by Radiosistema del Noroeste. In June 2016, the IFT approved the transfer of the XHEORO concession to Grupo RSN de Guasave, S.A. de C.V.
