= Universidad Autónoma Indígena de México =

University in Sinaloa, Mexico

Autonomous Indigenous University of Mexico
- Universidad Autónoma Indígena de México
- Former names: Universidad Autónoma Indígena de México (2001–16), Universidad Autónoma Intercultural de Sinaloa (2006–2019)
- Motto: Toda la gente, todos los pueblos (Símen yoemia, simen pa?lia yolem'mem)
- Motto in English: All people, all communities
- Type: Public intercultural
- Established: 5 December 2001
- Rector: Dra. María Guadalupe Ibarra Ceceña
- Students: 4,300 (2016)
- Location: Mochicahui, Sinaloa, Mexico; 25.9496°N 108.9285°W
- Colors: Green and gold
- Mascot: Chureas (Roadrunners in Yoreme)
- Website: uais.edu.mx

The Universidad Autónoma Indígena de México (Autonomous Indigenous University of Mexico, UAIM) is a public institution of higher education in Mochicahui, El Fuerte Municipality, Sinaloa. It operates in Mochicahui, Los Mochis and Choix, as well as three extension centers.

== History ==
The UAIM was founded on 5 December 2001. It evolved from the Institute of Anthropology, also based in Mochicahui and part of the Universidad de Occidente, which had been formed in 1982. It conducted archeological projects, and in the late 1990s, it separated, with Governor Juan S. Millán decreeing the creation of the UAIM as a separate entity. At that time, it had 1,000 students from 15 ethnic groups.

In 2011, students demanded the resignation of rector Guadalupe Camargo Orduño, claiming that he was improperly sworn in by the governor instead of the university's governing board. They took over campus facilities for two months, only leaving when state authorities agreed to audit the university. They also claimed that what had been an innovative university had gradually become more traditional, with less advising for students from low-income backgrounds, fewer research and debate projects, and more classes held in classrooms instead of on patios and in the field. They also protested against the removal of eight professors and the addition of non-academics to the UAIM governing board, as well as the university's denial of admission to some students from indigenous backgrounds.

In 2016, the name of the university was changed as part of the passage of a new organic law by the state legislature that transitioned the school from an indigenous to an intercultural university; as a result, students from non-indigenous backgrounds could begin attending the newly renamed Universidad Autónoma Intercultural de Sinaloa (UAIS). There was opposition to the name change from some who felt that removing "Indigenous" from the name took away a key part of the spirit of the institution. University and state officials worked to dispel claims that the university was closing, claiming that the name change would expand the funding sources available to the institution. Additionally, the institution began offering bachillerato programs and online educational services for the first time.

The National Human Rights Commission challenged the name change in court, alleging violations of the rights of indigenous people who were not consulted about the new name. The Supreme Court of Justice of the Nation agreed and ordered the state government to restore the UAIM name in June 2018. The organic law of the university was officially modified on 28 November 2019, reverting the name to Universidad Autónoma Indígena de México.

On 9 May 2019, XHMFS-FM 95.7 signed on, making the UAIS the first intercultural university in Mexico to own and operate a radio station.

== Academic programs ==
UAIM offers undergraduate degrees at its Mochicahui, Los Mochis and Choix units, as well as at three extension centers. One degree is offered entirely online.

=== Mochicahui ===
- Computational Systems Engineering
- Quality Systems Engineering
- Forestry Engineering
- Social Community Psychology
- Entrepreneurial Tourism
- Rural Sociology
- Accounting
- Law

=== Los Mochis ===
- Computational Systems Engineering
- Quality Systems Engineering
- Social Community Psychology
- Rural Sociology
- Accounting
- Law

=== Choix ===
- Computational Systems Engineering
- Community Forestry Engineering
- Alternative Tourism

=== Online ===
- Law

=== Extension centers ===
- Extensión Topolobampo

- Quality Systems Engineering
- Law

- Extensión El Tajito, Guasave

- Quality Systems Engineering
- Community Business Management and Engineering
- Social Community Psychology
- Law

- Extensión Jahuara II, Valle del Carrizo

- Quality Systems Engineering
- Community Business Management and Engineering
- Social Community Psychology
- Law
