= XHST-FM =

Radio station in Mazatlán, Sinaloa, Mexico

Defunct
- Mazatlán, Sinaloa; Mexico
- Frequency: 94.7 MHz

Ownership
- Owner: Promomedios Sinaloa; (Información Radiofónica, S.A.)
- Operator: Radio TV México

History
- First air date: May 26, 1988 (concession); July 2011 (FM)
- Last air date: December 31, 2025

Technical information
- ERP: 25 kW
- Transmitter coordinates: 23°13′55″N 106°23′37″W

XHST-FM was a radio station on 94.7 FM in Mazatlán, Sinaloa. The station last aired the Ke Buena national Regional Mexican format from Radiópolis.

== History ==
XEST-AM 690 received its concession on May 26, 1988. It operated with 2,000 watts during the day and 100 (later 250) watts at night. At first, the station was known as Radio Sensación, a pop format in Spanish and English. In late 2001, it switched to Red W Interactiva news/talk format until February 2002, when it changed its "Promo Red" format, and in 2007 it changed to a Regional Mexican format known as "La Invasora".

In July 2011, XHST-FM 94.7, came to air, migrated to FM and changed to adult ballads in Spanish first as Tu Recuerdo and soon changed to Romántica. In May 2016, XHST along with XHZS and XHVU was moved from Grupo Radiorama to MegaRadio, with XHST converting to MegaRadio's equivalent Romance format. In 2017, Grupo Promomedios began operating XHST with an English classic hits format as Krystal, which lasted until March 2018, to flip the Ke Buena after XHMMS jettisoned the franchise.

The concession for XHST-FM expired with an untimely renewal after October 3, 2016. The station ceased broadcasting on December 31, 2025 and officially went off the air.
