= XHMFS-FM =

Radio station in Mochicahui, Sinaloa

- Mochicahui, El Fuerte Municipality, Sinaloa; Mexico
- Frequency: 95.7 MHz
- Branding: Radio UAIS

Programming
- Format: Indigenous university radio

Ownership
- Owner: Universidad Autónoma Intercultural de Sinaloa

History
- First air date: May 9, 2019
- Call sign meaning: Mochicahui, El Fuerte, Sinaloa

Technical information
- Licensing authority: CRT
- Class: A
- ERP: 3,000 watts
- HAAT: 21.4 m (70 ft)
- Transmitter coordinates: 25°57′16.3″N 108°55′36.4″W

XHMFS-FM is a public radio station on 95.7 FM in Mochicahui, El Fuerte Municipality, Sinaloa, Mexico. It is the radio station of the Universidad Autónoma Intercultural de Sinaloa (Autonomous Intercultural University of Sinaloa) and broadcasts from studios and transmitter on the university's Mochicahui campus.

== History ==
The Universidad Autónoma Indígena de México (Autonomous Indigenous University of Mexico), as the UAIS was originally known, applied for a radio station permit on May 16, 2012. The IFT approved the station application on January 25, 2017, making the UAIS the first intercultural university in Mexico to operate a radio station.

After more than two years and an investment of more than 3 million pesos in building renovations and transmission equipment, XHMFS signed on at noon on May 9, 2019.
