= Universidad Autónoma de Durango =

Private university in Durango, Mexico

Coordinates: 24.0480°N 104.6315°W

Autonomous University of Durango
- Universidad Autónoma de Durango
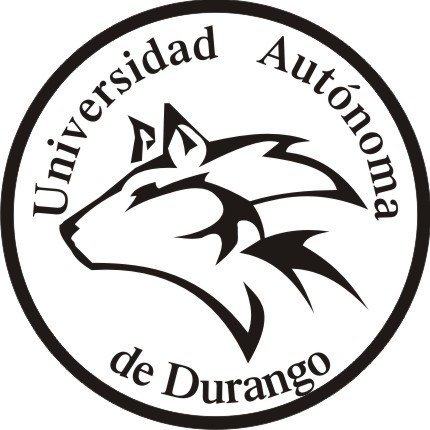
- Motto: Una opción a la excelencia
- Motto in English: An option to excellence
- Type: Private
- Established: 11 February 1992
- Rector: Martin Soriano Sariñana
- Students: 16,036 (2021)
- Location: Durango City, Durango, Mexico
- Colors: Red, black and gray
- Mascot: Lobos
- Website: uad.mx

The Universidad Autónoma de Durango (Autonomous University of Durango or Universidad Durango Santander or UAD) is a private university with its main campus located in Durango City, Durango and with campuses in multiple Mexican states. It was founded on 11 February 1992 and is operated by the Fomento Educativo y Cultural Francisco de Ibarra, A.C.

The university serves some 16,000 students on its own at high school, undergraduate and postgraduate level and offers distance learning. The university also offers bilingual (English and Spanish) education from kindergarten to high school with Colegio de Inglés.

== Programs ==
UAD offers full-time studies courses, part-time study courses, online distance learning and Saturday and evening courses. The degrees can be on a quarter or semester system. Postgraduate courses are on a semester system, and are offered only on the weekends.

The following are the undergraduate and graduate degrees taught by the university in its different campuses. The educational courses offered varies in each campus:

=== Undergraduate Degrees ===
- Architecture
- Business
- Business Management Administration
- Certified Public Accountant Auditor
- Certified Public Accountant
- Cinema and Audiovisual Production
- Communication Sciences and Techniques
- Cosmetology
- Criminology
- Digital Graphic Design
- Fashion design
- Financial administration
- Gastronomy
- International relations
- International Trade
- Law
- Marketing
- Media Design
- Medicine
- Nursing
- Nutrition
- Odontology
- Physical education
- Public Relations
- Psychology
- Psychopedagogy
- Theology
- Tourism Enterprise Management

=== Graduate Degrees ===
- Finance
- Geriatrics
- Law
- Judicial Public Speaking
- Real Estate Valuation
- Senior Management and Business Management
- Tax Law

=== Doctorate Degrees ===
- Constitutional, Criminal and Protection Law
- Education
- Management

== List of campuses throughout Mexico ==
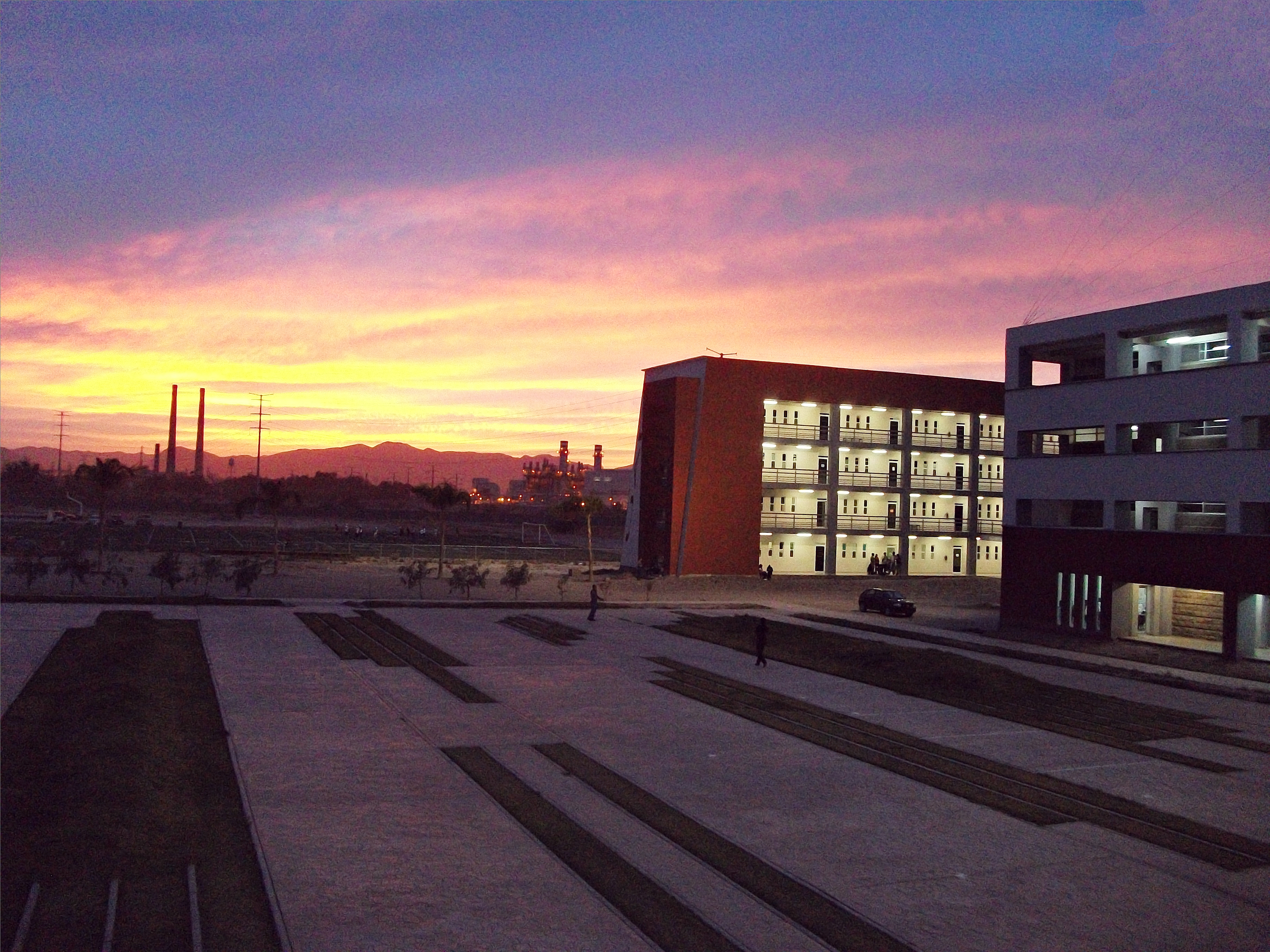
UAD Campus Laguna in Gómez Palacio, Durango

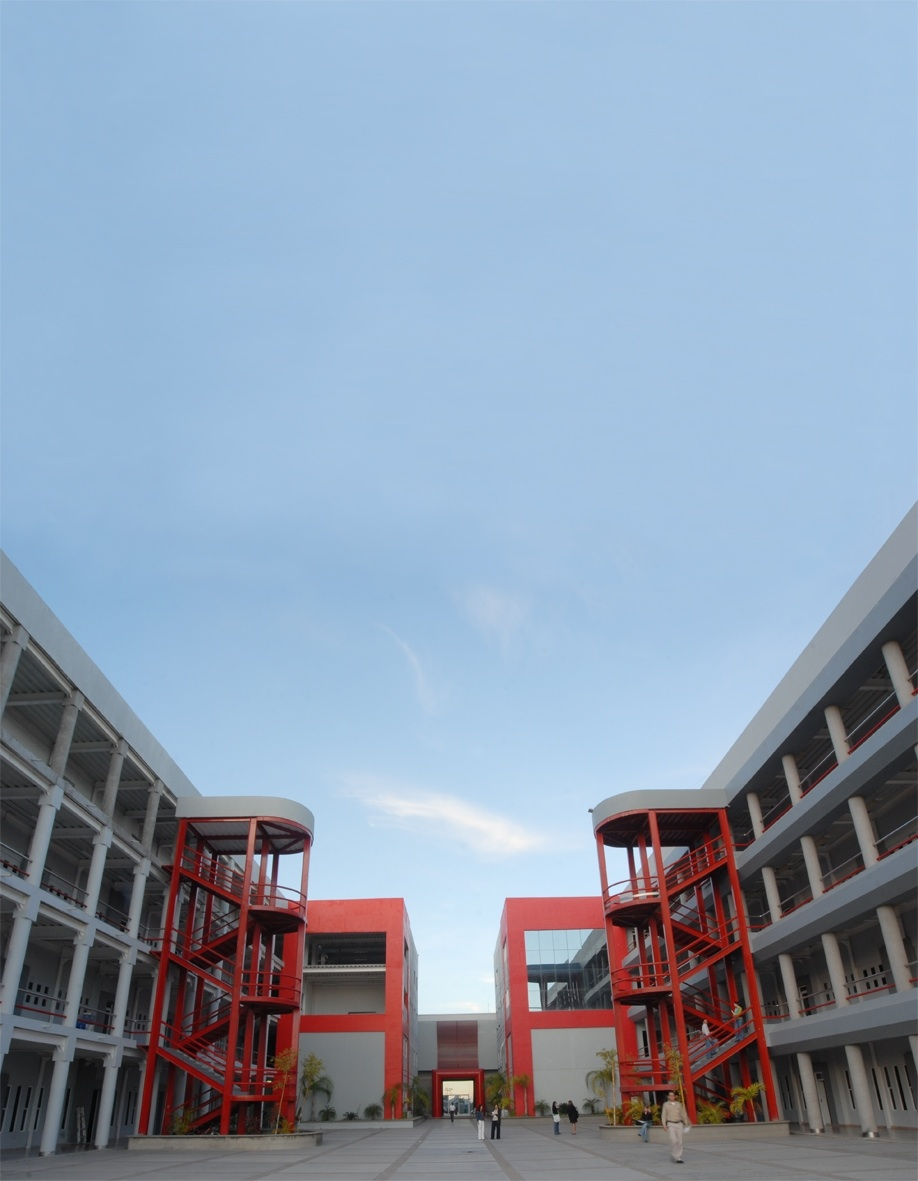
UAD Campus in Mazatlán, Sinaloa

Campus	City	State
Universidad Autónoma de Durango Campus Aguascalientes	Aguascalientes City	Aguascalientes
Universidad Autónoma de Durango Campus Ensenada	Ensenada	Baja California
Universidad Autónoma de Durango Campus Mexicali	Mexicali	Baja California
Universidad Autónoma de Durango Campus Tijuana	Tijuana	Baja California
Universidad Autónoma de Durango Campus Chihuahua	Chihuahua City	Chihuahua
Universidad Autónoma de Durango Campus Ciudad Juárez	Ciudad Juárez	Chihuahua
Universidad Autónoma de Durango Campus Monclova	Monclova	Coahuila
Universidad Autónoma de Durango Campus Torreón	Torreón	Coahuila
Universidad Autónoma de Durango Campus Saltillo	Saltillo	Coahuila
Universidad Autónoma de Durango Campus Durango	Durango City	Durango
Universidad Autónoma de Durango Campus Laguna	Gómez Palacio	Durango
Universidad Autónoma de Durango Campus Santiago Papasquiaro	Santiago Papasquiaro	Durango
Universidad Autónoma de Durango Campus Pachuca	Pachuca	Hidalgo
Universidad Autónoma de Durango Campus Mexico City	Mexico City	Mexico City
Universidad Autónoma de Durango Campus Morelia	Morelia	Michoacán
Universidad Autónoma de Durango Campus Monterrey	Monterrey	Nuevo León
Universidad Autónoma de Durango Campus Querétaro	Querétaro City	Querétaro
Universidad Autónoma de Durango Campus Culiacán	Culiacán	Sinaloa
Universidad Autónoma de Durango Campus Guasave	Guasave	Sinaloa
Universidad Autónoma de Durango Campus Los Mochis	Los Mochis	Sinaloa
Universidad Autónoma de Durango Campus Mazatlán	Mazatlán	Sinaloa
Universidad Durango Santander Campus Ciudad Obregón	Ciudad Obregón	Sonora
Universidad Durango Santander Campus Hermosillo	Hermosillo	Sonora
Universidad Durango Santander Campus Nogales	Nogales	Sonora
Universidad Autónoma de Durango Campus Fresnillo	Fresnillo	Zacatecas
Universidad Autónoma de Durango Campus Zacatecas	Zacatecas City	Zacatecas

== Media ==
UAD operates the Lobos FM radio network, with stations at Durango, Gómez Palacio, Mazatlán, Hermosillo, Los Mochis, Zacatecas and Culiacán. In addition, UAD operates a television station in Durango, XHUAD-TDT channel 4.
