= XHECU-FM =

Radio station in Los Mochis, Sinaloa

- Los Mochis, Sinaloa; Mexico
- Frequency: 91.7 FM
- Branding: La Rancherita

Programming
- Format: Regional Mexican

Ownership
- Owner: Grupo Radio Centro; (Radio y Televisión de Sinaloa, S.A. de C.V.)
- Sister stations: XHCW-FM, XHORF-FM, XHPNK-FM

History
- First air date: January 6, 1951 (concession)
- Former frequencies: 1470 kHz, 1450 kHz

Technical information
- Licensing authority: CRT
- Class: B1
- ERP: 25 kW
- HAAT: 74.67 m (245.0 ft)
- Transmitter coordinates: 25°45′40.76″N 109°00′00″W

Links
- Webcast: Listen live

XHECU-FM is a radio station on 91.7 FM in Los Mochis, Sinaloa. It is owned by Grupo Radio Centro and carries a Regional Mexican format known as La Rancherita.

== History ==
XECU-AM 1470 received its concession on January 6, 1951. The 250-watt station was owned by Luis Pérez Gómez until 1977, when it was acquired by Radio Local de la Provincia, S.A. de C.V. The current concessionaire picked up XECU in 1994 and moved it to 1450 kHz, with a power of 10 kW during the day and 1 kW at night, by way of two technical authorizations in 1997 and 1999.

In 2011, XECU migrated to FM as XHECU-FM 91.7.

In May 2016, Grupo Radio México exited Los Mochis and transferred operation of its stations to Grupo Radiorama. All of GRM's former stations transitioned to Radiorama formats, including XHECU, which had previously carried the La Z format. Grupo Radio Centro returned to Los Mochis in February 2019, but this station did not change formats, and La Z returned on XHCW-FM instead.
