= XHUAS-FM =

University radio station in Culiacán, Sinaloa, Mexico

XHUAS-FM/XEUAS-FM
- Culiacán, Sinaloa; Mexico
- Frequencies: 1150 kHz; 96.1 MHz
- Branding: Radio UAS

Programming
- Format: Mexican college

Ownership
- Owner: Universidad Autónoma de Sinaloa

History
- First air date: October 8, 1971 (AM); May 18, 1997 (FM)
- Former frequencies: 1330 kHz (1971-88)
- Call sign meaning: Universidad Autónoma de Sinaloa

Technical information
- Licensing authority: CRT
- Class: B (XEUAS-AM); C1 (XHUAS-FM); A (XHMSA-FM)
- Power: 10 kW day.125 kW night
- ERP: 60 kW (XHUAS-FM); 3 kW (XHMSA-FM)
- HAAT: 113.17 m (371.3 ft) (XHUAS-FM); 57 m (187 ft) (XHMSA-FM)

Links
- Website: www.radiouas.org

Radio UAS is the radio service of the Universidad Autónoma de Sinaloa. The station broadcasts on AM and FM frequencies, XEUAS-AM 1150 and XHUAS-FM 96.1, in the state capital of Culiacán, and on an FM radio station, XHMSA-FM 102.9, in Los Mochis.

== History ==
XEUAS-AM came on air for the first time on October 8, 1971, on 1330 kHz. In 1988, the station moved to 1150 kHz and increased its power from 1 kW day to 10 kW.

Sensing the need to move to FM for better sound quality and to be competitive, in 1997, the UAS opened an FM radio station as well, XHUAS-FM 96.1. In 2008, the station upgraded to 60 kW effective radiated power, making it the most powerful FM radio station in Sinaloa.

On December 19, 2017, the Federal Telecommunications Institute cleared a backlog of radio station applications in the Los Mochis area, one of them belonging to the UAS for an FM radio station there, given the callsign XHMSA-FM and the frequency of 102.9 MHz. Construction on the tower began on May 16, 2018, the 145th anniversary of the university's founding, and the station launched October 7, 2018, the 47th anniversary of XEUAS signing on. The Los Mochis station will broadcast with 3,000 watts, though it is capable of 10,000.
