= XHGVE-FM =

Radio station in Guasave, Sinaloa

- Guasave, Sinaloa; Mexico
- Frequency: 94.5 MHz
- Branding: La Interesante de Guasave

Programming
- Format: Regional Mexican

Ownership
- Owner: AP Grupo Radio; (Sinaloa, Arte y Gloria, A.C.)
- Sister stations: XHSIG-FM Los Mochis

History
- First air date: October 2016
- Call sign meaning: "Guasave"

Technical information
- Licensing authority: CRT
- Class: A
- ERP: 3,000 watts
- HAAT: 35.2 m (115 ft)
- Transmitter coordinates: 25°34′52.45″N 108°27′59.3″W

Links
- Website: lainteresante.com

XHGVE-FM is a noncommercial radio station on 94.5 FM in Guasave, Sinaloa, Mexico. It is owned by Sinaloa, Arte y Gloria, A.C., a non-profit owned by Román Padilla Fierro and Aldo Prandini (AP Grupo Radio), and known as La Interesante de Guasave.

== History ==
XHGVE received its concessions on November 11, 2015, and came to air in October 2016.
