= XHMMS-FM =

Radio station in Mazatlán, Sinaloa, Mexico

- Mazatlán, Sinaloa; Mexico
- Frequency: 97.9 MHz
- Branding: Globo

Programming
- Format: Romantic
- Affiliations: MVS Radio

Ownership
- Owner: Radiorama; (Radio Mil de Mazatlán, S.A. de C.V.)
- Operator: Grupo RSN

History
- First air date: April 10, 1987 (concession)

Technical information
- Licensing authority: CRT
- Class: B1
- ERP: 25 kW
- HAAT: 116.17 m (381.1 ft)
- Transmitter coordinates: 23°14′44″N 106°22′39″W

Links
- Webcast: tunein.com/radio/Fm-Globo-979-Mazatln-s238644
- Website: fmglobo.com/mazatlan

XHMMS-FM is a radio station on 97.9 FM in Mazatlán, Sinaloa, Mexico. It carries the Globo romantic format from MVS Radio.

== History ==
XEMMS-AM 1000 received its concession on April 10, 1987. The 1 kW daytimer was operated by Grupo ACIR and known as Radio ACIR before changing to an oldies format under its Radio Felicidad brand.

In 2009, MegaRadio began operating the station. Initially, it retained the oldies format under the name "Tu Recuerdo" (Your Memory), but the station soon became a franchise of the Ke buena Regional Mexican format from Televisa Radio.

It was authorized to move to FM in 2011. In early 2018, Ke Buena moved to XHST-FM 94.7, and XHMMS-FM became La Bestia Grupera.

RSN took over operation on March 30, 2020, with the FM Globo romantic format from MVS Radio.
