= XHGSE-FM =

Radio station in Guasave, Sinaloa, Mexico

- Guasave, Sinaloa; Mexico
- Frequency: 98.1 MHz
- Branding: Exa FM

Programming
- Format: Pop
- Affiliations: MVS Radio

Ownership
- Owner: RSN; (Grupo RSN de Guasave, S.A. de C.V.)
- Sister stations: XHEORO-FM

History
- First air date: June 29, 1990 (concession)
- Call sign meaning: GuaSavE

Technical information
- Licensing authority: CRT
- Class: A
- ERP: 3 kW
- HAAT: 79.7 m (261 ft)

Links
- Webcast: exafm.com

XHGSE-FM is a radio station on 98.1 FM in Guasave, Sinaloa, Mexico. It is owned by RSN and carries the Exa FM pop format from MVS Radio.

== History ==
XHGSE received its concession on June 29, 1990 y fue propiedad de Carlos Abdel Chávez López. The station broadcast grupera music under the name MaxiRadio in the 2000s.

In early 2011, the two stations in the Grupo Chávez Radio cluster were leased to Grupo Megamedios, which launched as "Máxima", broadcasting pop music on XHNW-FM in Culiacán.

On June 15, 2015, RSN took over operations and launched MVS Radio's Exa FM national format. In 2016, the transfer of the concession of RSN was completed.
