= XHTNT-FM =

Radio station in Los Mochis, Sinaloa

- Los Mochis, Sinaloa; Mexico
- Frequency: 100.5 MHz
- Branding: Radio 65

Programming
- Format: News/talk

Ownership
- Owner: Grupo Chávez Radio; (Radio 65, S.A.)
- Sister stations: XHMAX-FM

History
- First air date: November 24, 1967 (concession)
- Former call signs: XETNT-AM
- Former frequencies: 650 kHz, 106.5 MHz (2011–2018)

Technical information
- Licensing authority: CRT
- Class: B1
- ERP: 10 kW
- HAAT: 116.6 m (383 ft)
- Transmitter coordinates: 25°48′29″N 108°58′06″W

Links
- Website: grupochavezradio.com

XHTNT-FM is a radio station on 100.5 FM in Los Mochis, Sinaloa. It is owned by Grupo Chávez Radio and known as Radio 65 with a news/talk format.

== History ==
XETNT-AM 650 received its concession on November 24, 1967, immediately beginning broadcasting, with a formal inauguration on December 6. The 500-watt daytimer was owned by Óscar Pérez Escobosa but operated by Roque Chávez; it was transferred to Radio 65, S.A., in August 1985. In the 1990s, XETNT raised its power to 5 kW day and 1 kW night.

XETNT migrated to FM in 2011 as XHTNT-FM 106.5. As part of the 2017 renewal of XHTNT's concession, the station was required to move to 100.5 MHz in order to clear 106-108 MHz as much as possible for community and indigenous radio stations. The frequency change took place on October 2, 2018.

Radio 65 is one of three talk-formatted stations owned by Grupo Chávez Radio in Sinaloa: the others are XHJL-FM in Guamúchil and XHGS-FM in Guasave.
