= WBQO =

- Darien, Georgia; United States
- Frequency: 93.7 MHz
- Branding: 93.7 The Bridge

Programming
- Format: Adult album alternative

Ownership
- Owner: QBS Broadcasting, LLC

History
- First air date: 2015

Technical information
- Licensing authority: FCC
- Facility ID: 191581
- Class: C3
- ERP: 7,500 watts
- HAAT: 126.7 metres (416 ft)
- Transmitter coordinates: 31°11′39″N 81°29′30″W

Links
- Public license information: Public file; LMS
- Webcast: Listen Live
- Website: 937thebridge.com

WBQO (93.7 FM) is a radio station licensed to serve the community of Darien, Georgia. The station is owned by QBS Broadcasting, LLC, and airs an adult album alternative format.

The station was assigned the WBQO call letters by the Federal Communications Commission on June 8, 2015, serving St. Simons Island, Georgia.

WBQO was licensed to change its community of license from St. Simons Island to Darien effective December 21, 2022.

Previously carrying a news/talk format as "93.7 WBQO", the station flipped to its current adult album alternative format as "93.7 The Bridge" on April 3, 2023, launching with a self-described "5,000-something" song commercial free run; this was preceded by a stunt loop of "Puff the Magic Dragon".
