= XHFIL-FM =

Radio station in Mazatlán, Sinaloa, Mexico

- Mazatlán, Sinaloa; Mexico
- Frequency: 88.9 MHz
- Branding: Magia Digital

Programming
- Format: Regional Mexican

Ownership
- Owner: MegaRadio; (Radio XEFIL, S.A. de C.V.)

History
- First air date: June 30, 1960 (concession)

Technical information
- Licensing authority: CRT
- Class: B1
- ERP: 25 kW
- HAAT: 565.8 m (1,856 ft)
- Transmitter coordinates: 23°14′44″N 106°22′44″W

Links
- Webcast: Listen live
- Website: megaradio.mx

XHFIL-FM is a radio station on 88.9 FM in Mazatlán, Sinaloa. XHFIL is owned by MegaRadio and known as Magia Digital with a Regional Mexican format.

== History ==
XHFIL-FM logo from 2013 to 2016

XENH-AM 1590 received its concession on June 30, 1960. It was owned by Gerardo Millán Ríos and broadcast from Escuinapa with 1,000 watts day and 200 night. In one week in January 1986, XENH was authorized to become XEFIL-AM and to move to 870 kHz in Mazatlán. It was sold to the current concessionaire in 1994. For most of this time, it aired a Regional Mexican format under the Magia Digital name until May 2009, when Magia Digital was moved to XHVU-FM 97.1 and XEFIL began broadcasting a news/talk format "Radio Noticias 870".

XEFIL was moved to FM in 2010. In early 2012, Radiorama began operating the station and adopted the "W Radio" franchise from Televisa Radio; in 2013, the station switched a Regional Mexican format as La Sinaloense.

In May 2016, the station flipped to English classic hits as Éxtasis Digital, which had been on XHVU-FM, when MegaRadio resumed operating that station. MegaRadio reassumed operations of XHFIL in June 2017 and moved its Switch pop format from XHZS-FM 100.3. The Switch format ceased airing at the end of 2024.

In early 2025, the Magia Digital name and Regional Mexican format was recovered.
