= KZYY-LP =

Radio station in Tyler, Texas, United States

- Tyler, Texas; United States
- Broadcast area: Northern Tyler
- Frequency: 93.7 MHz
- Branding: Radio Esperanza 93.7

Programming
- Format: Spanish Religious

Ownership
- Owner: Iglesia de Dios Pentecostal; (Ministerio de Dios Pentecostal)

History
- First air date: March 2015

Technical information
- Licensing authority: FCC
- Facility ID: 194279
- Class: L1
- ERP: 61 watts
- HAAT: 39 meters (128 ft)
- Transmitter coordinates: 32°22′58.50″N 95°17′1.60″W

Links
- Public license information: LMS
- Webcast: Listen live
- Website: radioesperanza937fm.com

KZYY-LP is a Spanish language religious formatted broadcast radio station licensed to Tyler, Texas, USA. KZYY-LP serves the northern half, within the immediate City Limits of Tyler. It is owned and operated by Ministerio de Dios Pentecostal.

KZYY-LP's studio is located at 5763 Linwood Street, at the Iglesia de Dios Pentecostal, in the northeast section of Tyler.

== History ==
Iglesia de Dios Pentecostal, under its licensee Ministerio de Dios Pentecostal, received a construction permit to build a low power Class L1 FM radio station, licensed to Tyler, on February 3, 2015. The facility received a License to Cover from the Federal Communications Commission on March 16, 2015.

On February 4, 2019, KZYY-LP began broadcasting a program, "El Camino a la Vida Eterna" (or "The Road to Eternal Life"), a production of another Tyler-based Spanish church, Iglesia de Cristo en Greenbriar, on Mondays at 4pm.
