= XHUDO-FM =

Radio station of the Universidad Autónoma de Occidente in Los Mochis, Sinaloa

- Los Mochis, Sinaloa; Mexico
- Frequency: 89.3 FM
- Branding: Radio UAdeO

Programming
- Format: Mexican college

Ownership
- Owner: Universidad Autónoma de Occidente

History
- First air date: September 24, 1992
- Call sign meaning: Universidad de Occidente

Technical information
- Licensing authority: CRT
- Class: B1
- ERP: 14.63 kW
- HAAT: 132.8 m (436 ft)
- Transmitter coordinates: 25°47′28″N 108°59′36″W

Links
- Webcast: Listen live
- Website: uadeo.mx/radio

XHUDO-FM is a Mexican college radio station owned by the Universidad Autónoma de Occidente in Los Mochis, Sinaloa, Mexico.

== History ==
While the university had produced radio programs since 1984, the Universidad de Occidente, or U de O as it was known, sought to build its own radio station. It first received a permit for a station on 1040 kHz at Culiacán, which would have been XECUL-AM, but as the bulk of the university's students were located in Los Mochis, the school sought to move the unbuilt station permit to that city. It was not until September 24, 1992 that XEUDO-AM 820 took to the air. Early programming was difficult, as the station had little music to play, though it was initially a daytimer with programming from 6am to 8pm. In 1995, the programming schedule extended to 10pm.

XEUDO migrated to FM as XHUDO-FM 89.3 after receiving authorization to do so in 2011. The move allowed XHUDO to begin programming 24 hours a day.
