= XHMSL-FM =

Radio station in Los Mochis, Sinaloa, Mexico

- Los Mochis, Sinaloa; Mexico
- Broadcast area: Northern Sinaloa; Eastern Baja California; Southern Sonora
- Frequency: 101.3 MHz (HD Radio)
- Branding: Stereo Uno

Programming
- Format: Pop music in English and Spanish

Ownership
- Owner: Luz Network; (Radiodifusora XHMSL-FM, S.A. de C.V.)

History
- First air date: July 1, 1984
- Call sign meaning: Los Mochis, Sinaloa

Technical information
- Licensing authority: CRT
- Class: B
- ERP: 45,000 watts
- HAAT: 111.4 m (365 ft)
- Transmitter coordinates: 25°48′32″N 108°58′10″W

Links
- Webcast: Listen live (via TuneIn)
- Website: stereouno.fm www.luznoticias.mx Stereo Uno TV

XHMSL-FM is a radio station in Los Mochis, Sinaloa. It also serves Baja California Sur and the southern part of the state of Sonora. Broadcasting on 101.3 MHz, XHMSL is owned by Luz Network and known as Stereo Uno, carrying a pop music format in English and Spanish.

XHMSL broadcasts in HD Radio and carries three subchannels, Vintage (HD2), Siempre (HD3, changed from Luz before launch) and El Fuerte sister station XHPFRT-FM La Morrita (HD4). The HD2 and HD3 subchannels were authorized by the Federal Telecommunications Institute on June 6, 2018; the HD4 has no corresponding authorization.

== History ==
The station was launched on July 1, 1984, two days after obtaining its concession, making it the first FM station in the city. The original concessionaire was Sandra Luz Pérez Muñoz, part of the Pérez Muñoz family that owns Radiosistema del Noroeste. Its current format is a variety of Spanish and English pop music, and also local news.

In 2015, RSN sold the station to a new group known as Luz Network as part of a family split. Luz Network has since expanded the Stereo Uno brand to other cities in the state, with XHPNAS-FM in Navolato/Culiacán signing on in 2019 and XHZS-FM in Mazatlán being purchased the following year.
