= WTKB-FM =

- Atwood, Tennessee; United States
- Broadcast area: Milan, Tennessee
- Frequency: 93.7 MHz
- Branding: Victory 93.7

Programming
- Format: Contemporary Christian

Ownership
- Owner: Solid Rock Broadcasting, LLC

History
- Former call signs: WFOT (1989); WBVD (1989–1991)

Technical information
- Licensing authority: FCC
- Facility ID: 5299
- Class: C3
- ERP: 15,000 watts
- HAAT: 99.0 meters (324.8 ft)
- Transmitter coordinates: 35°57′25.00″N 88°41′44.00″W

Links
- Public license information: Public file; LMS
- Webcast: Listen Live
- Website: victory937.com

WTKB-FM (93.7 FM, "Victory 93.7") is a radio station broadcasting a contemporary Christian music format. Licensed to Atwood, Tennessee, United States, the station is currently owned by Solid Rock Broadcasting, LLC.
