= Universidad España =

Spanish Autonomous University of Durango
- Universidad Autónoma España de Durango
- Motto: En la Ciencia y la Espiritualidad está la Verdad
- Motto in English: Truth in Science and Spirituality
- Type: Private
- Established: 1994
- Rector: Juan Manuel Rodríguez y Rodríguez
- Location: Durango, Durango, Mexico
- Colors: Blue and white
- Mascot: Águilas Reales
- Website: unes.edu.mx

Universidad Autónoma España de Durango (Spanish Autonomous University of Durango) is a university in Durango, Durango, Mexico, founded in 1994. Branded as Universidad España (or UNES), the university has four additional branch campuses across three northern Mexican states.

== Campuses ==
UNES has five campuses:

- Universidad Autónoma España de Durango, Durango, Durango
- Universidad Autónoma España de Durango, Campus Guadalupe Victoria, Guadalupe Victoria, Durango
- Universidad Autónoma España de Durango, Campus Vicente Guerrero, Vicente Guerrero, Durango
- Universidad Autónoma España de Durango, Campus Parral, Hidalgo del Parral, Chihuahua
- Instituto Universidad España de Coahuila, Saltillo, Coahuila

== Media ==
UNES operates an FM radio and a television station, both in Durango. XHUNES-FM transmits on 92.9 FM and signed on in 2005, while XHUNES-TV channel 28, branded as España TV 28, was the first university television station in the state, signing on in 2008.
