= XHJL-FM =

Radio station in Guamúchil, Sinaloa, Mexico

- Guamúchil, Sinaloa; Mexico
- Frequency: 99.3 FM
- Branding: La JL

Programming
- Format: Regional Mexican and News/talk

Ownership
- Owner: Grupo Chávez Radio; (Guasigua Radio, S.A. de C.V.)
- Sister stations: XHGML-FM

History
- First air date: December 20, 1958 (concession)
- Former call signs: XEJL-AM
- Former frequencies: 1400 kHz, 1300 kHz

Technical information
- Licensing authority: CRT
- Class: B1
- ERP: 14.06 kW
- HAAT: 42.68 m (140.0 ft)
- Transmitter coordinates: 25°28′14″N 108°06′08″W

Links
- Webcast: Listen live
- Website: grupochavezradio.com

XHJL-FM is a radio station on 99.3 FM in Guamúchil, Sinaloa. It is owned by Grupo Chávez Radio and known as La JL with a Regional Mexican and news/talk format.

== History ==
XEJL-AM 1400 received its concession on December 20, 1958. The 1,000-watt station, which by the 1960s was broadcasting on 1300 kHz, was owned by Francisco Bartolo Meza.

XEJL migrated to FM in 2011 as XHJL-FM 99.3.

La JL is one of three talk-formatted stations owned by Grupo Chávez Radio in Sinaloa: the others are XHTNT-FM in Los Mochis and XHGS-FM in Guasave.
