= XHSIG-FM =

Radio station in Los Mochis, Sinaloa, Mexico

- Los Mochis, Sinaloa; Mexico
- Frequency: 88.5 FM
- Branding: La Interesante de Los Mochis

Programming
- Format: Regional Mexican

Ownership
- Owner: AP Grupo Radio; (Sinaloa, Arte y Gloria, A.C.)
- Sister stations: XHGVE-FM Guasave

History
- First air date: September 2018
- Call sign meaning: From the name of the concessionaire

Technical information
- Licensing authority: CRT
- Class: A
- ERP: 3,000 watts
- HAAT: 41.6 m (136 ft)
- Transmitter coordinates: 25°48′16.82″N 108°59′22.39″W

Links
- Website: lainteresante.com

XHSIG-FM is a noncommercial radio station on 88.5 FM in Los Mochis, Sinaloa, Mexico. It is owned by Sinaloa, Arte y Gloria, A.C. and known as La Interesante de Los Mochis.

== History ==
XHSIG was approved on December 19, 2017, as part of the IFT clearing a backlog of radio station applications in Los Mochis; it signed on air in September 2018, joining XHGVE-FM 94.5, which had been built two years earlier. The concessionaire was owned by Román Padilla Fierro—a former Institutional Revolutionary Party deputy for Sinaloa's first district, including the town of El Fuerte, and one-time secretary general of STIRT, the union representing broadcasting workers in Mexico—and Aldo Prandini.
