= XHPNK-FM =

Radio station in Los Mochis, Sinaloa, Mexico

- Los Mochis, Sinaloa; Mexico
- Broadcast area: Northern Sinaloa; Eastern Baja California; Southern Sonora
- Frequency: 103.5 FM
- Branding: Radio Variedades

Programming
- Format: Spanish adult hits

Ownership
- Owner: Grupo Radio Centro; (Radio y Televisión de Sinaloa, S.A. de C.V.)
- Sister stations: XHECU-FM, XHCW-FM, XHORF-FM

History
- First air date: November 19, 1980 (concession)
- Former call signs: XEPNK-AM
- Former frequencies: 880 kHz

Technical information
- ERP: 25 kW
- Transmitter coordinates: 25°45′40.76″N 109°00′00″W

Links
- Webcast: Listen live

XHPNK-FM is a radio station on 103.5 FM in Los Mochis, Sinaloa. It also serves Baja California Sur and the southern part of the state of Sonora. It is owned by Grupo Radio Centro and is known as Radio Variedades with a Spanish-language adult hits format.

== History ==
XEPNK-AM 880 received its concession on November 19, 1980. The 5,000-watt daytimer was owned by Felipe García de León. In the mid-1980s, García de León traded XEPNK to Grupo OIR in exchange for XEOS and XEHX radio in Ciudad Obregón, Sonora. The concession transferred to Radio y Televisión de Sinaloa in 1993, around which time XEPNK boosted its power to 10,000 watts during the day and 2,000 at night.

In 2011, XEPNK migrated to FM as XHPNK-FM 103.5.

In 2016, after Grupo Radio México transferred operational control of the station to Grupo Radiorama, XHPNK changed names from La Rancherita to Romántica as part of a frequency shuffle of formats at the cluster. GRC, GRM's successor, resumed operating the stations in February 2019, with XHPNK becoming Radio Variedades, the former name of XHCW-FM 96.5.

On March 10, 2021, the Federal Telecommunications Institute denied an application for the renewal of XHPNK-FM's concession for failure to pay the final installment of its fee to migrate to FM.
