= XHMAX-FM =

Radio station in Los Mochis, Sinaloa, Mexico

- Los Mochis, Sinaloa; Mexico
- Frequency: 102.5 MHz
- Branding: La Maxi

Programming
- Format: Regional Mexican

Ownership
- Owner: Grupo Chávez Radio; (Roque de Jesús Chávez López)
- Sister stations: XHTNT-FM

History
- First air date: August 6, 1993 (concession)
- Call sign meaning: "Maxi Radio", former and current name

Technical information
- Licensing authority: CRT
- Class: B
- ERP: 25 kW
- HAAT: 185.75 m (609.4 ft)

Links
- Webcast: Listen live
- Website: grupochavezradio.com

XHMAX-FM is a radio station on 102.5 FM in Los Mochis, Sinaloa. It is owned by Grupo Chávez Radio and carries a Regional Mexican format known as La Maxi.

== History ==
XHMCS-FM received its concession on August 6, 1993, being the second FM station in Los Mochis after XHMSL-FM signed in 1984. It changed its call sign to XHMAX when it became known as Maxi Radio.

The station became an affiliate of the Ke Buena franchise in 2008, which lasted until August 2021 when Grupo Chávez Radio terminated its agreement with Radiópolis and entirely dropped the Los 40 and Ke Buena franchises from its stations.
