= XHPFRT-FM =

Radio station in El Fuerte, Sinaloa, Mexico

- El Fuerte, Sinaloa; Mexico
- Frequency: 95.3 FM
- Branding: La Morrita

Programming
- Format: Regional Mexican

Ownership
- Owner: Luz Network; (Energía Radial en Comunicación, S.A. de C.V.)
- Sister stations: XHMSL-FM (Los Mochis)

History
- First air date: January 2019
- Call sign meaning: El Fuerte

Technical information
- Licensing authority: CRT
- Class: AA
- ERP: 6 kW
- HAAT: −1.6 m (−5.2 ft)
- Transmitter coordinates: 26°25′14″N 108°37′11″W

Links
- Webcast: Listen live
- Website: luznoticias.mx

XHPFRT-FM is a radio station on 95.3 FM in El Fuerte, Sinaloa. It is owned by Luz Network and known as La Morrita, carrying a Regional Mexican format.

== History ==
XHPFRT was awarded in the IFT-4 radio auction of 2017 and officially signed on in January 2019. The station's launch returned local radio to El Fuerte after a 34-year absence. The prior local station in El Fuerte, XEORF, relocated its studios to Los Mochis in 1985, though the transmitter remained in El Fuerte.
