= XHCSI-FM =

Radio station in Culiacán, Sinaloa

- Culiacán, Sinaloa; Mexico
- Frequency: 89.5 MHz
- Branding: Romántica

Programming
- Format: Romantic

Ownership
- Owner: Grupo Radiorama; (XECSI-AM, S.A. de C.V.)
- Operator: TM Medios y Radio S.A. de C.V.
- Sister stations: XHIN-FM

History
- First air date: March 15, 1991 (concession)
- Former call signs: XECSI-AM
- Former frequencies: 750 kHz (1991–2023),
- Call sign meaning: "Culiacán, Sinaloa"

Technical information
- Licensing authority: CRT
- Class: B1
- ERP: 25 kWs
- HAAT: 35.59 meters (116.8 ft)
- Transmitter coordinates: 24°50′43″N 107°24′58″W

Links
- Webcast: Listen live
- Website: tmmedios.com

XHCSI-FM 89.5 is a radio station in Culiacán, Sinaloa, Mexico. It broadcasts on 89.5 FM, XHCSI-FM is owned by Grupo Radiorama and operated by TM Medios y Radio S.A. de C.V. and is known as Romántica with a romantic format.

== History ==
XECSI-AM 750 received its concession on March 15, 1991. It operated with 1,000 watts during the day and at night with 250 watts. XECSI migrated to FM in 2010 as XHCSI-FM 89.5. The station had a continuity obligation decreed in 2014, but a 2018 IFT study found that other stations served all of the listeners that were in its AM coverage area.

XHCSI-FM was known as Éxtasis Digital between 2012 and 2015, with an English classic hits format. It then switched to its current romantic format.
