= Lobos FM =

Radio network owned by the Universidad Autónoma de Durango

- Country: Mexico
- Broadcast area: Seven western Mexican cities
- Branding: Lobos FM

Ownership
- Owner: Universidad Autónoma de Durango (Fomento Educativo y Cultural Francisco de Ibarra, A.C.)

History
- Founded: December 10, 1999

Links
- Website: lobosfm.com

Lobos FM is a network of radio stations owned by the Universidad Autónoma de Durango (known in the state of Sonora as the Universidad Durango Santander), a private university with campuses in multiple Mexican states. The seven Lobos FM stations cover cities in western Mexico and broadcast from the UAD campuses in each city. With Lobos FM, the UAD is the only multi-state private university broadcaster in the country.

== History ==
The first UAD radio station was XHUAD-FM 94.1 Durango, which was permitted on December 10, 1999. In 2004, the UAD applied for additional stations at Mazatlán and Zacatecas; in 2009 for Gómez Palacio, Los Mochis and Culiacán; and 2011 for Zacatecas. In September 2011, Cofetel approved the first expansion of the Lobos FM network by approving the permit applications in Gómez Palacio and Mazatlán, with XHLUAD-FM 88.7 and XHTLAN-FM 106.7 signing on in 2012. On December 19, 2017, the IFT resolved all remaining permit applications in Hermosillo, Los Mochis and Zacatecas, resulting in the university receiving concessions for XHHMO-FM 103.5, XHHIS-FM 97.3 and XHZTZ-FM 95.5. In Zacatecas, XHZTZ's award marked the state's first university radio station. The Culiacán application was greenlit on January 31, 2018, for XHCUAD-FM 93.7.

The UAD also owns and operates television station XHUAD-TDT channel 4 in Durango.

== Lobos FM stations ==
The Universidad Autónoma de Durango, legally incorporated as Fomento Educativo y Cultural Francisco de Ibarra, A.C., owns seven radio stations:

Callsign	Frequency	City	Class	ERP	HAAT	Coordinates
XHUAD-FM	94.1	Durango	A	3 kW	100 m (330 ft)	24°2′57.2″N 104°37′48.8″W
XHLUAD-FM	88.7	Gómez Palacio, Durango	A	1 kW	−10.9 m (−36 ft)	25°36′16.4″N 103°27′29.4″W
XHCUAD-FM	93.7	Culiacán, Sinaloa	A	3,000 kW	24.6 m (81 ft)	
XHZTZ-FM	95.5	Zacatecas, Zacatecas	A	2 kW	79.5 m (261 ft)	
XHHIS-FM	97.3	Los Mochis, Sinaloa	A	3 kW	154.7 m (508 ft)	
XHHMO-FM	103.5	Hermosillo, Sonora	A	0.130 kW	240.2 m (788 ft)	
XHTLAN-FM	91.7	Mazatlán, Sinaloa	A	3 kW	−13 m (−43 ft)	23°14′48.2″N 106°26′4.2″W
