= WYAH-LP =

Winchester, Kentucky; United States
- Frequency: 93.7 MHz

Programming
- Format: Defunct (was religious)

Ownership
- Owner: Franklin Avenue Church of the Living God, Inc.

Technical information
- Licensing authority: FCC
- Facility ID: 135462
- Class: L1
- ERP: 29 watts
- HAAT: 54.6 meters
- Transmitter coordinates: 37°59′36.00″N 84°10′38.00″W

Links
- Public license information: LMS

WYAH-LP (93.7 FM) was a radio station licensed to Winchester, Kentucky, United States. The station was owned by Franklin Avenue Church of the Living God, Inc.
