= XHIN-FM =

Radio station in Culiacán, Sinaloa

- Culiacán, Sinaloa; Mexico
- Frequency: 95.3 FM
- Branding: La Plakosa

Programming
- Format: Regional Mexican

Ownership
- Owner: Grupo Radiorama; (XHIN-FM, S.A. de C.V.)
- Operator: TM Medios y Radio, S.A. de C.V.
- Sister stations: XHCSI-FM

History
- First air date: November 28, 1988 (concession)

Technical information
- Licensing authority: CRT
- Class: B1
- ERP: 12.81 kW
- HAAT: 41.16 m (135.0 ft)

Links
- Webcast: Listen live
- Website: tmmedios.com

XHIN-FM is a radio station on 95.3 FM in Culiacán, Sinaloa. It is owned by Grupo Radiorama and operated by TM Medios y Radio, S.A. de C.V., and is known as La Plakosa, which offers a Regional Mexican format.

== History ==
XHIN received its concession on November 28, 1988. It was originally known as Arroba FM with a pop music format in English and Spanish, until its rebranding as La Plakosa in 2022.
