= XHVU-FM =

Radio station in Mazatlán, Sinaloa

- Mazatlán, Sinaloa; Mexico
- Frequency: 97.1 MHz
- Branding: La Morrita

Programming
- Format: Regional Mexican

Ownership
- Owner: Luz Network; (Neo Radio Medios y Comunicación, S.A. de C.V.)
- Sister stations: XHZS-FM

History
- First air date: February 18, 1977; 1994 (FM)
- Last air date: 2017 (AM)
- Former frequencies: 720 kHz (1977–2017)

Technical information
- Licensing authority: CRT
- Class: B1
- ERP: 15 kW
- HAAT: 56.8 m (186 ft)

Links
- Webcast: https://audiostreaming.luz.network/stream/11/;?

XHVU-FM 97.1 is a radio station in Mazatlán, Sinaloa. It is owned by Luz Network and carries its La Morrita Regional Mexican format.

== History ==
XEVU-AM 720 received its first concession in February 1977. It broadcast with 1,000 watts during the day and 500 at night. XEVU became a combo in 1994.

It was previously known as "La Poderosa" with a Regional Mexican format until 2005, when it became a franchise Ke Buena format. In May 2009, it became "Magia Digital" a Regional Mexican format that previously broadcast on XEFIL-AM, this lasted until early 2012 when Radiorama began operating with an English classic hits format as "Éxtasis Digital". In May 2016, XHVU returned to Magia Digital when MegaRadio resumed the operation of the station.

On June 1, 2017, Radio XEVU, S.A. de C.V., presented the Federal Telecommunications Institute with the formal surrender of its AM operations. In 2023, MegaRadio transferred the station's concession to a Luz Network subsidiary, Neo Radio Medios y Comunicación; eventually becoming the La Morrita Regional Mexican format already used on Luz-owned stations in Sinaloa.
