= XHMIL-FM =

Radio station in Los Mochis, Sinaloa, Mexico

- Los Mochis, Sinaloa; Mexico
- Frequency: 90.1 MHz
- Branding: Ke Buena

Programming
- Format: Regional Mexican
- Affiliations: Radiópolis

Ownership
- Owner: Radiorama/Promomedios; (Radio Mil Sinaloense, S.A. de C.V.)
- Operator: Grupo Promomedios

History
- First air date: July 18, 1984 (concession)
- Former frequencies: 1000 kHz
- Call sign meaning: "Mil", Spanish for "thousand": AM station broadcast on 1000 kHz

Technical information
- ERP: 25 kW
- Transmitter coordinates: 25°49′02″N 109°00′53″W

Links
- Website: gpmtuportal.com

XHMIL-FM is a radio station on 90.1 FM in Los Mochis, Sinaloa. It is owned by Grupo Radiorama, jointly operated with Grupo Promomedios and carries the Ke Buena Regional Mexican format brand from Radiópolis.

== History ==
XEMIL-AM 1000 received its concession on July 18, 1984. It migrated to FM in 2010 as XHMIL-FM on 90.1.

In 2012, it flipped from its original Planeta pop music format to Romántica with a Spanish-language adult hits format. In 2014, Grupo Radiorama and Promomedios Sinaloa began joint operations of Radiorama's cluster in Los Mochis; XHMIL changed formats to Regional Mexican as La Nueva.

On September 10, 2021, the Ke Buena national format from Radiópolis, previously on XHMAX-FM 102.5, was moved to XHMIL after Grupo Chávez Radio dropped the Radiópolis brands from its stations.
