= XHGES-FM =

Public radio station in Sinaloa, Mexico

- Culiacán; Mexico
- Broadcast area: Sinaloa
- Frequency: 94.5 FM
- Branding: Radio Sinaloa

Programming
- Format: Public radio

Ownership
- Owner: Government of the State of Sinaloa

History
- First air date: October 6, 2006
- Call sign meaning: Gobierno del Estado de Sinaloa

Technical information
- Licensing authority: CRT
- Class: A
- ERP: 2.35 kW
- HAAT: 74.5 m (244 ft)
- Transmitter coordinates: 24°47′24″N 107°26′39″W
- Repeaters: XHLMS-FM 92.5 Los Mochis; XHMZS-FM 93.9 Mazatlán

Links
- Website: radiosinaloa.mx

Radio Sinaloa is the radio station of the government of the Mexican state of Sinaloa. It broadcasts on transmitters in Culiacán, Los Mochis and Mazatlán and carries a public radio format.

== History ==
Radio Sinaloa went into operation on October 6, 2006.

== Transmitters ==
Callsign	Frequency	City	Class	ERP	HAAT
XHGES-FM	94.5	Culiacán	A	2.35 kW	44.16 m
XHLMS-FM	92.5	Los Mochis	B1	9.12 kW	43.18 m
XHMZS-FM	93.9	Mazatlán	B1	9.17 kW	25.17 m
