= XHWT-FM =

Radio station in Culiacán, Sinaloa, Mexico

Defunct
- Culiacán, Sinaloa; Mexico
- Frequency: 97.7 FM

Programming
- Format: Silent

Ownership
- Owner: Radio TV México; (Radio Unido, S.A.)
- Sister stations: XHBL-FM

History
- First air date: November 28, 1988 (concession)
- Last air date: December 31, 2025
- Former call signs: XEWT-AM
- Former frequencies: 1200 AM

Technical information
- ERP: 25 kW
- Transmitter coordinates: 24°49′39″N 107°24′16″W

XHWT-FM was a radio station on 97.7 FM in Culiacán, Sinaloa, Mexico. The station last aired the W Radio with a talk format from Radiópolis.

== History ==
XEWT-AM 1200 received its concession on November 28, 1988. It operated as a 1,000-watt daytimer, later broadcasting at night with 250 watts.

XEWT migrated to FM in 2010 as XHWT-FM 97.7.

The concession for XHWT-FM expired with an untimely renewal after October 3, 2016. The station ceased broadcasting on December 31, 2025.
