= XHNW-FM =

Radio station in Culiacán, Sinaloa, Mexico

- Culiacán, Sinaloa; Mexico
- Frequency: 103.3 FM
- Branding: Maxiradio

Programming
- Format: Pop

Ownership
- Owner: Corporativo Megamedios; (Mega Frecuencia, S.A. de C.V.)

History
- First air date: June 8, 1957; 1994 (FM)

Technical information
- Licensing authority: CRT
- Class: B1
- ERP: 10 kW
- HAAT: 25.93 m (85.1 ft)

Links
- Website: maxiradio.mx

XHNW-FM 103.3 is a radio station in Culiacán, Sinaloa, Mexico. It carries a pop format known as Maxiradio and is owned by Corporativo Megamedios.

== History ==
Logo as Máxima, prior to the name change to Maxiradio

XENW-AM 860 received its first concession on June 6, 1957, and took to the air two days later. It was owned by Héctor Ramos Rojo until it was transferred to Ilda Dolores Ortiz Palomares in 2000, two years after Héctor's death. The station became an AM-FM combo in 1994.

In 2007, the station was transferred from Ilda Dolores Ortiz Palomares to Megamedios, which is owned 90% by Ortiz Palomares and 10% by Arturo Ramos Ortiz.

In 2017, Megamedios surrendered the AM frequency after sixty years of operations.
