= Universidad Autónoma de Asunción (university) =

Paraguayan university

Coordinates: 25°17′14.49″S 57°38′34.92″W

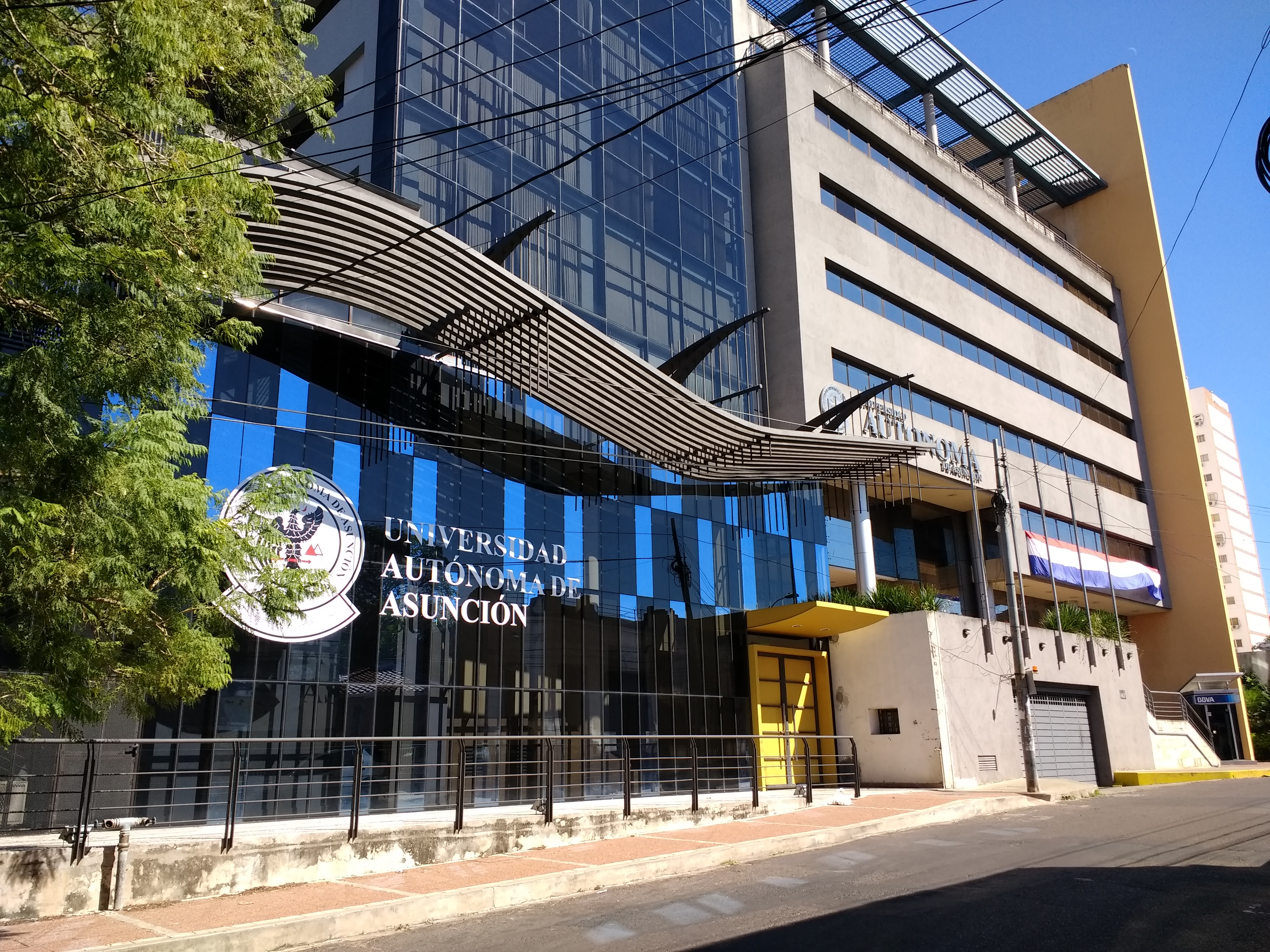

The Universidad Autónoma de Asunción (lit. 'Autonomous University of Asunción') is a private university in Asunción, Paraguay. It was founded in 1978 (47 years ago) as the Escuela Superior de Administración de Empresas (Superior School of Business Administration); it obtained its title of university in 1991 (34 years ago). As of 2006, it has 5000 students (undergraduate and graduate) and 350 professors.

The university comprises five colleges:

- College of Economic Sciences and Administration
- College of Health Sciences
- College of Humanistic Sciences and Communication
- College of Law, Political and Social Sciences
- College of Science and Technology
