= Universidad Autónoma de Occidente (Mexico) =

Public university in Sinaloa, Mexico

Autonomous University of the West
- Universidad Autónoma de Occidente
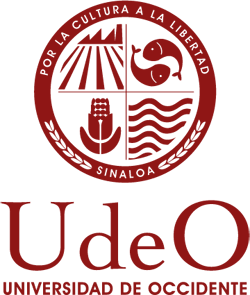
- Former names: Centro de Estudios Superiores de Occidente; Universidad de Occidente
- Motto: Por la Cultura a la Libertad
- Motto in English: For the Culture of Liberty
- Type: Public
- Established: January 10, 1974
- Rector: Sylvia Paz Díaz Camacho
- Location: Los Mochis, Sinaloa, Mexico; 25°48′50″N 108°57′43″W
- Colours: Red and beige
- Mascot: Linces
- Website: uadeo.mx

The Universidad Autónoma de Occidente ("Autonomous University of the West" or UAdeO) is a public institution of higher education in the state of Sinaloa. Its main campus is located in Los Mochis, with units in Culiacán, El Fuerte, Guamúchil, Guasave and Mazatlán and extension centers at El Rosario and Escuinapa.

== History ==
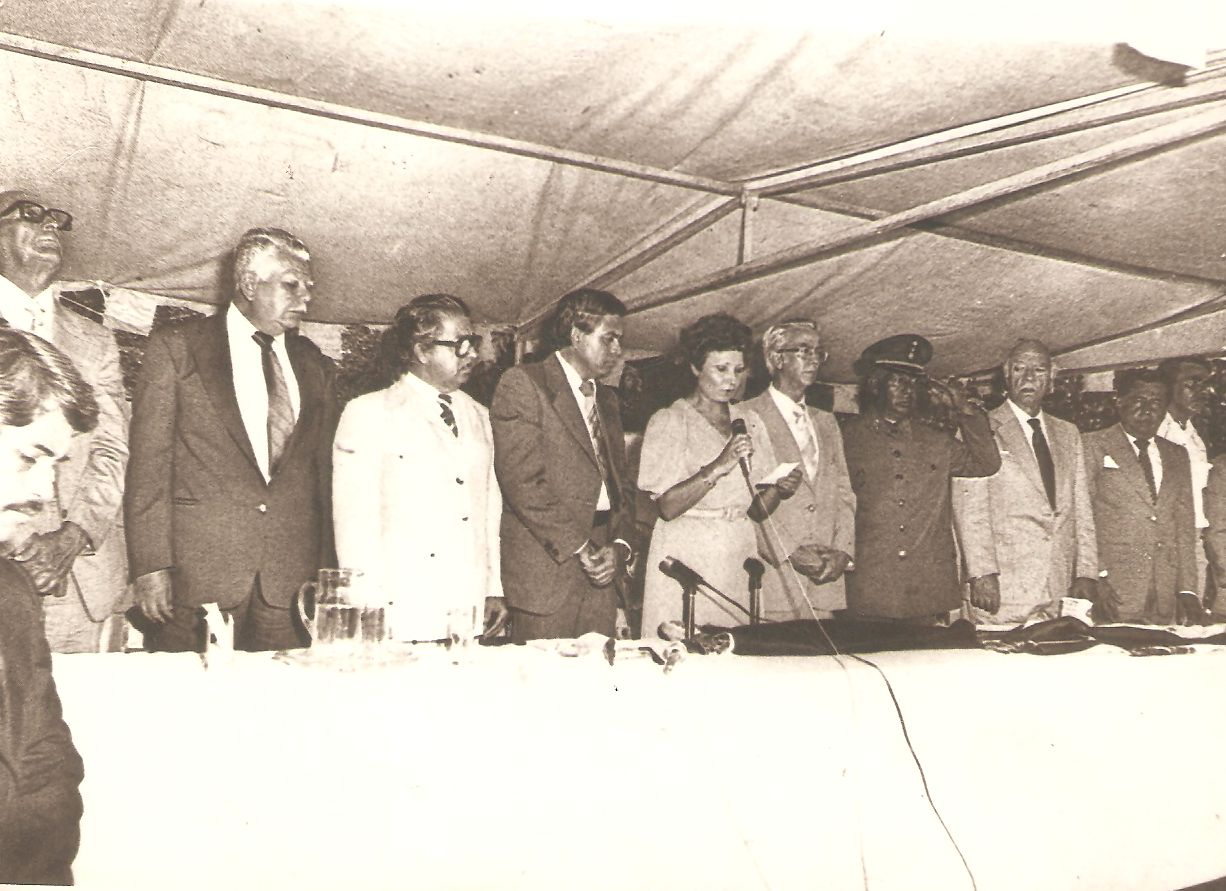
Inauguration of the U de O

The first incarnation of the university was founded on January 10, 1974, as the Centro de Estudios Superiores de Occidente (Western Center of Higher Studies or CESO). In 1979, the Basic School of Engineering, located in Culiacán, began operations; a month later, the School of Agricultural Administration opened in Los Mochis. That year, the CESO agreed to propose to the SEP the name Universidad de Occidente. In 1980, work began to restructure the CESO along university lines under the leadership of Dr. Julio Ibarra Urrea, who had previously been the rector of the Universidad Autónoma de Sinaloa in the mid-1960s when it obtained its autonomy.

On February 24, 1982, CESO formally became the Universidad de Occidente. It was the second institution to take the name, after the original Universidad de Occidente, which existed from 1918 to 1922 in Culiacán. The succeeding decade saw several important milestones of university development, most notably the 1986 completion of the U de O campus in Los Mochis, known as Ciudad Universitaria (University City). In 1992, after years of planning and a change of location from Culiacán, XEUDO-AM 820, the university's radio station, signed on for the first time; it would move to FM in 2011.

On January 25, 2018, Sinaloa's state legislature unanimously approved a new organic law that gave the university autonomy and consequently changed its name to Universidad Autónoma de Occidente. The corresponding decree was published in the Sinaloa state gazette on February 21, 2018, making the UAdeO Sinaloa's second autonomous state university.

== Educational programs ==
The UAdeO offers 18 undergraduate degrees, as well as six master's and three doctoral programs.
