= XHMAT-FM =

Radio station in Mazatlán, Sinaloa, Mexico

- Mazatlán, Sinaloa; Mexico
- Frequency: 99.5 MHz
- Branding: Vibra Radio

Programming
- Format: Regional Mexican

Ownership
- Owner: Roque Mascareño Chávez; (Red Empresarial Total, S.A. de C.V.)

History
- First air date: November 22, 1979 (concession)
- Call sign meaning: "Mazatlán"

Technical information
- Licensing authority: CRT
- Class: B1
- ERP: 14.1 kW
- HAAT: 128.5 m (422 ft)

Links
- Webcast: https://radioenvivo.com.mx/1148-vibra-radio-fm.html
- Website: www.vibra.red

XHMAT-FM is a radio station on 99.5 FM in Mazatlán, Sinaloa, Mexico, known as Vibra Radio with a Regional Mexican format.

== History ==
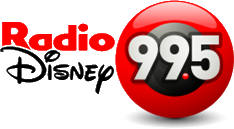
Logo as Radio Disney, used from March 17, 2014 to December 25, 2019

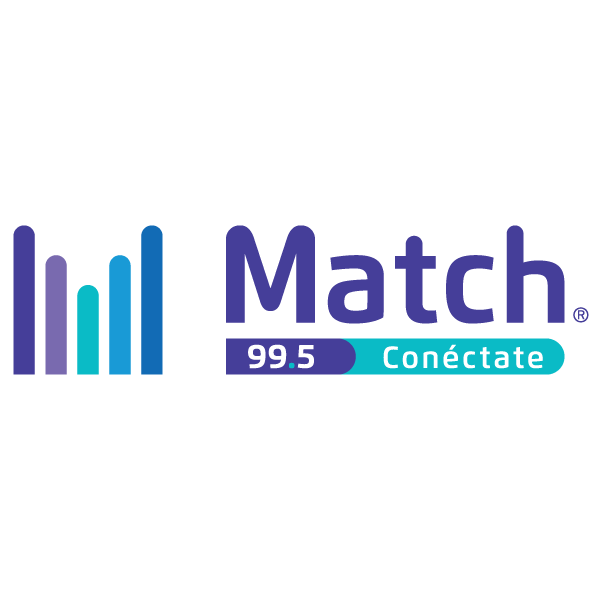
Logo as Match, used from December 25, 2019 to June 9, 2021

XHMAT-FM received its concession on November 22, 1979. It was originally owned by Indalecio Mojica Uriostegui.

=== Match ===
On December 25, 2019, Disney and ACIR announced they were mutually ending their relationship, which had covered twelve Mexican cities. Ten of the twelve Radio Disney stations, including XHMAT, were transitioned to ACIR's replacement pop format, Match.

=== Vibra Radio ===
On June 9, 2021, XHMAT-FM and its sister station in Culiacán, XHVQ-FM 96.9, withdrew from Grupo ACIR, changing to Vibra Radio on June 22, 2021. Red Empresarial Total, S.A. de C.V., then acquired them in 2022.

In January 2023, the Vibra pop format was replaced outside the Culiacán area with a Regional Mexican format.
