= XHVQ-FM =

Radio station in Culiacán, Sinaloa, Mexico

- Culiacán, Sinaloa; Mexico
- Frequency: 96.9 MHz
- Branding: Vibra Radio

Programming
- Format: Regional Mexican

Ownership
- Owner: Vibra Radio; (Radio XHVQ, S. de R.L. de C.V.)

History
- First air date: May 15, 1964 (AM); June 2012 (FM)
- Former call signs: XENP-AM, XENSM-AM, XEVQ-AM

Technical information
- Licensing authority: CRT
- Class: B1
- ERP: 25 kWs
- HAAT: 57.9 m (190 ft)
- Transmitter coordinates: 24°49′56″N 107°24′17″W

Links
- Webcast: Listen live
- Website: vibra.red

XHVQ-FM is a radio station on 96.9 FM in Culiacán, Sinaloa. It is known as Vibra Radio and carries a Regional Mexican format.

== History ==
Logo as Amor used from 2017 to 2021

XENP-AM 830—also known as XENSM—received its concession on May 15, 1964. It was originally located in Navolato and owned by Salvador Águilar Montenegro, whose family owned several local gas stations, operating as a 1,000-watt daytimer. Within several years, the call sign was changed to XEVQ-AM, and station operations were moved to Culiacán. By the 1980s, XEVQ was owned by Radio y Televisión del Noroeste and operating with 5,000 watts. In the 2000s, it added 1,000 watts at night. For many years, it was known as "La Grande de Sinaloa", airing for some local formats.

XEVQ was approved to migrate to FM in 2011 as XHVQ-FM 96.9 and came to air in June 2012, flipping to a Spanish-language romantic music format using the Amor brand from Grupo ACIR. In June 2021, XHVQ-FM and its sister station in Mazatlán, XHMAT-FM 99.5, withdrew from Grupo ACIR, changing to Vibra Radio on June 22, 2021. The stations' parent companies were then sold.

As of January 2023, Vibra was the only radio station to be changed from romantic music to a Regional Mexican format, all other Vibra owned stations in the city all aired their Regional Mexican format prior to XHVQ changing from the romantic music format.
