= XHZS-FM (Sinaloa) =

Radio station in Mazatlán, Sinaloa

- Mazatlán, Sinaloa; Mexico
- Frequency: 100.3 MHz (HD Radio)
- Branding: Stereo Uno

Programming
- Format: Pop music in English and Spanish

Ownership
- Owner: Luz Network; (Radio XHZS-FM, S.A. de C.V.)
- Sister stations: XHVU-FM

History
- First air date: August 25, 1987 (concession)

Technical information
- Licensing authority: CRT
- Class: B1
- ERP: 9,640 watts
- HAAT: 116.74 m (383.0 ft)
- Transmitter coordinates: 23°14′44″N 106°22′41″W

Links
- Webcast: https://radioenvivo.com.mx/1806-stereo-uno.html

XHZS-FM is a radio station in Mazatlán, Sinaloa. Broadcasting on 100.3 FM from a transmitter on Cerro El Caracol, XHZS is owned and operated by Luz Network and carries a pop music format in English and Spanish known as Stereo Uno.

== History ==
XHZS received its concession on August 25, 1987.

The station has had various formats, including the Estereo Vida brand until the mid-2000s, flipping to Planeta pop format. In early 2012, the station became the Los 40 Principales franchise format and in 2015, it became @FM pop brand.

In May 2016, XHZS flipped from Grupo Radiorama to MegaRadio affiliation and consequently changed names to Switch, as the former is a Radiorama-specific brand. The station reversed the change in June 2017.

On March 30, 2020, Luz Network assumed ownership and operation of the station and began programming its Stereo Uno pop format; this gives Luz Network a presence in all three major Sinaloa cities, as it owns stations in Los Mochis and Navolato–Culiacán. The Federal Telecommunications Institute approved XHZS-FM to begin broadcasting in HD Radio in 2022.
