= List of radio stations in Veracruz =

The Mexican state of Veracruz has the most CRT-licensed radio stations of any of the 32 states, with 107 FM stations and AM-FM combos, plus two unique AM stations, as of March 2016.

List of radio stations in Veracruz
Call sign	Frequency	Location	Owner	Name	Format
XEFU-AM	630	Cosamaloapan	Voz Amiga de la Cuenca del Papaloapan, S.A. de C.V.	La Voz Amiga	
XECSV-AM	1000	Coatzacoalcos	Radio Mil de Veracruz, S.A. de C.V.	Máxima	Contemporary hit radio
XEPR-AM	1020	Papantla de Olarte	Compañía Radiofónica de Poza Rica, S.A. de C.V.	Globo	Adult contemporary
XECSAN-AM	1040	Xalapa	Instituto Michoacano de Radiodifusión, A.C.	—N/a	—N/a
XETVR-AM	1150	Tuxpan	Radio Tuxpan, S.A. de C.V.	Vida Azul	Spanish adult contemporary
XEPP-AM	1190	Cuapichapan	Radio Espectáculo, S.A.	La Comadre	Regional Mexican
XEVREP-AM	1250	Veracruz	Escápate al Paraíso, S.A. de C.V.	Arre en Akustik	Regional Mexican
XECPAD-AM	1300	Xalapa	Universidad Veracruzana	Radio UV	University
XEZON-AM	1360	Zongolica	Instituto Nacional de los Pueblos Indígenas	La Voz de la Sierra de Zongolica	Indigenous radio
XEPREP-AM	1450	Poza Rica	Escápate al Paraíso, S.A. de C.V.	—N/a	—N/a
XEYTM-AM	1490	Teocelo	Asociación Veracruzana de Comunicadores Populares, A.C.	Radio Teocelo	Community radio
XHCCCR-FM	88.1	Tantoyuca	Gardom Media Group, S.A. de C.V.	El Viejón	Regional Mexican
XHAFQ-FM	88.5	Cosoleacaque	Radiodifusora XEAFQ-AM, S.A. de C.V.	La Súper Q	Contemporary hit radio
XHIL-FM	88.5	Veracruz	Radio XHIL, S. de R.L. de C.V.	Máxima FM	Contemporary hit radio
XHBE-FM	88.9	El Progreso	Raúl César y Luis Manuel Molina Ovando	La Invasora	Regional Mexican
XHAVR-FM	89.1	Alvarado	Transmisora Regional Radio Fórmula, S.A. de C.V.	Radio Fórmula	News/talk
XHRHV-FM	89.1	Chalma	La Chalmerita, A.C.	La Chalmerita	Community radio
XHRRR-FM	89.3	Papantla de Olarte	Radio Club, S.A. de C.V.	Arroba FM	Contemporary hit radio
XHFTI-FM	89.5	Fortin de las Flores	Radio Informativa, S.A. de C.V.	La Lupe	Spanish adult hits
XHID-FM	89.7	Álamo	Radio Comunicación de Álamo, S.A. de C.V.	La K-ñón	Regional Mexican
XHHU-FM	89.9	San Rafaelito	Radio Tropical, S.A. de C.V.	Los 40	Contemporary hit radio
XHLL-FM	90.1	Veracruz	Radio Jarocha, S.A.	Fusión	Adult contemporary
XHPEBC-FM	90.1	Coatzacoalcos	Jorge Luis Lucio Sánchez	La Morena FM	Regional Mexican
XHPAPA-FM	90.3	Papantla de Olarte	El Aprendizaje Es Para Todos, A.C.	La Voz del Totonacapan	Variety
XHTI-FM	90.5	Tempoal	Radiodifusión, S.A.	La Huasteca	Regional Mexican
XHRUV-FM	90.5	Xalapa	Universidad Veracruzana	Radio UV	University radio
XHALAM-FM	90.7	Álamo	El Aprendizaje Es Para Todos, A.C.	La Voz de la Huasteca	Variety
XHQO-FM	90.7	Cosamaloapan	Voz Amiga de la Cuenca del Papaloapan, S.A. de C.V.	Stereo Romance	Romantic
XHVER-FM	90.9	Veracruz	Simón Valanci Buzali	Bella Música	Adult contemporary
XHPT-FM	91.3	Córdoba	X.E.A.G, S.A.	Exa FM	Contemporary hit radio
XHPTAN-FM	91.3	Tantoyuca	Centrado Corporativo, S.A. de C.V.	Acustik Radio	Regional Mexican
XHTL-FM	91.5	Tuxpan	Calixto Almazán y Ferrer	La Ola	Contemporary hit radio
XHPAV-FM	91.7	Pueblo Viejo	XEPAV-AM, S.A. de C.V.	Fiesta Mexicana	Regional Mexican
XHOZ-FM	91.7	Xalapa	OZ Radio, S.A. de C.V.	Amor	Romantic
XHPG-FM	92.1	Córdoba	FMXHPG, S.A. de C.V.	La Mejor	Regional Mexican
XHZS-FM	92.3	Coatzacoalcos	Emisoras Mexicanas de Veracruz, S.A. de C.V.	Radio Hit, La Explosiva	Regional Mexican
XHTU-FM	92.3	Tuxpan	XHTU-FM, S.A. de C.V.	La Poderosa	Regional Mexican
XHQRV-FM	92.5	Veracruz	Radio Costera, S.A.	Imagen Radio	News/talk
XHSAV-FM	92.7	San Andrés Tuxtla	La Primerísima, S.A. de C.V.	La Primerísima	Regional Mexican
XHJH-FM	92.9	Xalapa	Radio Cañón, S.A. de C.V.	W Radio	News/talk
XHCRA-FM	93.1	Álamo	XHCRA-FM, S.A. de C.V.	La Poderosa	Regional Mexican
XHCSV-FM	93.1	Coatzacoalcos	Radio Mil de Veracruz, S.A. de C.V.	Máxima	Contemporary hit radio
XHPS-FM	93.3	Veracruz	Stereorey México, S.A.	Exa FM	Contemporary hit radio
XHCAT-FM	93.5	Catemaco	Toskitl, A.C.	—N/a	—N/a
XHPP-FM	93.5	Pánuco	XHPP-FM, S.A. de C.V.	Arroba FM	Contemporary hit radio
XHKL-FM	93.7	Xalapa	XEKL, S.A.	Magia 93.7	Oldies
XHTLAC-FM	93.7	Tlacotalpan	La Comunidad Unida Por Su Cultura, A.C.	Viva la Cuenca Radio	Variety
XHEVZ-FM	93.9	Acayucan	Radio la Veraz, S.A. de C.V.	La Ke Buena	Regional Mexican
XHTXA-FM	93.9	Tuxpan	Frecuencia Modulada de Tuxpam, S.A. de C.V.	Soy FM	Contemporary Hit Radio
XHHV-FM	94.1	Veracruz	Radio Heroica, S.A.	La Fiera	Regional Mexican
XHVO-FM	94.3	San Rafael	Radio X.E.V.O., S.A. de C.V.	La Mega	Regional Mexican
XHCCCQ-FM	94.3	Tamiahua	Alfredo Talip Rivera	La Maxima Grupera	Regional Mexican
XHYV-FM	94.5	Pueblo de Santa Leticia	Radio Variedades, S.A. de C.V.	El Patrón	Regional Mexican
XHPW-FM	94.7	Poza Rica	Radio XEPW, S.A. de C.V.	La Mejor	Regional Mexican
XHPTEA-FM	94.9	Acayucan	Arturo Ordaz Gallegos	Istmo	Contemporary hit radio
XHFM-FM	94.9	Veracruz	XEFM, S.A.	Fiesta	Contemporary hit radio
XHKM-FM	95.3	Minatitlán	Radio Mina, S.A.	Radio Mina	Contemporary hit radio
XHGN-FM	95.3	Piedras Negras	Radio Emisora Comercial XEGN, S.A.	La Gigante	Regional Mexican
XHTP-FM	95.5	Banderilla	José Luis Oliva Meza	Sensación	Contemporary hit radio
XHCCCO-FM	95.5	Potrero del Llano	Radio Cañón, S.A. de C.V.	La Ke Buena	Regional Mexican
XHSCGQ-FM	95.7	Boca del Río	La Deriva, A.C.	—N/a	—N/a
XHOTE-FM	95.7	Mecayapan	Gobierno del Estado de Veracruz	Radiomás	Public radio
XHSIC-FM	96.1	Córdoba	XHSIC, S.A. de C.V.	La Bestia Grupera	Regional Mexican
XHSIBM-FM	96.1	Ixhuatlán de Madero	Comunidad Indígena Nahua de Colatlán	—N/a	—N/a
XHSANR-FM	96.1	San Rafael	La Comunidad en Busca de la Cultura, A.C.	—N/a	—N/a
XHPOZ-FM	96.3	Poza Rica de Hidalgo	Corporación Enigma, A.C.	La Estación	Variety
XHRN-FM	96.5	Veracruz	Frecuencia Modulada Tropical, S.A. de C.V.	Más Latina	Tropical/Contemporary hit radio
XHBY-FM	96.7	Tuxpan	XEBY, S.A. de C.V.	Radio Lobo	Regional Mexican
XHTZ-FM	96.9	Xalapa	XHTZ-FM, S.A.	Joya 96.9	Spanish variety
XHGF-FM	97.3	Gutiérrez Zamora	Radio XEGF, S.A.	La Ley	Regional Mexican
XHOV-FM	97.3	Ixhuatlancillo	XEOV, S.A.	La Ke Buena	Regional Mexican
XHOT-FM	97.7	Xalapa	La Máquina Tropical, S.A.	La Máquina	Regional Mexican/tropical
XHUHV-FM	97.9	Chicontepec	Universidad Huasteca Veracruzana, S.C.	Radio CEU	University
XHTRES-FM	97.9	Tres Valles	Comunidad, Educación y Valores, A.C.	—N/a	—N/a
XHPSOT-FM	98.1	Soteapan, etc.	Mezkla FM, S.A. de C.V.	Mezkla FM	Contemporary hit radio
XHU-FM	98.1	Veracruz	Eco de Sotavento, S.A.	XEU	News/talk
XHRAF-FM	98.3	Rafael Delgado	Cultura Es Lo Nuestro, A.C.	Radio Banana	Variety
XHEOM-FM	98.5	Coatzacoalcos	Transmisora Regional Radio Fórmula, S.A. de C.V.	Radio Fórmula	News/talk
XHWA-FM	98.5	Xalapa	Frecuencia 98, S.A. de C.V.	Digital 98.5	English classic hits
XHWB-FM	98.9	Veracruz	Cadena Radiodifusora Mexicana, S.A. de C.V.	Los 40	Contemporary hit radio
XHEPT-FM	99.1	Misantla	Radio XEPT, S.A.	La Ke Buena	Regional Mexican
XHAFA-FM	99.3	Nanchital	Radiodifusora XEAFA-AM, S.A. de C.V.	La Lupe	Adult hits
XHORA-FM	99.3	Orizaba	PD Multimedios, S.A.	OriStereo	Regional Mexican
XHETU-FM	99.3	Pueblo Viejo	Impulsora Moderna del Radio, S.A. de C.V.	Vida Romántica	Romantic
XHTVR-FM	99.5	Tuxpan	Radio Tuxpan, S.A. de C.V.	Vida Azul	Adult contemporary
XHPB-FM	99.7	Veracruz	Frecuencia Modulada de Veracruz, S.A. de C.V.	Mar FM	English classic hits
XHCCCP-FM	99.9	Naranjos	Alfredo Talip Rivera	La Maxima Grupera	Regional Mexican
XHMBR-FM	100.1	Boca del Río	Radio Cultural Monver, A.C.	—N/a	—N/a
XHNE-FM	100.1	Coatzacoalcos	Coatza Top, S.A. de C.V.	Los 40	Contemporary hit radio
XHXK-FM	100.1	Poza Rica	Transmisora Regional Radio Fórmula, S.A. de C.V.	Radio Fórmula	News/talk
XHPP-FM (Fortín, Veracruz)	100.3	Cuapichapan	Radio Espectáculo, S.A.	La Comadre	Regional Mexican
XHCSCK-FM	100.5	Coatzacoalcos	Imelda Bravo Ríos	—N/a	—N/a
XHVE-FM	100.5	Veracruz	Stereorey México, S.A.	La Mejor	Regional Mexican
XHALAPA-FM	100.9	Alto Lucero	Multimedios Radio, S.A. de C.V.	La Lupe	Adult hits
XHEJD-FM	100.9	Poza Rica	Radio Tropicana, S.A. de C.V.	Vida Romántica	Romantic
XHMTV-FM	100.9	Minatitlán	Oscar Bravo, S.A. de C.V.	El Lobo de Mina	Regional Mexican
XHPER-FM	101.1	Perote	Rradiotl, A.C.	Inolvidable	Spanish oldies
XHTAN-FM	101.3	Huayacocotla	Gobierno del Estado de Veracruz	Radiomás	Public radio
XHTQ-FM	101.3	Ixhuatlancillo	Radio Orizaba, S.A.	Romántica	Romantic
XHTD-FM	101.7	Coatzacoalcos	Impulsora de Radio del Sureste, S.A.	Soy FM	Contemporary hit radio
XHAR-FM	101.7	Pueblo Viejo	Comercializadora de Eventos Radiofónicos, S.A. de C.V.	La Mexicana	Regional Mexican
XHPR-FM	101.7	Veracruz	Impulsora de Radio del Sureste, S.A.	Soy FM	Tropical
XHRIC-FM	101.9	Poza Rica	Estudio 101.9, S.A. de C.V.	Exa FM	Contemporary hit radio
XHAG-FM	102.1	Córdoba	X.E.A.G., S.A.	Globo	Adult contemporary
XHJA-FM	102.5	Xalapa	XEJA, S.A.	La Neta	Regional Mexican
XHPR-FM	102.7	Poza Rica	Compañía Radiofónica de Poza Rica, S.A. de C.V.	Globo	Romantic
XHCAY-FM	102.9	Acayucan	Comunidad, Educación y Valores, A.C.	Radio Banana	Variety
XHTS-FM	102.9	Veracruz	Radio Tipo, S.A.	Ya! FM	Contemporary hit radio
XHFU-FM	103.3	Cosamaloapan	Voz Amiga de la Cuenca del Papaloapan, S.A. de C.V.	Voz Amiga de Papaloapan	
XHZL-FM	103.3	Xalapa	Radiodifusoras Capital, S.A. de C.V.	Lokura FM	Spanish adult hits
XHGB-FM	103.5	Nanchital	Radiodifusora XEGB-AM, S.A. de C.V.	La Poderosa	Regional Mexican
XHPV-FM	103.5	Papantla de Olarte	Radio Tajín, S.A. de C.V.	La Más Picuda	Regional Mexican
XHRNV-FM	103.7	Naranjos	Radio Naranjos, A.C.	Radio Naranjos	Variety
XHCS-FM	103.7	Veracruz	Radio Mil del Puerto, S. de R.L. de C.V.	Love	Romantic
XHDQ-FM	103.9	San Andrés Tuxtla	Radio Ondas de los Tuxtlas, S.A. de C.V.	La Ke Buena	Regional Mexican
XHGR-FM	104.1	Xalapa	GR Radio, S.A. de C.V.	Los 40	Contemporary hit radio
XHATV-FM	104.3	Álamo	Ageo Hernández Hernández	Unción FM	Christian
XHTZA-FM	104.3	Coatzacoalcos	Sistema Público de Radiodifusión del Estado Mexicano	Altavoz Radio	Public radio
XHMCA-FM	104.3	Los Pichones	XEMCA del Golfo, S.A. de C.V.	La Reyna de las Huastecas	Regional Mexican
XHGMS-FM	104.5	Martinez de la Torre	Pedro, Maria Elisa, Maria Teresa, Jose Manuel y Luis Miguel Manterola Sainz	104.5 FM Sólo Hits	Contemporary hit radio
XHEVC-FM	104.5	Pueblo de las Flores	Radio Cañón, S.A. de C.V.	W Radio	News
XHPTLA-FM	104.7	San Andrés Tuxtla	Mezkla FM, S.A. de C.V.	Mezkla FM	Contemporary hit radio
XHBD-FM	104.9	Banderilla	Radio Lujo, S.A. de C.V.	El Patrón	Regional Mexican
XHJF-FM	105.1	Tierra Blanca	Gilberto Roldán Haaz Diez	Radio Max	Regional Mexican
XHFCE-FM	105.5	Huayacocotla	Fomento Cultural y Educativo, A.C.	Radio Huaya	Community radio
XHOBA-FM	105.5	Orizaba	Gobierno del Estado de Veracruz	Radiomás	Public radio
XHEMI-FM	105.7	Cosoleacaque	Radiodifusora XEMI-AM, S.A. de C.V.	Latino	Regional Mexican
XHPUGC-FM	105.7	Ursulo Galván–Villa Cardel	Multimedios Radio, S.A. de C.V.	La Lupe	Spanish adult hits
XHLE-FM	105.9	Ciudad Cuauhtémoc	Grupo Coral de Tampico, S.A. de C.V.	La Líder, La Radio de Tampico	Variety
XHCOV-FM	105.9	Poza Rica	XECOV-AM, S.A. de C.V.	Éxtasis Digital	English classic hits
XHETF-FM	106.1	Veracruz	Transmisora Regional Radio Fórmula, S.A. de C.V.	Trión	Alternative rock
XHSCID-FM	106.1	Agua Dulce	Comunicación Hidrómila, A.C.	La Mega	Community radio
XHSIBY-FM	106.3	Mecatlán	Comunidad Indígena Tutunakú Asentada en Mecatlán	—N/a	—N/a
XHZUL-FM	106.5	Cerro Azul	Gobierno del Estado de Veracruz	Radiomás	Public radio
XHQT-FM	106.9	Veracruz	XEQT, S.A. de C.V.	La Poderosa	Regional Mexican
XHSCFD-FM	107.1	Amatlán de los Reyes	Radio Pochota, A.C.	Radio Pochota	Community radio
XHHTY-FM	107.1	Martínez de la Torre	Diego Arrazola Becerra	La Ke Buena	Regional Mexican
XHOM-FM	107.5	Coatzacoalcos	Enlaces Transístmicos, S.A. de C.V.	La Ke Buena	Regional Mexican
XHKG-FM	107.5	Pueblo de las Flores	Radio Cañón, S.A. de C.V.	Los 40	Contemporary hit radio
XHXAL-FM	107.7	Xalapa	Gobierno del Estado de Veracruz	Radiomás	Public radio
XHSCLO-FM	107.9	Coatzacoalcos	Yanavi, A.C.	VC Radio	Community radio

== Defunct ==
- XEDW-AM 1260, Minatitlán, 1936–1969
