= XHPP-FM =

As a result of the AM-FM migration in Mexico, two radio stations currently bear the XHPP-FM callsign:

- XHPP-FM (Fortín, Veracruz), 100.3 FM "La Comadre"
- XHPP-FM (Pánuco, Veracruz), 93.5 FM "@FM" (also serving Tampico)
