= 630 AM =

AM radio frequency

The following radio stations broadcast on AM frequency 630 kHz: 630 AM is a regional U.S. broadcast frequency.

Because 630 kHz is a multiple of both 9 and 10, the frequency is available for use by broadcast stations in all three ITU regions.

== Argentina ==
- LW8 in San Salvador de Jujuy
- LS5 in Buenos Aires
- LU4 in Comodoro Rivadavia, Chubut

== Australia ==
- 7RN in Queenstown, TA
- 2PB in Sydney, NSW
- 4QN in Townsville, QLD
- 6AL in Albany, WA

== Bangladesh ==
- S2D-1 in Dakha

== Brazil ==
- ZYH422 in Macapá
- ZYH-636 in Campo Sales
- ZYI-384 in Cuiabá
- ZYJ284 in Curitiba
- ZYJ-920 in Aracaju
- ZYJ-466 in Rio de Janeiro
- ZYK259 in Lago Vermelha
- ZYK-289 in Santa Maria, Rio Grande do Sul
- ZYK-302 in São Lourenço do Oeste
- ZYK-613 in Macapá
- ZYK-635 in Presidente Prudente
- ZYL-299 in Uberaba
- ZYH-636 in Campos Sales, Ceará

== Canada ==
Call sign	City of license	Daytime power (kW)	Nighttime power (kW)	Transmitter coordinates
CBKU	Sayward, British Columbia	0.04	0.04	50.388056°N 125.961944°W

== Chile ==
- CB-063 in Valparaíso

== China ==
- CNR Business Radio

== Colombia ==
- HJFD in Manizales
- HJE69 in Inírida, Guainía

== Cuba ==
- CMHA in Camagüey
- CMOA in Nueva Gerona

== Dominican Republic ==
- HIAF in San Fernando de Monte Cristi

== Ecuador ==
- HCHA2 in Quevedo

== El Salvador ==
- YSLN in San Salvador

== Honduras ==
- HRLP 7 in La Ceiba

== India ==
- VUT3 in Thrissur

== Indonesia ==
- P2MB.. in Jakarta
- 8FR200 in Ujung Pandang

== Kuwait ==
- 9KV-4 in Kuwait City

== Liberia ==
- ELBC in Monrovia

== Mexico ==
- XECCQ-AM in Cancun, Quintana Roo
- XEERO-AM in Esteros, Tamaulipas
- XEFB-AM in Guadalupe, Nuevo León
- XEFU-AM in Cosamaloapan de Carpio, Verzcruz
- XEFX-AM in Guaymas, Sonora
- XEOPE-AM in Mazatlan, Sinaloa
- XEPBGJ-AM in Guadalajara, Jalisco

== New Zealand ==
- ZL2YZ in Napier/Hawke's Bay/Opapa

=== Cook Islands ===
- E5ZC (formerly ZK1ZC) in Black Rock

== Norway ==
- LKA in Vigra

== Pakistan ==
- APL-1 in Lahore

== Panama ==
- HOJ 35 in Chitre

== Paraguay ==
- ZP50 in Areguá

== Peru ==
- OAX1T in Jaén

== Philippines ==
Call sign	City of license	Power (kW)
DYWB	Bacolod City	10.00
DWPM	Quezon City	50.00

== Portugal ==
- CSA222 in Chaves
- CSA305 in Miranda do Douro
- CSA342 in Montemor-o-Velho

== Russian Federation ==
- RW3 in Saratov

== Singapore ==
- ZHL-AM (now Gold 905) in Singapore

== South Korea ==
- KBS Radio 1 in Suncheon

== Thailand ==
- HSAC-AM in Bangkok

== Tunisia ==
- Établissement de la Radiodiffusion-Télévision Tunisienne in Tunis-Djedeida

== Turkey ==
- TAZ-1 in Çukurova

== United States ==
Call sign	City of license	Facility ID	Class	Daytime power (kW)	Nighttime power (kW)	Transmitter coordinates
KCIS	Edmonds, Washington	14504	B	5	2.5	47.768333°N 122.351944°W (daytime); 47.85°N 122.160556°W (nighttime)
KFXD	Boise, Idaho	63915	D	5	0.037	43.515556°N 116.328611°W
KHOW	Denver, Colorado	48962	B	5	5	39.91°N 104.913889°W
KIAM	Nenana, Alaska	70450	B	10	3.1	64.478611°N 149.086111°W
KICH	Agana, Guam	51238	B	10	10	13.448056°N 144.756111°E
KJNO	Juneau, Alaska	61235	B	5	1	58.329722°N 134.471389°W
KPLY	Reno, Nevada	50304	B	5	1	39.573611°N 119.846667°W
KSLR	San Antonio, Texas	58634	B	5	4.3	29.391389°N 98.35°W (daytime); 29.530556°N 98.120278°W (nighttime)
KTRW	Opportunity, Washington	13568	D	0.62	0.062	47.608611°N 117.373611°W
KVMA	Magnolia, Arkansas	39618	D	1	0.03	33.299722°N 93.2325°W
KWRO	Coquille, Oregon	13874	D	5	0.046	43.171389°N 124.198333°W
KYFI	St. Louis, Missouri	73299	B	5	5	38.671667°N 90.114444°W
WAIZ	Hickory, North Carolina	20323	D	1	0.057	35.722778°N 81.278056°W
WAVU	Albertville, Alabama	58944	D	1	0.028	34.238611°N 86.166389°W
WEJL	Scranton, Pennsylvania	66363	D	2	0.032	41.409444°N 75.666944°W
WJAW	St. Marys, West Virginia	59716	D	1	0.037	39.395°N 81.230278°W
WLAP	Lexington, Kentucky	68209	B	5	1	38.123611°N 84.445833°W
WMFD	Wilmington, North Carolina	61701	B	0.8	1	34.271944°N 77.974444°W
WNEG	Toccoa, Georgia	63330	D	5	0.044	34.567778°N 83.323889°W
WPRO	Providence, Rhode Island	64843	B	5	5	41.774444°N 71.323056°W
WREY	St. Paul, Minnesota	41970	B	3	2.4	44.866944°N 92.900556°W
WSBN	Washington, District of Columbia	73250	B	10	2.7	39.133889°N 77.303889°W
WUNO	San Juan, Puerto Rico	54476	B	5	5	18.433056°N 66.272778°W

== Venezuela ==
- YVJA in San Fernando
- YVKA in Caracas
