= Sedeño =

Sedeño is a Spanish surname. Notable people with the surname include:

- Antonio Sedeño (died 1538), Spanish conquistador and governor of Trinidad
- Diego Ramírez Sedeño de Fuenleal (1524–1573), Spanish Roman Catholic bishop
- Mavros Sedeño, French artist and video game developer

== See also ==
- Sedeño River, a river of Mexico
