= XHTU-FM =

Radio station in Tuxpan, Veracruz

- Tuxpan, Veracruz; Mexico
- Broadcast area: Tuxpan-Poza Rica
- Frequency: 92.3 FM
- RDS: FIESTAMX
- Branding: Fiesta Mexicana

Programming
- Format: Regional Mexican

Ownership
- Owner: Radiorama; (XHTU-FM, S.A. de C.V.)
- Sister stations: XHRRR-FM, XHCRA-FM, XHTVR-FM, XHEJD-FM, XHCOV-FM, XHPV-FM

History
- First air date: August 25, 1993 (concession)
- Call sign meaning: TUxpan

Technical information
- Licensing authority: CRT
- Class: B
- ERP: 20.68 kW
- HAAT: 133.30 m

Links
- Website: radioramapozarica.mx

XHTU-FM is a radio station on 92.3 FM in Tuxpan, Veracruz. It is owned by Radiorama and is known as Fiesta Mexicana.

== History ==
XHTU received its concession on August 25, 1993.
