= XHOT-FM =

Radio station in Xalapa, Veracruz, Mexico

- Xalapa, Veracruz; Mexico
- Frequency: 97.7 FM
- Branding: La Máquina 97.7

Programming
- Format: Grupera and tropical music

Ownership
- Owner: Avanradio; (La Máquina Tropical, S.A.)
- Sister stations: XHKL-FM, XHWA-FM, XHJA-FM

History
- First air date: April 14, 1987 (concession)
- Call sign meaning: Octavio Tena Álvarez del Castillo

Technical information
- ERP: 50 kW

Links
- Website: www.maquina977.com

XHOT-FM is a radio station on 97.7 FM in Xalapa, Veracruz. It is owned by Avanradio and is known as La Máquina 97.7.

== History ==
XHOT received its concession on April 14, 1987. It was originally owned by Octavio Tena Álvarez del Castillo.
