= XHPW-FM =

Radio station in Poza Rica, Veracruz, Mexico

- Poza Rica, Veracruz; Mexico
- Frequency: 94.7 MHz
- Branding: La Mejor

Programming
- Format: Regional Mexican
- Affiliations: MVS Radio

Ownership
- Owner: Marcos López Zamora; (XEPW, S.A. de C.V.)
- Sister stations: XHRIC-FM, XHPR-FM

History
- First air date: November 3, 1964 (concession)

Technical information
- Licensing authority: CRT
- Class: B1
- ERP: 25 kW
- HAAT: 36.06 m
- Transmitter coordinates: 20°32′17″N 97°28′09″W

Links
- Webcast: Listen live
- Website: lamejor.com.mx

XHPW-FM is a radio station on 94.7 FM in Poza Rica, Veracruz, Mexico. It carries the La Mejor Regional Mexican format from MVS Radio.

== History ==
XEPW-AM 1200 received its concession on November 3, 1964. It was owned by Oscar Lozano Luna and broadcast as a 250-watt daytimer. XEPW was sold to a corporation in 1977, and in the 1990s it upgraded to 1,000 watts and began nighttime service at 300 watts.

XEPW was authorized to move to FM in November 2010.

In February 2021, Arroba FM moved to XHRRR-FM 89.3 as a result of the announced sale of XHPR-FM and XHPW-FM by Grupo Radiorama to Marcos López Zamora, the owner of XHRIC-FM 101.9, who immediately took over operation of both frequencies and installed MVS Radio franchise formats.
