= XEDW-AM =

Former radio station in Minatitlán, Veracruz, Mexico

Defunct
- Minatitlán, Veracruz; Mexico
- Frequency: 1260 kHz

Ownership
- Owner: Héctor Silva Canto
- Operator: Daniel Schacht Pérez
- Sister stations: XEKM-AM

History
- First air date: July 1, 1936
- Last air date: September 5, 1969
- Former frequencies: 1150 kHz (1936–1941)

Technical information
- Power: 250 watts

XEDW-AM was a radio station in Minatitlán, Veracruz, Mexico. The station broadcast from 1936 to September 5, 1969—13 years beyond the expiration of its concession—when it was closed by a federal government inspector.

== History ==
XEDW was awarded its concession on July 1, 1936. The 20-year concession was made to Héctor Silva Canto. The station broadcast on 1150 kHz until moving to 1260 khz with the adoption of the North American Regional Broadcasting Agreement on March 29, 1941, where it operated with 250 watts. The concession expired on June 30, 1956, without being renewed.

On September 5, 1969, XEDW was visited by Víctor Hernández Castillo, a federal inspector from the Directorate General of Telecommunications, and ordered closed. The person who presented himself as the operator of the station, Daniel Schacht Pérez, replied one day late to a letter asking him to show cause why the station should not be permanently closed. (Schacht owned XEKM-AM a radio station in the same city.) As a result, in a resolution dated February 16, 1972 but not published in the Diario Oficial de la Federación until March 17, 1975, the Secretariat of Communications and Transportation decreed the closure of the station and ordered it to pay a fine of 5,000 pesos.

The 1260 khz frequency in Minatitlán was opened to new commercial bidders on October 18, 1976, as XEMTV-AM. Oscar Bravo Santos was the only applicant to file for the frequency on time, and his XEMTV-AM signed on October 14, 1983.
