= 710 AM =

AM radio frequency

The following radio stations broadcast on AM frequency 710 kHz: 710 AM is a United States clear channel frequency. KIRO Seattle and WOR New York City share Class A status of 710 kHz.

== In Argentina ==
- LRL202 in Buenos Aires.
- LRA17 in Zapala, Neuquén
- LRA19 in Puerto Iguazú, Misiones

== In Canada ==
Call sign	City of license	Daytime power (kW)	Nighttime power (kW)	Transmitter coordinates
CBOM (Moving to 93.3 FM)	Maniwaki, Quebec	0.04	0.04	46.3736°N 75.9564°W
CKVO	Clarenville, Newfoundland and Labrador	10	10	48.143333°N 53.961111°W

== In Mexico ==
- XEDP-AM in Cd Cuauhtémoc, Chihuahua
- XEMAR-AM in Acapulco, Guerrero
- XEMP-AM in Mexico City
- XEOLA-AM in Ciudad Madero, Tamaulipas
- XESMR-AM in San Luis Potosí, San Luis Potosí

== In the United States ==
Stations in bold are clear-channel stations.

Call sign	City of license	Facility ID	Class	Daytime power (kW)	Nighttime power (kW)	Unlimited power (kW)	Transmitter coordinates
KCMO	Kansas City, Missouri	33391	B	10	5		39.318889°N 94.496667°W
KEEL	Shreveport, Louisiana	46983	B	50	5		32.683333°N 93.859167°W (daytime); 32.681667°N 93.859444°W (nighttime)
KFIA	Carmichael, California	50300	B	25	1		38.832778°N 121.3175°W
KGNC	Amarillo, Texas	63159	B	10	10		35.419722°N 101.556667°W
**KIRO**	Seattle, Washington	6362	A	50	50		47.398611°N 122.433333°W
KNUS	Denver, Colorado	42377	B			5	39.955278°N 104.850278°W
KSPN	Los Angeles, California	33255	B	34	2.5		34.173889°N 118.409722°W
KURV	Edinburg, Texas	70463	B	1	0.91		26.328611°N 98.159722°W (daytime); 26.328333°N 98.16°W (nighttime)
KXMR	Bismarck, North Dakota	2211	B	4	4		46.668889°N 100.775833°W
WAQI	Miami, Florida	37254	B	50	50		25.968611°N 80.378889°W
WDSM	Superior, Wisconsin	71356	B	10	5		46.653611°N 92.147222°W
WKJB	Mayaguez, Puerto Rico	54824	B	10	0.75		18.169167°N 67.150556°W
WKOO	Rose Hill, North Carolina	17745	D	2.5			34.863333°N 78.037778°W
WNTM	Mobile, Alabama	8695	B	1	1		30.720278°N 88.059444°W
**WOR**	New York, New York	7710	A	50	50		40.797222°N 74.09°W
WPOG	St. Matthews, South Carolina	54577	D	1			33.617778°N 80.780556°W
WROM	Rome, Georgia	66283	D	1			34.253056°N 85.155278°W
WTPR	Paris, Tennessee	71503	D	0.75			36.279722°N 88.342222°W
WUFF	Eastman, Georgia	21212	D	2.5			32.221667°N 83.217778°W
WYJV	Smyrna, Tennessee	58737	D	0.25			35.975278°N 86.554444°W
