= XHCRA-FM =

Radio station in Álamo Temapache, Veracruz, Mexico

- Álamo-Temapache, Veracruz; Mexico
- Broadcast area: Tuxpan, Veracruz
- Frequency: 93.1 FM
- Branding: La Poderosa

Programming
- Format: Regional Mexican

Ownership
- Owner: Grupo Radiorama; (XHCRA-FM, S.A. de C.V.)
- Operator: Pergom Medios
- Sister stations: XHRRR-FM (Veracruz), XHTU-FM, XHTVR-FM, XHEJD-FM, XHPV-FM

History
- First air date: November 12, 1993 (concession)
- Call sign meaning: CeRro Azul

Technical information
- Licensing authority: CRT
- Class: C1
- ERP: 40 kW
- HAAT: 231.50 m

Links
- Webcast: Listen live
- Website: lapoderosaenlinea.com

XHCRA-FM is a radio station on 93.1 FM serving Tuxpan, with its transmitter in Cerro El Calvario, Álamo-Temapache, Veracruz, Mexico. It is owned by Grupo Radiorama, operated by Pergom Medios, and carries its La Poderosa Regional Mexican format.

== History ==
XHCRA received its concession on November 12, 1993. Originally put out for bid to be located in Cerro Azul, XHCRA was owned by Alejandro Solís Barrera. The current concessionaire was awarded the station in 2015.

The tower is on Cerro El Calvario in Álamo Temapache, but XHCRA is based in Tuxpan and is part of a Radiorama cluster that includes XHTVR-FM.
