= XHJA-FM =

Radio station in Xalapa, Veracruz

- Xalapa, Veracruz; Mexico
- Frequency: 102.5 MHz
- Branding: La Neta

Programming
- Format: Regional Mexican

Ownership
- Owner: Avanradio; (XEJA, S.A.)
- Sister stations: XHKL-FM, XHTZ-FM, XHOT-FM

History
- First air date: December 11, 1941 (concession)
- Former call signs: XEJA-AM
- Former frequencies: 1400 kHz , 610 kHz
- Call sign meaning: XAlapa

Technical information
- ERP: 25 kW
- Transmitter coordinates: 19°32′21″N 96°54′20″W

Links
- Website: laneta1025.com

XHJA-FM is a radio station on 102.5 FM in Xalapa, Veracruz. It is owned by Avanradio and carries a Regional Mexican format known as La Neta.

== History ==
XEJA-AM 1400 received its concession on December 11, 1941. It was owned by Daniel Schacht Pérez. By the 1960s, it was owned by its current concessionaire and broadcast on 610 kHz.

It was approved to migrate to FM in 2013 as XHJA-FM on 102.5.
