= XHBD-FM =

Radio station in Veracruz, Mexico

- Banderilla, Veracruz; Mexico
- Frequency: 104.9 FM
- Branding: El Patrón

Programming
- Format: Regional Mexican

Ownership
- Owner: Grupo Oliva Radio; (Radio Lujo, S.A. de C.V.)
- Sister stations: XHYV-FM, XHTP-FM

History
- First air date: December 16, 1971 (concession)
- Former call signs: XEBD-AM
- Former frequencies: 1100 kHz, 1210 kHz
- Call sign meaning: Banderilla

Technical information
- Licensing authority: CRT
- Class: B
- ERP: 25 kW
- HAAT: 179.53 m
- Transmitter coordinates: 19°35′43″N 97°00′36″W

Links
- Webcast: Listen live
- Website: El Patrón website

XHBD-FM is a radio station on 104.9 FM in Banderilla, Veracruz. It is owned by Grupo Oliva Radio and known as El Patrón with a Regional Mexican format.

== History ==
XEBD-AM 1100, originally based in Perote, received its concession on December 16, 1971. It was owned by Francisco González de la Barrera and broadcast with 250 watts. By 1991, it had been moved to Banderilla on 1210 kHz, with 10,000 watts during the day and 200 at night.

XEBD was authorized to migrate to FM in November 2010 and approved for a signal upgrade in 2018.

The concessionaire, Radio Lujo, is named for Luis Miguel and José Luis Oliva Cano, who own Grupo Oliva Radio.
