= XEFB-AM =

Radio station in Monterrey, Nuevo León, Mexico

- Monterrey, Nuevo León; Mexico
- Frequency: 630 AM
- Branding: Acustik Radio

Programming
- Format: Regional Mexican

Ownership
- Owner: Grupo Acustik; (Emisora 1150, S.A. de C.V.)

History
- First air date: 1932

Technical information
- Licensing authority: CRT
- Class: B
- Power: 10,000 watts
- Transmitter coordinates: 25°38′48.8″N 100°18′46.7″W

Links
- Website: acustiknoticias.com

XEFB-AM is a radio station on 630 AM in Monterrey, Nuevo León, Mexico. It is owned by Grupo Acustik.

== History ==
Logo as La FB 630 used between 2013 until and 2018.

XEFB received its concession on September 1, 1932. It originally operated on 1315 kilohertz with 100 watts. Jesús Quintanilla, the original concessionaire, sold XEFB to Emisoras Incorporadas de Monterrey in 1945. In 1958, XEFB-TV launched, Monterrey's first local station; it is now part of Televisa.

XEFB later moved to 630 kHz.

In 2015, Emisoras Incorporadas de Monterrey was replaced by Radio Emisora XHSP-FM as the concessionaire as part of a restructuring of the stations then owned by Grupo Radio México. GRM merged with corporate cousin Grupo Radio Centro in 2016 sold AM stations in each of Monterrey, Guadalajara, and Mexico City to Acustik. Until October 8 2021, it was decided to end the radio station due to the financial crisis of GRC and a year later it was sold to Grupo Acustik with the Acustik Radio station that was on 600 AM moving to 630 AM
