= XHEOLA-FM =

Radio station in Tampico, Mexico

- Tampico, Tamaulipas; Mexico
- Broadcast area: Ciudad Madero / Tampico, Tamaulipas, Mexico
- Frequency: 103.5 FM
- RDS: HUASTECA
- Branding: La Huasteca

Programming
- Format: Regional Mexican

Ownership
- Owner: Grupo Radiorama; (Música Radiofónica, S.A. de C.V.)
- Sister stations: XHPAV-FM, XHPP-FM, XHETU-FM

History
- First air date: August 20, 1960 (concession)
- Former call signs: XEJT-AM, XEOLA-AM
- Former frequencies: 1460 kHz, 710 kHz, 107.9 MHz
- Call sign meaning: "Ola" means wave

Technical information
- Licensing authority: CRT
- Class: B1
- ERP: 25,000 watts
- HAAT: 81.7 m (268 ft)
- Transmitter coordinates: 22°14′06″N 97°51′34″W

Links
- Webcast: Listen live
- Website: La Huasteca 103.5 FM website

XHEOLA-FM (branded as La Huasteca) is a Mexican Spanish-language FM radio station located in Tampico, Tamaulipas. The frequency is 103.5 MHz.

== History ==
XEJT-AM 1460 received its concession on August 20, 1960. It was owned by Carlos Zárate Urbina and broadcast with 1,000 watts. By 1966, Música Radiofónica, S.A., had bought the station. The callsign was changed to XEOLA-AM in the 1970s. In the 1990s, XEOLA moved to 710 kHz; it was cleared to move to FM in 2011.

On April 28, 2018, XHEOLA-FM moved from 107.9 to 103.5 MHz. The frequency change was a requirement of its 2017 concession renewal, so as to clear 106-108 MHz for community and indigenous stations.
