= XHNE-FM =

Radio station in Coatzacoalcos, Veracruz, Mexico

- Coatzacoalcos, Veracruz; Mexico
- Frequency: 100.1 MHz
- Branding: Los 40

Programming
- Format: Pop
- Affiliations: Radiópolis

Ownership
- Owner: Liberal del Sur; (Coatza Top, S. A. de C.V.)
- Sister stations: XHOM-FM

History
- First air date: October 5, 1979 (concession)

Technical information
- Licensing authority: CRT
- Class: B
- ERP: 52.47 kW
- HAAT: 42.1 meters
- Transmitter coordinates: 18°8′8.6″N 94°25′59.4″W

Links
- Webcast: Listen live
- Website: los40coatza.com

XHNE-FM is a radio station on 100.1 FM in Coatzacoalcos, Veracruz, Mexico. It is the local franchise of the Los 40 pop format from Radiópolis.

== History ==
XHNE received its concession on October 5, 1979. It was owned by Rosa María Baptista y van der Elst. In April 1994, it was sold to ACIR and its power raised to 52 kW. At that time, it adopted the format it would have for the next 28 years, La Comadre, with a Regional Mexican format.

Effective June 28, 2022, Grupo ACIR opted to shut down XHOM-FM and XHNE-FM, taking XHNE-FM off the air after 43 years. The closure of the cluster caused the loss of 17 jobs. That same week, XHDQ-FM in San Andrés Tuxtla was closed.

On November 21 of the same year, under new operators, XHNE and its sister station XHOM-FM 107.5 returned to the air, with XHNE using the Los 40 pop brand, a format that was on XHGB-FM 103.5 until 2017. Coatza Top became the concessionaire in 2024.
