= XHTD-FM =

Radio station in Coatzacoalcos, Veracruz, Mexico

- Coatzacoalcos, Veracruz; Mexico
- Broadcast area: Coatzacoalcos
- Frequency: 101.7 MHz
- Branding: Soy FM

Programming
- Format: Pop

Ownership
- Owner: Grupo Radio Digital; (Impulsora de Radio del Sureste, S.A.)

History
- First air date: September 27, 1979 (concession)

Technical information
- Licensing authority: CRT
- Class: C1
- ERP: 61.52 kW
- HAAT: 73.20 m

Links
- Webcast: Listen live
- Website: soypopcoatza.com

XHTD-FM is a radio station on 101.7 FM in Coatzacoalcos, Veracruz, Mexico. It is owned by Grupo Radio Digital and carries a pop format known as Soy FM.

== History ==
XHTD received its concession on September 27, 1979. It was owned by Octavio Tena Álvarez del Castillo. It was sold to Frecuencia Modulada de Coatzacoalcos, S.A. de C.V. on May 15, 1986 and became part of Grupo FM. Originally broadcasting pop music in Spanish and English under the name "Más FM". XHTD changed to Vox FM brand, the name used on XEX-FM in Mexico City in 1999. In 2004, the station became part of the Los 40 Principales network before was dropped on July 13, 2011. In September, it changed to Mar FM, which played classical music in English used by XHPB-FM in the city of Veracruz.

In late 2015, Grupo FM was split into two companies owned by different parts of the same family, Grupo FM and Radio Networks; RN owned the latter station along with XHFTI-FM in Cordoba and XHRN-FM in the city of Veracruz. XHTD adopted the grupera-tropical format known as Más Latina, used by those stations.

In April 2016, XHTD sold to Grupo Radio Digital for 71 million pesos (some US$4 million). The station flipped to Exa FM national format, and the concessionaire changed to Impulsora de Radio del Sureste, S.A., which holds the concession for Grupo Radio Digital's XHONC-FM in Tuxtla Gutierrez.

Most of GRD's stations dropped their MVS Radio franchised brands on May 1, 2021. XHTD adopted the current name and format.
