= XHCOV-FM =

Radio station in Poza Rica, Veracruz

Defunct
- Poza Rica, Veracruz; Mexico
- Frequency: 105.9 FM
- Branding: Éxtasis Digital

Programming
- Format: English classic hits

Ownership
- Owner: Radiorama; (XECOV-AM, S.A. de C.V.)
- Sister stations: XHTU-FM, XHRRR-FM, XHEJD-FM, XHPV-FM

History
- First air date: April 5, 1994 (concession)
- Last air date: June 15, 2024
- Call sign meaning: COatzintla Veracruz

Technical information
- ERP: 25 kW {{mexico- inf|FM| accessdate=2016-05-09}}
- Transmitter coordinates: 20°32′17″N 97°28′09″W

Links
- Website: radioramapozarica.mx

XHCOV-FM was a radio station on 105.9 FM in Poza Rica, Veracruz. It is owned by Radiorama and last is known as Éxtasis Digital.

== History ==
XECOV-AM 790 received its concession on April 5, 1994. It broadcast with 1,000 watts day and 500 at night and was owned by Radiorama concessionaire Radio Social, S.A.

XECOV was authorized to move to FM in November 2010.

In February 2021, the Éxtasis Digital format moved from XHPR-FM 102.7 as a result of the announced sale of XHPR-FM and XHPW-FM to Marcos López Zamora, the owner of XHRIC-FM 101.9.

On june 15 2024, XHCOV closed its fm boadcast. Currenty, éxtasis digital is still available but only online.
