= XHBY-FM =

Radio station in Tuxpan, Veracruz

- Tuxpan, Veracruz; Mexico
- Frequency: 96.7 FM
- Branding: Radio Lobo

Programming
- Format: Grupera

Ownership
- Owner: Grupo Radiorama; (XEBY, S.A. de C.V.)
- Operator: Grupo VG Comunicaciones
- Sister stations: XHCRA-FM; XHTVR-FM

History
- First air date: January 10, 1968 (concession)
- Former call signs: XEBY-AM
- Former frequencies: 1340 kHz, 890 kHz

Technical information
- ERP: 25 kW
- Transmitter coordinates: 20°58′17″N 97°24′32″W

Links
- Webcast: sts.pergom.mx/xhby
- Website: radiolobo967fm.com

XHBY-FM is a radio station on 96.7 FM in Tuxpan, Veracruz. It is owned by Radiorama and operated by Grupo VG Comunicaciones, and is known as Radio Lobo with a grupera format.

== History ==
XEBY-AM 1340 received its concession on January 10, 1968. It was owned by Elvira Ferrer de Almazan and broadcast with 250 watts. The station transferred to Calixto Almazan Ferrer in 2002, José Alberto Almazan Marín in 2004, and a Radiorama subsidiary in 2006. It also moved to 890 kHz in the 1990s.

XEBY was authorized to move to FM in November 2010. In February 2019, it dropped its Éxtasis Digital English classic hits format and became a grupera station as Radio Lobo.
