= XHKL-FM =

Radio station in Xalapa, Veracruz, Mexico

- Xalapa, Veracruz; Mexico
- Frequency: 93.7 FM
- Branding: Magia

Programming
- Format: Spanish oldies

Ownership
- Owner: Avanradio; (XEKL, S.A.)
- Sister stations: XHJA-FM, XHTZ-FM, XHOT-FM

History
- First air date: April 11, 1942
- Former call signs: XEKL-AM
- Former frequencies: 550 kHz

Technical information
- Licensing authority: CRT
- Class: B1
- ERP: 25 kW
- HAAT: 154.10 m
- Transmitter coordinates: 19°32′21″N 96°54′20″W

Links
- Webcast: sc10.conectarhosting.com/..
- Website: magia937.com

XHKL-FM is a radio station on 93.7 FM in Xalapa, Veracruz, Mexico. It is owned by Avanradio and is known as Magia.

== History ==
XEKL-AM 550 received its concession on January 8, 1942. The first radio station in Xalapa, XEKL was owned by Carlos Ferráez Matos until 1967 and broadcast with 1,000 watts day and 250 watts night. Daytime power later increased to 5,000 watts. In 2016, Ferráez Matos was honored with a commemorative ticket issued by the National Lottery.

In 2010, XEKL was cleared to migrate to FM as XHKL-FM 93.7.
