= XHTQ-FM =

Radio station in Ixhuatlancillo–Orizaba, Veracruz

Ixhuatlancillo, Veracruz; Mexico
- Broadcast area: Orizaba, Veracruz
- Frequency: 101.3 FM
- Branding: Romántica 101.3

Ownership
- Owner: ROGSA/Grupo Radiorama; (Radio Orizaba, S.A.)
- Sister stations: XHOV-FM

History
- First air date: 1945

Technical information
- ERP: 3 kW
- HAAT: 53.75 m
- Transmitter coordinates: 18°52′40.05″N 97°07′15.75″W

Links
- Website: www.rogsa.mx

XHTQ-FM is an FM radio station in Ixhuatlancillo and Orizaba, Veracruz, Mexico. It broadcasts romantic music as Romántica 101.3.

In its incarnation as AM station XETQ-AM, it was at one point a clear-channel station on 850 kHz.

== History ==
The concession for XETQ was awarded to Francisco Campos H. in 1945, specifying operation at 250 watts on 1370 kHz. It was the third radio station in Orizaba, after the government-owned XEFD and privately owned XEPP.

By the 1960s, the low power allotment and frequency were changed, and the small station soon became a clear-channel station on 850 kHz. It was authorized for 100 kW day/50 kW night. Sometime in the 1990s, this high power level was dropped in favor of a 10 kW day/1 kW night pattern.

The AM-FM migration caused XETQ to become XHTQ-FM on 101.3 MHz; XETQ-AM 850 was shut off for good in 2013.
