= XHTP-FM =

Radio station in Banderilla–Xalapa, Veracruz

- Banderilla, Veracruz; Mexico
- Broadcast area: Xalapa
- Frequency: 95.5 MHz (HD Radio)
- RDS: SENSACION
- Branding: 95.5 Sensación FM

Programming
- Format: Spanish and English Top 40 (CHR)

Ownership
- Owner: Grupo Oliva Radio; (José Luis Oliva Meza)
- Sister stations: XHBD-FM, XHYV-FM

History
- First air date: February 22, 1977 (AM); 1994 (FM)
- Former call signs: XETP-AM
- Former frequencies: 1380 kHz (1977–2019)

Technical information
- Licensing authority: CRT
- Class: B
- ERP: 25 kW
- HAAT: 172.73 meters (566.7 ft)
- Transmitter coordinates: 19°35′43″N 97°00′36″W

Links
- Webcast: Listen live
- Website: Sensacion 95.5 website

XHTP-FM 95.5 is a radio station in Banderilla, Veracruz. It is known as Sensación and carries a Spanish and English Top 40 (CHR) format.

XHTP is the first HD Radio station in Veracruz; it received authorization to broadcast in HD Radio in 2012 and at the time promoted itself as the first HD Radio station in Mexico. It broadcasts only one subchannel.

== History ==
The concession for 1380 AM was awarded in 1977. The original transmitter was located at Noalinco. The FM station was added in 1994.

On October 28, 2019, XHTP presented the IFT with the surrender of its AM frequency, operating at 10,000 watts day and 1,000 watts night.
