= TVMás =

Television network of the Mexican state of Veracruz

Coordinates: 19°35′28″N 97°05′32″W

- Country: Mexico
- Broadcast area: State of Veracruz
- Headquarters: Xalapa

Ownership
- Owner: Gobierno del Estado de Veracruz (Radiotelevisión de Veracruz)

History
- Launched: October 23, 1980

Links
- Website: tvmas.mx

TVMás (call sign XHCPEO-TDT) is the state-owned public broadcaster serving the Mexican state of Veracruz. It and Radiomás, a statewide radio network, are operated by the public agency Radiotelevisión de Veracruz, which is based in the state capital of Xalapa.

== History ==
After receiving its permit on October 23, 1978, XHGV-TV channel 4 signed on January 6, 1980, with a formal inauguration by President José López Portillo. It was operated by the Secretariat of Education and Culture and was the first noncommercial regional television station in the country. It was known from the start as Canal 4 Más, owing to the analog station's plus offset. Initial programming focused on educational, informational and entertainment programs. The new station boasted a transmitter on Cerro de las Lajas and studios on Cerro de la Galaxia in the state capital of Xalapa.

It is the sister to the Radiomás state radio network, which was created in 2000.

The concession of XHGV-TDT expired without a properly filed renewal on December 31, 2021. A new concession for XHCPEO-TDT on the same channel was approved before the end of 2021, but due to technical adjustments and notification issues, the transmitter was temporarily shut down at the start of 2022. All of the remaining concessions were consolidated into this concession in an action approved by the Federal Telecommunications Institute on October 26, 2022.

== Transmitters ==
TVMás is broadcast by a total of five authorized transmitters located throughout Veracruz:

RF	Location	ERP
26	Las Lajas; Misantla	247.18 kW; 5 kW
33	Cerro Azul (Note: Formerly XHVCA-TDT)	50 kW
22	Coatzacoalcos (Note: Formerly XHGVC-TDT)	50 kW
29	Mecayapan (Note: Formerly XHZOT-TDT)	25 kW
26	Orizaba, Córdoba, Fortín	10 kW

XHGV, XHVCA, XHGVC (analog 21) and XHZOT became digital-only in December 2015. Four other stations, with transmitters at Huayacocotla, Ixhuatlán de Madero, Orizaba and San Andrés Tuxtla, were granted a one-year extension to remain in analog until 2016 and then had their concessions surrendered in August 2017, having never converted. A new transmitter to replace the Orizaba analog transmitter was approved by the IFT in February 2023.

TVMÁS is also available continent-wide on SATMEX 6 C-band satellite (4068.5 MHz, V, 9.5 Mbit/s, DVB-S).
