= Teodoro Cano García =

Mexican muralist

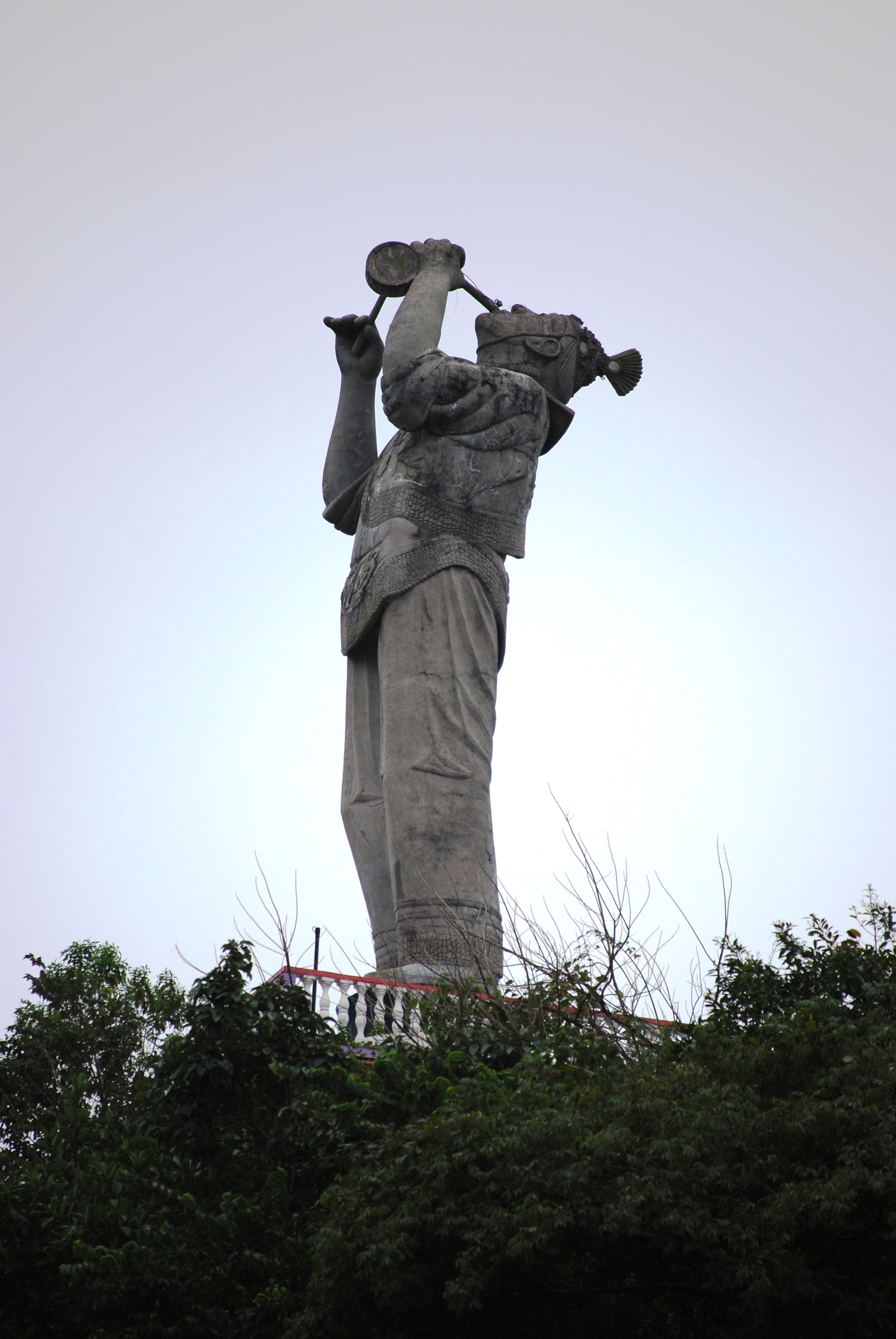
Cano's Volador statue overlooking the city of Papantla, Veracruz

Teodoro Cano García (born 1932) is an artist from Papantla, Veracruz, Mexico who is best known for his mural work depicting the Totonac culture of his native region in northern Veracruz. Cano was discovered by Diego Rivera, who helped Cano as a youth enter the prestigious San Carlos Academy and then employed him as an assistant with the mural work being done at the Ciudad Universitaria in Mexico City.

Cano painted his first solo mural in 1953, and since then has produced paintings, murals, sculptures, photography, book illustrations and more, including creating a high relief technique with a cement base. However, Cano is best known for his mural work which depicts and promotes the Totonac culture; and much of his work can be seen in his hometown, including a monumental sculpture of a Volador dancer overlooking the city. Cano also worked as an academic for over 36 years, recently retiring, but he continues to work as an artist based in Xalapa.

== Preparation ==
Cano was born in the small city of Papantla, Veracruz in 1932, and began drawing at a young age. When Diego Rivera was in Papantla in 1945, Cano had a chance to meet the famous painter and show him some of his work. Impressed, Rivera had the 14-year-old Cano come to Mexico City and work at his home as a personal assistant. However, this arrangement lasted only four months until Rivera decided that the young man needed formal training. He contacted then-governor of Veracruz Adolfo Ruiz Cortines to get a scholarship for Cano at the prestigious San Carlos Academy. Cano attended the institution from 1947 to 1951 and graduated with honors.

After graduation, he went back to work with Diego Rivera and José Chávez Morado, who were creating murals at the recently constructed Ciudad Universitaria (University City). Cano worked assisting both between 1949 and 1950, mostly with the works located on the Olympic stadium, the main library and the Faculty of Sciences buildings.

== Career ==
In 1953, he painted his first solo mural at radio station XEPR, called Historia del Petróleo (History of Petroleum). Soon after, he painted Papantla y sus Educadores (Papantla and Its Educators) at a primary school in his hometown. During the rest of the 1950s, he painted murals in various parts of Veracruz including Historia de Tuxpan y Homenaje al Maestro (History of Tuxpan and Tribute to the Teacher) in Tuxpan; Servicio Social (Social Service) in Poza Rica; Pérgola (Pergola) in Coatzintla ; Papantla in the same city and Royal in Poza Rica. In the 1960s, he mostly did canvas work, with expositions in the north of Veracruz. He painted one mural called Historia de Mexico (Mexican History) in Poza Rica.

His most prolific period was the 1970s, painting and sculpting numerous works in Veracruz, and, as a teacher, supervising many more works done by students as part of a muralist movement in rural areas of Veracruz, Campeche, Yucatán, Tamaulipas, Coahuila, Sinaloa and Colima .

In 1985, he created his most important work called Historia de la Educación Federal (History of Federal Education) at the Xalapa delegation of the Secretariat of Public Education. Also during the 1980s, he sculpted a number of works including a monument to the Niños Héroes in Coyutla and the monumental sculpture of a Volador dancer in Papantla. The 1990s were mostly devoted to mural work, including Historia de la Medicina (History of Medicine) in Xalapa, La Justicia (Justice) in Xalapa and Mis Raices (My Roots) in the Metro Bellas Artes in Mexico City. In the 2000s, he created works in various media including murals, sculpted murals and sculptures. During his entire career, he has had numerous showing of his non-mural/monumental works in the states of Veracruz, Aguascalientes, and Mexico City as well as abroad in San Francisco and Japan .

Book illustrations include Cuentos para ser contados (Stories to Be Told) in 1985; ECCE PEUR (literally Behold the Boy, from the Latin, the second word sometimes spelled Ecce Puer, which is the correct Latin spelling) in 1986; Cantares Huastecos y otros ensayos (Huastec Songs and Other Essays) in 1991; Brisas Huastecas (Huastecan Breezes) in 1996 and Memoria del Totonacapan (Memories of Totonacapan) in 1999.

Cano has worked in painting, sculpting, etching, drawing, book illustrations, and photography but is best known for his mural work, especially for work related to and promoting his native Totonac culture.(rincones15). He is the creator of a high relief mural technique with reinforced concrete as its base. Although Cano's work can be found in both Mexico and abroad, most of it is found in Veracruz state with over 60 murals alone there, and in Mexico City. (rincones15) His work can be also be found in many places in his native Papantla, from the monumental sculpture of a Volador dancer atop a mountain overlooking the city to large murals such as Homenaje a la Cultura Totonaca (Tribute to Totonac Culture), depicting the history of Papantla from the pre-Hispanic era to the present day. It was created by Cano along with sculptors Rivera Diaz, Contreras García and Vidal Espejel in 1979, measuring 84 m x four m (275.59 ft x 13.12 ft).

In an interview in 2007, Cano stated that he considers his work to be instructive, meant for those with little knowledge of the arts, focusing on happy elements such as dance. This, he said, is in contrast with much of modern art, which can turn off many who see it for the first time.

In addition to his artistic career, Cano has had an academic career, mostly associated with the Universidad Veracruzana (UV) in Poza Rica. In 1960, he founded the Escuela de Pintura (School of Painting) in conjunction with the Secretariat of Public Education in Poza Rica. He cofounded and directed the Escuela de Artesanías (School of Handicrafts and Folk Art) in Coatepec . In 1969, he began with UV as director of the Taller Libre de Arte (Open Art Workshop) in Poza Rica. Ten years later he founded the Talleres Libres de Arte de Papantla, associated with the University, which has trained hundreds of young artists in various specialties. In 1988, he became the director of the Casa de Cultura (Cultural Center) of Papantla, a position he currently maintains.

Since graduating from the San Carlos Academy, Cano has received numerous awards for his artistic and academic work. The most recent awards include one from a business group in Poza Rica in 2005, one from a petroleum workers union and one from UV in 2006, in addition to the Adolfo Ruiz Cortinez Medal awarded by the Veracruz state government in 2007. He is also one of only a few artists in Mexico to have had a museum dedicated to his works while still alive.

Although retired from academia, Cano continues his artistic career based in Xalapa, Veracruz. In 2010, he exhibited a photographic collection along with conferences about vanilla, a flower and seed pod native to Papantla, which has given it the nickname of La Ciudad que Perfuma al Mundo (The City that Perfumes the World) .
