= XHMTV-FM =

Radio station in Minatitlán, Veracruz, Mexico

- Minatitlán, Veracruz; Mexico
- Frequency: 100.9 FM
- Branding: El Lobo de Mina

Programming
- Format: Regional Mexican

Ownership
- Owner: Núcleo Radio Mina; (Oscar Bravo, S.A. de C.V.)
- Sister stations: XHKM-FM

History
- First air date: October 14, 1983; 1994 (FM)
- Former frequencies: XEMTV-AM 1260 (1983–2021)
- Call sign meaning: "Minatitlán, Veracruz"

Technical information
- ERP: 10 kW

Links
- Webcast: Listen live
- Website: gruporadiomina.com

XHMTV-FM (100.9 MHz) is a radio station in Minatitlán, Veracruz. It is owned by Núcleo Radio Mina known as El Lobo de Mina, carrying a Regional Mexican format.

== History ==
The concession for XEMTV-AM 1260 was awarded in 1983 to Jesús Adelaido Oscar Bravo Santos, reactivating the 1260 frequency vacated by XEDW-AM in 1969. The station was originally a daytimer broadcasting with 250 watts of power. It added the FM station in 1994.

In 2007, the station was transferred to Oscar Bravo, S.A. de C.V.

On November 17, 2021, Oscar Bravo, S.A. de C.V., surrendered the station's authority to operate on AM, becoming an FM-only station.
