= Radiomás =

Public radio network of the Mexican state of Veracruz

- Xalapa; Mexico
- Broadcast area: Veracruz
- Frequency: (see table)

Programming
- Format: Public radio

Ownership
- Owner: Government of the State of Veracruz
- Sister stations: TVMÁS

History
- First air date: April 6, 2000

Technical information
- Licensing authority: CRT
- Class: (see table)
- ERP: (see table)
- HAAT: (see table)

Links
- Webcast: Radiomás
- Website: www.radiomas.mx

Radiomás is the state radio network of the Mexican state of Veracruz. It broadcasts on five FM transmitters in the state with most content originating from the state capital in Xalapa.

== History ==
Radiomás came to air on April 6, 2000, with music and pre-recorded IDs. Program production began by that July.

== Transmitters ==
Callsign	Frequency	Location	Class	ERP	HAAT
XHZUL-FM	106.5	Cerro Azul	C1	7.5 kW	825.50 m (2,708.3 ft)
XHTAN-FM	101.3	Huayacocotla	C1	4.94 kW	825.50 m (2,708.3 ft)
XHOTE-FM	95.7	Mecayapan	B	50 kW	158.00 m (518.37 ft)
XHOBA-FM	105.5	Orizaba	B	4.97 kW	225.80 m (740.8 ft)
XHXAL-FM	107.7	Xalapa	C	30 kW	842.30 m (2,763.5 ft)

The two lowest-powered transmitters in the network, XHIXH-FM 107.3 Ixhuatlán de Madero (400 watts) and XHSTX-FM 89.7 Santiago Tuxtla (167 watts), were shut down and their permits surrendered on December 21, 2016.
