= XHTS-FM =

Radio station in Veracruz, Veracruz, Mexico

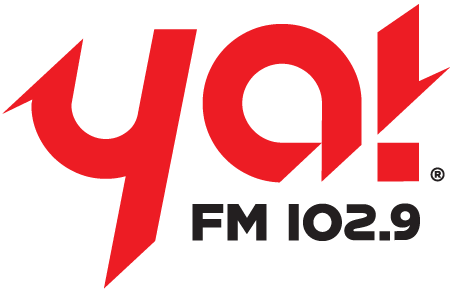
- Veracruz, Veracruz; Mexico
- Frequency: 102.9 FM
- Branding: Ya! FM

Programming
- Format: Contemporary hit radio

Ownership
- Owner: Grupo Pazos Radio; (Radio Tipo, S.A.)
- Sister stations: XHLL-FM, XHHV-FM, XHU-FM

History
- First air date: June 13, 1972 (concession)

Technical information
- Licensing authority: CRT
- Class: B
- ERP: 25 kW
- HAAT: 49 meters
- Transmitter coordinates: 19°11′44.7″N 96°08′08.5″W

Links
- Webcast: Listen live
- Website: ya.fm

XHTS-FM is a radio station on 102.9 FM in Veracruz, Veracruz, Mexico. It is owned by Grupo Pazos Radio and is known as Ya! FM with a Contemporary hit radio format.

== History ==
XHTS received its concession on June 13, 1972. It was owned by Vicente Capillo Rocha with an ERP of 28 kW. It was sold to Radio Tipo in 1983.

By May 2002, Radio Núcleo Oro (now Grupo Pazos Radio) decided to evolve its concept into 102.9 FM, resulting in the station's name to change from Stereo Oro to Ya! FM.
