= WAIZ =

- Hickory, North Carolina; United States
- Frequency: 630 kHz
- Branding: 63 Big Ways

Programming
- Format: Oldies

Ownership
- Owner: Newton-Conover Communications, Inc

History
- First air date: December 5, 1948
- Former call signs: WIRC (1948–2003)

Technical information
- Licensing authority: FCC
- Facility ID: 20323
- Class: D
- Power: 1,000 watts (day); 57 watts (night)
- Transmitter coordinates: 35°43′22.00″N 81°16′41.00″W
- Translator: 105.9 W290CW (Hickory)

Links
- Public license information: Public file; LMS
- Webcast: Listen live
- Website: mytotalradio.com/waiz/index.html

WAIZ (630 AM) is a radio station broadcasting an oldies format to the Hickory, North Carolina, United States, area. The station is currently owned by Pacific Broadcast Group, Inc. and identifies itself as "63 Big Ways." The format recreates a format resembling a 1960s Top 40 station by using the jingles and other airchecks from WAYS (which was the original "Big Ways"), a legendary Charlotte Top 40 station from the 1960s. Since the callsign and frequency of the original "Big Ways" was different, the jingles and airchecks used are those that feature the words "Big Ways" rather than the actual callsign or frequency. WAIZ's music is drawn largely from the late 1950s and early 1960s, an era largely ignored by many oldies stations in their efforts to appeal to Baby Boomers. It often refers to its music as "Real Oldies". Prior to Fall 2014, the station carried broadcasts of The Elvis Only Hour, an hour of music exclusively from "The King." This program aired on Saturdays and Sundays at noon, but has since ceased production.

== History ==
WAIZ signed on on December 5, 1948, as WIRC from a transmitter site in southeast Hickory, North Carolina. In 1977 the station was sold to new owners, along with sister station WXRC. From 1980, probably earlier, until sometime after 1982, the station broadcast a country music format using the Drake-Chenault Great American Country programming service. As late as 1982, the transmitter site remained at the original location. Sometime after 1982, the owners of WIRC bought out another Hickory AM radio station. They moved the WIRC studios into those of the other station and began transmitting on 630 from the other station's transmitter site, still using the WIRC call letters. Around 1993 the station was purchased by Pacific Broadcast Group with the studio facilities combined with sister station WNNC.

In 2016, WAIZ installed an FM translator on 105.9 MHz running 250 watts.
