= XHU-FM =

Radio station in Veracruz, Veracruz, Mexico

- Veracruz, Veracruz; Mexico
- Frequency: 98.1 FM
- Branding: XEU

Programming
- Format: News/talk, Tropical music

Ownership
- Owner: Grupo Pazos Radio; (Eco de Sotavento, S.A.)
- Sister stations: XHLL-FM, XHHV-FM, XHTS-FM

History
- First air date: December 1930
- Former call signs: XEU-AM
- Former frequencies: 930 kHz

Technical information
- Licensing authority: CRT
- Class: B1
- ERP: 25 kW
- HAAT: 49.20 m
- Transmitter coordinates: 19°07′57.5″N 96°07′50″W

Links
- Webcast: Listen live
- Website: xeu.mx

XHU-FM is a radio station on 98.1 FM in Veracruz, Veracruz, Mexico. It is owned by Grupo Pazos Radio and is known as XEU with a news/talk format and Tropical music in Spanish.

== History ==
XEU-AM signed on the air in December 1930. The station received its concession on December 1, 1932, the first day concessions were issued for broadcast stations. It broadcast on 1010 kilohertz and was owned by Fernando Pazos y Compañía. By the late 1960s, after Pazos's death in 1967, the station had moved to 930 kHz. Ultimately, the concession was transferred to a new corporation owned by the Pazos family, which had expanded by acquiring XELL and XEHV in 1964.

In November 2010, XEU received approval to move to FM on 98.1 MHz. While its callsign is XHU-FM, an alteration made in all AM-FM migrations, it continues to brand as XEU.
