= XHPR-FM (Poza Rica, Veracruz) =

Radio station in Poza Rica, Veracruz, Mexico

XEPR-AM/XHPR-FM
- Papantla, Veracruz (AM) Poza Rica, Veracruz (FM); Mexico
- Frequencies: 1020 kHz; 102.7 MHz
- Branding: Globo

Programming
- Format: Romantic
- Affiliations: MVS Radio

Ownership
- Owner: Marcos López Zamora; (Compañia Radiofónica de Poza Rica, S.A. de C.V.)
- Sister stations: XHPW-FM, XHRIC-FM

History
- First air date: March 17, 1953
- Former frequencies: 1480 kHz (to 1994)
- Call sign meaning: Poza Rica

Technical information
- Licensing authority: CRT
- Class: B1 (FM); B (AM)
- Power: 5 kW day.5 kW night
- ERP: 10 kW
- HAAT: 43.20 m

Links
- Webcast: Listen live
- Website: fmglobo.com

XEPR-AM 1020/XHPR-FM 102.7 is a radio station in Poza Rica, Veracruz, Mexico. The station carries the Globo romantic format from MVS Radio.

== History ==
Logo as Los 40 Principales, used from 2008 to 2015

XEPR began broadcasting on March 17, 1953, on 1480 kHz. The original studios featured a mural by Teodoro Cano García depicting the history of oil. The station was granted an FM combo frequency in 1994.

In February 2021, Éxtasis Digital moved to XHCOV-FM 105.9 as a result of the announced sale of XHPR-FM and XHPW-FM by Grupo Radiorama to Marcos López Zamora, the owner of XHRIC-FM 101.9, who immediately took over operation of both frequencies.

On March 21, weeks after the purchase, MVS Radio's FM Globo romantic format started.
