= XHGMS-FM =

Radio station in Martínez de la Torre, Veracruz

- Martínez de la Torre, Veracruz, Mexico; Mexico
- Broadcast area: Martínez de la Torre, Veracruz
- Frequency: 104.5 FM
- Branding: 104.5 FM Sólo Hits

Programming
- Format: Pop and Adult contemporary

Ownership
- Owner: Grupo MS Multimedios; (Pedro, María Elisa, María Teresa, José Manuel and Luis Miguel Manterola Sainz)
- Sister stations: XHHU-FM, XHHTY-FM

History
- First air date: August 30, 1979 (concession)
- Former call signs: XEHU-FM (1972–2019)
- Call sign meaning: Grupo MS

Technical information
- Class: B1
- ERP: 14.5 kW
- HAAT: 12.3 m
- Transmitter coordinates: 20°2′59.2″N 97°0′3″W

Links
- Website: www.msnoticias.com

XHGMS-FM is a radio station on 104.5 FM in Martínez de la Torre, Veracruz. The station is owned by Grupo MS Multimedios, the business of the Manterola Sainz family, and carries a pop and adult contemporary format known as 104.5 FM Sólo Hits.

== History ==
XEHU-FM received its concession on June 29, 1972. It was highly unusual as the only FM radio station in southern Mexico to carry an XE callsign. The callsign came from co-owned XEHU-AM 1300, which migrated to FM as XHHU-FM 89.9.

On January 29, 2019, the station officially became XHGMS-FM, though the station had unofficially used those call letters since at least 2012.
