= XHQO-FM =

Radio station in Cosamaloapan, Veracruz

- Cosamaloapan, Veracruz; Mexico
- Frequency: 90.7 FM
- Branding: QO Romance

Programming
- Format: Romantic

Ownership
- Owner: Grupo Emisoras de Sotavento, S. de R.L. de C.V.; (Voz Amiga de la Cuenca del Papaloapan, S.A. de C.V.)
- Sister stations: XHFU-FM

History
- First air date: November 11, 1972 (concession)

Technical information
- Licensing authority: CRT
- Class: B1
- ERP: 25 kW
- HAAT: 65.82 m
- Transmitter coordinates: 18°21′30″N 95°48′53″W

Links
- Webcast: Listen live
- Website: xefuradio.mx

XHQO-FM is a radio station on 90.7 FM in Cosamaloapan, Veracruz, known as QO Romance.

== History ==
XEQO-AM 980 received its concession on November 11, 1972. It broadcast with 5,000 watts and was owned by Zoila Muñoz de Aguirre. The family still owns the station today.

XEQO moved to FM in 2012 as XHQO-FM 90.7.
