= XHRRR-FM (Veracruz) =

Radio station in Papantla, Veracruz, Mexico

- Papantla, Veracruz; Mexico
- Frequency: 89.3 FM
- Branding: @FM

Programming
- Format: Pop

Ownership
- Owner: Radiorama; (Radio Club, S.A. de C.V.)
- Sister stations: XHTU-FM, XHCRA-FM, XHTVR-FM, XHEJD-FM, XHPV-FM, XHCOV-FM

History
- First air date: 1957

Technical information
- ERP: 10 kW
- HAAT: 144.5 meters
- Transmitter coordinates: 20°26′52″N 97°19′03″W; 20°28′40.9″N 97°01′0.05″W (booster)
- Translators: XHRRR-FM Tecolutla, Ver. (300 watts)

Links
- Website: arroba.fm/pozarica radioramapozarica.mx

XHRRR-FM is a radio station in Papantla, Veracruz, Mexico. Owned by Radiorama, XHRRR broadcasts on 89.3 MHz from a tower on Cerro El Comanche and carries its @FM pop format.

== History ==
The station began its life as XEPV-AM 1270, with a concession awarded to Andrés Ebergenyi Belgodere in September 1957. In the 1980s, the station became XERRR-AM; its sister station on 1170 (now XHPV-FM), which had been XEEU, took on the XEPV calls.

The station migrated to FM in the early 2010s. It is one of two stations with the XHRRR callsign; the other is located in Encarnación de Díaz, Jalisco.
