= XHFTI-FM =

Radio station in Fortín de las Flores, Veracruz, Mexico

- Fortín de las Flores, Veracruz; Mexico
- Broadcast area: Metropolitan area of Córdoba including Orizaba and Fortín de las Flores
- Frequency: 89.5 MHz
- Branding: La Lupe

Programming
- Format: Variety hits

Ownership
- Owner: Multimedios Radio; (Radio Informativa, S.A. de C.V.)

History
- First air date: January 31, 1994 (concession)
- Call sign meaning: "Fortín"

Technical information
- Class: C1
- ERP: 60 kW
- HAAT: 214.2 m

Links
- Website: Multimedios radio official website

XHFTI-FM is a radio station on 89.5 FM in Fortín de las Flores, Veracruz, Mexico, serving the Córdoba market. It is owned by Multimedios Radio and carries its La Lupe variety hits format.

== History ==
XHFTI received its concession on January 31, 1994. It was owned by Susana Rodríguez Díaz and was part of the Grupo FM Multimedios family. It was sold to Frecuencia Modulada de Fortín in 2000 and raised its power from 3 kW to 60. It was known as "Láser 89" until August 2008, when the station became a franchise of the Los 40 Principales pop format. This lasted until December 2011, and after an interregnum of being called "89.5 FM", the station rebranded as Vive FM on May 7, 2012.

In late 2015, Grupo FM split into two concerns owned by different parts of the same family, Grupo FM and Radio Networks; RN owned the latter station along with XHRN-FM and XHTD-FM and programmed all three stations with a tropical music format known as Más Latina.

On August 17, 2017, XHFTI flipped to the La Caliente grupera format, beginning an association with Multimedios Radio. Multimedios bought the station outright in a transaction approved by the Federal Telecommunications Institute in November 2018.

All three Multimedios stations in Veracruz flipped from La Caliente to La Lupe on November 6, 2020.
