= XHLL-FM =

Radio station in Veracruz, Veracruz, Mexico

- Veracruz, Veracruz; Mexico
- Frequency: 90.1 MHz
- RDS: FUSION
- Branding: Fusión

Programming
- Format: English and Spanish adult contemporary music

Ownership
- Owner: Grupo Pazos Radio; (Radio Jarocha, S.A.)
- Sister stations: XHHV-FM, XHTS-FM, XHU-FM

History
- First air date: October 20, 1946 (concession)
- Former call signs: XELL-AM
- Former frequencies: 1430 kHz

Technical information
- Licensing authority: CRT
- Class: B1
- ERP: 25 kW
- HAAT: 49.20 m
- Transmitter coordinates: 19°07′57.5″N 96°07′50″W

Links
- Webcast: Listen live
- Website: www.fusionradio.mx/index.cfm

XHLL-FM is a radio station on 90.1 FM in Veracruz, Veracruz, Mexico. It is owned by Grupo Pazos Radio and carries english and spanish adult contemporary music as Fusión.

== History ==
XELL-AM 1430 received its first concession on August 23, 1946, signing on October 20. It was owned by Dolores G. Ferreira and broadcast with 250 watts. On March 14, 1951, XELL was sold to Carlos Ferráez Matos, and two years later, Julio César Orozco y García bought the station.

By the 1960s, it had increased its daytime power to 5,000 watts. 1967 saw the acquisition of XELL by Esperanza Navarro de Núñez, who promptly transferred it to Radio Jarocha in 1968. XELL's power revised back down in the 1980s to 500, but in the 2000s it was raised to 5,000 watts day and 1,000 night.

In 2010, XELL was cleared for AM-FM migration.

The station has been called as Radio Onda (1430 AM), Latido (90.1 FM) and Fusión.
