= XHPTLA-FM =

Radio station in San Andrés Tuxtla, Veracruz

San Andrés Tuxtla, Veracruz; Mexico
- Frequency: 104.7 FM
- Branding: Mezkla FM

Programming
- Format: Pop

Ownership
- Owner: Mezkla FM, S.A. de C.V.

History
- First air date: February 2, 2018
- Call sign meaning: San Andrés TuxTLA

Technical information
- Class: AA
- ERP: 5.626 kW
- HAAT: 67.9 m
- Transmitter coordinates: 18°27′59.79″N 95°13′14.98″W

Links
- Website: mezklafm.com

XHPTLA-FM is a radio station on 104.7 FM in San Andrés Tuxtla, Veracruz. It is known as Mezkla FM.

== History ==
XHPTLA was awarded in the IFT-4 radio auction of 2017 and came to air on February 2, 2018. Mezkla is owned by Rafael Fararoni Mortera, a local beer distributor and politician.
