= XHAVR-FM =

Radio station in Alvarado–Veracruz, Veracruz, Mexico

- Alvarado, Veracruz; Mexico
- Broadcast area: Veracruz
- Frequency: 89.1 FM
- Branding: Radio Fórmula

Programming
- Format: News/talk

Ownership
- Owner: Grupo Fórmula; (Transmisora Regional Radio Fórmula, S.A. de C.V.)
- Sister stations: XHETF-FM

History
- First air date: June 27, 1983
- Former call signs: XEAVR-AM
- Former frequencies: 1540 kHz, 720 kHz
- Call sign meaning: AlVaRado

Technical information
- Licensing authority: CRT
- Class: B1
- ERP: 25 kW
- HAAT: 104.70 m
- Transmitter coordinates: 19°04′31.50″N 96°05′21.55″W

Links
- Webcast: Listen live
- Website: radioformula.com.mx

XHAVR-FM is a radio station on 89.1 FM in Alvarado, Veracruz, Mexico. It carries the news/talk programming of Radio Fórmula.

== History ==
XEAVR-AM 1540 received its first concession on June 27, 1983. It was owned by Tomás Tejeda Lagos and broadcast as a 5 kW daytimer. In the 1990s, XEAVR was sold to Comunicación Radial del Golfo, S.A. de C.V. It also began broadcasting on 720 kHz with 10 kW day and 250 watts night.

XEAVR was transferred to the current concessionaire in 2007 and approved to migrate to FM in 2012.
