= XHEOM-FM =

Radio station in Coatzacoalcos, Veracruz

- Coatzacoalcos, Veracruz; Mexico
- Frequency: 98.5 MHz
- Branding: Radio Fórmula

Programming
- Format: News/talk

Ownership
- Owner: Radio Fórmula; (Transmisora Regional Radio Fórmula, S.A. de C.V.)

History
- First air date: May 18, 1950 (concession)
- Former call signs: XEOM-AM
- Former frequencies: 1340 kHz, 590 kHz

Technical information
- Licensing authority: CRT
- Class: B1
- ERP: 25 kW
- HAAT: 95.87 meters
- Transmitter coordinates: 18°06′29″N 94°27′11″W

Links
- Website: radioformulacoatzacoalcos.com

XHEOM-FM is a radio station on 98.5 FM in Coatzacoalcos, Veracruz, Mexico. It is an owned and operated station of Radio Fórmula.

== History ==
XEOM-AM 1340 received its concession on May 18, 1950. Owned by Radio Coatzacoalcos, S.A., XEOM broadcast with 1,000 watts day and 250 night. The station was later sold to Radio Fórmula and moved to 590 kHz, with a power of 1 kW day and night.

XEOM was cleared for AM-FM migration in 2010 as XHEOM-FM 98.5. It was the second time XEOM had expanded to the FM band. In 1961, an effort to build FM stations for some existing AM stations produced XEOM-FM 88.4, which is now separately owned XHOM-FM 107.5.

From 2017 to 2020, XHEOM-FM broadcast Trión, Radio Fórmula's alternative rock format.
