= XHHV-FM =

Radio station in Veracruz, Veracruz, Mexico

- Veracruz, Veracruz; Mexico
- Frequency: 94.1 MHz
- Branding: La Fiera

Programming
- Format: Regional Mexican

Ownership
- Owner: Grupo Pazos Radio; (Radio Heróica, S.A.)
- Sister stations: XHLL-FM, XHTS-FM, XHU-FM

History
- First air date: April 2, 1940
- Former call signs: XEHV-AM
- Former frequencies: 1310 kHz
- Call sign meaning: "Heroica Veracruz"

Technical information
- Licensing authority: CRT
- Class: B1
- ERP: 25 kW
- HAAT: 49.20 m
- Transmitter coordinates: 19°07′57.5″N 96°07′50″W

Links
- Website: www.lafiera.mx/index.cfm

XHHV-FM is a Mexican radio station on 94.1 FM in Veracruz, Veracruz. It is owned by Grupo Pazos Radio and carries a Regional Mexican format known as La Fiera.

== History ==
XEHV-AM 1310 began broadcasting on April 2, 1940. It was owned by Juan A. Palavicini and broadcast with 1,000 watts. Miguel Núñez Carrillo owned the station from 1954 to 1966. In the 1990s, it raised its power to 2,500 watts during the day.

In 2010, XEHV was cleared for an AM-FM migration.
