= Banderilla, Veracruz =

Banderilla
- Municipality
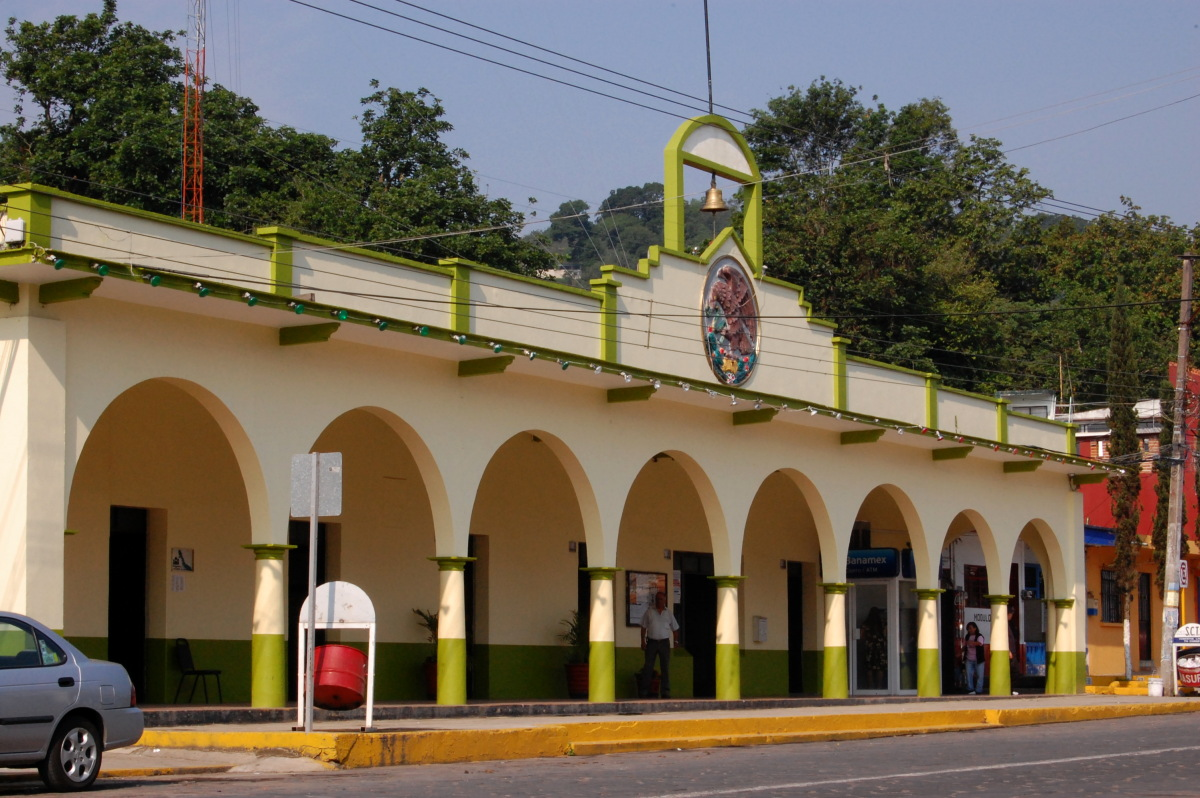
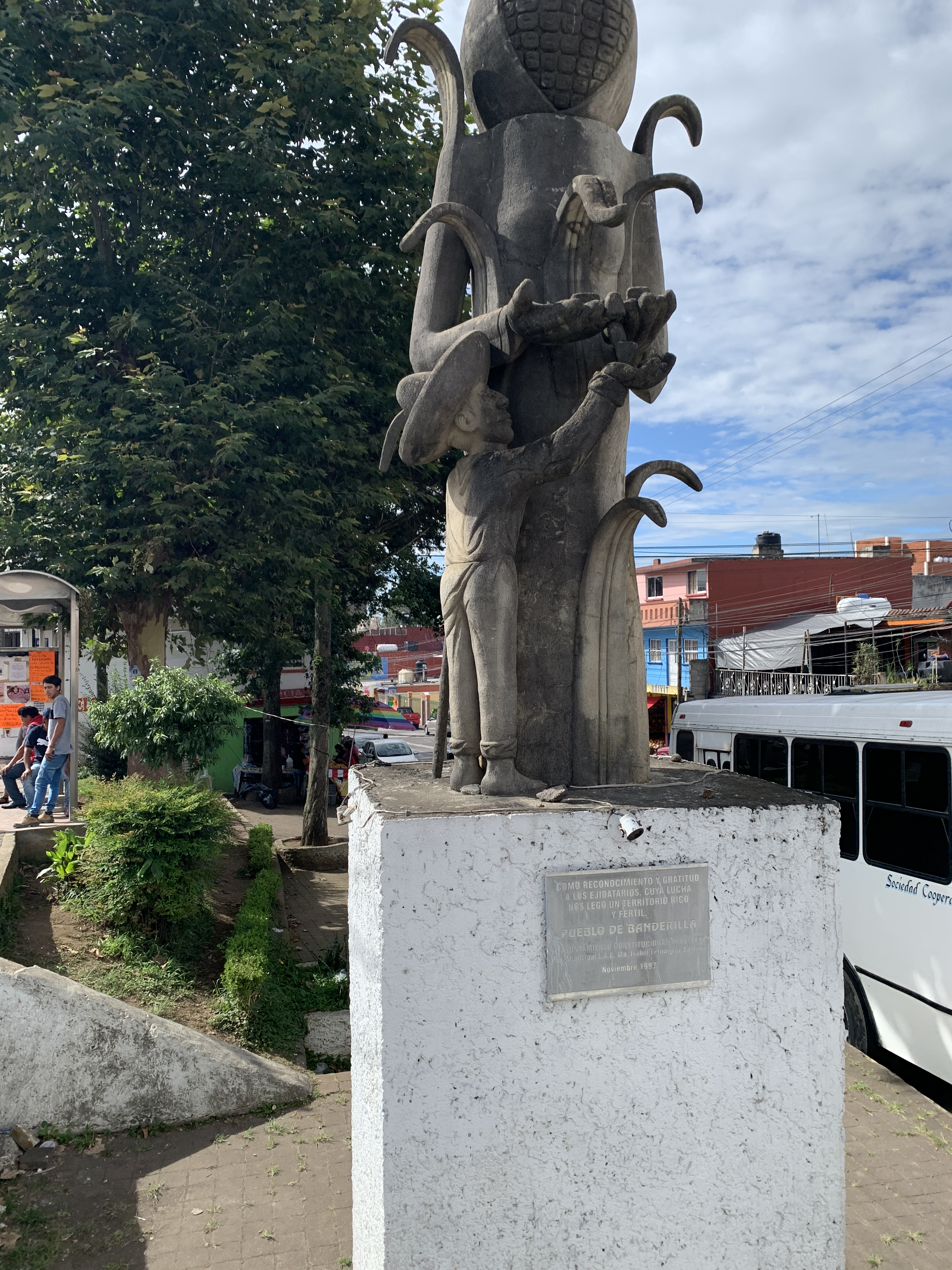
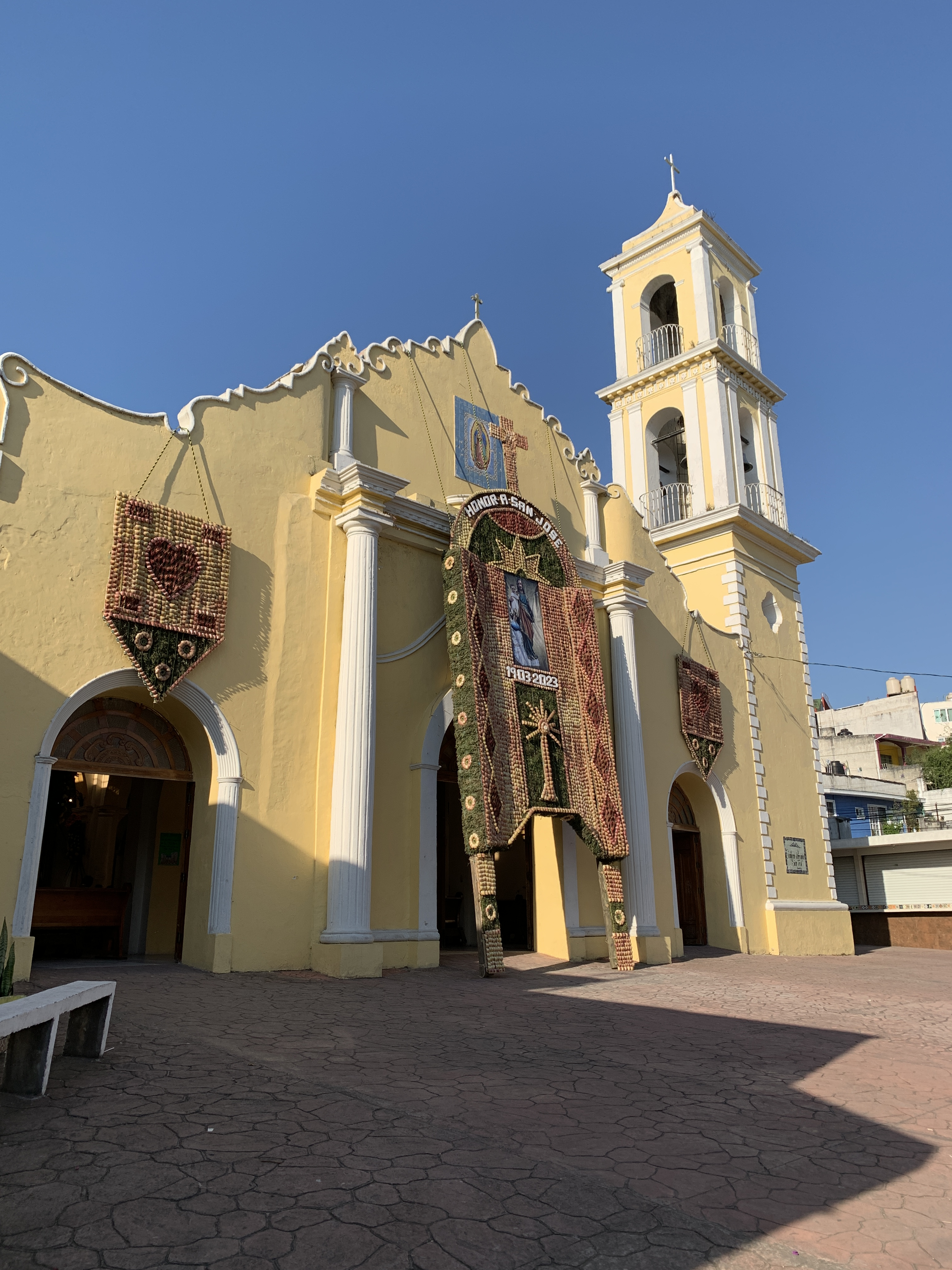
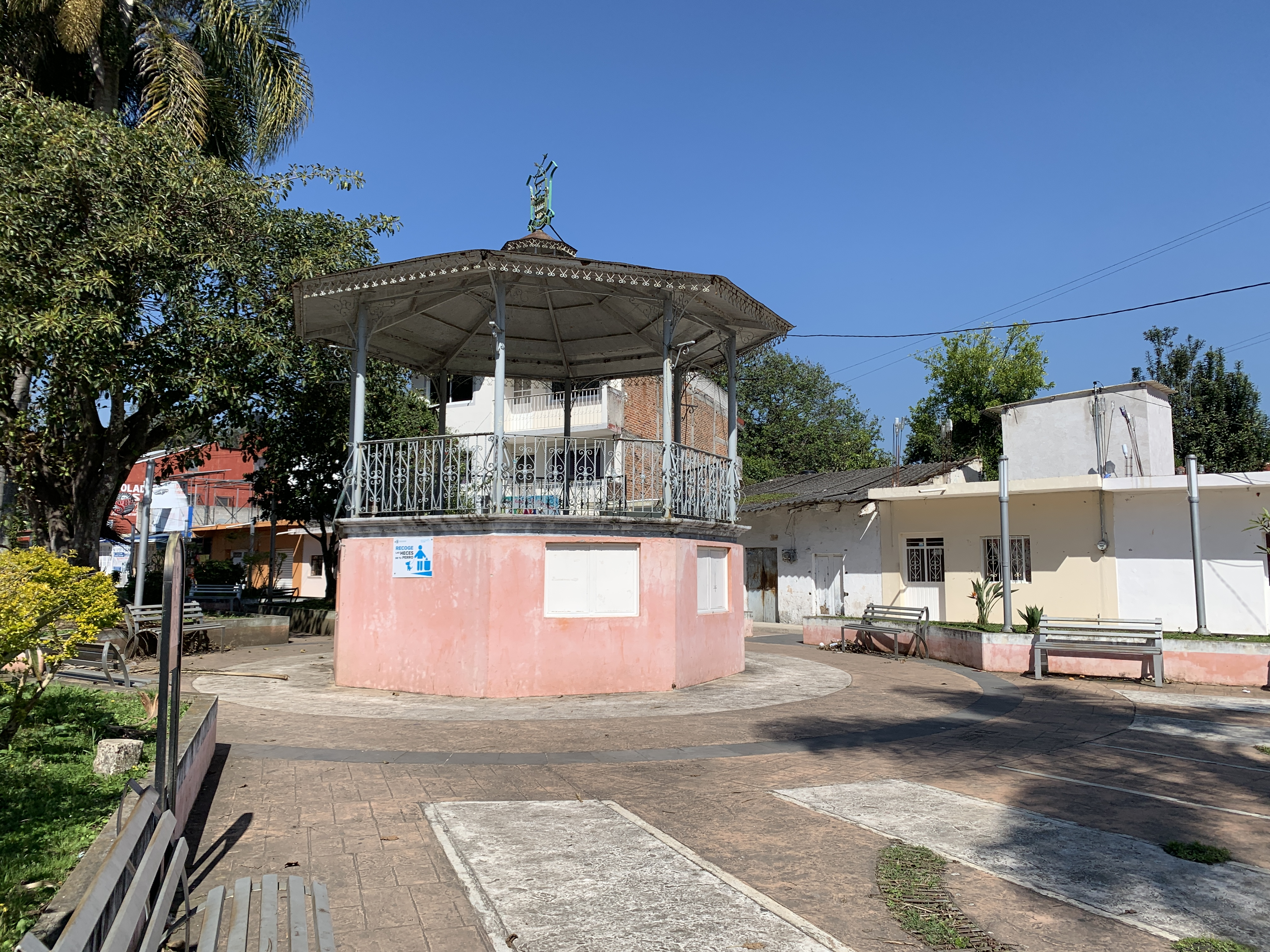
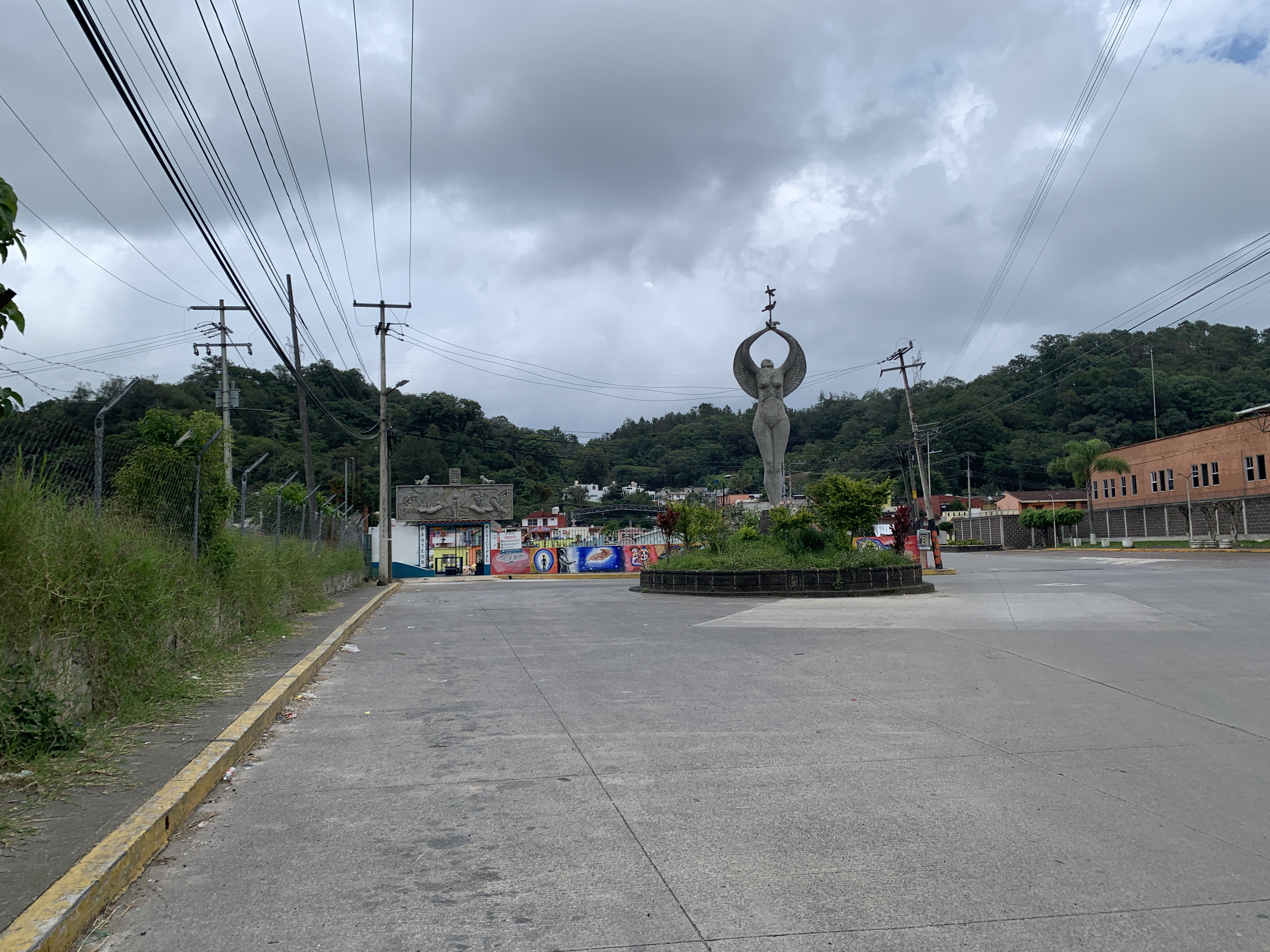
- Top: Banderilla Municipal Palace; Middle: Maize sculpture, San José Church; Bottom: Banderilla main plaza, Banderilla Downtown

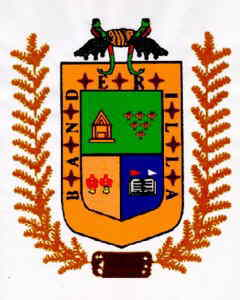
- Coat of arms

- Location in Mexico Banderilla (Mexico)
- Coordinates: 19°35′00″N 96°56′00″W
- Country: Mexico
- State: Veracruz
- Region: Capital Region
- Municipal seat and largest town: Banderilla

Government
  - Mayor: David San Gabriel Bonilla (PRD)

Area
  - Total: 19.8 km^{2} (7.6 sq mi)
- Elevation (of seat): 1,536 m (5,039 ft)

Population (2020)
  - Total: 25,993
  - Density: 1,310.1/km^{2} (3,393/sq mi)
  - Seat: 22,760
- Time zone: UTC-6 (Central (US Central))
- Postal code (of seat): 91300
- Website: (in Spanish) https://www.banderilla.gob.mx/

Historical population
Year	Pop.	±%
1995	33,798	—
2000	16,433	−51.4%
2005	19,170	+16.7%
2010	21,546	+12.4%
2015	24,822	+15.2%
2020	25,993	+4.7%

Banderilla is a municipality in the Mexican state of Veracruz. It is located about 9 km from the state capital, Xalapa. It has a surface area of 22.21 km^{2}. It is located at 19°35′N 96°56′W.

== Name ==
Tradition has it that the name alludes to a small flag (banderilla) that thieves would hoist on the summit of the hill of La Martinica as a signal to their accomplices that a valuable goods were being moved along the royal highway.

== Geography ==
The municipality of Banderilla is delimited to the north and northeast by Jilotepec, to the east and the south by Xalapa, and to the southeast and west by Rafael Lucio. To the municipality it is watered by tributary rivers of the Sedeño River, which in turn is a tributary of the Actopan River.

The weather in Banderilla is cold and wet all year with rains in summer and autumn.

== Demographics ==
As of 2020, the municipality had a population of 25,993 inhabitants in 29 localities. More than 87% resides in the municipal seat, Banderilla; other localities include La Haciendita (1,265 hab.), Xaltepec (1,040 hab.), Luis Donaldo Colosio (293 hab.) and Fredepo (164 hab.).

== Agriculture ==
It produces principally maize, sugarcane and coffee.

== Celebrations ==
In Banderilla , in March takes place the celebration in honor to San José, Patron of the town, and in December takes place the celebration in honor to Virgen de Guadalupe.
