= XHRN-FM =

Radio station in Veracruz and Santiago Tuxtla, Veracruz

- Veracruz, Veracruz; Mexico
- Broadcast area: Veracruz-Santiago Tuxtla
- Frequency: 96.5 FM
- Branding: Más Latina

Programming
- Format: Tropical / Contemporary hit radio

Ownership
- Owner: Radio Networks; (Frecuencia Modulada Tropical, S.A. de C.V.)

History
- First air date: July 20, 1976 (concession)
- Call sign meaning: Romeo Luis Rascón Delgado (original concessionaire)

Technical information
- Class: C
- ERP: 39.33 kW

Links
- Website: www.maslatina.com.mx

XHRN-FM is a radio station on 96.5 FM in Veracruz, Veracruz, Mexico, known as Más Latina. The station is broadcast from a high-power transmitter in Santiago Tuxtla and a lower-power transmitter in the city of Veracruz.

== History ==
XHRN received its concession on July 20, 1976. It was owned by Romeo Luis Rascón Delgado and broadcast with an ERP of 10 kW.

In October 1993, it was sold to Frecuencia Modulada Tropical and increased its ERP to nearly 40 kW.

XHRN became a franchise of the Ke Buena national format from Televisa Radio in August 2008, returning to its prior branding in September 2011.

In 2015, Grupo FM Multimedios split into two companies owned by separate members of the same family, with the group owning XHRN calling itself Radio Networks. Radio Networks owned XHRN, XHFTI-FM in the Córdoba market, and XHTD-FM in Coatzacoalcos, all branded Más Latina.

In 2015, XHRN was approved to broadcast in HD Radio.

== Transmitters ==
XHRN-FM is broadcast simultaneously from two main transmitters, one in the city of Veracruz and another atop Cerro del Vigía in Santiago Tuxtla.

Location	ERP kW	Height m	Transmitter coordinates
Veracruz	1.976	52.44	19°10′12″N 96°08′20″W
Santiago Tuxtla	39.33	696.5	18°27′25″N 95°21′01″W
