= XHETF-FM =

Radio station in Veracruz, Veracruz, Mexico

- Veracruz, Veracruz; Mexico
- Frequency: 106.1 MHz
- Branding: Trión

Programming
- Format: English rock

Ownership
- Owner: Grupo Fórmula; (Transmisora Regional Radio Fórmula, S.A. de C.V.)
- Sister stations: XHAVR-FM

History
- First air date: July 4, 1934 (concession); August 4, 1936 (concession key)
- Former call signs: XETF-AM
- Former frequencies: 1220 kHz, 1250 kHz

Technical information
- Licensing authority: CRT
- Class: B1
- ERP: 25 kWs
- HAAT: 71.3 m
- Transmitter coordinates: 19°10′44.6″N 96°09′05.9″W

Links
- Website: trion.fm Radio Fórmula Veracruz

XHETF-FM is a radio station on 106.1 FM in Veracruz, Veracruz, in Mexico. It is owned by Radio Fórmula and carries its Trión format.

== History ==
XETF-AM received its first concession on July 4, 1934. The 12-watt station, the first in the port of Veracruz, operated on 1220 kHz and was owned by José Rodríguez López. After his death, ownership passed to Isabel Díaz Vda. de Rodríguez. The station also moved to 1250 kHz, where it would remain until migration, with a power of 1,000 watts day and 500 watts night. In the 1980s, power dropped back to 500 watts.

In 1999, the concession was awarded to Juan de Dios Rodríguez Díaz and Miguel Rodríguez Saez. The two sold the station to Radio Fórmula in 2002. Fórmula restored power to 1 kW.

In March 2017, XHETF and three other Radio Fórmula FM stations flipped to the Trión format.
