= XHPAV-FM =

Radio station in Pueblo Viejo, Veracruz serving Tampico, Tamaulipas, Mexico

- Pueblo Viejo, Veracruz; Mexico
- Broadcast area: Tampico, Tamaulipas
- Frequency: 91.7 MHz
- RDS: FIESTA
- Branding: Fiesta Mexicana

Programming
- Language: Spanish
- Format: Regional Mexican

Ownership
- Owner: Grupo Radiorama; (XEPAV-AM, S.A. de C.V.)
- Sister stations: XHETU-FM, XHEOLA-FM, XHPP-FM

History
- First air date: October 4, 1994
- Former call signs: XEPAV-AM
- Former frequencies: 1540 kHz, 1030 kHz
- Call sign meaning: Pánuco Veracruz

Technical information
- Licensing authority: CRT
- Class: B1
- ERP: 12.5 kWs
- HAAT: 81 m (266 ft)
- Transmitter coordinates: 22°14′37.81″N 97°52′27.07″W

Links
- Webcast: Listen live
- Website: www.radiorama.mx/aradios.php?id=242 www.bienydefiesta.com/tampico

XHPAV-FM (branded as Fiesta Mexicana) is a Mexican Spanish-language FM radio station that serves the Tampico, Tamaulipas, Mexico, area. It is licensed to Pueblo Viejo, Veracruz but its transmitter and studio facilities are in Tampico.

== History ==
XHPAV logo as La Picuda, used until 2017

XEPAV-AM 1540 was licensed to Radiorama subsidiary Mensajes Musicales, S.A., on October 4, 1994. Soon after, it moved to 1030 kHz.

In 2011, XEPAV migrated to FM on 91.7 MHz. In 2015, it was authorized to move its transmitter to a new facility in Tampico.

In 2017, XHPAV changed its name to Fiesta Mexicana, using the positioning used in other Radiorama clusters.
