= XHHTY-FM =

Radio station in Martínez de la Torre–Tlapacoyan, Veracruz, Mexico

- Martínez de la Torre, Veracruz, Mexico; Mexico
- Broadcast area: Tlapacoyan, Veracruz
- Frequency: 107.1 MHz
- Branding: La Ke Buena

Programming
- Format: Grupera
- Affiliations: Radiópolis

Ownership
- Owner: Diego Arrazola Becerra
- Operator: Grupo MS Multimedios
- Sister stations: XHHU-FM, XHGMS-FM

History
- First air date: December 1, 1965 (concession)
- Former call signs: XEUZ-AM, XEHTY-AM
- Former frequencies: 1330 kHz, 1110 kHz

Technical information
- ERP: 10 kW
- Transmitter coordinates: 19°57′42″N 97°12′55″W

XHHTY-FM is a radio station on 107.1 FM in Martínez de la Torre, Veracruz. The station is the local franchise of the Ke Buena grupera format from Radiópolis.

== History ==
XEUZ-AM 1330 received its concession on December 1, 1965. It was a 1,000-watt station. In the early 2000s, XEUZ became XEHTY-AM, which broadcast for a time on 1100 kHz and then migrated to FM in November 2010.

On February 24, 2020, XHHTY dropped La Mejor, the grupera format from MVS Radio, and began simply identifying as "107.1". In mid-March, it officially became Ke Buena.
