= XHYV-FM =

Radio station in Córdoba, Veracruz

- Fortín-Córdoba, Veracruz; Mexico
- Frequency: 94.5 FM
- Branding: El Patrón

Programming
- Format: Grupera

Ownership
- Owner: Grupo Oliva Radio; (Radio Variedades, S.A. de C.V.)
- Sister stations: XHBD-FM, XHTP-FM

History
- First air date: August 14, 1969 (concession)
- Former call signs: XEYV-AM
- Former frequencies: 880 kHz, 1180 kHz

Technical information
- Licensing authority: CRT
- Class: B1
- ERP: 15 kW
- HAAT: 218.40 m
- Transmitter coordinates: 18°54′44″N 96°58′38″W

Links
- Website: elpatronfm.mx

XHYV-FM is a radio station on 94.5 FM in Mexico's Córdoba, Veracruz. It is owned by Grupo Oliva Radio and known as El Patrón with a grupera format.

== History ==
XEYV-AM 1180, a 250-watt daytimer based in Huatusco, received its concession on August 14, 1969. It was owned by Rosa Sofia Ruiz Ahumada. In the 1990s, XEYV moved to 880 kHz from Coscomatepec, allowing it to raise power from 1,000 to 5,000 watts.

XEYV was authorized to move to FM in November 2010.
