= XHOV-FM =

Radio station in Ixhuatlancillo, Veracruz, Mexico

- Ixhuatlancillo, Veracruz, Mexico; Mexico
- Broadcast area: Orizaba, Veracruz
- Frequency: 97.3 MHz
- Branding: Ke Buena

Programming
- Format: Regional Mexican
- Affiliations: Radiópolis

Ownership
- Owner: ROGSA; (XEOV, S.A.)
- Sister stations: XHTQ-FM

History
- First air date: October 11, 1967 (concession)
- Call sign meaning: Orizaba, Veracruz

Technical information
- ERP: 3 kW
- Transmitter coordinates: 18°52′45.5″N 97°07′37.7″W

Links
- Website: rogsa.mx

XHOV-FM is a radio station on 97.3 FM in Ixhuatlancillo, Veracruz, Mexico, serving the Orizaba area. It is the local franchise of the Ke Buena Regional Mexican format from Radiópolis.

== History ==
XHOV as La Picosa to late October 2022

XEOV-AM 1240 received its concession on October 11, 1967. It was owned by Veracruz broadcasting pioneer Carlos Ferráez Matos and broadcast as a daytimer on 1240 kHz. By the 1980s, it was on at night with 175 watts. Daytime power was increased to 2.5 kW by the 2000s.

XEOV was authorized to move to FM in November 2010.

On November 1, 2022, XHOV, after several years as La Picosa, became a Ke Buena station.
