= XHAFA-FM =

Radio station in Coatzacoalcos, Veracruz

Currently silent
- Nanchital, Veracruz; Mexico
- Broadcast area: Coatzacoalcos metropolitan area
- Frequency: 99.3 MHz

Ownership
- Owner: Organización Radiofónica Mexicana; (Radiodifusora XEAFA-AM, S.A. de C.V.)
- Sister stations: XHGB-FM

History
- First air date: October 30, 1971 (concession)
- Last air date: March, 25, 2026

Technical information
- Licensing authority: CRT
- Class: B1
- ERP: 25 kW
- HAAT: 85.40 m
- Transmitter coordinates: 18°04′17″N 94°24′15″W

XHAFA-FM is a radio station on 99.3 FM in Coatzacoalcos, Veracruz, Mexico, broadcasting from a transmitter at Nanchital.

== History ==
XEUY-AM 1580 received its concession on October 30, 1971. It was owned by Alberto Elorza García, who remained the concessionaire until 2015, and broadcast from Las Choapas with 250 watts day and 100 watts night. By the early 1990s, XEUY had moved to Nanchital and 690 kHz, with 2.5 kW daytime power. In 1999, the call sign was changed to XEAFA-AM.

XEAFA was cleared for AM-FM migration in 2010 as XHAFA-FM 99.3.

In April 2022, the station dropped Heraldo Radio and flipped to Activa, the format previously on XHGB-FM from 2020 to 2022.

At the beginning of July 2024, the station became an affiliate of the La Lupe format from Multimedios Radio, on February 12, 2025 Multimedios Radio and Organizacion Radiofonica Mexicana afillated La Lupe 99.3 FM during into 1 year, Organizacion Radiofonica Mexicana suspends the installations and decided to retired logos, air off during into 55 years in 2026.
