= XHHU-FM =

Radio station in Martínez de la Torre, Veracruz, Mexico

- Martínez de la Torre, Veracruz; Mexico
- Frequency: 88.9 MHz
- RDS: Los 40 Martinez de la Torre
- Branding: Los 40

Programming
- Format: Pop
- Affiliations: Radiopolis

Ownership
- Owner: Grupo MS Multimedios; (Radio Tropical, S.A. de C.V.)
- Sister stations: XHGMS-FM, XHHTY-FM

History
- First air date: March 13, 1959 (concession)

Technical information
- ERP: 25 kW
- Transmitter coordinates: 20°02′46″N 97°00′24.5″W

Links
- Website: www.los40martinez.com

XHHU-FM is a radio station on 89.9 FM in Martínez de la Torre, Veracruz. It is affiliated to the Los 40 network from Radiopolis.

== History ==
XEHU-AM 1300, a 500-watt station received its concession on March 13, 1959. Power was later raised from 500 to 5,000 watts daytime, but dropped back to 250 watts.

In the late 1970s, XEHU spawned a sister station, XEHU-FM 104.5, which was the only FM station with an XE- call sign in southern Mexico before becoming XHGMS-FM in 2019.

XEHU moved to FM in 2012 as XHHU-FM 89.9.
