= XHPB-FM =

Radio station in Veracruz, Veracruz, Mexico

- Veracruz, Veracruz; Mexico
- Frequency: 99.7 FM
- Branding: Mar FM

Programming
- Format: English classic hits

Ownership
- Owner: Grupo FM Multimedios; (Frecuencia Modulada de Veracruz, S.A. de C.V.)
- Sister stations: XHTXA-FM

History
- First air date: 1969

Technical information
- Licensing authority: CRT
- Class: B
- ERP: 49.503 kW
- HAAT: 94.10 m
- Transmitter coordinates: 19°10′12.2″N 96°08′20.3″W

Links
- Webcast: Listen live
- Website: marfm.com

XHPB-FM is a Mexican radio station on 99.7 FM in Veracruz, Veracruz, Mexico. It is owned by Grupo FM and is known as Mar FM.

== History ==
XHPB was founded by Félix Malpica Mimendi and his son Félix Malpica Valverde with the awarding of a concession on March 10, 1970. It was the first FM radio station in the Veracruz/Boca del Río area (and the first main FM service in the state, though XEOM-FM Coatzacoalcos had already received its concession), originally known as PB Stereo. The station later changed its name, first to Estéreo Mar and then to Mar FM.
