= XHFU-FM =

Radio station in Cosamaloapan, Veracruz, Mexico

XHFU-FM / XEFU-AM
- Cosamaloapan, Veracruz; Mexico
- Frequencies: 103.3 FM; 630 AM
- Branding: La FU

Programming
- Format: Regional Mexican

Ownership
- Owner: Grupo Emisoras de Sotavento; (Voz Amiga de la Cuenca del Papaloapan, S.A. de C.V.)
- Sister stations: XHQO-FM

History
- First air date: December 5, 1955; 1994 (FM)

Technical information
- Licensing authority: CRT
- Class: A (FM); B (AM)
- Power: 10 kW day/0.75 kW night
- ERP: 2.76 kW
- HAAT: 32.50 m

XHFU-FM/XEFU-AM is a combo radio station on 103.3 FM and 630 AM in Cosamaloapan, Veracruz. It is owned by Grupo Emisoras de Sotavento and known as La FU, which offers a Regional Mexican format.

== History ==
The concession for 630 AM was awarded in May 1955 to Arnulfo Aguirre Salamanca; the station officially signed on December 5 of that year with 100 watts. It would also boost its power to 5,000 watts in 1966.

1994 saw the station become an AM-FM combo.
