= XHETU-FM =

Radio station in Tampico, Mexico

- Pueblo Viejo, Veracruz; Mexico
- Broadcast area: Tampico
- Frequency: 99.3 FM
- RDS: VIDA ROM (Night) - XHTU99.3 (Day)
- Branding: Vida Romántica

Programming
- Format: Spanish adult hits

Ownership
- Owner: Grupo Radiorama; (Impulsora Moderna del Radio, S.A. de C.V.)
- Sister stations: XHPAV-FM, XHPP-FM, XHEOLA-FM

History
- First air date: November 6, 1943 (concession)
- Former call signs: XETU-AM
- Former frequencies: 1460 kHz, 980 kHz

Technical information
- Licensing authority: CRT
- Class: B1
- ERP: 12.5 kW
- HAAT: 83 m (272 ft)
- Transmitter coordinates: 22°13′33.62″N 97°49′50.63″W

Links
- Website: Listen live

XHETU-FM (branded as Vida Romántica) is a Mexican Spanish-language radio station serving Tampico, Tamaulipas as well as Tuxpan and Poza Rica, Veracruz.

== History ==
Logo as Tu Recuerdo

XETU-AM received its concession in November 1943. Originally operating on 1460 kHz, XETU moved to 980 by the 1960s and increased its daytime power to 10,000 watts.

XETU moved to FM in 2010 as XHETU-FM 99.3.
