= XHTXA-FM =

Radio station in Tuxpan, Veracruz, Mexico

- Tuxpan, Veracruz; Mexico
- Frequency: 93.9 MHz
- Branding: Soy FM 93.9

Programming
- Format: Pop

Ownership
- Owner: Grupo FM Multimedios; (Frecuencia Modulada de Tuxpam, S.A. de C.V.)
- Sister stations: XHPB-FM

History
- First air date: 1994
- Call sign meaning: TuXpAn

Technical information
- Licensing authority: CRT
- Class: B1
- ERP: 14.49 kW
- HAAT: 108.7 m
- Transmitter coordinates: 20°44′18.1″N 97°31′09.4″W

Links
- Website: www.soyfm.com

XHTXA-FM is a radio station on 93.9 FM in Tuxpan, Veracruz, Mexico. It is owned by Grupo FM Multimedios and known as Soy FM 93.9.

== History ==
XHTXA's concession was awarded in 1994 to María del Carmen Jiménez y Betancourt. The station was sold in 1999. The station aired a pop format known as "Calor 93" until August 2008 when XHTXA became a franchise of the Ke Buena format from Televisa Radio. On July 13, 2011, XHTXA ceases to be part of the Ke Buena chain to be called "93.9 FM". Since September 93.9 FM changes its name to "Soy FM".
