= XHPV-FM =

Radio station in Papantla, Veracruz

- Papantla, Veracruz; Mexico
- Frequency: 103.5 FM
- Branding: La Más Picuda

Programming
- Format: Grupera and norteña music

Ownership
- Owner: Grupo Radiorama; (Radio Tajín, S.A. de C.V.)
- Sister stations: XHTU-FM, XHRRR-FM, XHEJD-FM, XHCOV-FM

History
- First air date: May 11, 1977 (concession)
- Call sign meaning: Papantla, Veracruz

Technical information
- Licensing authority: CRT
- Class: B1
- ERP: 10 kW
- HAAT: 144.5 meters
- Transmitter coordinates: 20°26′52″N 97°19′03″W

Links
- Website: www.radioramapozarica.mx

XHPV-FM is a radio station on 103.5 FM in Papantla, Veracruz. It is owned by Radiorama and is known as La Más Picuda. The station's transmitter is on Cerro El Comanche.

== History ==
XEEU-AM 1170 received its concession on May 11, 1977. It broadcast as a daytimer with 250 watts. In the 1980s, it took on the XEPV-AM calls from its sister at 1270 (now XHRRR). In the 1990s, XEPV moved to 840 and increased power to 2.5 kW day and 125 watts night.

In 2010, XEPV was cleared to migrate to FM as XHPV-FM 103.5.
