= XHWA-FM =

Radio station in Xalapa, Veracruz, Mexico

- Xalapa, Veracruz; Mexico
- Frequency: 98.5 FM
- Branding: Digital

Programming
- Format: English-language adult contemporary

Ownership
- Owner: Avanradio; (Frecuencia 98, S.A. de C.V.)

History
- First air date: April 14, 1987 (concession)

Technical information
- Class: B1
- ERP: 25 kW
- Transmitter coordinates: 19°31′07.81″N 96°56′14.55″W

Links
- Webcast: Listen live
- Website: digital985.com.mx

XHWA-FM is a radio station on 98.5 FM in Xalapa, Veracruz, Mexico. It is owned by Avanradio and known as Digital with an English-language adult contemporary format.

== History ==
XHWA received its concession on April 14, 1987. It was originally owned by Gloria Alicia Iñiguez Torres but sold in the 1990s to Avanradio.

The One FM dance format this station had prior to 2019 was later exported to Veracruz on Avanradio's XHFM 94.9. It ended its run May 31, 2019, as GRD took over and flipped the station to Exa FM.

Most of GRD's stations dropped their MVS Radio franchised brands on May 1, 2021. Remaining a pop station, XHWA adopted the same "Soy FM" imaging as used by XHPR-FM in the city of Veracruz. The station then rebranded as Joya before an operator trade with Avanradio's XHTZ-FM 96.9, which saw GRD/Valanci Media Group move its programming to that frequency.
