= XHOM-FM =

Radio station in Coatzacoalcos, Veracruz

- Coatzacoalcos, Veracruz; Mexico
- Frequency: 107.5 MHz
- Branding: La Ke Buena

Programming
- Format: Regional Mexican
- Affiliations: Radiópolis

Ownership
- Owner: Liberal del sur; (Enlaces Transístmicos, S.A. de C.V.)
- Sister stations: XHNE-FM

History
- First air date: April 17, 1961 (concession)
- Call sign meaning: Derived from former AM sister XEOM

Technical information
- Licensing authority: CRT
- Class: B
- ERP: 52.195 kW
- HAAT: 45.2 m
- Transmitter coordinates: 18°8′19.4″N 94°25′48.6″W

Links
- Webcast: Listen live
- Website: lakebuenacoatza.com

XHOM-FM is a radio station on 107.5 FM in Coatzacoalcos, Veracruz. It is the local franchise of the La Ke Buena Regional Mexican format from Radiópolis.

== History ==
In 1961, Radio Coatzacoalcos, S.A., the owners of XEOM-AM 1340, became one of several dozen Mexican AM station owners to experiment with FM broadcasting. The early experiments, including XEOM-FM which received its concession on April 17, 1961, involved many stations broadcasting on even decimal frequencies; XEOM, at 88.4 MHz with an effective radiated power of 3.8 kW, is among the few left standing in any capacity. By 1969, Radio Coatzacoalcos, S.A. was owned by Francisco Ibarra López, founder of Grupo ACIR.

At the end of the 1960s, the abandonment of even decimal frequency FM stations, which were scarcely used in the Americas, meant the relocation of the remaining stations broadcasting in such a capacity. The result was that the station, now with a "correct" FM callsign of XHOM-FM and operating separately from its AM sister, was moved to 107.5 MHz and increased its power to 23.115 kW. The station has since increased power once again, to 52 kW, and it also has seen three changes in concessionaire since the 1980s while maintaining ACIR ownership.

Effective June 28, 2022, Grupo ACIR opted to shut down XHOM-FM and XHNE-FM, taking XHOM-FM off the air after 61 years. The closure of the cluster caused the loss of 17 jobs. That same week, XHDQ-FM in San Andrés Tuxtla was closed.

On November 21 of the same year, XHOM and its sister station XHNE-FM 100.1 returned to the air under the Ke Buena Regional Mexican brand. Enlaces Transístmicos became the concessionaire in 2024.
