= XHPP-FM (Fortín, Veracruz) =

Radio station in Fortín–Orizaba, Veracruz, Mexico

XEPP-AM/XHPP-FM
- Fortín de las Flores–Orizaba, Veracruz; Mexico
- Frequency: 100.3 MHz
- Branding: La Comadre

Programming
- Format: Regional Mexican

Ownership
- Owner: Valanci Media Group; (Radio Espectáculo, S.A.)

Technical information
- ERP: 10 kW

Links
- Webcast: Listen live
- Website: lacomadreorizaba.com

XHPP-FM is a radio station serving the Mountains Region of Veracruz, Mexico, from studios inside unit number 5A on the upper floor of Plaza Monte on Paseo Oriente 4 (at the corner of Sur 19) in the downtown district of Orizaba, with XHPP-FM's transmitter atop Cerro de Borrego in Barranca de San Miguel in Cuautlapan, within the municipality of Ixtaczoquitlán.

== History ==
XEPP-AM began on 1450 kHz and moved to 1190 kHz in the late 1980s. It was managed over the years by Grupo FM and Grupo ACIR, which ceded operation of the station to Grupo Radio Digital and then sold the station itself in 2016.

In 1994, this station gained a combo FM, XHPP-FM. This call sign was already in use in the state of Veracruz, on 93.5 FM in Pánuco.

The AM frequency was turned off on April 12, 2023.
