= XHEJD-FM =

Radio station in Poza Rica, Veracruz

- Poza Rica, Veracruz; Mexico
- Frequency: 100.9 FM
- Branding: Vida Romántica

Programming
- Format: Romantic

Ownership
- Owner: Radiorama; (Radio Tropicana, S.A. de C.V.)
- Sister stations: XHTU-FM XHRRR-FM (Veracruz) XHPV-FM XHCOV-FM

History
- First air date: April 10, 1958 (concession)

Technical information
- Licensing authority: CRT
- Class: B1
- ERP: 25 kW
- HAAT: 89.50 m
- Transmitter coordinates: 20°32′17″N 97°28′09″W

Links
- Webcast: Listen live
- Website: www.radioramapozarica.mx

XHEJD-FM is a radio station on 100.9 FM in Poza Rica, Veracruz. It is known as Vida Romántica and owned by Radiorama.

== History ==
XEJD-AM 1450 received its concession on April 10, 1958. It was owned by Manuel Franco Villars and sold to its current concessionaire in September 1967. Originally operating with 1,000 watts day and 250 night, it went to full 1,000-watt operation in the 1980s.

XEJD was authorized to move to FM in November 2010.
