= Sedeño River =

River in Mexico

Sedeño River is a river of eastern Mexico. It flows through the municipality of Xalapa, in the state of Veracruz.
