= XHRIC-FM =

Radio station in Poza Rica, Veracruz, Mexico

- Poza Rica, Veracruz; Mexico
- Frequency: 101.9 MHz
- Branding: Exa FM

Programming
- Format: Pop
- Affiliations: MVS Radio

Ownership
- Owner: Marcos López Zamora; (Estudio 101.9, S.A.)
- Sister stations: XHPW-FM, XHPR-FM

History
- First air date: July 2, 1993 (concession)
- Call sign meaning: Poza "Rica"

Technical information
- Licensing authority: CRT
- Class: B
- ERP: 46.3 kW
- HAAT: 154.1 m
- Transmitter coordinates: 20°32′31.4″N 97°29′36.6″W

Links
- Website: exafm.com/pozarica/

XHRIC-FM is a radio station on 101.9 FM in Poza Rica, Veracruz, Mexico. It carries the Exa FM pop format from MVS Radio. It was originally owned by one-time federal deputy Marcos López Mora, but it is now owned by Marcos López Zamora.

== History ==
XHRIC received its concession on July 2, 1993. It has carried an MVS format throughout its existence, switching from Stereorey to Exa FM in 2001.
