= XHGB-FM =

Radio station in Coatzacoalcos, Veracruz

Currently silent
- Nanchital, Veracruz; Mexico
- Broadcast area: Coatzacoalcos
- Frequency: 103.5 MHz

Ownership
- Owner: Organización Radiofónica Mexicana; (Radiodifusora XEGB-AM, S.A. de C.V.)
- Sister stations: XHAFA-FM

History
- First air date: December 8, 1951 (concession)
- Last air date: March 23, 2026

Technical information
- ERP: 25 kW
- Transmitter coordinates: 18°04′17″N 94°24′15″W

XHGB-FM is a Mexican radio station on 103.5 FM in Coatzacoalcos, Veracruz, Mexico, broadcasting from a transmitter at Nanchital.

== History ==
XEGB-AM 960 received its concession on December 8, 1951. It was owned by Luis Aranda Castillo and broadcast with 1,000 watts day and 500 night. In 1966, it was sold to Radio Coatzacoalcos, S.A., which became Radiodifusora XEGB in 1967. In 2000, the station's transmitter moved from Coatzacoalcos to Nanchital.

XEGB was cleared for AM-FM migration in 2010 as XHGB-FM 103.5.

The station flipped from "Retro" to Estéreo Joven in August 2019 as part of a change in operator at XHAFA-FM 99.3 and XHGB. The station changed formats again on November 18, 2020, when Radio S.A. (owners of XHCSV-FM 93.1) became the new operator. On April 1, 2022, Activa moved to XHAFA and became Imperio a grupera, During 3 years Organizacion Radiofonica Mexicana launched with grupera format called "La Poderosa", In June 2026 31th, La Poderosa 103.5 FM stop the air in March 23, 2026.
