= XHTZ-FM =

Radio station in Xalapa, Veracruz, Mexico

- Xalapa, Veracruz; Mexico
- Frequency: 96.9 MHz
- Branding: Joya 96.9

Programming
- Format: Adult contemporary

Ownership
- Owner: Valanci Media Group; (Radio Espectáculo, S.A.)

History
- First air date: February 7, 1974 (concession)

Technical information
- Licensing authority: CRT
- Class: B
- ERP: 30 kW
- HAAT: 49.29 m

XHTZ-FM is a radio station on 96.9 FM in Xalapa, Veracruz, Mexico. It is owned by Valanci Media Group and branded as Joya with an adult contemporary format.

== History ==
XHTZ received its concession on February 7, 1974.

Previous logo

In October 2024, XHTZ-FM and XHWA-FM 98.5 exchanged formats and operators, with Valanci Media Group's Joya format moving to the 96.9 frequency. Avanradio then was approved in March 2025 to transfer its concession to Radio Espectáculo, S.A., a Valanci Media Group subsidiary.
