= XHKM-FM =

Radio station in Minatitlán, Veracruz, Mexico

- Minatitlán, Veracruz; Mexico
- Frequency: 95.3 FM
- Branding: La Expresión!

Programming
- Format: Pop

Ownership
- Owner: Núcleo Radio Mina; (Radio Mina, S.A.)

History
- First air date: July 16, 1964 (concession)

Technical information
- Licensing authority: CRT
- Class: B1
- ERP: 25 kW
- HAAT: 96.30 m
- Transmitter coordinates: 17°59′11″N 94°32′36″W

Links
- Webcast: Listen live
- Website: gruporadiomina.com

XHKM-FM is a radio station on 95.3 FM in Minatitlán, Veracruz, Mexico. It is owned by Núcleo Radio Mina and is known as La Expresión! with a pop format.

== History ==
XEKM-AM 1450 received its concession on July 16, 1964. It was owned by Daniel Schacht Pérez and broadcast with 250 watts, later upgraded to 1,000. Control promptly passed to Radio Mina, S.A.

XEKM was cleared for AM-FM migration in 2010 as XHKM-FM 95.3.
