= XHTVR-FM =

Radio station in Tuxpan, Veracruz

XHTVR-FM / XETVR-AM
- Tuxpan, Veracruz; Mexico
- Frequency: 99.5 FM / 1150 AM
- Branding: Vida Azul

Programming
- Format: Spanish adult contemporary

Ownership
- Owner: Grupo Radiorama; (Radio Tuxpan, S.A. de C.V.)
- Sister stations: XHCRA-FM, XHBY-FM

History
- First air date: August 28, 1991; 1994 (FM)
- Former frequencies: 106.9 MHz (FM, 1994–2020)
- Call sign meaning: "Tuxpan, Veracruz"

Technical information
- Licensing authority: CRT
- Class: B1 (FM); B (AM)
- Power: 1.5 kW day/.5 kW night
- ERP: 10 kW
- HAAT: 2.50 m
- Transmitter coordinates: 20.953840°N 97.406718°W

Links
- Webcast: Listen live
- Website: vidaazulenlinea.com

XHTVR-FM 99.5/XETVR-AM 1150 is a combo radio station in Tuxpan, Veracruz. It is known as Vida Azul and carries a Spanish adult contemporary format.

== History ==
XETVR received its concession in 1991. It was authorized to become an AM-FM combo in 1994 on 106.9 MHz.

On February 12, 2020, XHTVR began its move from 106.9 to 99.5 MHz. The move was ordered by the Federal Telecommunications Institute in 2018, as a condition of the renewal of XHTVR's concession, to clear the 106–108 MHz band for community and indigenous stations.
