= XHPP-FM (Pánuco, Veracruz) =

Radio station in Pánuco, Veracruz, serving Tampico, Tamaulipas

- Pánuco, Veracruz; Mexico
- Broadcast area: Tampico, Tamaulipas
- Frequency: 93.5 FM
- RDS: @ARROBA #TECONECTA
- Branding: @FM (Arroba FM)

Programming
- Format: Pop

Ownership
- Owner: Radiorama; (XHPP-FM, S.A. de C.V.)
- Sister stations: XHEOLA-FM, XHETU-FM, XHPAV-FM

History
- First air date: May 31, 1990 (concession)

Technical information
- Licensing authority: CRT
- Class: B1
- ERP: 20.39 kW
- HAAT: 83 m (272 ft)
- Transmitter coordinates: 22°13′13.62″N 97°49′50.63″W

Links
- Webcast: Listen live
- Website: arroba.fm/tampico

XHPP-FM is an FM radio station in Pánuco, Veracruz. It broadcasts from a transmitter located in Pueblo Viejo and carries Radiorama's @FM pop format.

== History ==
XHPP received its concession on May 31, 1990. It was owned by Promociones Radiofónicas Culturales, S.A., which was controlled by Alfonso Sanabria Mallén, an employee of Radiorama. In 2003, control passed to the current concessionaire.

Between 2015 and 2018, XHPP-FM broadcast from a transmitter in Tampico, Tamaulipas.
