= 101.7 FM =

FM radio frequency

The following radio stations broadcast on FM frequency 101.7 MHz:

== Argentina ==
- Del Sol in Roldán, Santa Fe
- Radio María in Deán Funes, Córdoba
- Vanguardia in Puerto Gaboto, Santa Fe
- LRM436 Vida in Las Toscas, Santa Fe

== Austria ==
- FM4 in Schöckl, Styria

== Australia ==
- Gold 101.7 in Sydney, New South Wales
- 2APH in Albury, New South Wales
- 7HOFM in Hobart, Tasmania
- ABC Classic in Mount Isa, Queensland
- 3MGB in Mallacoota, Victoria
- Radio National in Warrnambool, Victoria
- Sea FM in Burnie, Tasmania

== Brazil ==
- Jangadeiro BandNews FM (ZYC 412) in Fortaleza, Ceará

== Canada (Channel 269) ==
- CBGF-FM in Fox Harbour, Newfoundland and Labrador
- CBON-FM-5 in Elliot Lake, Ontario
- CBQ-FM in Thunder Bay, Ontario
- CBUE-FM in Hope, British Columbia
- CBXE-FM in Golden, British Columbia
- CFAE-FM in La Grande-1, Quebec
- CFJO-FM-1 in Lac-Megantic, Quebec
- CHLY-FM in Nanaimo, British Columbia
- CHRG-FM in Maria Reserve, Quebec
- CIAM-FM-5 in Weberville, Alberta
- CIDG-FM in Ottawa, Ontario
- CIVL-FM in Abbotsford, British Columbia
- CJME-1-FM in Swift Current, Saskatchewan
- CJSO-FM in Sorel, Quebec
- CKDH-FM in Amherst, Nova Scotia
- CKER-FM in Edmonton, Alberta
- CKHQ-FM in Oka, Quebec
- CIDG-FM in Ottawa, Ontario
- CKJC-FM in Sudbury, Ontario
- CKNX-FM in Wingham, Ontario
- VF2382 in Long Plain, Manitoba

== China ==
- CNR The Voice of China in Zunyi
- SMG Pop Music Radio in Shanghai
- Panyu Radio in Panyu, Guangzhou

== Germany ==
- Lagardère Media in Germany (Radio Salu, Antenne AC, Das Hit Radio)

== Indonesia ==
- Radio Swaragama in Yogyakarta

== Mexico ==
- XEX-FM in Mexico City
- XHAR-FM in Pueblo Viejo, Veracruz
- XHCPN-FM in Piedras Negras, Coahuila
- XHCUT-FM in Cuautla, Morelos
- XHEMM-FM in Morelia, Michoacán
- XHESA-FM in Culiacán, Sinaloa
- XHHPR-FM in Hidalgo del Parral, Chihuahua
- XHHX-FM in Ciudad Obregón, Sonora
- XHOG-FM in Ojinaga, Chihuahua
- XHPARC-FM in Armería, Colima
- XHPR-FM in Veracruz, Veracruz
- XHROOC-FM in Chetumal, Quintana Roo
- XHTD-FM in Coatzacoalcos, Veracruz
- XHUNO-FM in Aguascalientes, Aguascalientes
- XHV-FM in Chihuahua, Chihuahua
- XHVIR-FM in Ciudad Victoria, Tamaulipas
- XHVV-FM in Tuxtla Gutiérrez, Chiapas
- XHZB-FM in Oaxaca, Oaxaca

== New Zealand ==
- RNZ National in Blenheim, Christchurch, Wellington, and Whakatane.

== Philippines ==
- DWST in San Fernando, La Union

== United Kingdom ==
- Heart East in Harlow
- Classic FM (UK) in Glasgow, Scotland (can also be received in Edinburgh)

== United States (Channel 269) ==
- KABT in Hawley, Texas
- KALY-LP in Minneapolis, Minnesota
- KAYD in Silsbee, Texas
- KAYL in Storm Lake, Iowa
- KBFZ-LP in Garden City, Kansas
- KBKB in Fort Madison, Iowa
- KBYB in Hope, Arkansas
- KCDU in Carmel, California
- KCTT-FM in Yellville, Arkansas
- KDNO in Thermopolis, Wyoming
- KEGE in Hamilton City, California
- KEKO (FM) in Hebronville, Texas
- KGOZ in Gallatin, Missouri
- KHFG-LP in Helena, Montana
- KHGQ in Shungnak, Alaska
- KHST in Lamar, Missouri
- KHTH in Santa Rosa, California
- KIHB-LP in Wichita, Kansas
- KJDM in Lindsborg, Kansas
- KJNI-LP in Lake Elsinore, California
- KJTR-LP in Rolla, Missouri
- KKIQ in Livermore, California
- KKYZ in Huachuca City, Arizona
- KKZU in Sayre, Oklahoma
- KLDJ in Duluth, Minnesota
- KLRR in Redmond, Oregon
- KLTD in Temple, Texas
- KMWM in Alturas, California
- KMXM in Helena Valley Northeast, Montana
- KNTE in Bay City, Texas
- KPEN in Soldotna, Alaska
- KPUL in Winterset, Iowa
- KQAZ in Springerville, Arizona
- KQDZ in Elsberry, Missouri
- KQEU-LP in Houston, Texas
- KQTM in Rio Rancho, New Mexico
- KRCH in Rochester, Minnesota
- KREJ in Medicine Lodge, Kansas
- KSAM-FM in Huntsville, Texas
- KSBL in Carpinteria, California
- KSKE-FM in Eagle, Colorado
- KSLK in Selawik, Alaska
- KSTK in Wrangell, Alaska
- KTFX-FM in Warner, Oklahoma
- KTNY in Libby, Montana
- KTUY in Togiak, Alaska
- KUBY-LP in Dillingham, Alaska
- KVLO in Humnoke, Arkansas
- KVOE-FM in Emporia, Kansas
- KVOM-FM in Morrilton, Arkansas
- KXBB in Cienega Springs, Arizona
- KXCL in Rock Creek Park, Colorado
- KXKR in Catalina Foothills, Arizona
- KXSB in Big Bear Lake, California
- KXUT-LP in Logan, Utah
- KYDA in Azle, Texas
- KZEW in Wheatland, Wyoming
- KZXR-FM in Prosser, Washington
- KZZM in Mason, Texas
- WAVF in Hanahan, South Carolina
- WAWX in Lynchburg, Virginia
- WBEA in Southold, New York
- WBRK in Pittsfield, Massachusetts
- WBWL in Lynn, Massachusetts
- WCVT in Stowe, Vermont
- WCZR in Vero Beach, Florida
- WDEL-FM in Canton, New Jersey
- WDFC-LP in Greensboro, North Carolina
- WDVH-FM in Trenton, Florida
- WEHS-LP in Eupora, Mississippi
- WELD in Moorefield, West Virginia
- WGEL in Greenville, Illinois
- WGKV in Pulaski, New York
- WGND-LP in Lafollette, Tennessee
- WGOG in Walhalla, South Carolina
- WHMH in Sauk Rapids, Minnesota
- WHOF in North Canton, Ohio
- WHZZ in Lansing, Michigan
- WIKL in Elwood, Indiana
- WIOM-LP in Springfield, Massachusetts
- WIVR in Kentland, Indiana
- WJLE-FM in Smithville, Tennessee
- WJSQ in Athens, Tennessee
- WKOM in Columbia, Tennessee
- WKWI in Kilmarnock, Virginia
- WKYM in Monticello, Kentucky
- WKYZ in Key Colony Beach, Florida
- WLDE in Fort Wayne, Indiana
- WLLW in Geneva, New York
- WLOF in Attica, New York
- WLQM in Franklin, Virginia
- WLTB in Johnson City, New York
- WMGL in Ravenel, South Carolina
- WMRH-LP in Linwood, New Jersey
- WMRR in Muskegon Heights, Michigan
- WMVL in Linesville, Pennsylvania
- WMXN in Stevenson, Alabama
- WNKO in Newark, Ohio
- WNYQ in Hudson Falls, New York
- WORM in Savannah, Tennessee
- WOWQ in Central City, Pennsylvania
- WPRJ in Coleman, Michigan
- WQRR in Reform, Alabama
- WQVE in Albany, Georgia
- WRAD-FM in Radford, Virginia
- WRBV in Warner Robins, Georgia
- WRCV in Dixon, Illinois
- WRFH-LP in Hillsdale, Michigan
- WRJF-LP in Menomonie, Wisconsin
- WSOV-LP in Millheim, Pennsylvania
- WSVV in Searsport, Maine
- WTHO in Thomson, Georgia
- WTID in Graceville, Florida
- WTPR in Mckinnon, Tennessee
- WTYE in Robinson, Illinois
- WVKY in Shelbyville, Kentucky
- WWJP-LP in Rice Lake, Wisconsin
- WXTH-LP in Richwood, West Virginia
- WXZY-LP in Kane, Pennsylvania
- WYAP-LP in Clay, West Virginia
- WYOY in Gluckstadt, Mississippi
- WYUM in Mount Vernon, Georgia
- WZEB in Ocean View, Delaware
- WZYQ in Mound Bayou, Mississippi
