= Micmacs of Gesgapegiag =

- Aboriginal Reserve
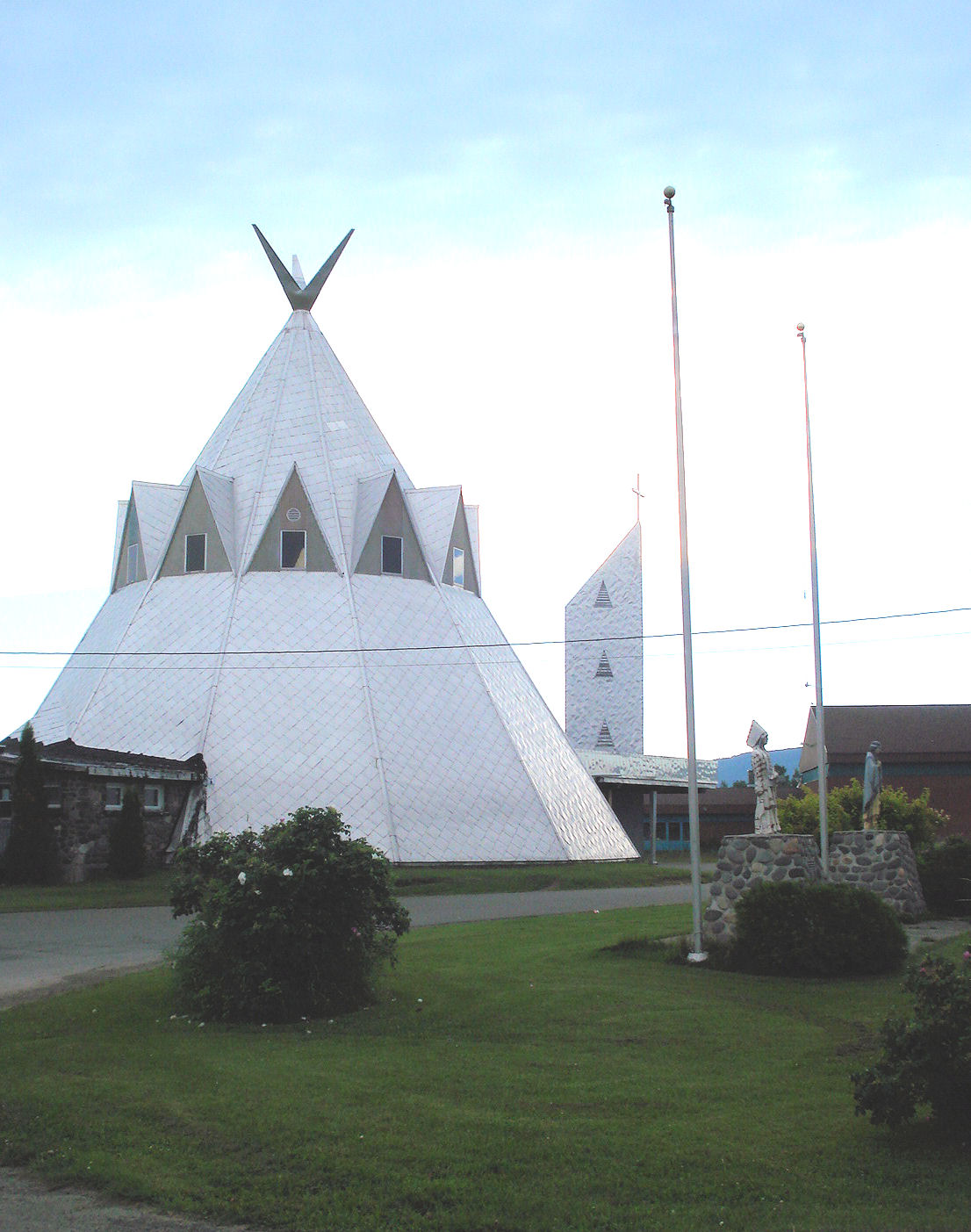
- Traditional tipee-shaped church

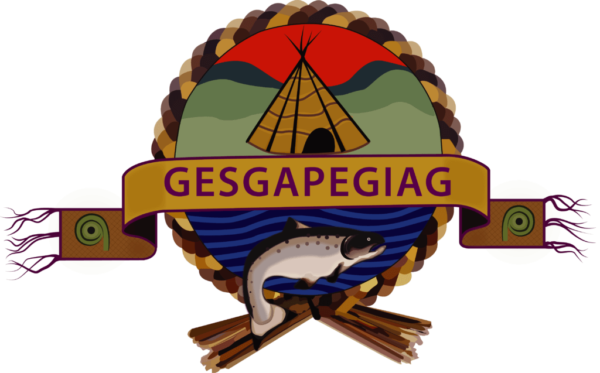

- Location of Gesgapegiag in Quebec
- Coordinates: 48.199464°N 65.920566°W
- Country: Canada
- Province: Quebec
- County: Gaspésie– Îles-de-la-Madeleine
- Founded: 1850s

Government
  - Chief: Roderick Larocque
  - Councillors: 8

Population (2021)
  - Total: 637
- Time zone: UTC-5 (EST)
- Postal code: G0C
- Area code: 418
- Highway: R-132
- Waterways: Cascapédia River
- Website: gesgapegiag.ca

Micmacs of Gesgapegiag are a Mi'gmaq First Nation in Quebec, Canada. Located on the south shore of the Gaspé Peninsula at the mouth of the Cascapédia River, where it widens into Chaleur Bay. Gesgapegiag is one of three Mi'kmaq reservations located in the Gaspe Peninsula. Traditionally its the seventh district of Mi’gma’gi known as Gespe’gewa’gi, the ancestral and unceded territory of the Mi’gmaq.

In 2000, the three Mi’kmaw communities joined forces to form a political and administrative organization, the Mi'gmawei Mawiomi Secretariat, so as to offer shared services and forge ties with non-Indigenous partners, particularly in the fishing and forestry sectors.

== History ==
The Mi’kmaq are among the most ancient Indigenous peoples of eastern North America, with archaeological evidence indicating that their ancestors have lived in the Atlantic region for more than 10,000 years. Their traditional territory, known as Mi’kma’ki, encompassed present-day Nova Scotia, Prince Edward Island, New Brunswick, parts of Newfoundland, and the Gaspé Peninsula of Quebec. The region’s rivers, forests, and coastal waters provided the Mi’kmaq with an abundance of resources that supported their way of life.

As a semi-nomadic people, the Mi’kmaq lived in harmony with the changing seasons. Summers were spent along the coasts, where fishing particularly for Atlantic salmon and cod was essential by utilizing their distinctive birch bark canoes that were capable of crossing open water. During the winter months, smaller family groups moved inland to hunt moose, caribou, and other game. Their profound understanding of the land and environment enabled them to adapt to the challenges of their rugged homeland with resilience, skill, and sustainability.

The reserve itself was legally established in the 1850s under colonial administration. At the time it was known as Indians of Maria and it was only until 1988 when the Department of Indian Affairs granted the reserve to be called its former name of Gesgapegiag. The original form of the name Cascapédia, meaning "where the river widens", in which the reserve is located next to.

== Demographics ==
As of September 2025, the band had a total of registered population of 1705 members, 721 lived on reserve and 984 lived off reserve.

== Language ==
Mi'gmaq speak Mi'gmaq, an Eastern Algonquian language. According to Statistics Canada's 2011 census, 63.8% of the population speak an Aboriginal language. 32.6% has an Aboriginal language as the first language learned and 46.8% speak an Aboriginal language at home. 45.4% of the population speak English and French and 53.9% speak only English.

== Governance ==
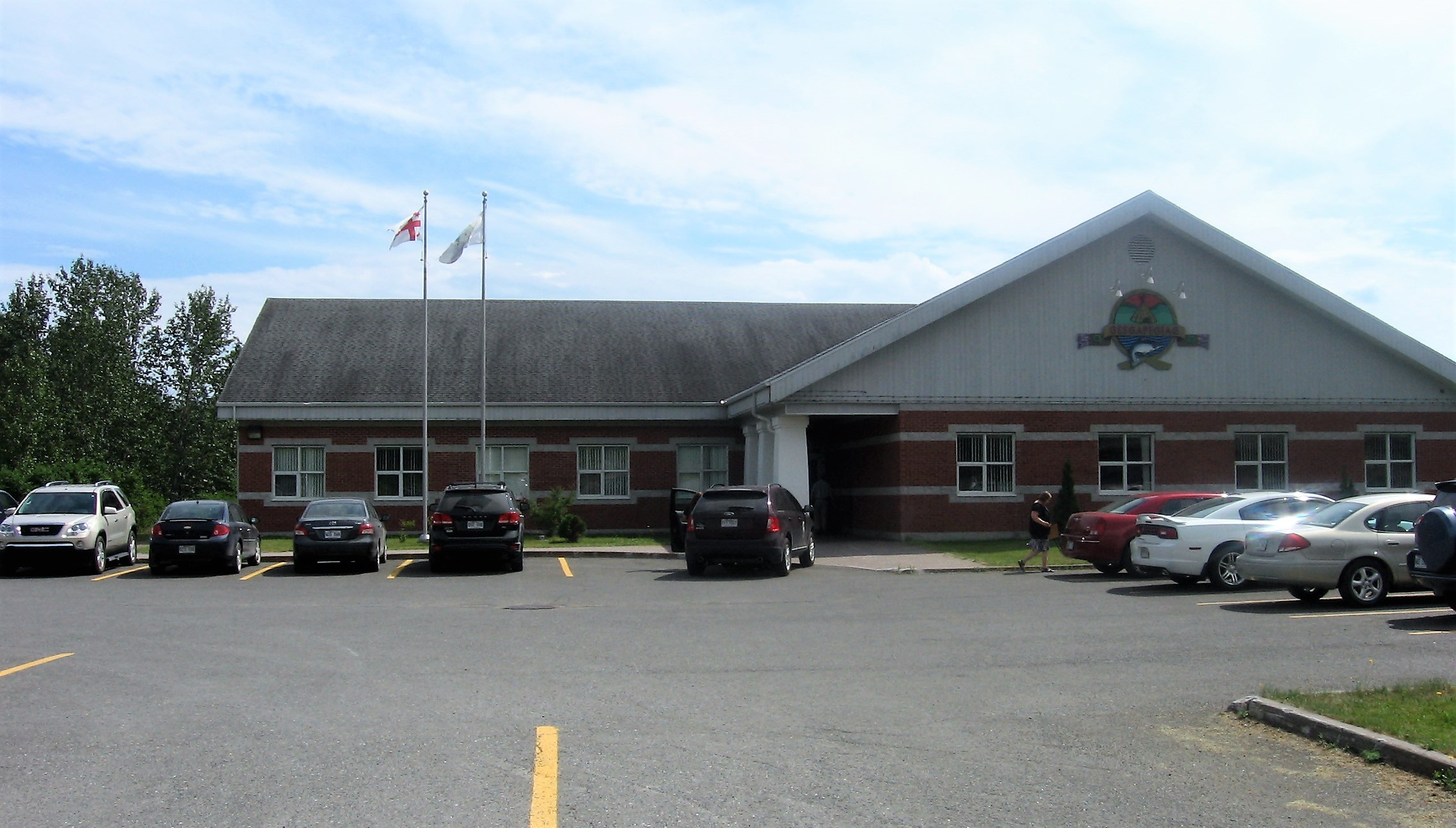
Band office

Micmacs of Gesgapegiag are governed by a band council elected according to the First Nations Elections Act. For the 2023-2027 tenure, this council is composed of the chief, Roderick Larocque, and eight councillors.

== See also ==
- Gesgapegiag
- Mi'gmaq
