= Kespek =

Kespek may refer to:

- the Mi'kmaq territory of Kespek, called Gespe'gewa'gi locally, (Mi'kmaq: gespe'g, "Last Land"), which is located at the Gaspé Peninsula and western New Brunswick
- the Gaspé Peninsula, or Gespe'g in Mi'kmaq, or Gaspésie in French
- the First Nations (Mi'kmaq) reserve of Gesgapegiag, which is located at the southern shore of the Gaspé Peninsula
- the town of Gaspé, which is located at the northeastern tip of the peninsula
