= WDFC =

WDFC may refer to:

- WDFC-LP, a radio station in North Carolina
- Western Dedicated Freight Corridor
- WD-40 Company NASDAQ stock ticker
