= KSKE =

KSKE may refer to:

- KSKE-FM, a radio station (101.7 FM) licensed to Eagle, Colorado, United States
- KVBV, a radio station (1450 AM) licensed to Buena Vista, Colorado, which held the call sign KSKE from 2004 to 2020
- KKVM, a radio station (104.7 FM) licensed to Vail, Colorado, which held the call sign KSKE-FM from January 1990 to September 2009
