= Carl Story =

- Born: May 29, 1916; Lenoir, North Carolina, U.S.
- Died: March 31, 1995 (aged 78) Greenville, South Carolina, U.S.
- Genres: Bluegrass
- Instrument(s): Fiddle, guitar, banjo

Carl Story (May 29, 1916 – March 31, 1995) was an American bluegrass musician, and leader of his band the Rambling Mountaineers. He was dubbed "The Father of Bluegrass Gospel Music" by the governor of Oklahoma.

== Biography ==
Story was born in Lenoir, North Carolina, United States, into a musically inclined family. His father played the fiddle and his mother played the guitar and Story learned to master both fiddle, guitar and clawhammer banjo. In the early 1930s, after winning a fiddle contest, he joined J. E. Clark and the Lonesome Mountaineers performing at WLVA in Lynchburg, Virginia. In 1934, he formed the Rambling Mountaineers together with banjo player Johnny Whisnant and guitarists Dudley Watson and Ed McMahan. Within a year they played over radio station WHKY in Hickory, North Carolina. It later led to performances at WSPA in Spartanburg, South Carolina and WWNC in Asheville, North Carolina. They recorded for ARC in 1939 and Okeh Records in 1940; however, these recordings were never issued. Story played with Bill Monroe in 1942 as a fiddler - replacing Howdy Forrester who had been drafted - but eventually Story was also drafted in October 1943.

After his discharge from the U.S. Navy in 1945, he began reforming and performing with his Rambling Mountaineers on the Mid-Day Merry-Go-Round show at WNOX in Knoxville, Tennessee. In 1947, he recorded for the Mercury label. At the recording sessions of 1947, Story temporarily labelled his band the Melody Four Quartet. During the 1950s, Carl Story's Rambling Mountaineers performed on the Farm and Fun Time Show at WCYB in Bristol, Virginia and on the Cas Walker Show over WBIR-TV in Knoxville, Tennessee. His Mountaineers also appeared on radio stations WAYS in Charlotte, North Carolina, WEAS in Decatur, Georgia, and WLOS in Asheville, North Carolina. He had a new recording contract on Columbia Records in 1953. Two years later he was back to Mercury Records. In 1957, he switched label to Starday Records, where he stayed for eighteen years. In 1960, Story began working as a deejay for WFLW in Monticello, Kentucky. Beginning in the 1960s, and for the next 20 years, Story toured extensively throughout the US and Europe. He signed another recording contract with CMH Records in the mid-1970s. He settled down in Greer, South Carolina, working as a deejay over WCKI in Greer.

== Death ==
Story died on March 31, 1995, aged 78.

== Bibliography ==
- Vladimir Bogdanov, Chris Woodstra, Stephen Thomas Erlewine, All Music Guide to Country: The Definitive Guide to Country Music, 2003, ISBN 978-0879307608
- W. K. McNeil, Encyclopedia of American Gospel Music, 2005, ISBN 978-0415941792
- Kurt Wolff, Orla Duane, Country Music: The Rough Guide, 2000, ISBN 978-1858285344
