= Cascapédia =

Cascapédia may refer to:

- Cascapédia River, a river in the Gaspé Peninsula of Quebec, Canada
- Cascapédia–Saint-Jules, a municipality in Quebec, Canada
- Lake Cascapedia, a lake in Quebec, Canada
- Cascapédia Bay, an arm of the Gulf of Saint Lawrence located between Quebec and New Brunswick
- Cascapedia, a U.S. National Champion racemare
