= KBKB =

KBKB may refer to:

- KBKB (AM), a radio station (1360 AM) licensed to Fort Madison, Iowa, United States
- KBKB-FM, a radio station (101.7 FM) licensed to Fort Madison, Iowa, United States
