= Keko =

Keko or KEKO may refer to:

== People ==
- Keko (footballer, born 1973), Spanish footballer
- Keko (footballer, born 1991), Spanish footballer
- Keko (footballer, born 1996)
- Keko (Guyanese rapper) (born 1974), Guyanese rapper

== Other uses ==
- Keko (administrative ward), in Tanzania
- KEKO (FM), a radio station of Texas, United States
- Elko Regional Airport (ICAO code:KEKO), an airport in Nevada, United States
