= WFLW =

Radio station in Kentucky, US

- Monticello, Kentucky; United States
- Frequency: 1360 kHz
- Branding: Real Country 95.7 FM / 1360 AM WFLW

Programming
- Format: Classic Country
- Affiliations: KY News Network

Ownership
- Owner: Stephen W. Staples, Jr.
- Sister stations: WKYM

History
- Former frequencies: 1570 kHz (1955–1956)

Technical information
- Licensing authority: FCC
- Facility ID: 63324
- Class: D
- Power: 1,000 watts day 20 watts night
- Translators: W239CP (95.7 MHz, Monticello)

Links
- Public license information: Public file; LMS
- Webcast: Listen Live
- Website: https://www.facebook.com/WFLW957FM/

WFLW (1360 AM) is a radio station broadcasting a Classic Country format licensed to Monticello, Kentucky, United States. The station is currently owned by Stephen W. Staples Jr.

== History ==
The station began broadcasting in 1955 at a frequency of 1570 kilohertz under ownership of Wolf Creek Broadcasting. The following year, it was purchased by Fred Staples, with program director duties assumed by his son, Stephen. The station moved to its current frequency after the sale.

The station launched its FM companion, WFLW-FM (now WKYM), in 1965; it started as a beautiful music station before switching to an adult contemporary format nine years later.

In the mid-2010s, WFLW launched a low-power translator, W239CP, to bring the station's AM offerings to the local FM dial.

== Notable on-air personalities ==
- Hal Rogers once served as the station's staff announcer before pursuing his political career.
