= XHZB-FM =

Radio station in Oaxaca, Oaxaca, Mexico

- Oaxaca, Oaxaca; Mexico
- Frequency: 101.7 MHz
- Branding: La Mejor

Programming
- Format: Grupera
- Affiliations: MVS Radio

Ownership
- Owner: Organización Radiofónica de Oaxaca; (Radiodifusora XHZB, S.A. de C.V.)

History
- First air date: July 15, 1971 (concession)

Technical information
- ERP: 25 kW
- Transmitter coordinates: 17°04′12.97″N 96°43′50.77″W

Links
- Webcast: ororadio.com.mx/radio
- Website: lamejor.com.mx/oaxaca

XHZB-FM is a radio station on 101.7 FM in Oaxaca, Oaxaca, Mexico. XHZB carries the La Mejor grupera format from MVS Radio.

== History ==
XHZB began as XEZB-AM 1120, owned by Manuel Zarate Aquino. It received its concession on July 15, 1971, and broadcast on 1120 kHz as a daytimer. Ownership passed to Alberto Miguel Márquez Rodríguez, director of ORO, in 1986.
