= XHOG-FM =

Radio station in Ojinaga, Chihuahua

- Ojinana, Chihuahua; Mexico
- Frequency: 101.7 FM
- Branding: La Primera

Programming
- Format: Regional Mexican

Ownership
- Owner: Grupo BM Radio; (Israel Beltrán Montes)

History
- First air date: January 6, 1959 (concession)
- Call sign meaning: OjinaGa

Technical information
- Licensing authority: CRT
- Class: B1
- ERP: 25 kW
- HAAT: 37.76 m (123.9 ft)
- Transmitter coordinates: 29°32′26″N 104°23′44″W

Links
- Webcast: Listen live
- Website: gbmradio.com

XHOG-FM is a radio station on 101.7 FM in Ojinaga, Chihuahua, Mexico. The station is owned by Grupo BM Radio and carries a Regional Mexican format known as La Primera.

== History ==
XHOG began on AM as XEOG-AM 1260, awarded on January 6, 1959 to Ernesto R. Chapa Terrazas. In the 1960s, ownership passed to Sistema Radio Ranchito, S.A.

It migrated to FM in 2011.
