= CHRG-FM =

First Nations community radio station in Gesgapegiag, Quebec

Coordinates: 48°11′56″N 65°55′18″W

- Gesgapegiag (Maria Reserve), Quebec; Canada
- Frequency: 101.7 MHz

Programming
- Format: First Nations community radio

Ownership
- Owner: Douglas Martin

History
- First air date: March 1, 1991

Technical information
- ERP: 10 watts
- HAAT: 10 metres

CHRG-FM is a First Nations community radio station that broadcasts at 101.7 FM in Gesgapegiag, Quebec, Canada.

The station is owned by Douglas Martin.

== History ==
On June 22, 1987, Douglas Martin received an approval by the CRTC to operate a new Micmac, English and French-language FM radio station at Maria (Reserve) on the frequency 93.1 MHz with an effective radiated power of 1 watt. The station signed on in the late 1980s.

On January 17, 1991, the CRTC approved Douglas Martin's application to change CHRG-FM's frequency from 93.1 MHz to 101.7 MHz.

On September 20, 2022, Douglas Martin submitted an application to operate a low-power Indigenous (Type B Native) FM radio station in Gesgapegiag on the frequency of 101.7 MHz (channel 269LP) with an effective radiated power of 50 watts (omnidirectional antenna with an effective height of the antenna above average terrain (EHAAT) of -14.2 metres). This application was approved on May 4, 2023.
