= XHHX-FM =

Radio station in Ciudad Obregón, Sonora

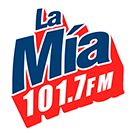
- Ciudad Obregón, Sonora; Mexico
- Frequency: 101.7 FM
- Branding: La Mía

Programming
- Format: Regional Mexican

Ownership
- Owner: Radio Grupo García de León; (XEHX, S.A. de C.V.)

History
- First air date: June 4, 1952 (concession)

Technical information
- Licensing authority: CRT
- Class: B1
- ERP: 15 kW
- HAAT: 51.5 m (169 ft)
- Transmitter coordinates: 27°29′32″N 109°56′05″W

Links
- Website: www.lamiaobregon.com

XHHX-FM is a radio station broadcasting on 101.7 FM in Ciudad Obregón, Sonora. Owned by Radio Grupo García de León, it operates under the name La Mía and carries a Regional Mexican format.

== History ==
XEHX-AM was granted its concession on June 4, 1952. Initially owned by Gerardo Millán Ríos, the station was transferred to María Elena Coral Otero de Chávez in the 1960s following her divorce from Millán Ríos. It operated as a daytimer with 1,000 watts, first broadcasting on 1370 kHz before being moved to 1460 kHz. In 1971, it was sold to Radio Yaquí, then to Sistemas Publicitarios y de Mercadotecnia de Obregón in 1992, and finally to XEHX, S.A. in 1994. In 2006, XEHX was relocated from 1460 kHz to 860 kHz, maintaining its 1,000-watt power output.

In October 2011, XEHX received approval to migrate to FM, rebranding as XHHX-FM on 101.7.
