= XHPARC-FM =

Radio station in Armería–Tecomán, Colima

- Armería, Colima; Mexico
- Broadcast area: Tecomán, Colima
- Frequency: 101.7 FM
- Branding: Limón FM

Programming
- Format: Regional Mexican

Ownership
- Owner: Grupo Radiofónico ZER; (Radiodifusora XHZER, S.A. de C.V.)

History
- First air date: February 2020
- Call sign meaning: Armería, Colima

Technical information
- Class: A
- ERP: 3 kW
- HAAT: 28.1 meters
- Transmitter coordinates: 18°56′15″N 103°57′36″W

Links
- Webcast: grupozer.mx/portada.php?id=302

XHPARC-FM is a radio station on 101.7 FM in Armería, Colima, licensed to Tecomán. It is owned by Grupo Radiofónico Zer and known as Limón FM with a Regional Mexican format.

== History ==
XHPARC was awarded in the IFT-4 radio auction of 2017 on an uncontested bid and began broadcasting in February 2020.
