= KGRS =

Radio station in Burlington, Iowa

- Burlington, Iowa; United States
- Frequency: 107.3 MHz
- Branding: Mix 107.3

Programming
- Format: Hot adult contemporary
- Affiliations: Premiere Networks; Westwood One

Ownership
- Owner: Titan Broadcasting, LLC (sale to Civic Media pending)
- Sister stations: KBKB-FM

History
- First air date: November 27, 1968
- Former call signs: KBUR-FM (1968–1975)
- Call sign meaning: "Great Radio Station"

Technical information
- Licensing authority: FCC
- Facility ID: 39267
- Class: C1
- ERP: 100,000 watts
- HAAT: 131 m (430 ft)
- Transmitter coordinates: 40°49′26″N 91°08′33″W

Links
- Public license information: Public file; LMS
- Website: www.thenewmix.com

KGRS (107.3 FM) is a commercial radio station in Burlington, Iowa, United States. The station broadcasts a hot adult contemporary format. KGRS is owned by Titan Broadcasting, LLC, which is owned by John C. "LJ" Pritchard. The station's transmitter and broadcast tower are located in Burlington near the intersection of U.S. Route 61 and U.S. Route 34.

Titan Broadcasting LLC agreed to purchase the station from GAP West (owned by Skip Weller) in late 2007. The station was owned by Clear Channel prior to GAP West.

In October 2026, it was announced that Titan Broadcasting, along with two other radio broadcasting companies would sell their radio stations to Civic Media.
