= KKYZ =

Radio station in Sierra Vista, Arizona

- Huachuca City, Arizona; United States
- Broadcast area: Sierra Vista, Arizona
- Frequency: 101.7 MHz

Programming
- Format: Oldies

Ownership
- Owner: Cochise Broadcasting (a Wyoming LLC)
- Sister stations: KCDQ

History
- Founded: October 17, 1990; 35 years ago
- Former call signs: KXHC (1990–1990)

Technical information
- Licensing authority: FCC
- Facility ID: 171023
- Class: A
- ERP: 6,000 watts
- HAAT: -50 meters (-163 ft)
- Transmitter coordinates: 31°38′15″N 110°20′9″W
- Translators: 94.5 K233DG (Sierra Vista); 99.1 K256CJ (Sierra Vista)

Links
- Public license information: Public file; LMS
- Website: kkyz.com

KKYZ (101.7 FM) is a radio station broadcasting an Oldies format. Licensed to Huachuca City, Arizona, the station serves the Sierra Vista area. It is owned by Cochise Broadcasting, a Wyoming LLC.

KKYZ is a Class A FM station, with an effective radiated power (ERP) of 6,000 watts.

== History ==
The station went on the air as KXHC on October 17, 1990. On December 21, 1990, the station changed its call sign to KKYZ.

In 2010, Cochise Broadcasting obtained a second construction permit for a station on 101.7 MHz in Huachuca City, with call sign KXKR. In December 2011, that station was activated at 100 watts, a temporary facility, as the company was in the middle of a lengthy process to move KKYZ into the Tucson radio market. It would be licensed to Catalina Foothills at 101.1 MHz. An application for such a move was approved in 2020. In 2021, the KKYZ call letters were transferred to the Huachuca City facility, operating on the same facility as the first KKYZ, and the station moving to Tucson changed call letters from KKYZ to KXKR and went silent.
