= WORM-FM =

- Savannah, Tennessee; United States
- Frequency: 101.7 MHz
- Branding: 101 The Worm

Programming
- Format: Country

Ownership
- Owner: Hunt Communications, LLC
- Sister stations: WORM-AM

Technical information
- Licensing authority: FCC
- Facility ID: 24101
- Class: A
- ERP: 4,300 watts
- HAAT: 61 meters (200 feet)
- Transmitter coordinates: 35°14′24″N 88°14′29″W

Links
- Public license information: Public file; LMS

WORM-FM (101.7 FM, "101 The Worm") is a radio station licensed to serve Savannah, Tennessee, United States. The station is owned by Hunt Communications, LLC. It airs a country music format.

The station was assigned the WORM-FM call letters by the Federal Communications Commission on March 29, 1979.
