= KMWM =

- Alturas, California; United States
- Frequency: 101.7 MHz

Programming
- Format: Country

Ownership
- Owner: Woodrow Matthew Warren

History
- First air date: August 11, 2016
- Former call signs: KQGD (2016, CP)

Technical information
- Licensing authority: FCC
- Facility ID: 191562
- Class: A
- ERP: 500 watts
- HAAT: 121 meters (397 ft)
- Transmitter coordinates: 41°29′57.39″N 120°37′18.15″W

Links
- Public license information: Public file; LMS

KMWM (101.7 FM) is a radio station licensed to Alturas, California, United States, and is owned by Woodrow Matthew Warren.

== History ==
On August 14, 2013, the FCC granted a construction permit to L Topaz Enterprises, Inc for 101.7 MHz with an effective radiated power of 51 kW. The location of the transmitter was chosen with the attempt to cover the city of Alturas, California, and have a listenable signal in Lakeview, Oregon.

On May 22, 2014, L. Topaz sold the construction permit to Woodward Matthew Warren of Lakeview, Oregon, for $25,000, $15,000 of which was in the form of a promissory note. Unable to raise the funds to build the high power station Warren applied for a construction permit on July 26, 2016, to build a 500 watt station colocated with his existing KALT-FM in Alturas. Warren filed for the license August 11, 2016, three days before the construction permit was due to expire. Warren also owns KLCR in Lakeview, Oregon.

KMWM went on the air on August 11, 2016, changing to the call sign on July 7, 2016, from KOGD prior to commencing operation.
