= KJTR-LP =

- Rolla, Missouri; United States
- Frequency: 101.7 MHz

Programming
- Format: religious

Ownership
- Owner: Rolla Chinese Christian Association

Technical information
- Licensing authority: FCC
- Facility ID: 132400
- Class: L1
- ERP: 100 watts
- HAAT: −92.1 meters (−302 ft)
- Transmitter coordinates: 37°57′19″N 91°45′3″W

Links
- Public license information: LMS

KJTR-LP (101.7 FM) is a radio station licensed to Rolla, Missouri, United States. The station is currently owned by Rolla Chinese Christian Association.
