= WXTH-LP =

Radio station in Richwood, West Virginia

- Richwood, West Virginia; United States
- Broadcast area: Richwood, West Virginia; Fenwick, West Virginia
- Frequency: 101.7 MHz
- Branding: Heavenly Radio

Programming
- Format: Religious

Ownership
- Owner: Riverside Baptist Church

History
- First air date: December 23, 2014
- Call sign meaning: "X (Christ) in The Highest"

Technical information
- Licensing authority: FCC
- Facility ID: 194124
- Class: L1
- ERP: 100 watts
- HAAT: −114.4 meters (−375 ft)
- Transmitter coordinates: 38°13′9.43″N 80°32′41.19″W

Links
- Public license information: LMS
- Website: wxthlpfm.org

WXTH-LP is a Religious formatted broadcast radio station licensed to Richwood, West Virginia, serving Richwood and Fenwick in West Virginia. WXTH-LP is owned and operated by Riverside Baptist Church.
