= CJSO-FM =

Radio station in Sorel-Tracy, Quebec

Coordinates: 46°02′33″N 73°07′00″W

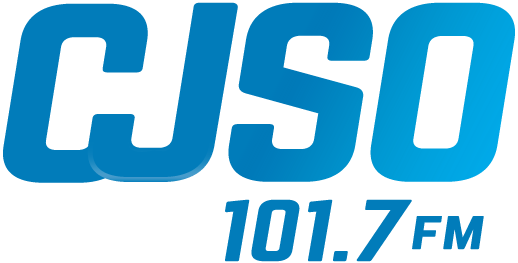

Sorel-Tracy, Quebec; Canada
- Frequency: 101.7 MHz
- Branding: CJSO 101,7 FM

Programming
- Format: Hot adult contemporary

Ownership
- Owner: Radiodiffusion Sorel-Tracy

History
- First air date: 1945
- Former frequencies: 1400 kHz, 1320 kHz

Technical information
- Class: A
- ERP: 3 kW
- HAAT: 67.5 metres (221 ft)

Links
- Webcast: Listen Live
- Website: cjso.ca

CJSO-FM is a French language hot adult contemporary radio station that operates at 101.7 FM in Sorel-Tracy, Quebec, Canada.

The station originally began as an AM station in 1945, initially at 1400 kHz, later moving to 1320, until it received CRTC approval to move to the FM band in 1987.

CJSO is owned by Radiodiffusion Sorel-Tracy.
