= WKYZ =

- Key Colony Beach, Florida; United States
- Broadcast area: Florida Keys area
- Frequency: 101.7 MHz
- Branding: Pirate Radio 101.7 FM and 96.7 FM for Key West

Programming
- Format: Adult album alternative
- Affiliations: Compass Media Networks

Ownership
- Owner: Keys Media Company, Inc.

History
- First air date: May 11, 1989
- Former call signs: WKKB (May 11, 1989-November 2, 1998)
- Former frequencies: 101.3 MHz (May 11, 1989-2008)
- Call sign meaning: West Keys

Technical information
- Licensing authority: FCC
- Facility ID: 73170
- Class: C1
- ERP: 100,000 watts
- HAAT: 138 meters (453 ft)
- Transmitter coordinates: 24°41′30.00″N 81°6′31.00″W
- Translator: 96.7 W244CT (Key West)

Links
- Public license information: Public file; LMS
- Webcast: Listen Live
- Website: pirateradiokeywest.com

WKYZ (101.7 FM) is a radio station broadcasting an adult album alternative format. Licensed to Key Colony Beach, Florida, United States, the station serves the Florida Keys area. The station is currently owned by Keys Media Company, Inc.

== History ==
logo under previous format

The station went on the air as WKKB on May 11, 1989. On November 2, 1998, the station changed its call sign to the current WKYZ. It has broadcast a classic rock format in the past. On May 1, 2009, WKYZ returned to the air (after two months of silence) with talk, simulcasting WFFG 1300 AM Marathon, Florida. On August 7, 2011, the simulcast with WFFG ended and the station adopted a AAA format with the branding "The New Pirate Radio 101.7 FM".
