= WRJF-LP =

WRJF-LP Street Level Radio
- Menomonie, Wisconsin; United States
- Frequency: 101.7 MHz
- Branding: "Street Level Radio.com WRJF-LP 101.7FM in Menomonie, WI"

Programming
- Format: Christian

Ownership
- Owner: Jesus Fellowship of Believers (Church) of Menomonie

Technical information
- Licensing authority: FCC
- Facility ID: 132039
- Class: L1
- ERP: 100 watts
- HAAT: 9.7 meters (32 ft)
- Transmitter coordinates: 44°52′33.00″N 91°55′20.00″W

Links
- Public license information: Street Level Radio Public file; LMS
- Website: WRJF-LP Online

WRJF-LP (101.7 FM, "Street Level Radio") is a radio station playing a Christian music format. Licensed to Menomonie, Wisconsin, United States, the station is currently owned by Believers City Church (Church) of Menomonie.
