= CKHQ-FM =

Coordinates: 45°28′58.08″N 74°06′11.88″W

- Kanehsatà:ke, Quebec; Canada
- Frequency: 101.7 MHz
- Branding: Kanehsatake United Voices Radio

Programming
- Format: First Nations community radio

Ownership
- Owner: James Nelson

History
- Founded: 1988
- First air date: 2013

Technical information
- ERP: 51 watts (Since May 11, 2021)
- HAAT: 55.9 metres (183 ft)

CKHQ-FM (Kanehsatake United Voices Radio) is a First Nations community radio station that operates at 101.7 FM in Kanesatake, Quebec, Canada.

Previously owned by the Kanehsatake Communications Society and serving the Mohawk community, the station received CRTC approval in 1988. Following the death of a former station manager in the early 2000s, the station went dark and was abandoned. The station's licence lapsed in 2004, after a one-year renewal period, but was never renewed.

Some time in 2013, the station resumed broadcasting, but as a pirate radio station on a part-time basis, without a current license. On December 9, 2013, the reserve, through licensee James Nelson "on behalf of a corporation to be incorporated", applied for a new licence, which would broadcast at 101.7 MHz with an average effective radiated power (ERP) of 11 watts (maximum ERP of 27 watts with an effective height of the antenna above average terrain of 27.2 metres). In addition, the licence stipulates that the station would provide 83 hours of programming a week—roughly 12 hours a day, with 68 hours featuring music programs and 15 hours spoken word. Languages featured are 95% English and 5% Mohawk; the new language provision differs from the original 1988 licence, which stipulated that 55% of programs must be in Mohawk, 40% in English, and 5% in French. The application was approved by the CRTC on June 17, 2014.

Funding for the new incarnation of CKHQ-FM will be provided through donations and fundraising events, as well as through its bingo radio program.

On May 11, 2021, Mohawk Multi Media received approval from the CRTC to acquire the assets of the low-power English- and Mohawk-language Indigenous radio station CKHQ-FM Kanesatake/Oka and to obtain a new broadcasting licence to continue the operation of the station. On June 14, 2021, Mohawk Multi Media received CRTC approval to operate an English and Kanien’ké:ha (Mohawk) language Indigenous (Type B Native) radio station in Kanesatake/Oka, Quebec, at 101.7 MHz (channel 269A1) with an effective radiated power (ERP) of 51 watts (omni-directional antenna with an effective height of the antenna above average terrain of 55.9 metres).
