= WRFH-LP =

- Hillsdale, Michigan; United States
- Frequency: 101.7 MHz
- Branding: Radio Free Hillsdale 101.7 FM

Programming
- Format: News/Talk

Ownership
- Owner: Hillsdale College

History
- Former call signs: WDLH-LP (2014)
- Call sign meaning: W Radio Free Hillsdale

Technical information
- Licensing authority: FCC
- Facility ID: 195820
- Class: LP1
- ERP: 28 watts
- HAAT: 58 metres (190 ft)
- Transmitter coordinates: 41°55′56.4″N 84°38′1.9″W

Links
- Public license information: LMS
- Webcast: WRFH podcasts
- Website: https://radiofreehillsdale.com/ www.hillsdale.edu/about/facilities/wrfh-radio-free-hillsdale-101-7-fm/

WRFH-LP (101.7 FM, "Radio Free Hillsdale 101.7 FM") is a radio station licensed to serve the community of Hillsdale, Michigan. The station is owned by Hillsdale College and airs a news/talk format.

The station was assigned the call sign WDLH-LP by the Federal Communications Commission on March 5, 2014. The station changed its call sign to WRFH-LP 15 days later.
