= KXUT-LP =

- Logan, Utah; United States
- Broadcast area: Metro Logan
- Frequency: 101.7 MHz
- Branding: Calf Country @ 101.7

Programming
- Format: Country

Ownership
- Owner: Wasatch Radio

History
- First air date: April 17, 2015
- Call sign meaning: Utah

Technical information
- Licensing authority: FCC
- Facility ID: 197228
- Class: L1
- ERP: 100 watts
- HAAT: −48.2 meters (−158 ft)
- Transmitter coordinates: 41°47′14.30″N 111°46′26.60″W

Links
- Public license information: LMS
- Webcast: Listen live
- Website: calfcountry.com

KXUT-LP is a Country formatted low-power broadcast radio station licensed to and serving Logan, Utah. KXUT-LP is owned and operated by Wasatch Radio.
