= WKYM =

- Monticello, Kentucky; United States
- Frequency: 101.7 MHz
- Branding: WKYM 101.7

Programming
- Format: Classic rock

Ownership
- Owner: Stephen W. Staples Jr.

History
- First air date: 1965

Technical information
- Licensing authority: FCC
- Facility ID: 63323
- Class: A
- ERP: 1,750 watts
- HAAT: 188 meters
- Transmitter coordinates: 36°48′36″N 84°50′49″W

Links
- Public license information: Public file; LMS
- Webcast: Listen Live
- Website: wkym.com

WKYM (101.7 FM) is a radio station broadcasting a classic rock format. Licensed to Monticello, Kentucky, United States. The station is currently owned by Stephen W. Staples Jr.

Former logo
