= WDFC-LP =

HD FM Radio station in Greensboro, North Carolina

- Greensboro, North Carolina; United States
- Broadcast area: Piedmont Triad
- Frequency: 101.7 MHz
- Branding: Christ Church Radio

Programming
- Language: English
- Format: Classical, Variety
- Affiliations: Fox 8 News, The Classical Network

Ownership
- Owner: Christ United Methodist Church; (CUMC Radio, LLC)
- Operator: CUMC Radio, LLC

History
- First air date: March 15, 2015
- Call sign meaning: We Are Disciples For Christ

Technical information
- Licensing authority: FCC
- Facility ID: 192244
- Class: FL
- ERP: 0.013 Kw
- HAAT: 84 meters
- Transmitter coordinates: 36°05′42.60″N 79°49′7.90″W

Links
- Public license information: LMS
- Webcast: www.christgreensboro.org/live
- Website: www.christgreensboro.org/radio

WDFC-FM 101.7 is a low power non-commercial educational radio station broadcasting from Greensboro, North Carolina. It is the only United Methodist station in the Western North Carolina Conference of the United Methodist Church and is designed to entertain, inform and educate by featuring a wide variety of music and other variety programs. Owned and operated by Christ United Methodist Church and with an all-volunteer staff, Christ Church Radio operates 24/7 with an unusual type format featuring classical music on Monday, Wednesday, Friday, Sunday and Jazz/Smooth Jazz on Tuesday and Thursday. Variety programs are featured on Saturday. The station operates as a hands-on educational school for training students interested in going into communications and broadcasting. "Memories in Melodies" begins at 8 p.m. on Tuesday and "Jazz with Gil" follows at 9 p.m. "Andee's Favorite Music" is a variety show featuring folk music and other types on Thursday evenings at 9 p.m. Fifties, Sixties and Seventies music is programmed on Saturday afternoons from noon to 5 p.m. with "Charting in the USA". "On the Beach with Charlie Brown" presents beach music from 5 to 8 p.m. Saturday evenings and a combination of swing and jazz on Saturday evenings with "Simply Timeless" beginning at 8 p.m. The station switches to 24/7 Christmas music in mid-November each year and continues through the 12 days of Christmas ending on January 5. The Christmas programming is unique and features much more than what is normally heard during the Christmas season on other outlets. "The Seven Weeks of Christmas" contains both sacred and secular songs and features many songs not heard on most stations. Mixed in with the classical music programming is sacred music by famous composers from all over the world. Support for Christ Church Radio comes from the Greensboro Symphony, Music for a Great Space, Bel Canto, Industries of the Blind as well as various business firms, nonprofit organizations and individuals. Contributions to WDFC Radio, a 501(c)(3), are tax deductible. WDFC-FM is a strong local supporter of the arts in Guilford County.

Special shows featured during the week include: "Animal Radio"; "Blind Talk Radio"; "The People's Pharmacy"; "With Heart & Voice"; "Sing for Joy"; "Cool Jazz Weekly"; "Simply Timeless"; "Music and the Spoken Word"; "Day 1"; "Live Broadcast of Christ Church 11 a.m. Sunday Service"; "Picture Perfect"; "Between the Keys"; "The Lost Chord"; "Memories in Melodies"; daily devotionals from "The Upper Room" bimonthly publication and others. WDFC intentionally strives to be "Radio That's Different" from other stations through multiple formats and features. Programming offers something for most everyone with the large variety of shows available.
