= KEKO (FM) =

Radio station in Hebbronville, Texas

- Hebbronville, Texas; United States
- Frequency: 101.7 FM
- Branding: Radio Luz

Programming
- Format: Spanish Christian Radio

Ownership
- Owner: La Nueva Cadena Radio Luz Incorporated

History
- First air date: 2001
- Last air date: 2026

Technical information
- Licensing authority: FCC
- Facility ID: 85837
- Class: A
- ERP: 3,000 watts
- HAAT: 100 meters (330 ft)
- Transmitter coordinates: 27°18′47″N 98°39′53″W

Links
- Public license information: Public file; LMS

KEKO (101.7 FM; "Radio Luz") was a Spanish language Christian formatted radio station licensed to Hebbronville, Texas, area. This station was a repeater of KLIT from Ranchito Las Lomas-Laredo, Texas.

== History ==
KEKO signed on in 2001. In 2004, lightning damage to its transmitter prompted the station to operate at 70 watts. In 2006 and again in 2011, KEKO applied to go silent due to financial difficulties resulting from the reduced power. Once the station got up and running, it lost its transmitter site, prompting a move to a new location.

La Nueva Cadena Radio Luz surrendered the KEKO license in November 2026.
