= KBKB-FM =

Radio station in Fort Madison, Iowa

- Fort Madison, Iowa; United States
- Broadcast area: Burlington–Keokuk
- Frequency: 101.7 MHz
- Branding: 101.7 The Bull

Programming
- Format: Country
- Affiliations: After Midnite with Cody Alan; CMT Radio Network; American Country Countdown

Ownership
- Owner: Titan Broadcasting, LLC (sale to Civic Media pending)
- Sister stations: KGRS

History
- First air date: June 1, 1973

Technical information
- Licensing authority: FCC
- Facility ID: 64564
- Class: C2
- ERP: 50,000 watts
- HAAT: 142 metres (466 feet)
- Transmitter coordinates: 40°43′25″N 91°13′49″W

Links
- Public license information: Public file; LMS
- Website: www.1017thebull.com

KBKB-FM (101.7 FM) is a commercial radio station licensed to Fort Madison, Iowa, United States, serving the Burlington and Keokuk areas. The station primarily broadcasts a country music format. KBKB-FM is licensed to Titan Broadcasting, LLC which is owned by John C. "LJ" Pritchard.

Titan Broadcasting LLC agreed to purchase the station from GAP West (owned by Skip Weller) in late 2007. The station was owned by Clear Channel prior to GAP West.

In October 2026, it was announced that Titan Broadcasting, along with two other radio broadcasting companies would sell their radio stations to Civic Media.

101.7 The Bull's air staff consists of mornings with Drew and Tory, middays with Big Mark Hempen, K.C. in the afternoon, Whitney Allen in the evenings and after midnight.

The transmitter and broadcast tower are located between Fort Madison and Burlington near Hwy 61. According to the Antenna Structure Registration database, the tower is 149 m (489 ft) tall, with the antenna mounted at 132 m (433 ft). The calculated Height Above Average Terrain is 142 m (466 ft).

Prior to adopting a country music format, KBKB was previously a soft rock station, beginning that format in the late 1970s. It was a radical change from its previous format of Easy Listening when it was under the call letters of KXGI. Under the soft rock format, KBKB promoted itself as a hip modern rocking "River Town" station that still had its roots firmly planted in the local Southeast Iowa river valley heritage, and often used a bumper jingle that was based on the blues song "Ol' Man River" with the line: That Ol' man river, he keeps on rolling, just keeps on rolling with K-B-K-B.

KBKB introduced the use of many promotional contests. In the 1976–77 time frame, it ran a contest known as KBKB HI/LO CASH where contestants were to call in when a particular song was played, be the specific number caller to call in, and successfully guess the dollar amount of the current HIGH/LOW Cash value. If the caller failed to guess correctly, the announcer would say if the amount was too low or too high. This would give future callers a better range of amounts to guess. The prize amounts were generally small (under $100), but would garner considerable attention and interest. When KBKB made its debut with its soft rock format, ABBA's "Fernando" and Gordon Lightfoot's "The Wreck of the Edmund Fitzgerald" were current hits that received a lot of airplay on the new radio station. In the mid-80s, under the guidance of Music Directors (Tim Brown, Russ Ullrich...) the format received an "update", playing current Top 40 music. In the late 80s, the station erected a new tower and boosted its signal to reach more listeners. In 1990, Music Director Russ Ullrich (Mike Russell on-air) was successful in applying for KBKB to become a Gavin reporting station elevating the station's standing in the industry. The Top 40 format continued until the early 1990s when it started adding more classic hits into its mix. This continued until another format change to Country in 2001.

Prior to being known as KBKB, the station went by the call sign KXGI. KXGI-FM simulcast the same offering that was broadcast on KXGI-AM. Rich Harlow, morning man and sports reporter, and Dick Specht, a news reporter, were very popular radio personalities on KXGI along with Al Andrews, the mid-day personality who did the show "sales mart" Rich, Al and Dick would continue on for a time with KBKB after the format change. Specht was best known for his daily birth announcements ("Little Bundles of Joy"). It was one of his signature features on KXGI that continued into the early days at KBKB. Harlow also continued sportscasting for KBKB until 2007. KXGI studios were located in the Marquette Building in downtown Fort Madison, Iowa. However, sometime after renaming to KBKB and the format change, the studios were relocated to a new dedicated single-story building just outside town on North Hwy 61 atop Burlington Hill.

KXGI and KBKB were originally affiliates of the MBS (Mutual Broadcasting System) network, a pioneer in radio in its day. KXGI was started after World War II by two former GIs; hence the name, KXGI.
