= KSKE-FM =

Coordinates: 39.738°N 106.800°W

- Eagle, Colorado; United States
- Broadcast area: Aspen, Colorado
- Frequency: 101.7 MHz
- Branding: Ski Country

Programming
- Format: Country
- Affiliations: Denver Broncos Radio Network

Ownership
- Owner: Patricia MacDonald Garber and Peter Benedetti; (AlwaysMountainTime, LLC)

History
- Call sign meaning: SKi Eagle

Technical information
- Licensing authority: FCC
- Facility ID: 44012
- Class: C1
- ERP: 12,000 watts
- HAAT: 667 meters (2,188 ft)
- Translators: K237BI (95.3 MHz, Breckenridge, etc.); K248AP (97.5 MHz, Silverthorne); K252BX (98.3 MHz, Glenwood Springs)

Links
- Public license information: Public file; LMS
- Webcast: Listen Live
- Website: kskeradio.com

KSKE-FM (101.7 MHz) is a radio station broadcasting a country music format. Licensed to Eagle, Colorado, United States, it serves the Roaring Fork Valley, the Eagle Valley, and Summit County. The station is currently owned by Patricia MacDonald Garber and Peter Benedetti, through licensee AlwaysMountainTime, LLC.

The Past: The Rocky Mountains' favorite Classic rock station, KTUN, was a personality-driven radio station, The Eagle's average listener is the educated baby boomer. Some artists featured on “The Eagle” include: The Beatles, Fleetwood Mac, Grateful Dead, CSNY, The Eagles, Tom Petty and Rolling Stones. KTUN sponsors several local events to support our local communities.

<These dates are incorrect.> KSKE-FM launched in 1984 (no) as KGMJ, a country-music formatted radio station transmitting at 101.5 MHz with 36.6 kW radiated power. Original owners, Gloria and George "Judge" Jones Sr. launched the station in the ground floor of a building owned by Eagle Telecommunications, Inc., in downtown Eagle, CO. Transmitter and antenna were then, as now, located at West Castle Peak in the New York Mountain range. To differentiate itself from other stations, the station featured many local artists and bands of the time. Personalities were live around the clock until late 1985, when expense cuts caused the owners to bring in a satellite delivered country music format, and then Judge Jones entered into a sweat-equity agreement with a group of former University of Alaska Fairbanks (UAF) students led by Donn Erisman.

Erisman's KSKE-FM- broadcast from Kremmling, CO beginning in late 1983 at 106.3 and 107.7 FM. The studios were located in the top floor of "The Ramona Theater" Kremmling's defunct movie theater, the structure of which still stands today. In 1983, GM Donn Erismann and a conglomerate of ex UAF broadcasting students took over day-to-day operations of KSKE from Judge Jones with the plan of 'sweat equity-ing" their way into ownership. Those broadcasters included Malcolm Atteberry, Kate Carlyle, Vince King, Michael Zokel, Rick Thompson, Dave Bergen "the engineer", Danny Manning, RJ Bishop, Kathy Beris, and JJ Valentine. The format was a blend of Adult Contemporary in the mornings, AC & top 40 Mid-day/afternoons and AOR rock and Heavy Metal overnight. These format changes were meant to be subtle and blended throughout the day. While you can't please all the people all the time, we tried to keep the advertising business community content, if not happy. This gave us enough income to keep us fed. There were times when none of the airstaff were paid, but the station remained on the air for four years until it was shut down in 1987. The Jones family sold the station in 1987 to an absentee owner out of San Diego. The Erisman group's equity went unacknowledged and unpaid by either Judge Jones or the new owner. The Erisman group disbanded and most left the area.

This article becomes confusing because both call letters and frequencies shift around both before and after these events for several parties.

KGMJ flipped formats and call letters to KEYQ in January 1987, originating an adult contemporary format mixed with smooth jazz selections.

On September 7, 2009 KTUN changed their format to country (moved from 104.7 FM Vail, CO (now KBTB)) and on September 15, 2009 changed their call letters to KSKE-FM
