= Cascapédia River =

Cascapedia River Rivière Cascapédia
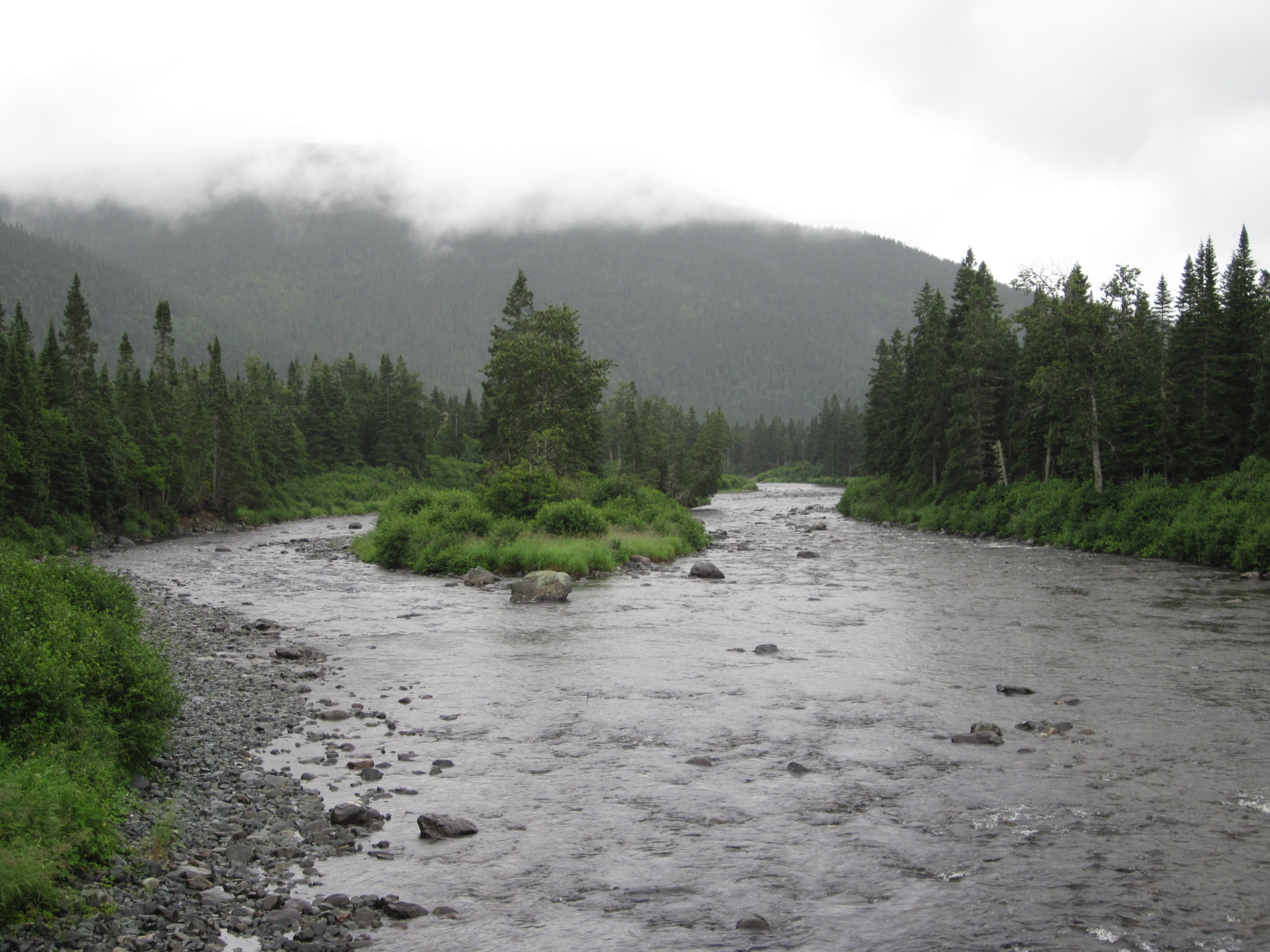
- Cascapédia River in the Gaspésie Park

Location
- Country: Canada
- Province: Quebec
- Region: Bas-Saint-Laurent, Gaspésie

Physical characteristics
- Source: Lake Cascapédia
  - location: Mont-Albert UNO
  - coordinates: 48°54′22″N 66°20′58″W
  - elevation: 490 m (1,610 ft)
- Mouth: Cascapedia Bay (Chaleur Bay)
  - location: Gesgapegiag
  - coordinates: 48°11′13″N 65°54′44″W
  - elevation: 0 m (0 ft)
- Length: 120 km (75 mi)
- Basin size: 3,172 km^{2} (1,225 sq mi)
- Discharge
  - average: 82 m^{3}/s (2,900 cu ft/s)

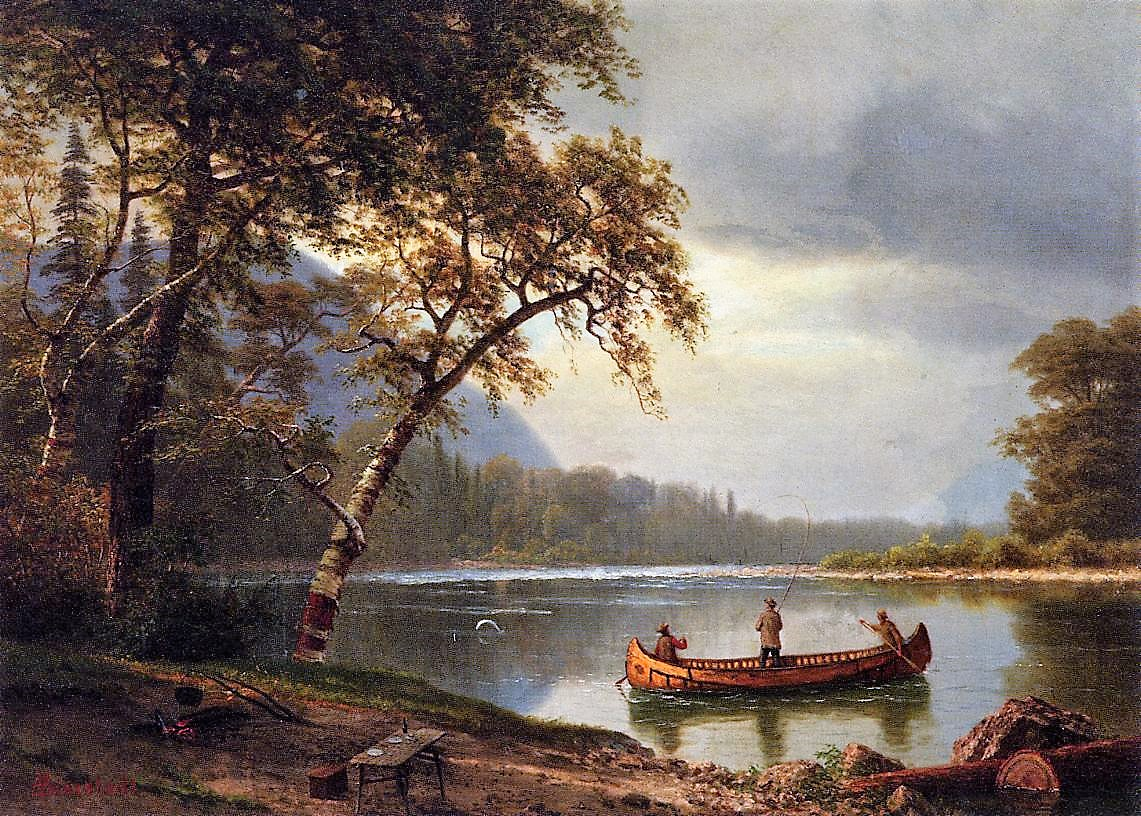
Salmon fishing on the Cascapédia River, by Albert Bierstadt, 2nd half 19th century.

The Cascapédia River is a river in the Gaspé Peninsula of Quebec, Canada, which has its source at Lake Cascapedia, fed by streams of the Chic-Choc Mountains, and empties into Cascapedia Bay (Baie de la Cascapédia), a small bay of Chaleur Bay. The river is about 120 kilometres (75 mi) long. At times, it is also called Grand Cascapédia River to differentiate it from the Little Cascapédia River which empties into the same bay just to the east.

The Cascapedia is known for its Atlantic salmon (salmo salar) fishing. With average catches of 20 pounds (9.1 kg) and a record catch of 54 pounds (24 kg), caught in 1886, the river has long been recognized as one of Quebec's richest salmon rivers. Already back in 1835, surveyor Joseph Hamel noted the abundance of fish, including trout, salmon, carp, and whitefish. Several Governors General of Canada, including The Marquess of Lansdowne and Lord Stanley, had summer homes along this river.

The river is accessible via Quebec Route 299 that follows the river's course for 69 kilometres (43 mi). Almost its entire course is protected in the Cascapedia River Wildlife Reserve (réserve faunique de la Rivière-Cascapédia), established in 1982. Its headwaters and Lake Cascapedia are within the Gaspésie National Park.

== Etymology ==
Its name comes from the Mi'kmaq word gesgapegiag, meaning "strong current" or "large river". It was first documented on a map by Jean-Baptiste-Louis Franquelin in 1686 as Kichkabeguiak, and appeared as Kaskabijack on a map of 1783. By 1863 Stanislas Drapeau used the current spelling.

== Geography ==
The Cascapédia River is entirely undammed and wild, and no municipality is using it for its wastewater. Because its source is the Chic Choc Mountains that are largely made up of soluble limestone, its waters are rich in carbonates and low in sulfates and chlorides, with a higher conductivity and pH level than typical water of the Canadian Shield. The lack of agriculture and industry keep the river free from pollution. Its water is rated of the highest quality.

The Cascapedia basin is also mostly undeveloped with less than 500 hectares (1,200 acres) under cultivation. Logging is more important: 8 percent of the basin area was harvested between 1988 and 1994.

== Tributaries ==
The significant tributaries of the Cascapédia River are (in upstream order):

- Ruisseau Blanc (White Brook)
- Ruisseau de la Truite (Trout Brook)
- Angers River
  - Ruisseau Grand Nord (Big North Brook)
  - Argument Creek
- “Rousseau Joshué” (Joshua’s Brook)
- Square Forks River
- Berry Brook
- Branche du Lac (Lake Branch)
  - Ruisseau de l'Échouement (Go Ashore Brook)
  - Ruisseau de Mineurs (Miners Brook)
  - Ruisseau de l'Inlet (Inlet Brook)
- Brandy Brook
- Indian Brook
- Ruisseau du Dix-Septième Mille (Seventeen Mile Brook)
- Ruisseau aux Saumons (Salmon Branch)
- Lake Branch

== See also ==
- List of rivers of Quebec
