= Gesgapegiag =

Gesgapegiag Gesgapegiaq (Mi'kmaq)
- First Nations reserve
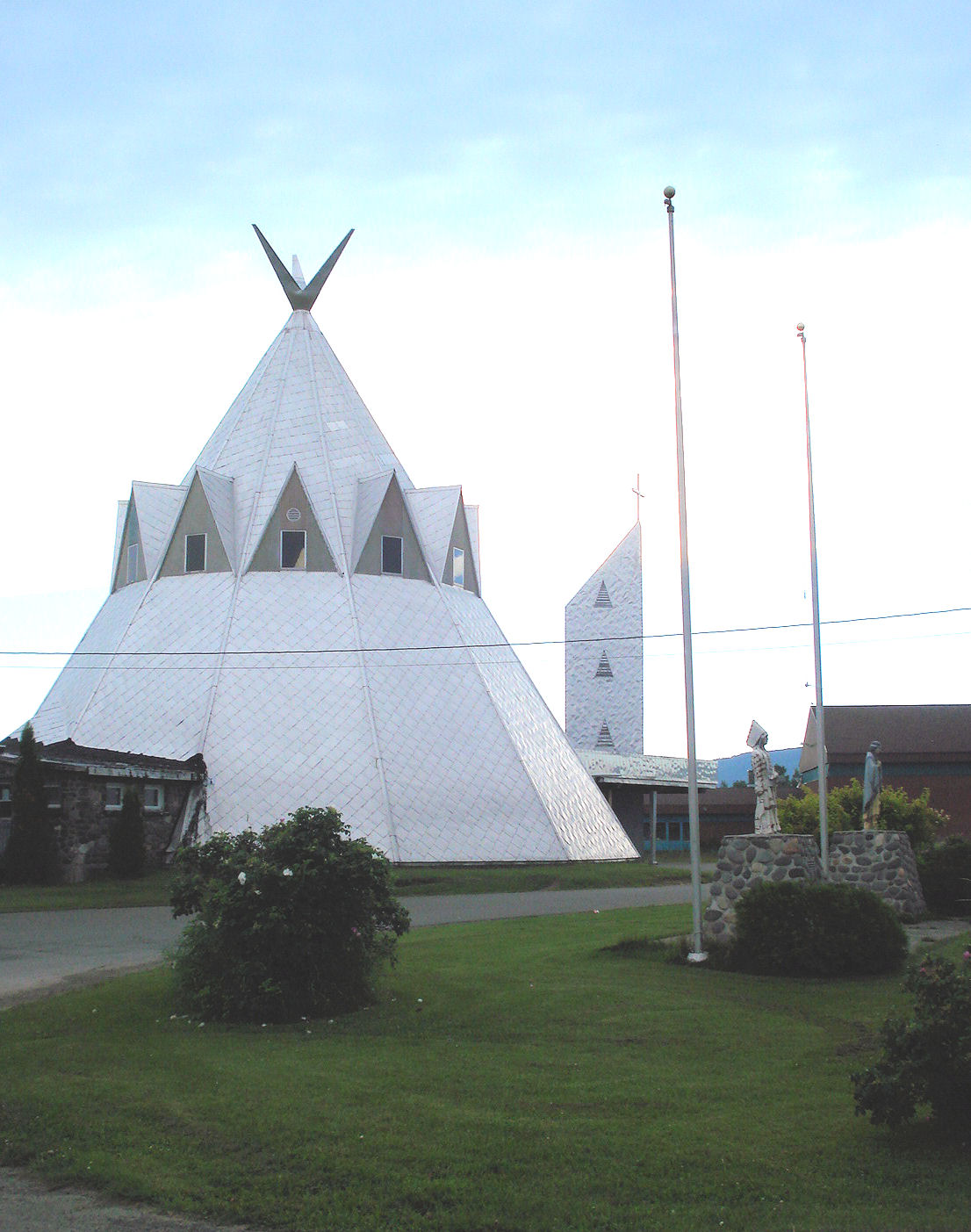
- Traditional tipee-shaped church

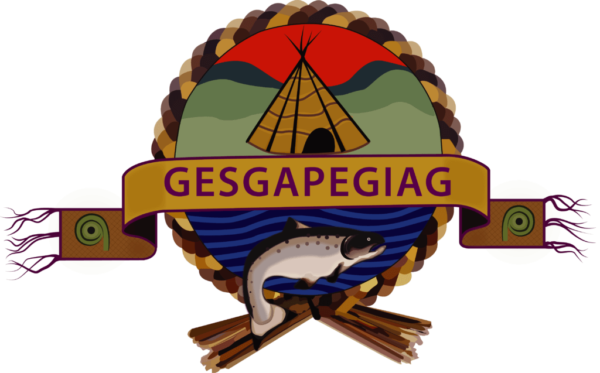

- Location of Gesgapegiag in Quebec
- Coordinates: 48°12′00″N 65°55′20″W
- Country: Canada
- Province: Quebec
- County: Gaspésie– Îles-de-la-Madeleine
- Founded: 1853

Government
  - Chief: Roderick Larocque
  - Councillors: 8

Area
  - Total: 2.2 km^{2} (0.85 sq mi)

Population (2021)
  - Total: 637
- Time zone: UTC-5 (EST)
- Postal code: G0C
- Area code: 418
- Highway: R-132
- Waterways: Cascapédia River
- Website: gesgapegiag.ca

Gesgapegiag (Mi'kmaq: Gesgapegiaq, lit. 'where the river widens') is one of three First Nations communities on the south shore of the Gaspé Peninsula, whose members are primarily of Mi'kmaq ancestry. Most reside on the federally recognized Indian reserve established by the legislature of Lower Canada in the 1850s for the exclusive use of Mi'kmaq in the region. Others live off-reserve across Canada and the eastern United States, maintaining close ties to the community.

All members, whether on- or off-reserve, participate in biennial elections to choose one chief and eight councillors under the Indian Act. The community maintains close alliances with other Mi'kmaq communities in Quebec’s Gaspé Peninsula and New Brunswick. Together, their elected chiefs work to advance ancestral claims to self-government and the traditional Mi’kmaq district of Gespe’gewa’gi (Kespékewáki), meaning “the last land.”

Gespe’gewa’gi is the Mi’kmaq Nation district extending from the Miramichi River to the tip of the Gaspé Peninsula, spanning the modern Quebec–New Brunswick border. The Gesgapegiag First Nation is an active advocate for Indigenous and treaty rights in Canada. Its economy and cultural practices continue to rely on natural resources such as Atlantic salmon, forestry, and freshwater systems. Representatives of Gesgapegiag and the wider Gespe’gewa’gi district continue discussions with the Government of Quebec regarding access to traditional lands.

== History ==
The Mi’kmaq are one of the most ancient Indigenous peoples of eastern North America, with archaeological evidence showing that their ancestors have lived in the Atlantic region for over 10,000 years. Their traditional territory, Mi’kma’ki, encompassed present-day Nova Scotia, Prince Edward Island, New Brunswick, parts of Newfoundland, and Quebec’s Gaspé Peninsula. The region’s rivers, forests, and coasts provided abundant resources that sustained their way of life.

Following European contact in the 16th and 17th centuries, the Mi’kmaq’s vast territory was gradually reduced through colonial expansion, settlement, and the establishment of reserves. Treaties signed with the British Crown in the 18th century recognized Mi’kmaq rights to land and resources, but these agreements were often ignored or reinterpreted by colonial authorities. Over time, Mi’kmaq communities were confined to small reserves, leading to significant disruption of their traditional ways of life.

In the late 18th century, Indigenous claims were made to hunting and fishing rights on the Cascapedia River, as well as to exclusive occupation of its banks. By at least 1784, Mi'kmaq families had begun to establish permanent settlements along the river, and their numbers grew steadily over time. A census taken in 1825 recorded 112 Mi'kmaq living on the Gesgapegiag Indian Reserve.

From an early period, these families also produced maple sugar on Horse Island, eventually establishing as many as fourteen camps dedicated to this work. The “juice of the maple” became an important source of income for the community.

The Gesgapegiag reserve was formally established by the legislature of Lower Canada in 1853. It was originally known as the Indians of Maria before the Department of Indian Affairs restored its traditional name, Gesgapegiag, in 1988. The name derives from the Mi’kmaq word Cascapédia, meaning “where the river widens,” a reference to its location along the Cascapédia River.

== Geography ==
Gesgapegiag is situated primarily on Route 132 around the south shore of the Gaspé Peninsula at the mouth of the Cascapédia River, where it widens into Chaleur Bay. Although its topography is mostly flat, the reserve is surrounded by the Appalachian Uplands . The first survey of the land was conducted in 1835 and the reserve's boundary more or less is shaped as an obtuse triangle.

== Demographics ==
As of September 2025, the band had a total of registered population of 1705 members, 721 lived on reserve and 984 lived off reserve.

Historical population
Year	Pop.	±%
1976	292	—
1981	317	+8.6%
1986	349	+10.1%
1991	327	−6.3%
1996	442	+35.2%
2001	488	+10.4%
2011	688	+41.0%
2016	653	−5.1%
2021	637	−2.5%

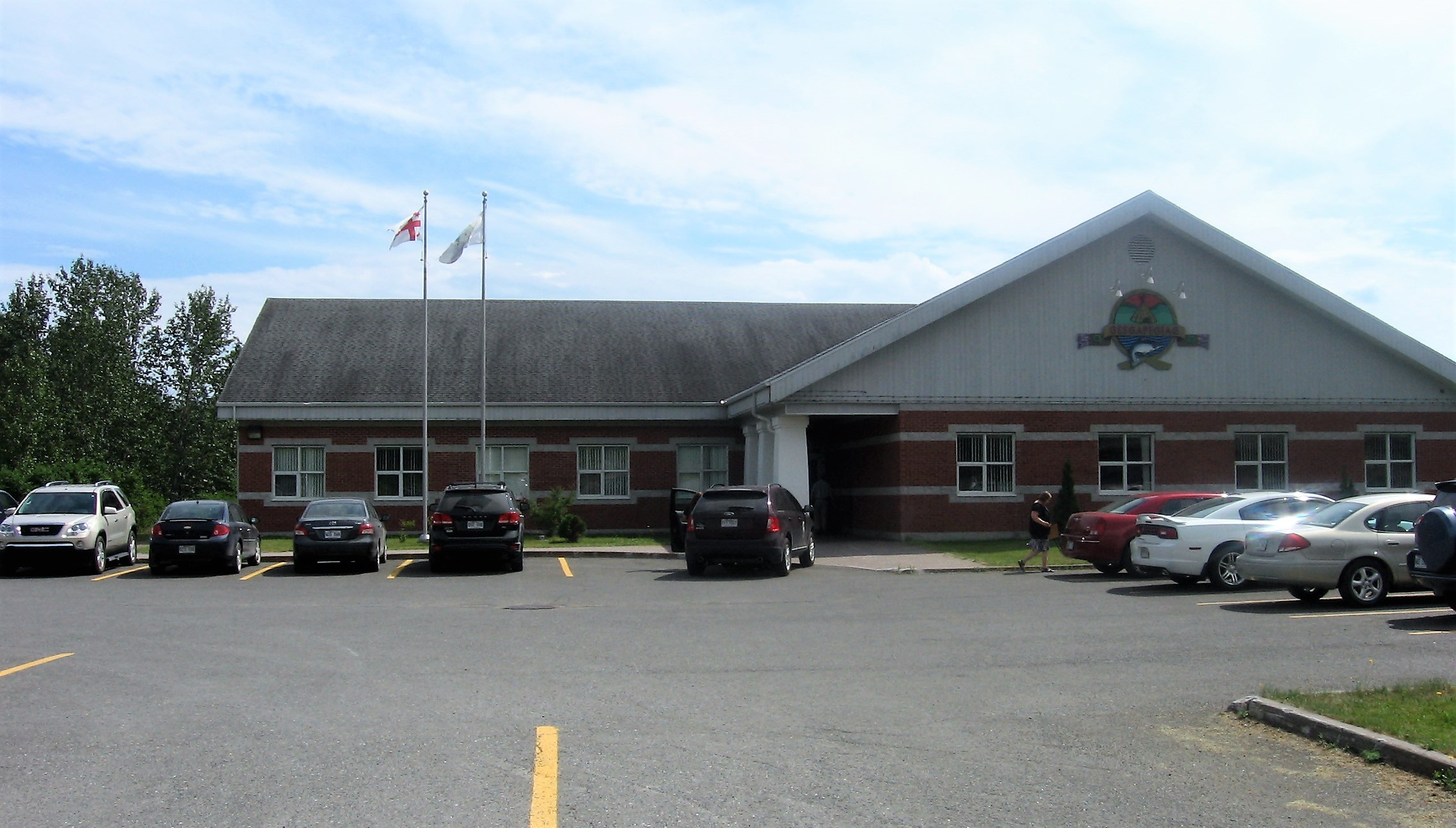
Band office

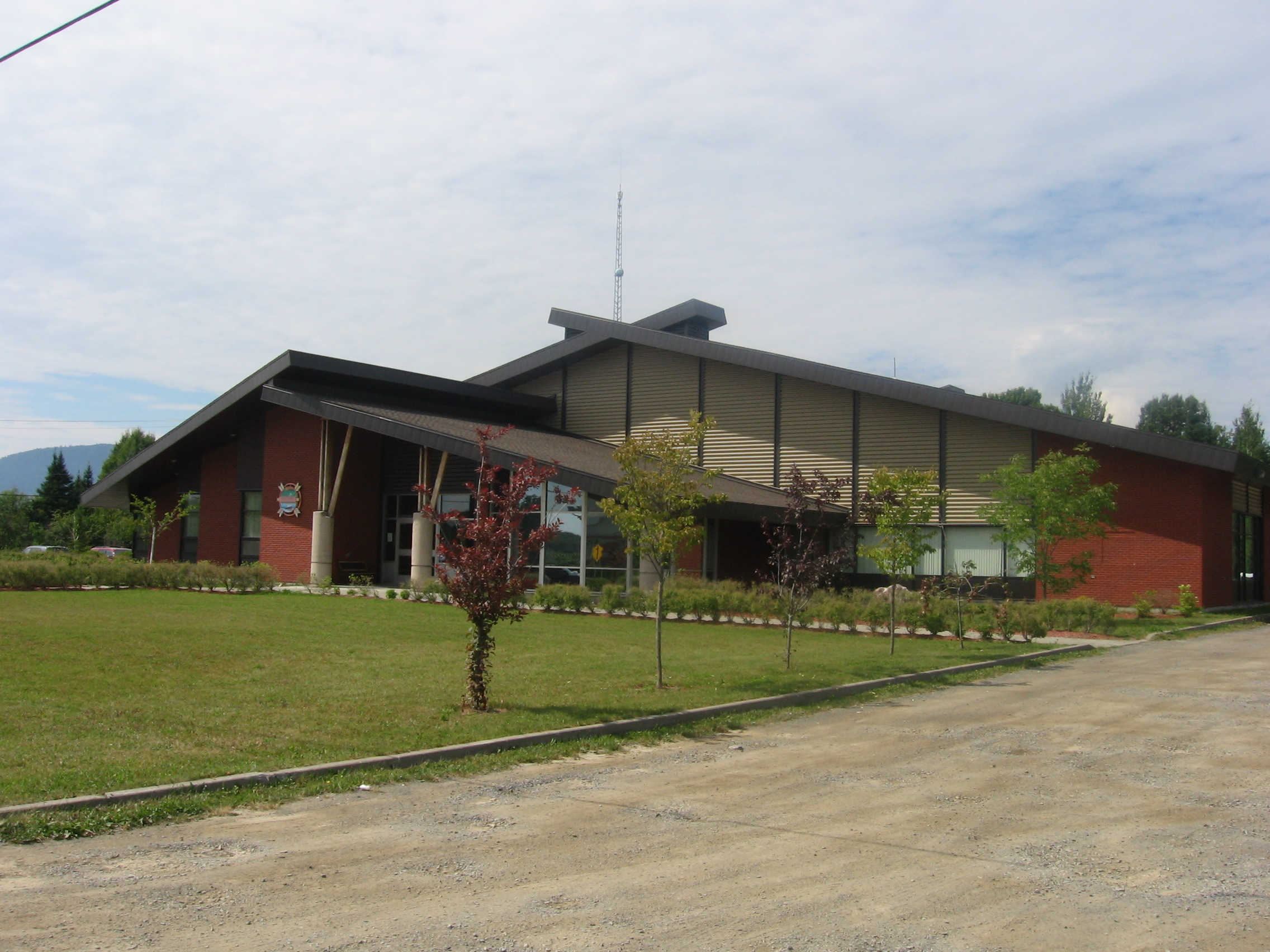
Galgoasiet

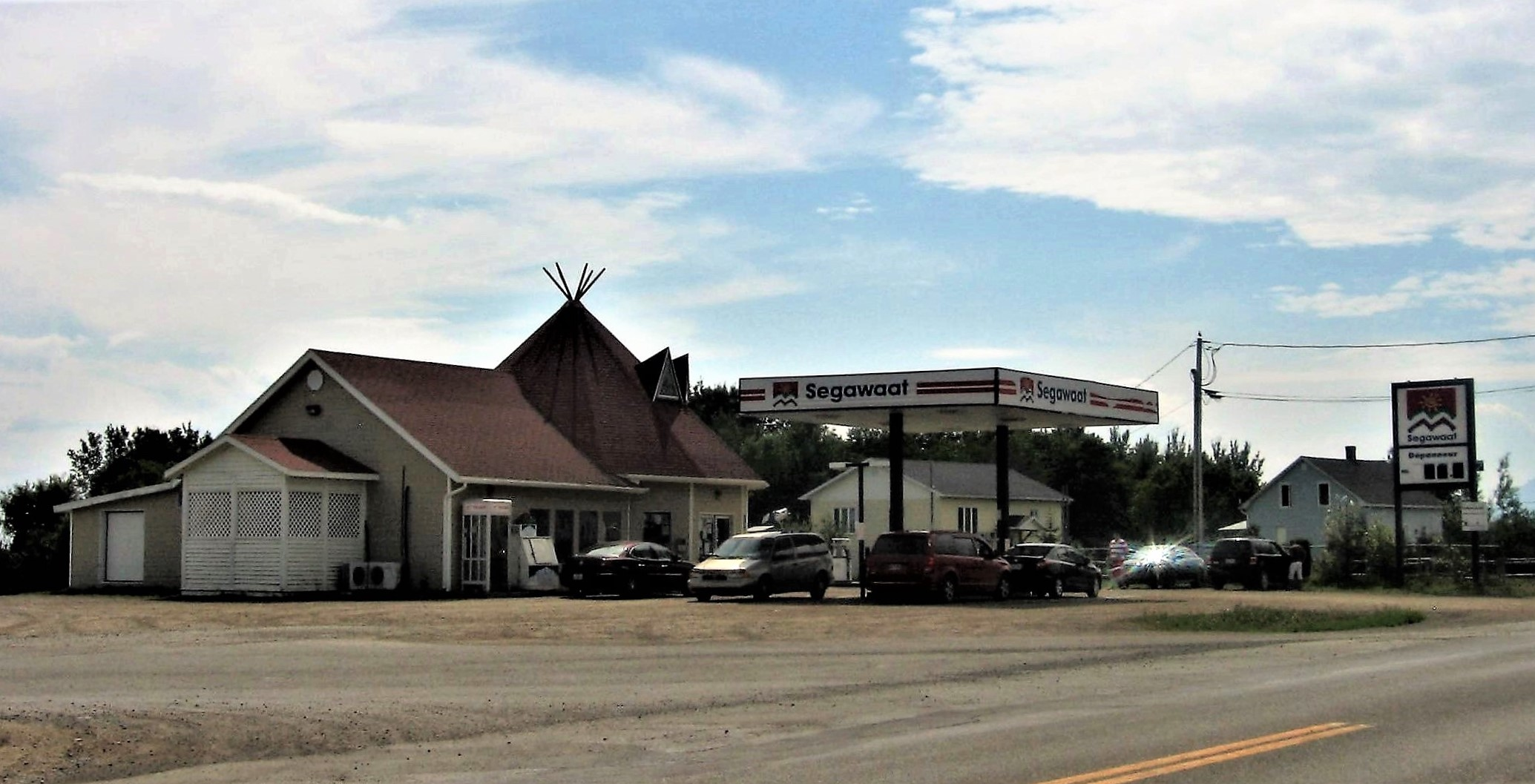
Gas station

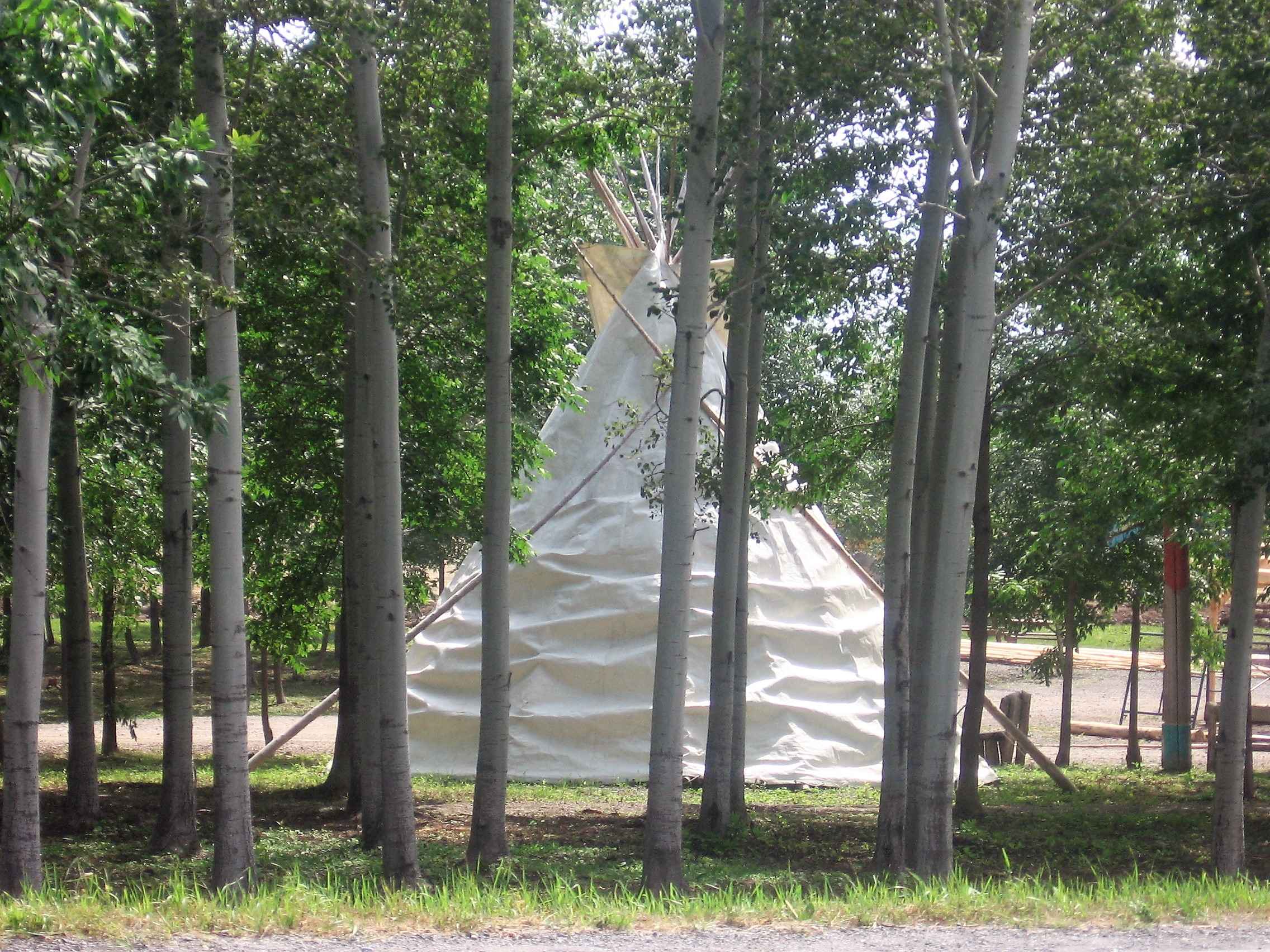
Old village

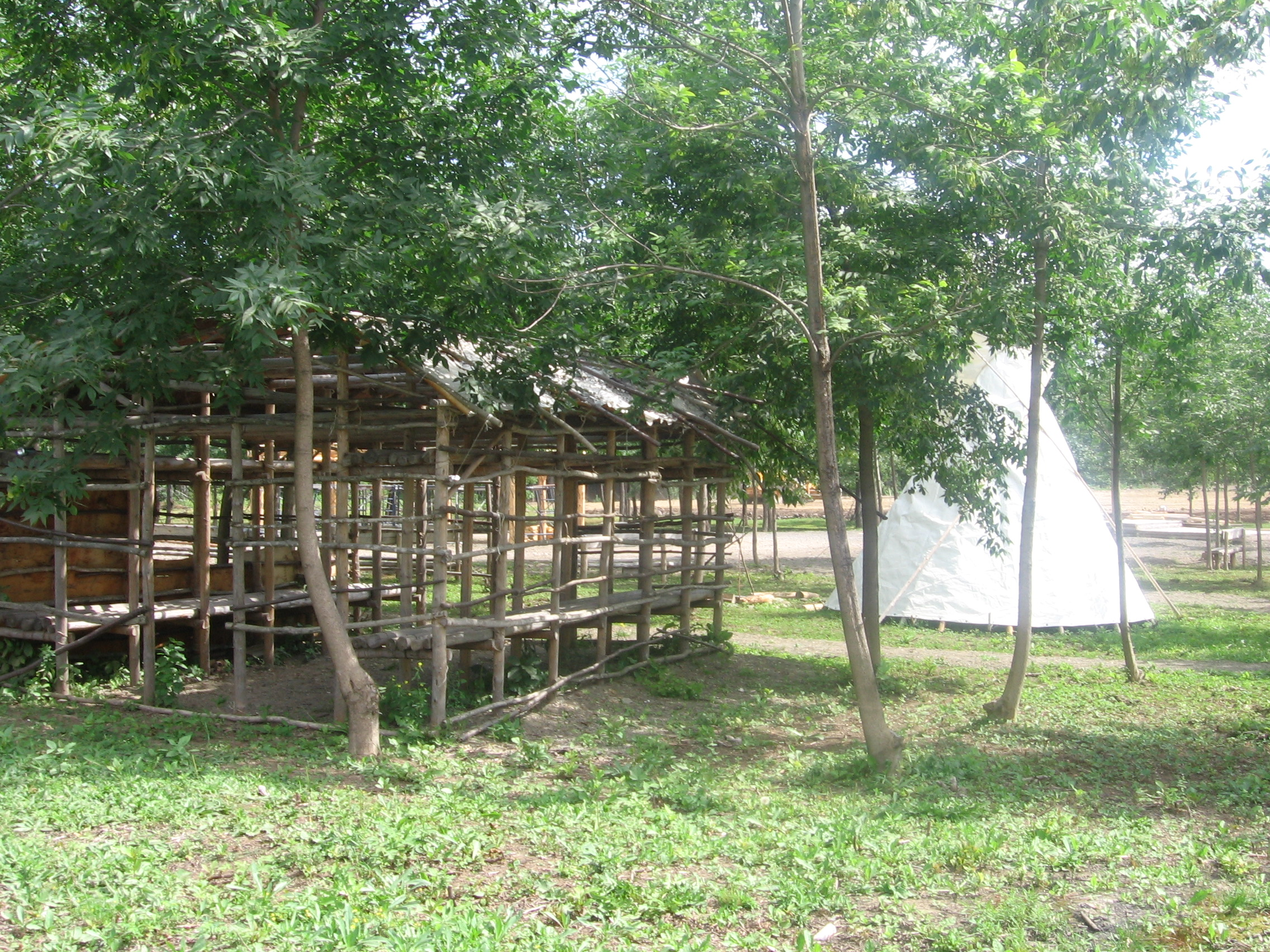
Old village
